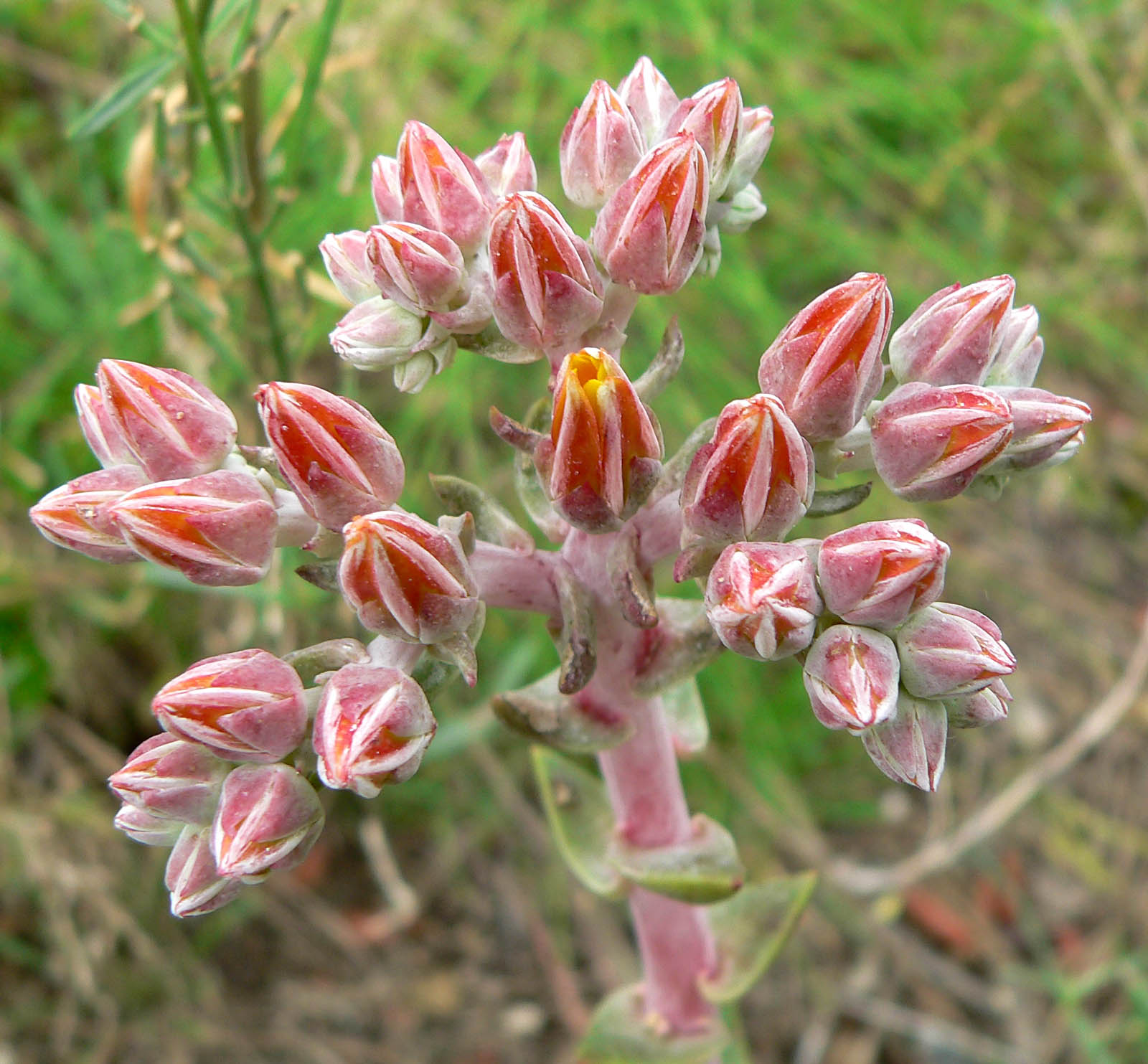

Conservation status
- Vulnerable (NatureServe)

Scientific classification
- Kingdom: Plantae
- Clade: Tracheophytes
- Clade: Angiosperms
- Clade: Eudicots
- Order: Saxifragales
- Family: Crassulaceae
- Genus: Dudleya
- Species: D. palmeri

Binomial name
- Dudleya palmeri (S.Wats.) Britt. & Rose

Synonyms
- Cotyledon palmeri S. Wats.; Echeveria palmeri (S. Wats) Nelson & Macbride, 1913

= Dudleya palmeri =

Species of succulent

Dudleya palmeri is a species of succulent plant in the family Crassulaceae known by the common name Palmer's liveforever. This Dudleya is endemic to California where it grows along the coast. It is characterized by orange to red over yellow or pink flowers. It is a polyploid species that closely resembles Dudleya lanceolata but has a coastal habit, and hybridizes with Dudleya caespitosa and Dudleya cymosa.

== Description ==
=== Vegetative morphology ===
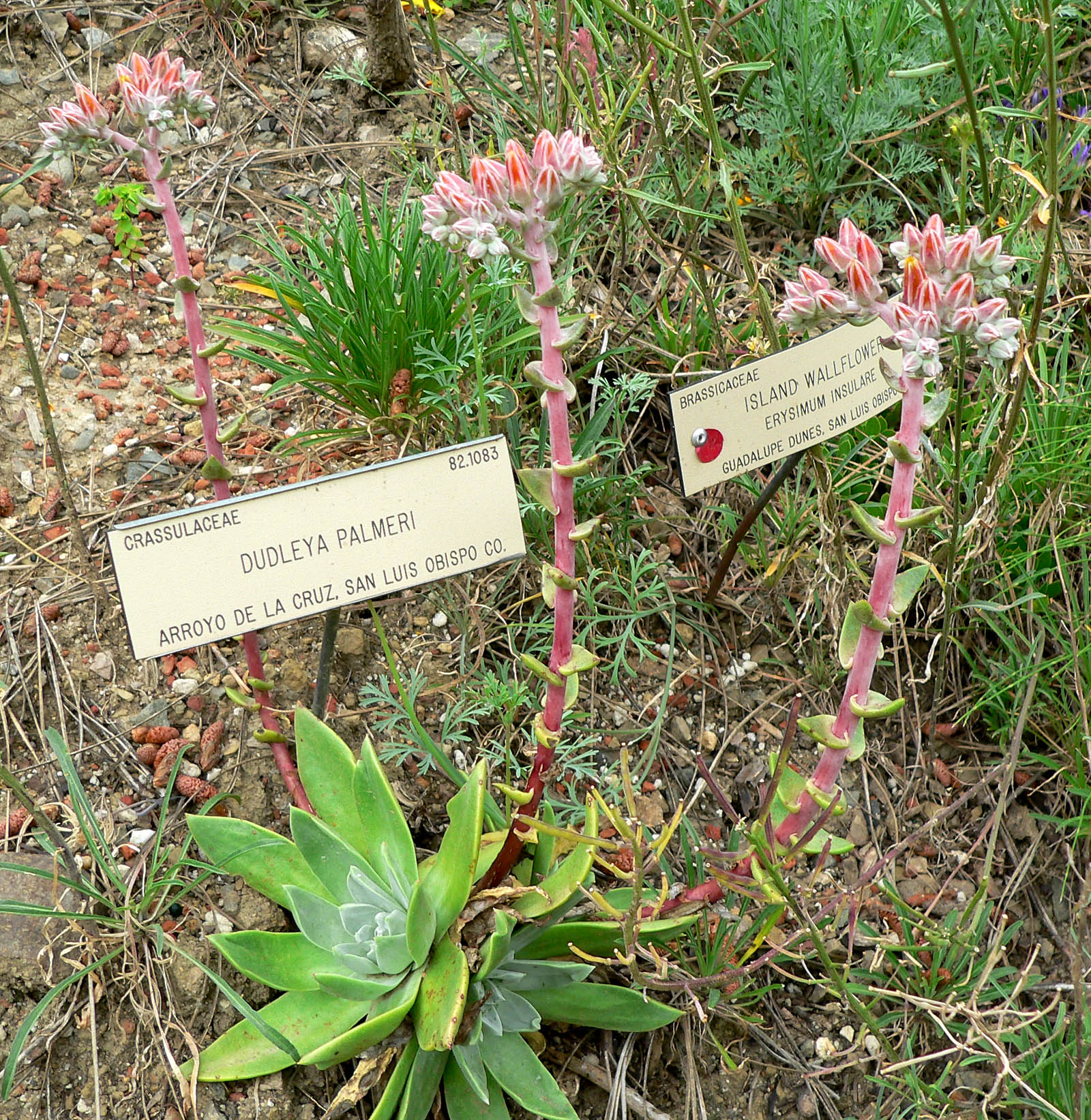
A plant in cultivation.

This species has a habit that may form solitary or caespitose plants of up to 8 rosettes, with each rosette 5 to 55 cm wide. The stem of older plants is typically shaded by desiccated leaves. The leaves are 5 to 20 cm long, and 1.5 to 5 cm wide, 3 to 8 mm thick, and shaped lance-oblong to lanceolate. The upper surface of the leaf is flat or transversely convex, and the leaves may or may not be covered in an epicuticular wax. When the leaves are removed from the plant, the remaining leaf bases will turn red with the wound. The tips are acute to acuminate, and the margins are often angled between the upper and lower leaf surfaces.

=== Reproductive morphology ===
The inflorescence is borne on a peduncle 15 to 85 cm tall, and 4 to 11 mm wide. It branches around 3 times, and then consequently may rebranch up to 2 times. The terminal branches are 5 to 8 cm long, and have 5 to 14 flowers. The flowers are suspended on erect pedicels 2 to 10 mm long. The flowers have sepals 3 to 5 mm long, shaped deltate to ovate, with an acute tip. The petals are 11 to 16 mm long, 3 to 5 mm wide, shaped elliptic, and colored a red over yellow, bright yellow marked with red, and orange, with the tips of the petals erect and acute.

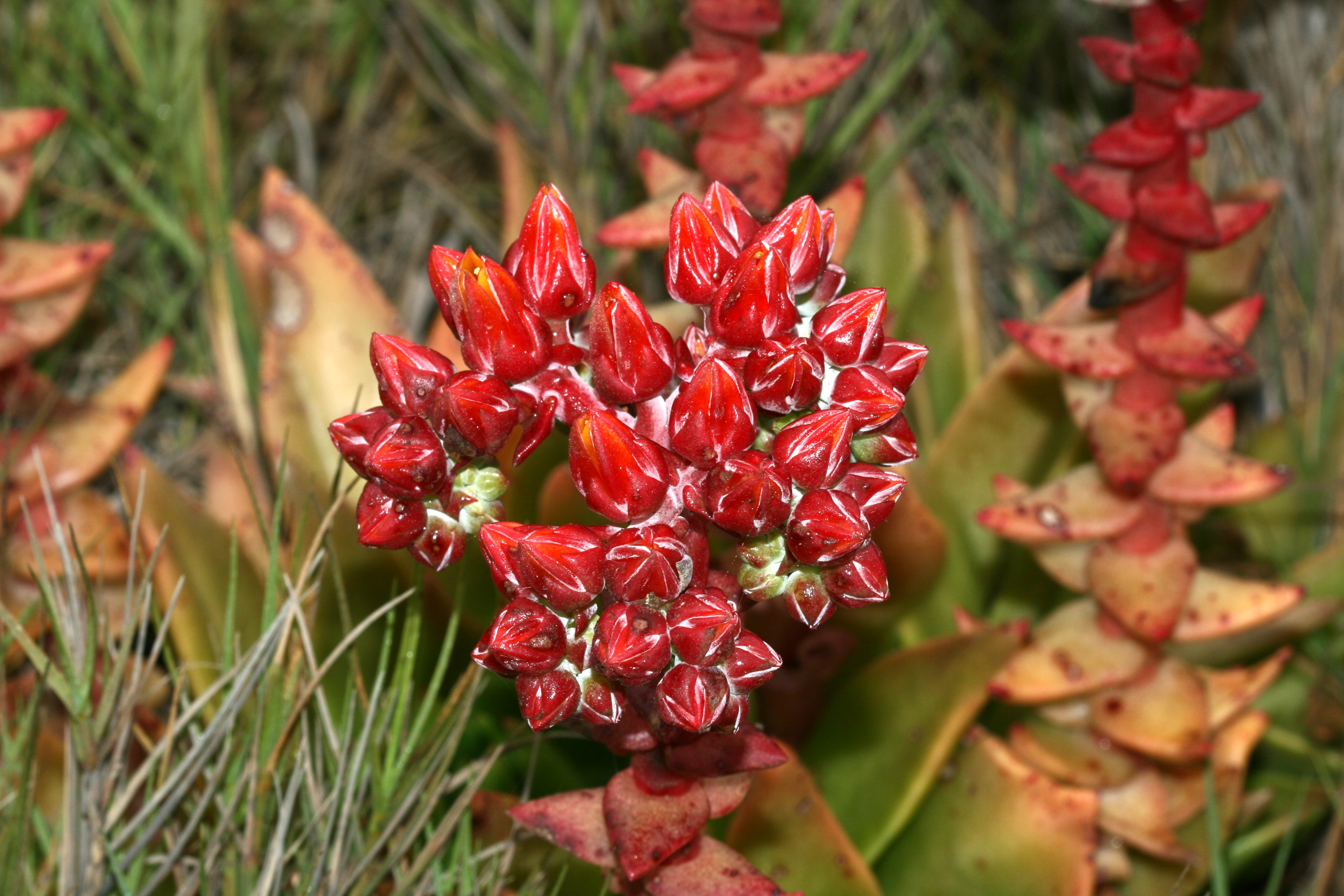
Another example of the inflorescence.

The chromosome number is varied, 2n = 136, 170, 238. Flowering is late spring, typically from May to July

== Taxonomy ==
=== Taxonomic history ===
The first collection of this plant was made in San Simeon Bay by a Dr. E Palmer in 1877, whom the specific epithet is named after, and described by Sereno Watson in 1879 as Cotyledon palmeri. The type specimen also regards the petal color as "pale lemon-yellow," rather than the currently accepted definition of D. palmeri encompassing red and orange petaled plants.

=== Classification ===
This plant is only more or less distinct from Dudleya lanceolata and Dudleya caespitosa. Some botanists regard the Dudleya caespitosa plants in Monterey County with red-petaled flowers to be closer to this species. It is within a species complex that includes Dudleya farinosa, Dudleya caespitosa, Dudleya greenei, and Dudleya candelabrum.

== Distribution and habitat ==
This species occurs from the Santa Lucia Mountains in Monterey County along the coast south to the Santa Monica Mountains in Los Angeles County. It is found on the rocky slopes and cliffs near the coast, from a height of 0 to 100 meters.
