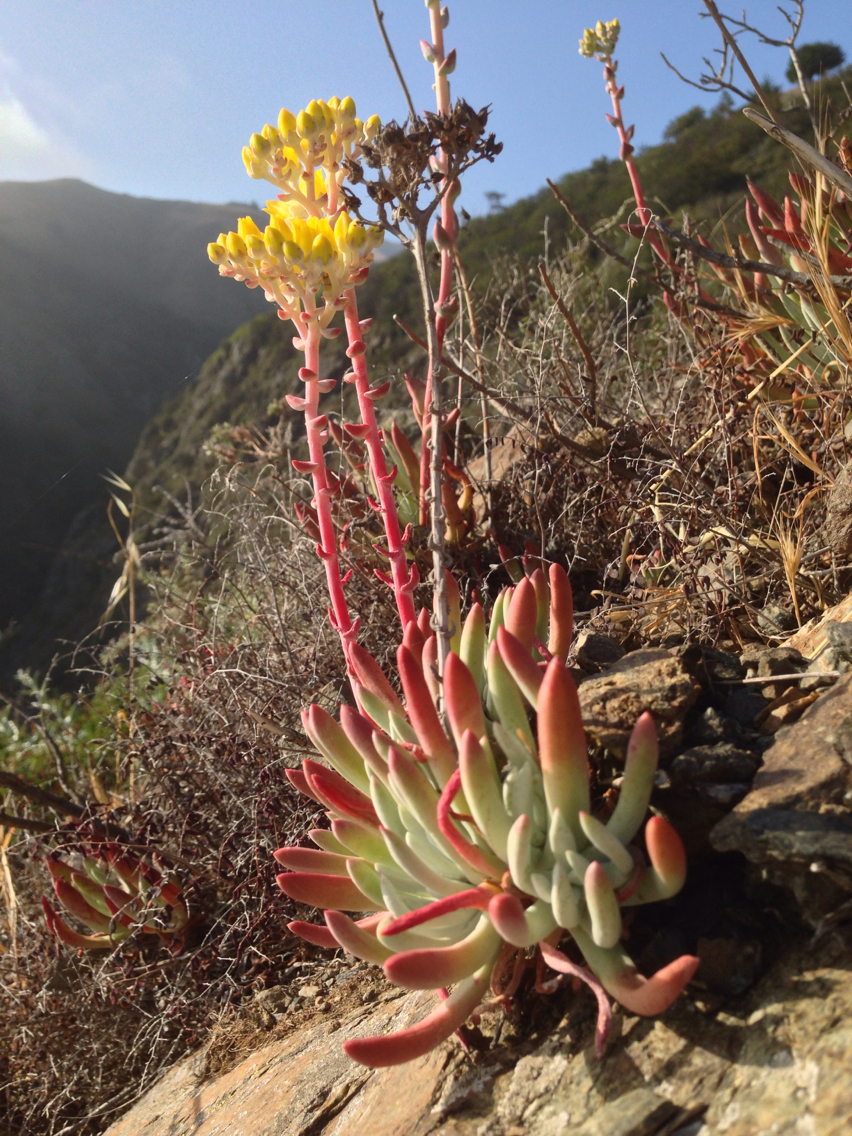

Conservation status
- Vulnerable (NatureServe)

Scientific classification
- Kingdom: Plantae
- Clade: Embryophytes
- Clade: Tracheophytes
- Clade: Angiosperms
- Clade: Eudicots
- Order: Saxifragales
- Family: Crassulaceae
- Genus: Dudleya
- Species: D. caespitosa

Binomial name
- Dudleya caespitosa (Haw.) Britt. & Rose
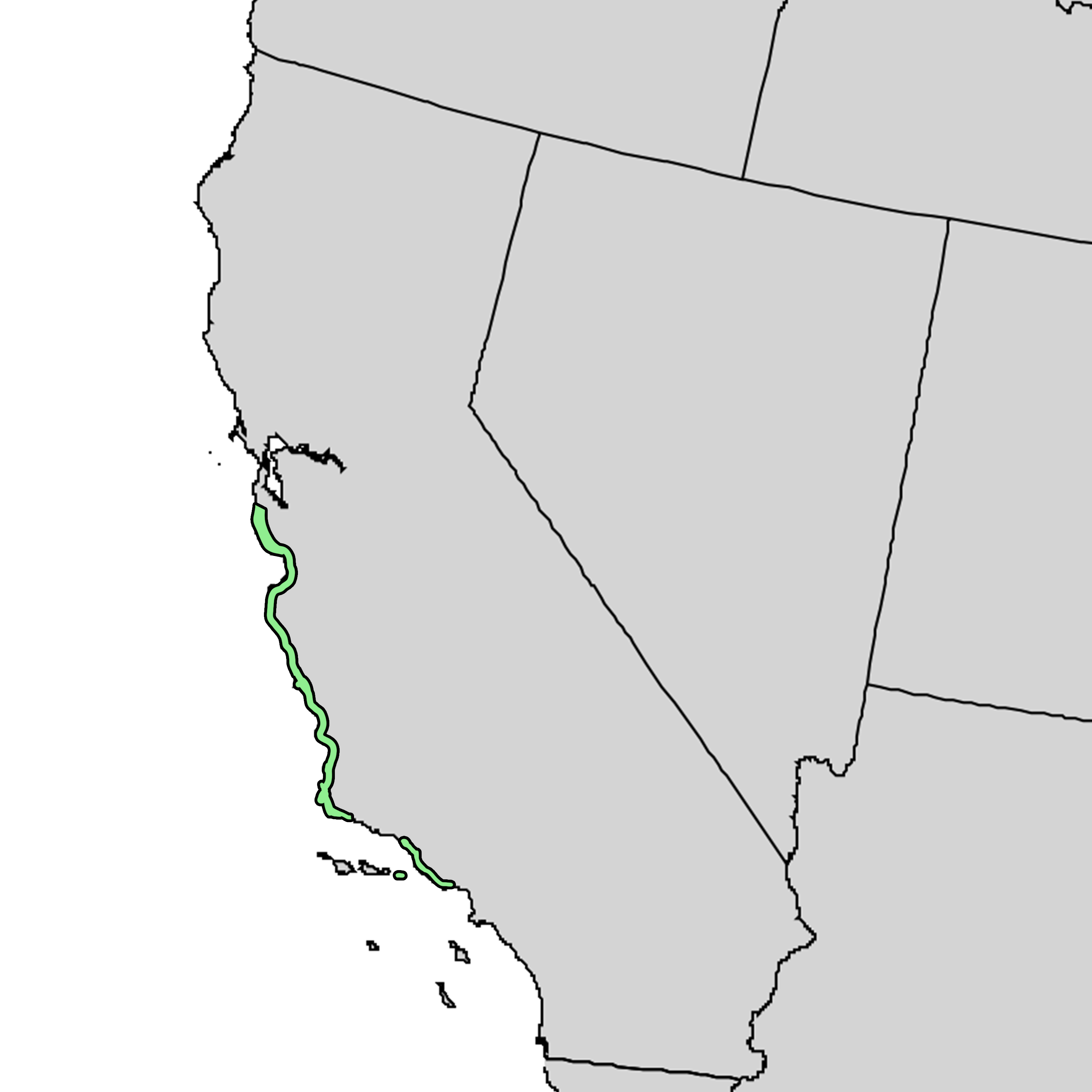
- Natural range of Dudleya caespitosa

Synonyms
- Synonymy: Cotyledon caespitosa Haw.; Cotyledon helleri (Rose) Fedde; Cotyledon linguiformis W.T.Aiton; Cotyledon reflexa Willd.; Dudleya cotyledon (Jacq.) Britton & Rose; Dudleya helleri Rose; Echeveria caespitosa (Haw.) DC.; Echeveria californica Baker; Echeveria cotyledon (Jacq.) A.Nelson & J.F.Macbr.; Echeveria helleri (Rose) A.Berger; Sedum cotyledon Jacq.

= Dudleya caespitosa =

Species of coastal succulent plant from North America

Dudleya caespitosa is a succulent plant known by several common names, including sea lettuce, sand lettuce, and coast dudleya. It is endemic to California, where it grows along the coastline in the southern half of the state. Taxonomically, this species is a highly variable complex of polymorphic and polyploid plants, closely related to numerous neighboring species such as Dudleya farinosa, Dudleya greenei and Dudleya palmeri. It is delimited from neighboring species on an arbitrary basis of distribution and chromosome number, and may not be immediately separable from the other species it approaches.

== Description ==
=== Vegetative morphology ===
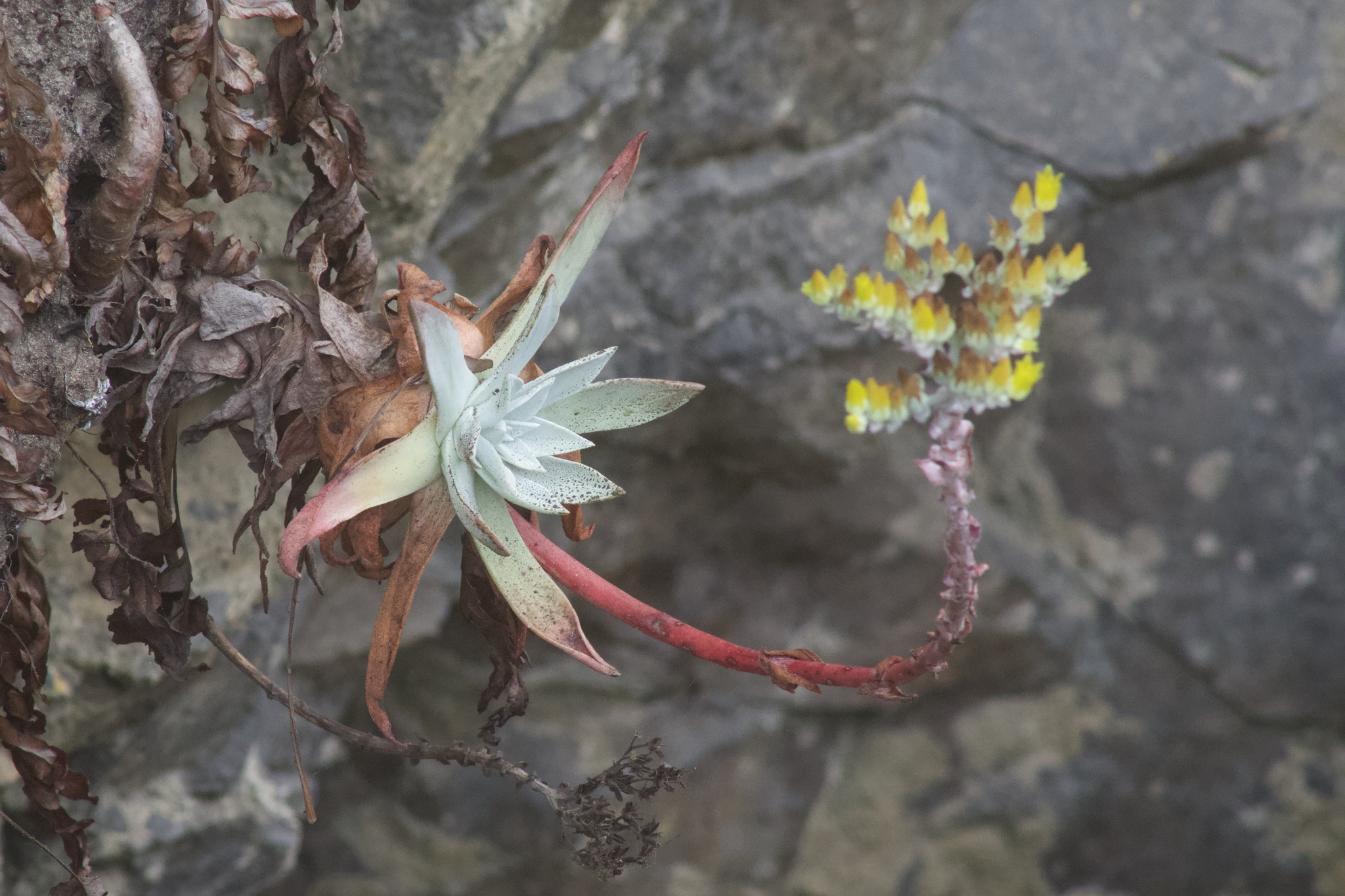
A solitary rosette growing along the coast near Big Sur.

This plant may grow in solitary rosettes, but most often forms caespitose clumps, which may contain up to 150+ rosettes. The clumps are generally not dense. Each rosette may be anywhere from 8 to 32 cm wide, containing 15 to 30 leaves. The caudex is 1.5 to 4 cm wide, and on older plants is often exposed between dry leaves. The stem is not swollen at the base, unlike D. candelabrum. It has a longer stem compared to D. farinosa due to greater space between the internodes. The leaf shape is extremely variable, although often lance-oblong, or oblong to oblanceolate, with generally acute to sub-acuminate leaf tips. On the edge of the leaf (the margin), there is generally not an angle between the upper and lower leaf surfaces. The leaf dimensions are generally around 5 to 20 cm long, 1 to 2 cm wide, and 3 to 8 cm thick, with the base of the leaf 0.5 to 4 cm wide.

=== Reproductive morphology ===
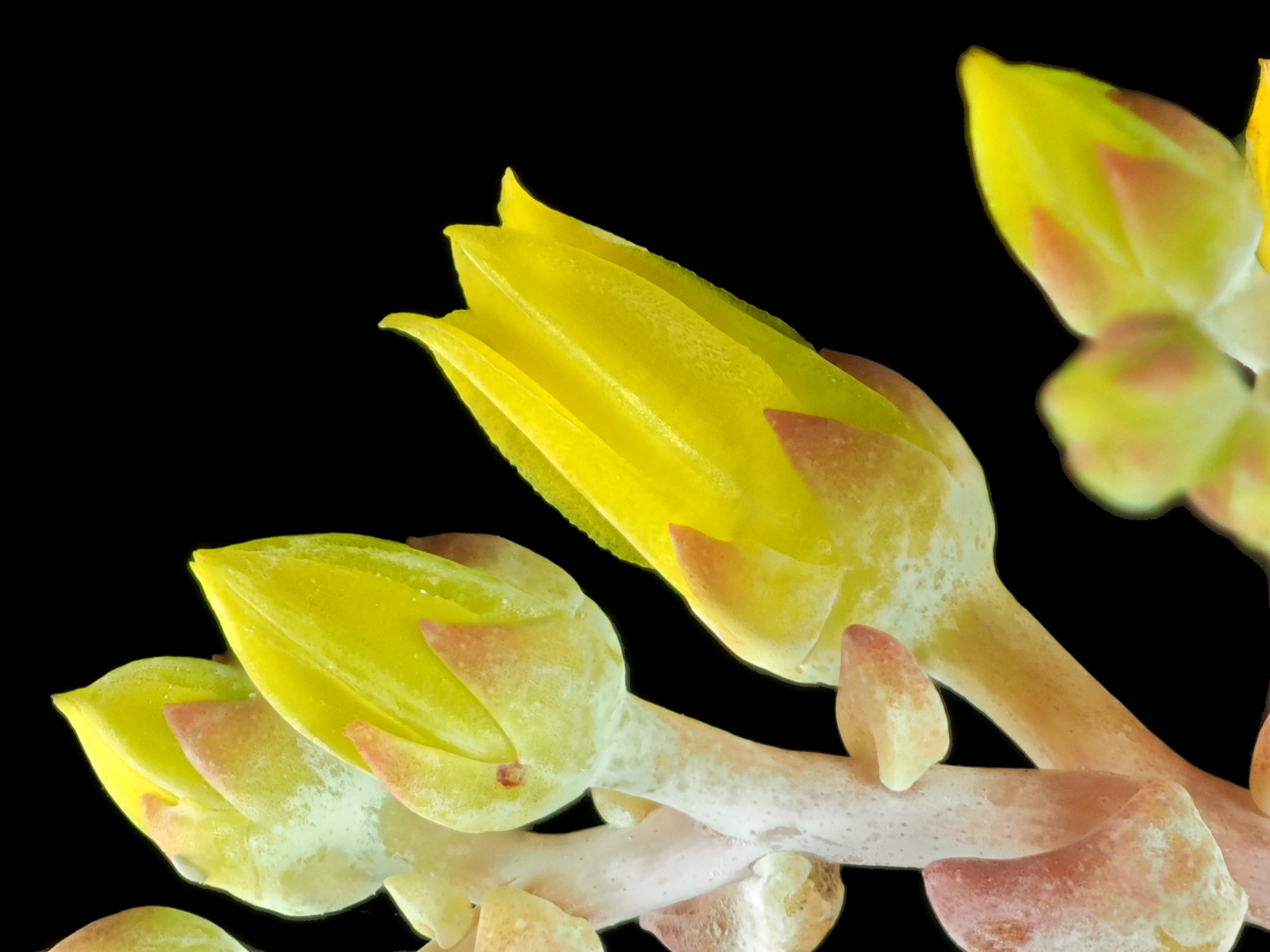
Detail of the flowers.

The peduncle is generally 10 to 60 cm tall, and 3.5 to 10 mm wide. There are typically 3 to 5 first degree branches on the inflorescence, which may stay simple or rebranch up to two times. The branches do not twist, and the flowers are on the topside. Each terminal branch is 3 to 15 cm long, and contains 4 to 15 flowers. There are 12 to 25 bracts, spreading to ascending, and shaped triangular ovate to lanceolate. The pedicels are 1 to 6 mm long, erect, and not bent in fruit. The sepals are 2 to 5 mm long, and shaped deltate-ovate, with an acute tip. The petals are 8 to 16 mm long, 3 to 5 mm wide, shaped elliptic, and are connate (fused to form a tubular corolla, as seen in the subgenus Dudleya) 1.5 to 2.5 mm. The petals have an acute apex with erect tips, and are generally colored bright yellow to orange yellow or red.

== Taxonomy ==
=== Taxonomic history ===
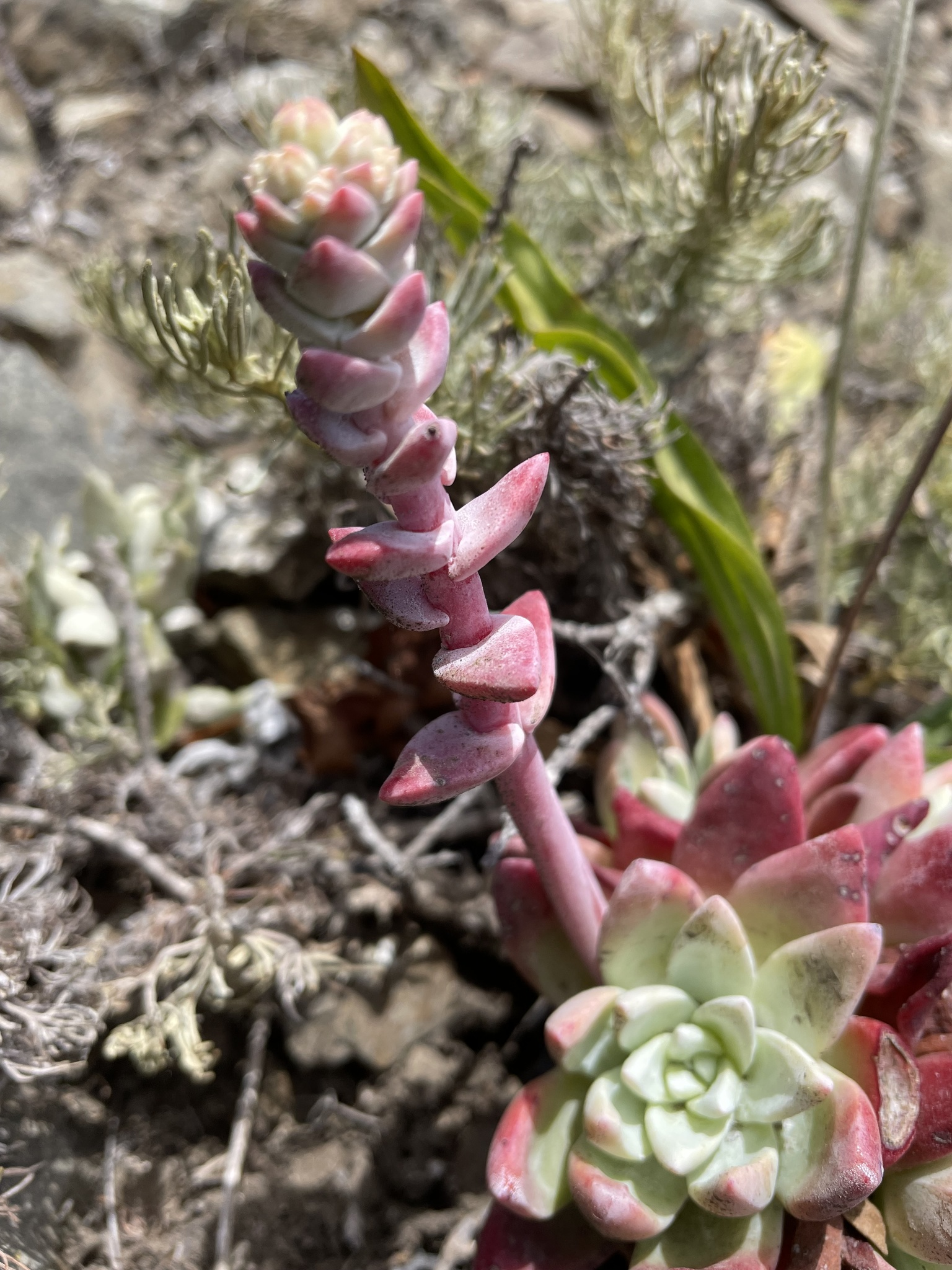
"A very distinct-looking kind, but not one that is handsome" – John Lindley

The plant was first described in 1803 by Adrian Hardy Haworth as Cotyledon caespitosa (the basionym). The original text erroneously cited it as from the Cape of Good Hope. The same species would later be described again as Sedum cotyledon by Joseph Franz von Jacquin and as Cotyledon linguiformis by Brown, both in 1811. In 1849, Lindley described the plant as Echeveria laxa, noting it as a very distinct looking plant, "but not one that is handsome." The plant was described in its current form by Nathaniel Lord Britton and Joseph Nelson Rose in their revision of North American Crassulaceae, which created the genus Dudleya.

=== Species complex ===
Dudleya caespitosa is regarded as a member of a highly developed polyploid complex involving numerous neighboring taxa, including Dudleya farinosa, Dudleya greenei, Dudleya palmeri, Dudleya lanceolata, Dudleya cymosa and Dudleya candelabrum. Reid Moran and Charles H. Uhl arbitrarily separated this species on the basis of ploidy and distribution. Dudleya greenei is an insular segregate of Dudleya caespitosa, whilst Dudleya palmeri is on the fringe of the complex with wide leaves and red to orange petals.

== Distribution and habitat ==
This plant is common and is found along the coast of California. Because the delimitation of the plant is based on arbitrary characteristics, the exact biogeographical distribution is difficult to pin down. The 2012 Jepson Treatment places the northern limit on the southern North Coast of the California Floristic Province. Plants identified with Dudleya caespitosa are found in the north from Point Reyes south to Malibu.

== Ecology ==
On the central coast of California near Santa Maria, numerous oil refineries exist, pumping phytotoxic sulfur dioxide. While plants like Salvia mellifera (black sage) were affected, Dudleya caespitosa proved to be somewhat tolerant of the emissions. This is likely due to the fact that Dudleya caespitosa uses CAM photosynthesis, which means their stomata open in the evening hours. Combined with the effect of southeast winds at night that blow away the emissions, the Dudleya avoid the phytotoxic emissions through this combination of meteorological conditions and CAM photosynthesis.
