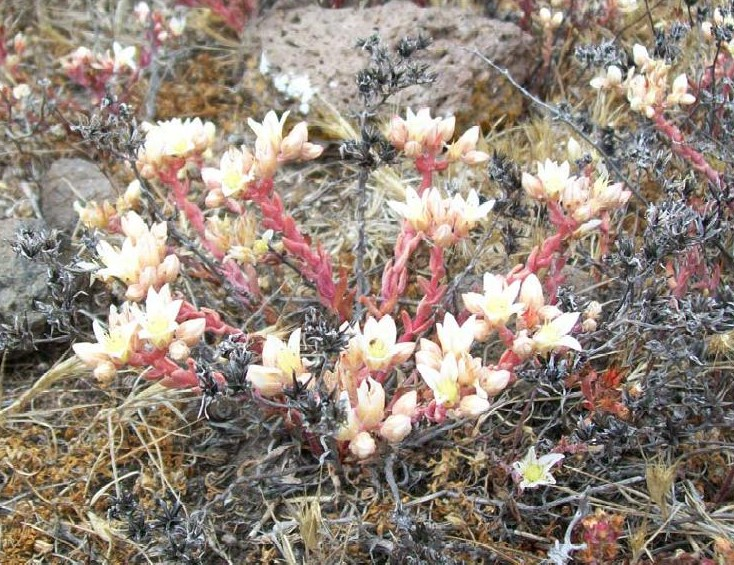

Conservation status
- Threatened (ESA)

Scientific classification
- Kingdom: Plantae
- Clade: Tracheophytes
- Clade: Angiosperms
- Clade: Eudicots
- Order: Saxifragales
- Family: Crassulaceae
- Genus: Dudleya
- Species: D. nesiotica

Binomial name
- Dudleya nesiotica Moran
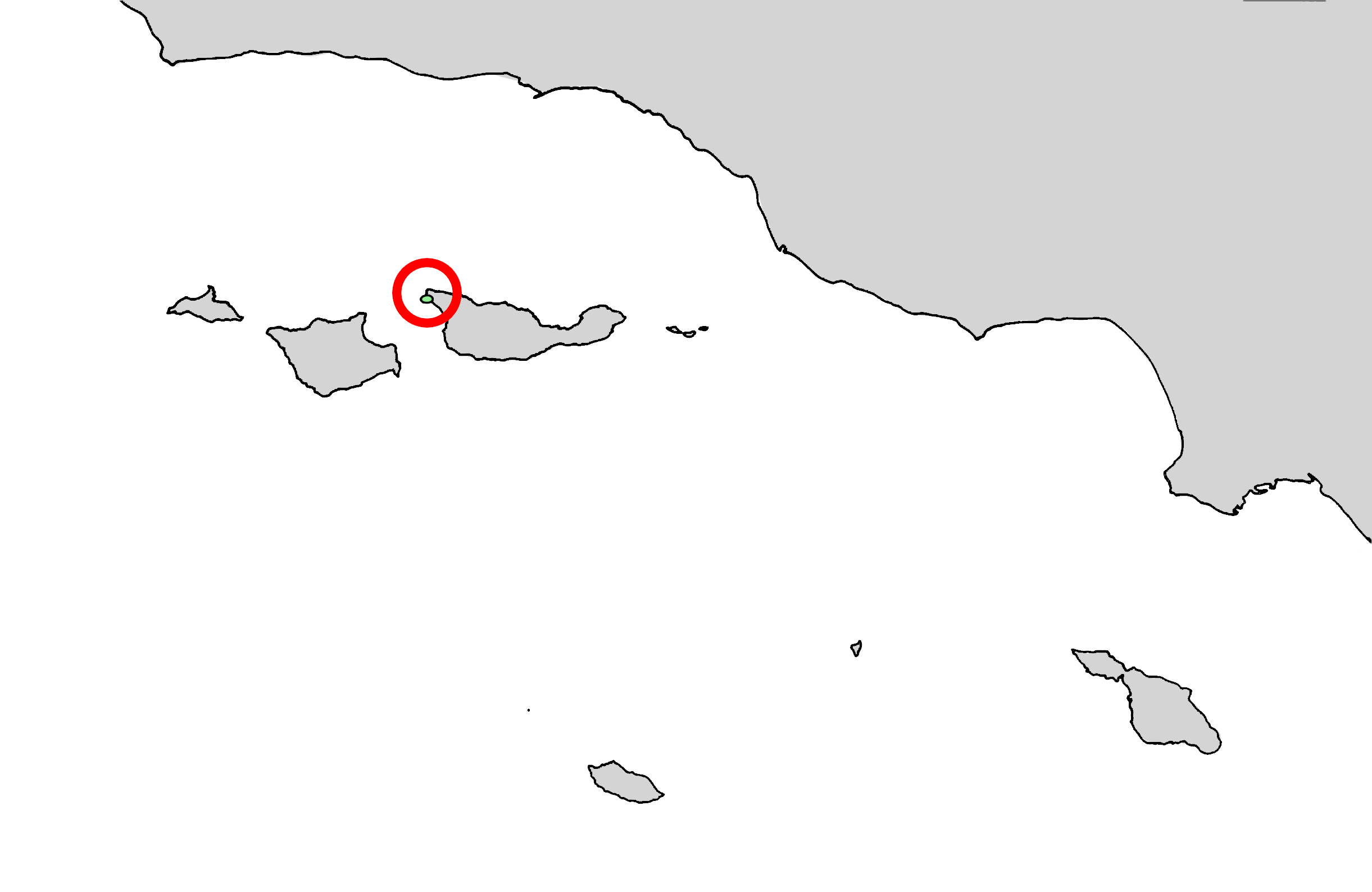
- Natural range of Dudleya nesiotica

= Dudleya nesiotica =

Species of succulent

Dudleya nesiotica is a very rare succulent plant known by the common name Santa Cruz Island liveforever. This Dudleya is endemic to Santa Cruz Island, one of the Channel Islands of California. This is a squat plant growing in mats on the rocky, exposed ground of the windswept island. It is a federally listed threatened species.

== Description ==
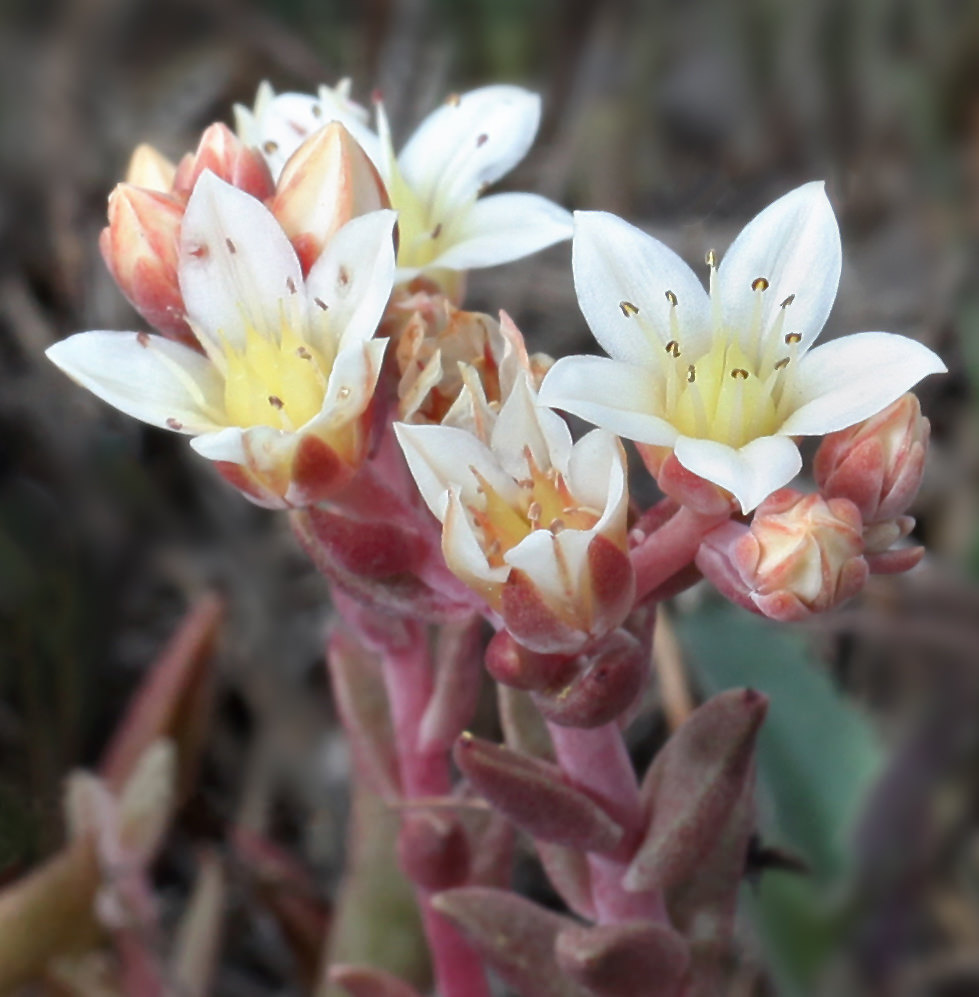
Inflorescence of the Santa Cruz Island liveforever

Dudleya nesiotica bears a few pointed or rounded leaves during the winter months when moisture is available, and it goes dormant during the summer, leaving behind only its tough caudex. It blooms in short inflorescences of small white star-shaped flowers. It is self-compatible, so it can reproduce without receiving the pollen of another plant.

== Ecology ==
Various mosses and lichens may be beneficial to the germination of the seeds of this plant by adding nutrients, moisture, substrate, and protection from snails and slugs.

== Conservation ==
This plant is known from a single population which is spread over about 32 acres (13 ha) of land on this island. The population ranges between 4000 and 260,000 individual plants. All the plants occur on land which is owned and protected by The Nature Conservancy.

There are several factors affecting the abundance of this species. It has been impacted by habitat loss and degradation, including the loss of soil on the island. This was the result of introduced species such as pigs, cows, and sheep, as well as non-native weeds. The soil became compacted and eroded, and it lost the upper layers of leaf litter and cryptobiotic crust. Soil loss is continuing even after the removal of the non-native mammals.

This plant may hybridize with some of its relatives, including D. greenei and D. candelabrum.
