= Polyploid complex =

Group of interrelated and interbreeding species that also have differing levels of ploidy

A polyploid complex, also called a diploid-polyploid complex, is a group of interrelated and interbreeding species that also have differing levels of ploidy that can allow interbreeding.

A polyploid complex was described by E. B. Babcock and G. Ledyard Stebbins in their 1938 monograph The American Species of Crepis: their interrelationships and distribution as affected by polyploidy and apomixis. In Crepis and some other perennial plant species, a polyploid complex may arise where there are at least two genetically isolated diploid populations, in addition to auto- and allopolyploid derivatives that coexist and interbreed. Thus a complex network of interrelated forms may exist where the polyploid forms allow for intermediate forms between the diploid species that are otherwise unable to interbreed.

This complex situation does not fit well within the biological species concept of Ernst Mayr which defines a species as "groups of actually or potentially interbreeding natural populations which are reproductively isolated from other such groups".

In many diploid-polyploid complexes the polyploid hybrid members reproduce asexually while diploids reproduce sexually. Thus polyploidy is related to the phenomenon called "geographic parthenogenesis" by zoologist Albert Vandel, that asexual organisms often have greater geographic ranges than their sexual relatives. It is not known which of the associated factors is the major determiner of geographic parthenogenesis, hybridization, polyploidy, or asexual reproduction.

== See also ==
- Species complex
