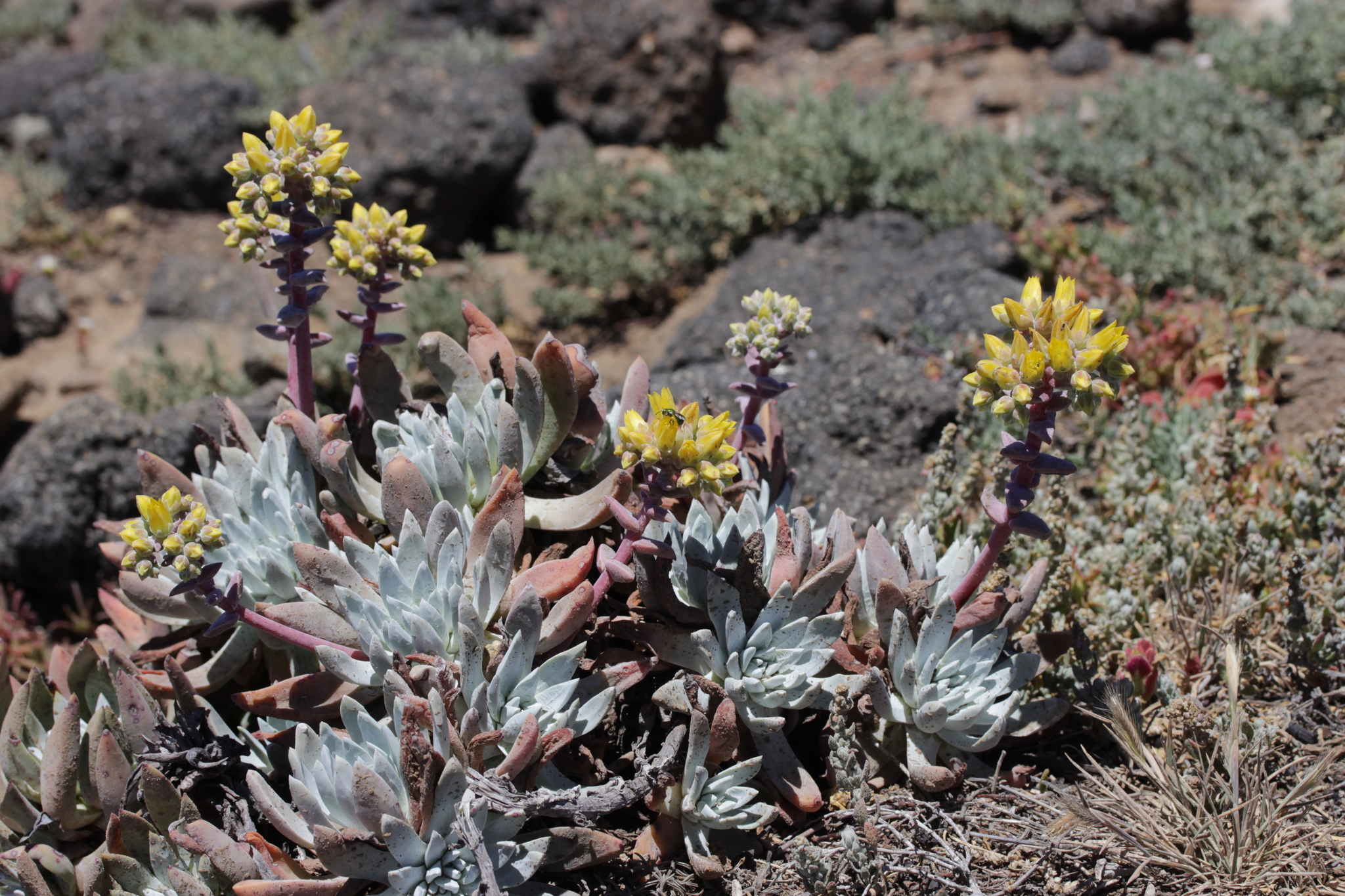

Conservation status
- Vulnerable (NatureServe)

Scientific classification
- Kingdom: Plantae
- Clade: Tracheophytes
- Clade: Angiosperms
- Clade: Eudicots
- Order: Saxifragales
- Family: Crassulaceae
- Genus: Dudleya
- Species: D. greenei

Binomial name
- Dudleya greenei Rose
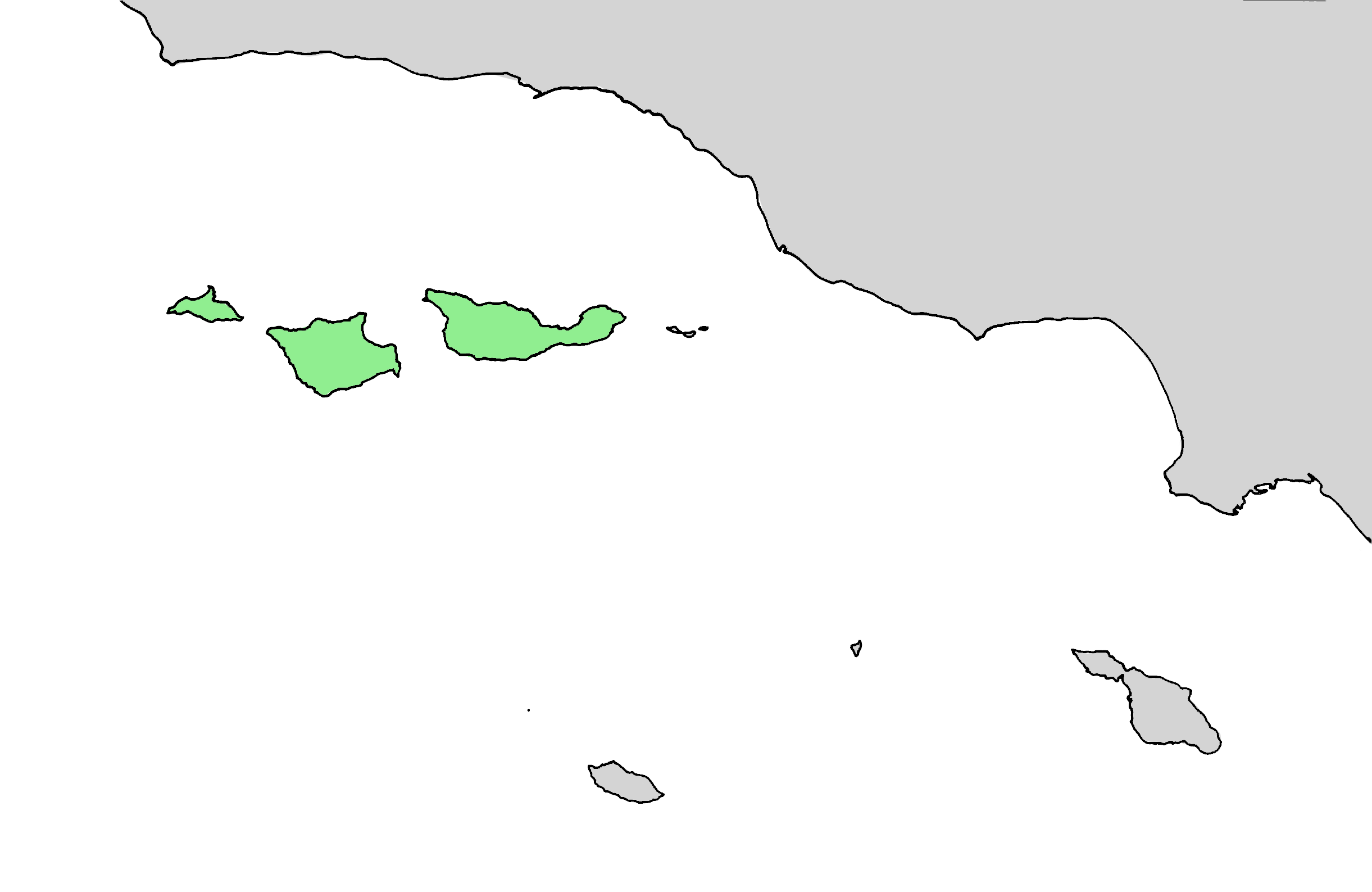
- Natural range of Dudleya greenei

Synonyms
- Cotyledon greenei (Rose) Clokey; Dudleya echeverioides Johanss.; Dudleya hoffmannii Johanss.; Dudleya regalis Johanss.; Echeveria greenei (Rose) A.Berger

= Dudleya greenei =

Species of succulent

Dudleya greenei is a perennial species of succulent plant known by the common names Greene's liveforever, or Greene's dudleya. It is endemic to the Channel Islands of California, where it grows along the cliffs of four of the eight islands. It is a highly variable plant, presenting with multiple forms and varying levels of ploidy. Taxonomically, this species is an insular segregate of Dudleya caespitosa, and was placed as a stopgap taxon by Reid Moran in his 1951 thesis on the genus. It is characterized by white or green leaf rosettes, loomed over by inflorescences bearing pale yellow to white flowers. It is a member of the subgenus Dudleya, as it cannot be propagated from leaf cuttings, does not grow from a corm, and has tight petals.

== Description ==
=== Morphology ===
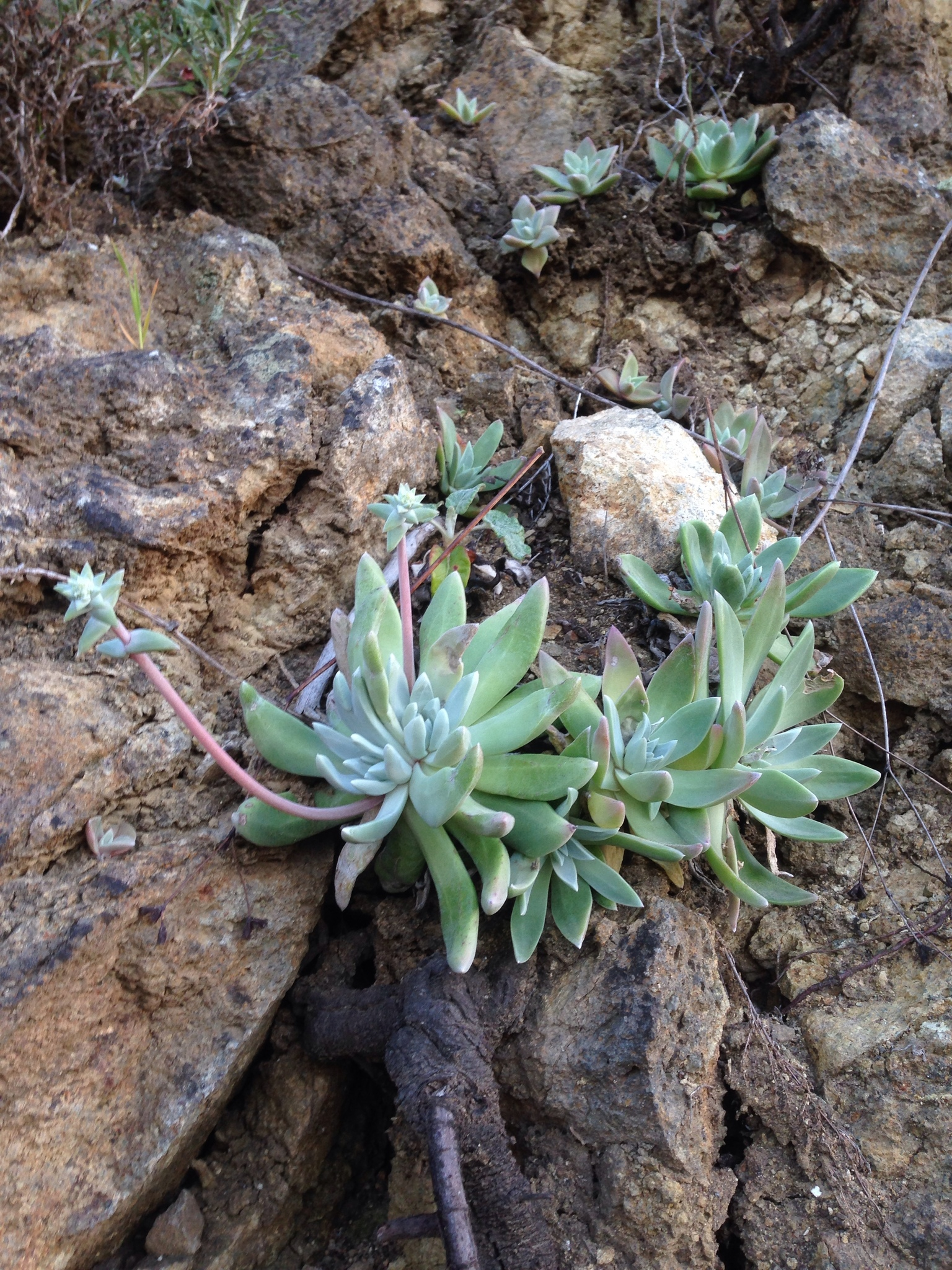
In habitat.

This species of Dudleya may or may not be caespitose; it can form clumps up to 1 meter wide. It may have anywhere from 1 to 100+ rosettes. Each rosette can range anywhere from 5 to 46 cm wide. The caudex is 2 to 5 cm wide, and may become elongated. Unlike the nearby D. candelabrum, the caudex is not swollen at the base. The leaves are evergreen, and are 3 to 22 cm long, 1 to 3.5 cm wide, and 4 to 8 mm thick. The leaf shape is variable. They may be covered in a white epicuticular wax, or present green. The base of the leaf is generally 1 to 3 cm wide, and may wound red or yellow when detached from the stem. The tip of the leaf is generally acute, while the margins of the leaves generally have 0 to 1 angles between the upper and lower leaf surfaces.

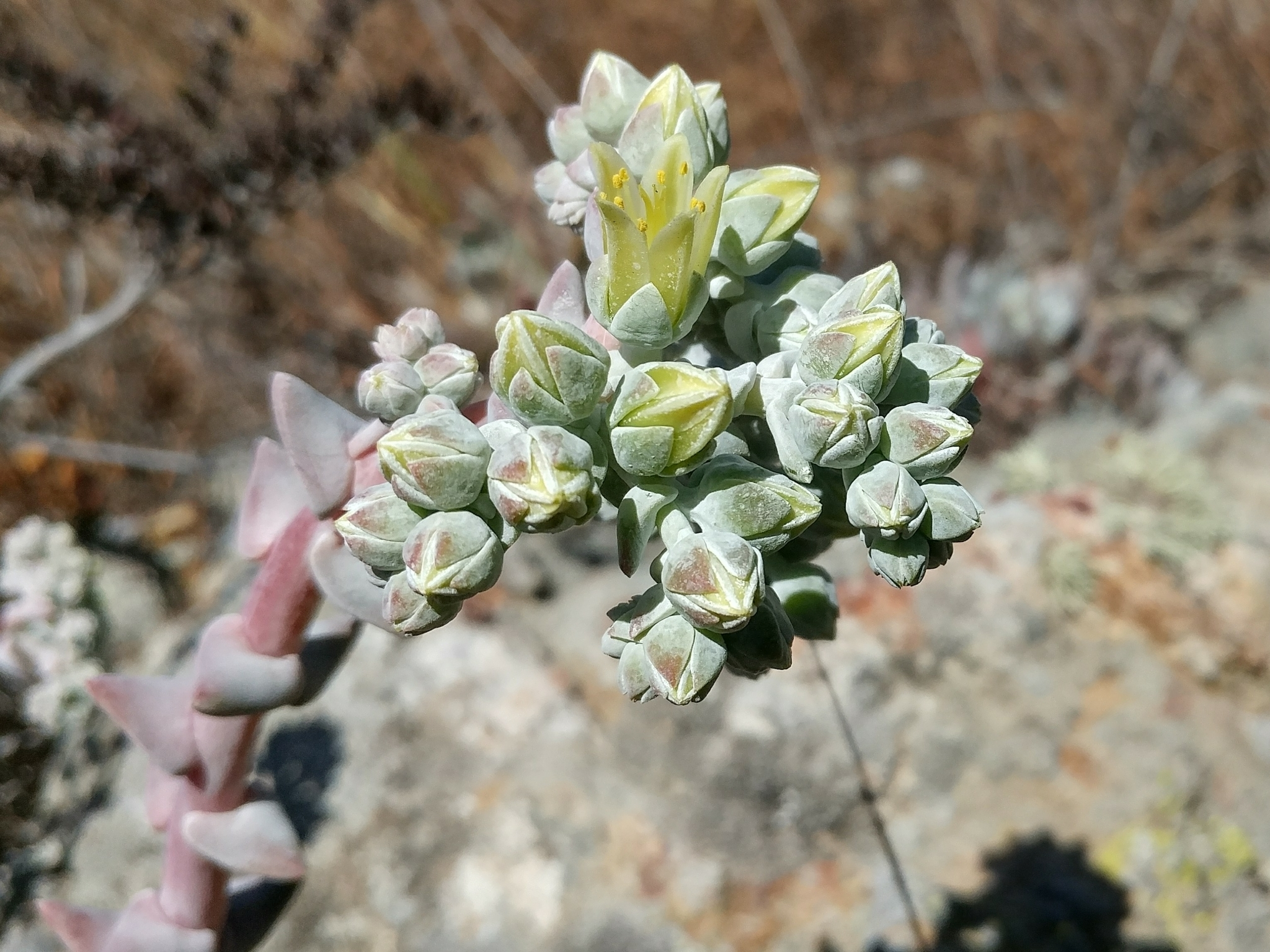
The nascent inflorescence.

The peduncle is 4.5 to 50 cm tall, and 3 to 5 mm wide. There are typically 3 first degree branches on the inflorescence, which may rebranch 0 to 2 more times. The terminal branches are 1 to 9 cm long, and hold 2 to 15 flowers. The bracts are 10 to 30 mm long, and 5 to 12 mm wide. The bracts are shaped lanceolate to oblong, and are more or less thick; they are also not bent backwards (reflexed). The pedicels are 1 to 5 mm long.

The flower has sepals 1.5 to 5 mm long, shaped deltate. The petals are 8 to 12 mm long, 3 to 5 mm wide, and are connate (fused to form a tubular corolla) 1.5 to 2.5 mm. The petals are shaped elliptic, have an acute apex, and are pale yellow to more or less white (especially white on the margins). The pistils are connivent and erect.

Flowering is from May to July.

== Taxonomy ==
As defined by botanist Reid Moran, this species is an insular segregate of the Dudleya caespitosa complex. It is an extremely variable species that appears somewhat different on each island. There are little characteristics that can unambiguously separate D. greenei and D. caespitosa, although there are extreme, unmatched characteristics on both sides, such as out-curved petals and numerous rosettes leaves in D. greenei and red petals and thin leaves in D. caespitosa. The chromosome number is n = 34, 51, making it tetraploid and hexaploid in respect to the basic chromosome number of the genus.

=== Taxonomic history ===
The first collection of this plant was made by Edward Lee Greene in 1886, on Santa Cruz Island in the Channel Islands of California. In their 1903 work on the North American Crassulaceae, Joseph Nelson Rose and Nathaniel Lord Britton circumscribed the genus Dudleya. The species Dudleya greenei was described off of Greene's collection by Rose.

in 1932, botanist Donald A. Johansen, writing in his "Contributions Toward a Monograph of the Genus Dudleya," published within the Cactus and Succulent Society of America's journal, described two new species from the Channel Islands based on collections made by Ralph Hoffmann, a naturalist and explorer of the islands who died the same year after an accident on San Miguel Island. Hoffmann made several collections of Dudleya from San Miguel Island, its adjacent islets, and Santa Rosa Island.

Johansen named Dudleya hoffmannii and Dudleya regalis from collections by Hoffmann on Prince Island, which is off of San Miguel Island. D. regalis was noted as distinct for its white flowers and size and number of rosettes. The specific epithet of D. regalis is a reference to the name of the island, and also due to their "regal" appearance described by Johansen. D. hoffmannii, named in honor of Hoffmann a few months after his fatal fall, was noted for its similarities to Dudleya septentrionalis (now Dudleya farinosa) and Dudleya helleri (now Dudleya caespitosa).

In 1935, Johansen named Dudleya echeverioides based on specimens collected in 1930 by the late Hoffmann on Santa Rosa Island. Johansen recognized D. echeverioides as being unusually distinct based on the sweetly-scented flowers, that he described as having an odor "unmistakably resembling that of woodland violets." The specific epithet was named after the plant's appearance to other succulents in the genus Echeveria.

Reid Moran, working on the taxonomy of the genus for his 1951 dissertation, revisited several of the new plants named by Johansen. Moran found D. hoffmannii to be similar to D. farinosa, corroborating Johansen's report. Gentry also reported the plants as D. farinosa. Moran recognized that D. regalis differed from D. hoffmannii with its narrower green leaves, more complex inflorescences, and more spreading petals. However, when in the field, Moran found both of these plants as well as ones with various combinations of their character. As all plants studied cytologically were revealed to be hexaploid, and with the plants intermingling both morphologically and being interfertile, the segregation of both entities was dropped in favor of placing them under D. greenei.

Plants matching the description of the odorous flowers of D. echeverioides could not be located by Moran, and with an apparent loss of the type specimen and a lack of an illustration, the original description made no distinction as to why the plant would be morphologically different from D. greenei. Moran then subsequently combined it with D. greenei.

Although Moran kept D. greenei alive as a taxon as "a matter of temporary convenience," he never published his 1951 dissertation, and thus this species has remained valid into the 21st century.

== Distribution and habitat ==
This species is distributed throughout the northern Channel Islands: Santa Cruz, San Miguel, and Santa Rosa islands with the exception of Anacapa. Plants on Anacapa are D. caespitosa. It is found on coastal cliffs and rock outcrops. Tetraploid representatives of this species are also present on Catalina Island. However, some plants with campanulate flowers on Catalina may be of hybrid origin between Dudleya greenei and Dudleya virens subsp. insularis.

== Conservation ==
This species is threatened by trampling from cattle and other feral herbivores on Santa Rosa Island. It is also threatened by poaching.

== See also ==
- Dudleya caespitosa
- Dudleya guadalupensis
- Dudleya gnoma
