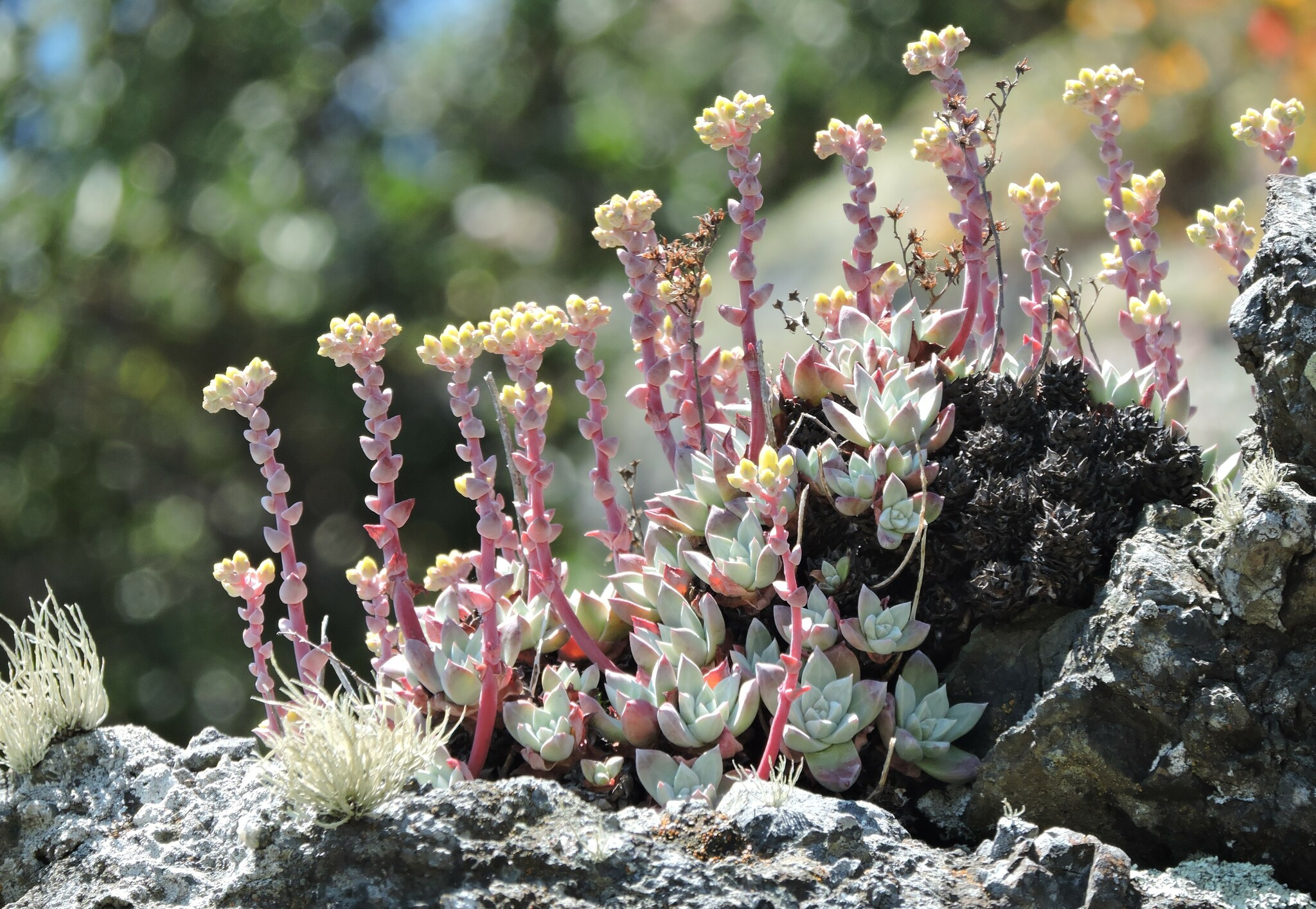

Conservation status
- Apparently Secure (NatureServe)

Scientific classification
- Kingdom: Plantae
- Clade: Tracheophytes
- Clade: Angiosperms
- Clade: Eudicots
- Order: Saxifragales
- Family: Crassulaceae
- Genus: Dudleya
- Species: D. farinosa

Binomial name
- Dudleya farinosa (Lindl.) Britt. & Rose
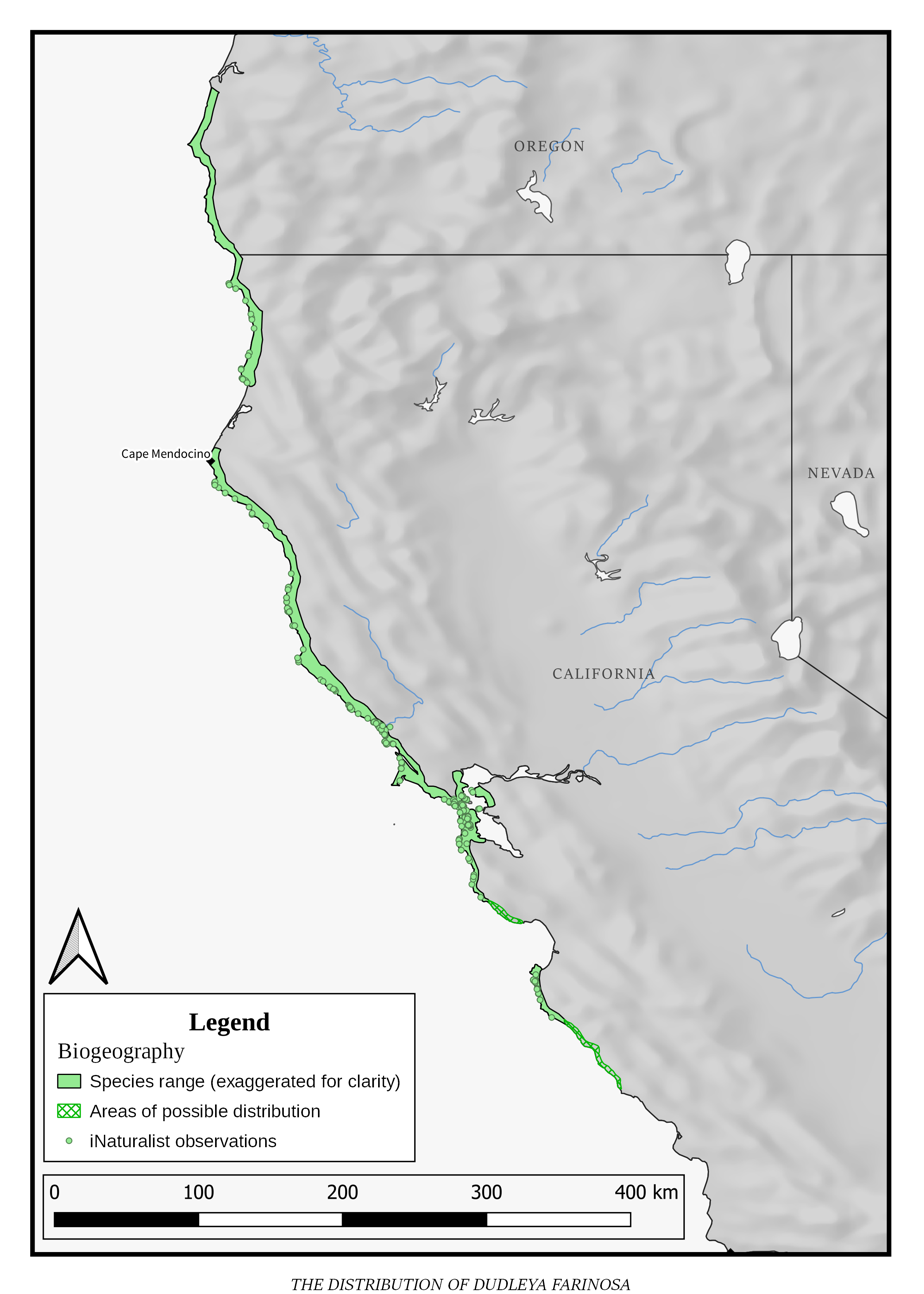
- Natural range of Dudleya farinosa

Synonyms
- Basionym: Echeveria farinosa Lindl.; Alphabetical list: Cotyledon compacta (Rose) Fedde; Cotyledon eastwoodiae (Rose) Fedde; Cotyledon farinosa Baker; Cotyledon farinulenta (Lem.) Hemsl.; Cotyledon lingula S.Watson; Cotyledon septentrionalis (Rose) Fedde; Dudleya compacta Rose; Dudleya eastwoodiae Rose; Dudleya lingula (S.Watson) Britton & Rose; Dudleya septentrionalis Rose; Echeveria compacta (Rose) A.Berger; Echeveria eastwoodiae (Rose) A.Berger; Echeveria farinulenta Lem.; Echeveria lingula (S.Watson) A.Nelson & J.F.Macbr.; Echeveria septentrionalis (Rose) A.Berger

= Dudleya farinosa =

Species of succulent

Dudleya farinosa is a species of succulent plant in the family Crassulaceae known by several common names, including bluff lettuce, powdery liveforever, and powdery dudleya. A coastal plant of northern California and southern Oregon, it is typically found on ocean bluffs just directly above the reach of the waves, and sometimes inland. Its appearance is characterized by lotus-like rosettes of beveled leaves, and in summer the plant erects a tall pink to red peduncle densely covered in bracts, topped with branches of pale yellow flowers. The green or white rosettes of this plant can be seen covering stretches of rocky coast and nearby islets.

Although Dudleya farinosa is common throughout its range, it is often targeted by plant poachers, and high-profile incidents of poaching in the 2010s have alarmed conservationists. The demand for the plant is primarily driven by a community of succulent collectors in East Asia, who find the aesthetic properties of the plants desirable, commanding high prices. Thousands of plants have been taken in single incidents, causing significant damage to populations. Poached plants are unlikely to survive in foreign environments and the targeted populations may suffer losses of genetic diversity. Anti-poaching efforts include law enforcement actions, anti-poaching and protection laws for Dudleya, and commercial nurseries saturating the market with cultivated plants to curb demand.

== Description ==
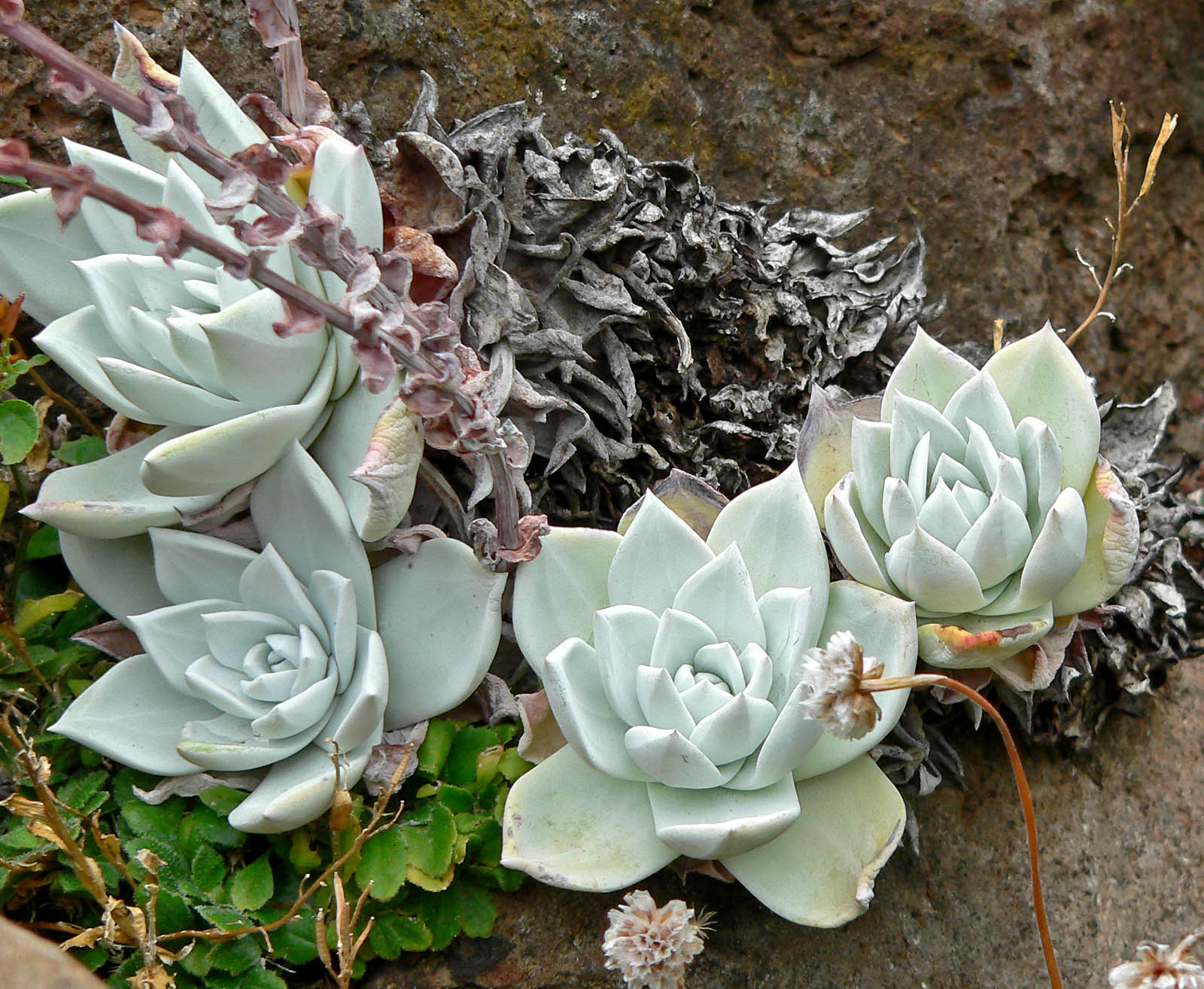
The characteristic rosettes of D. farinosa with their beveled edges.

The rosettes of Dudleya farinosa are borne from the thick, woody and succulent stems, which are otherwise known as caudices. As the plants are generally rooted in vertical bluffs and cliffs, the caudices in age become decumbent or pendent, hanging downwards from their point of origin. On the tip of the caudex is the rosette, which is a circular arrangement of the vegetative leaves. The older, outer leaves of the rosette dry out during the dormant season and are pushed backwards as the rosette and the stem grow forwards. This gives the species an abundance of dried and dead leaves covering the stem; distinguishing it from the relatively leafless stem of Dudleya caespitosa.

Plants are usually seen with multiple rosettes and stems. Multiple rosettes and stems can be formed from a single plant by a process described as "multiplication by division," but better known as dichotomous branching. The primary rosette divides in the center and the two points eventually grow apart until they form two branches with their own rosettes. This process repeats continuously in this species, forming clumps of as little as 4 rosettes to large mats of up to 60 rosettes on a single plant. Axillary branches are not formed in this species.

A leaf-succulent, the rosettes consist of short, thick, and pointed leaves, sometimes covered heavily in a farina, or epicuticular wax, used to shield the plant from the sun and water. (In another species in the genus, Dudleya brittonii, the thick white wax represents a material with the highest measured ultraviolet reflectivity recorded in any plant.) Another form of D. farinosa lacks the white wax, and presents with green and glossy foliage. Stress, cool wind, sunshine, and exposure can cause the edges or tips of the leaves to turn red, maroon or violet.

To sexually reproduce, before the summer the plant begins to erect a tall stalk (called a peduncle) that will bear the inflorescence. The peduncle is covered in 20 to 35 leaves (the leaves on the peduncle and inflorescences are referred to as bracts), similar in color to the vegetative leaves on the rosette. When the structure matures, the stalk divides into 3 to 5 branches (which may sometimes divide once more) that bear the flowers, giving an overall flat-topped shape to the flower-covered inflorescence topping the peduncle. The pale-yellow flowers, attached to tiny and erect stalks on the branches known as pedicels, face topside and have a somewhat tubular shape to them.

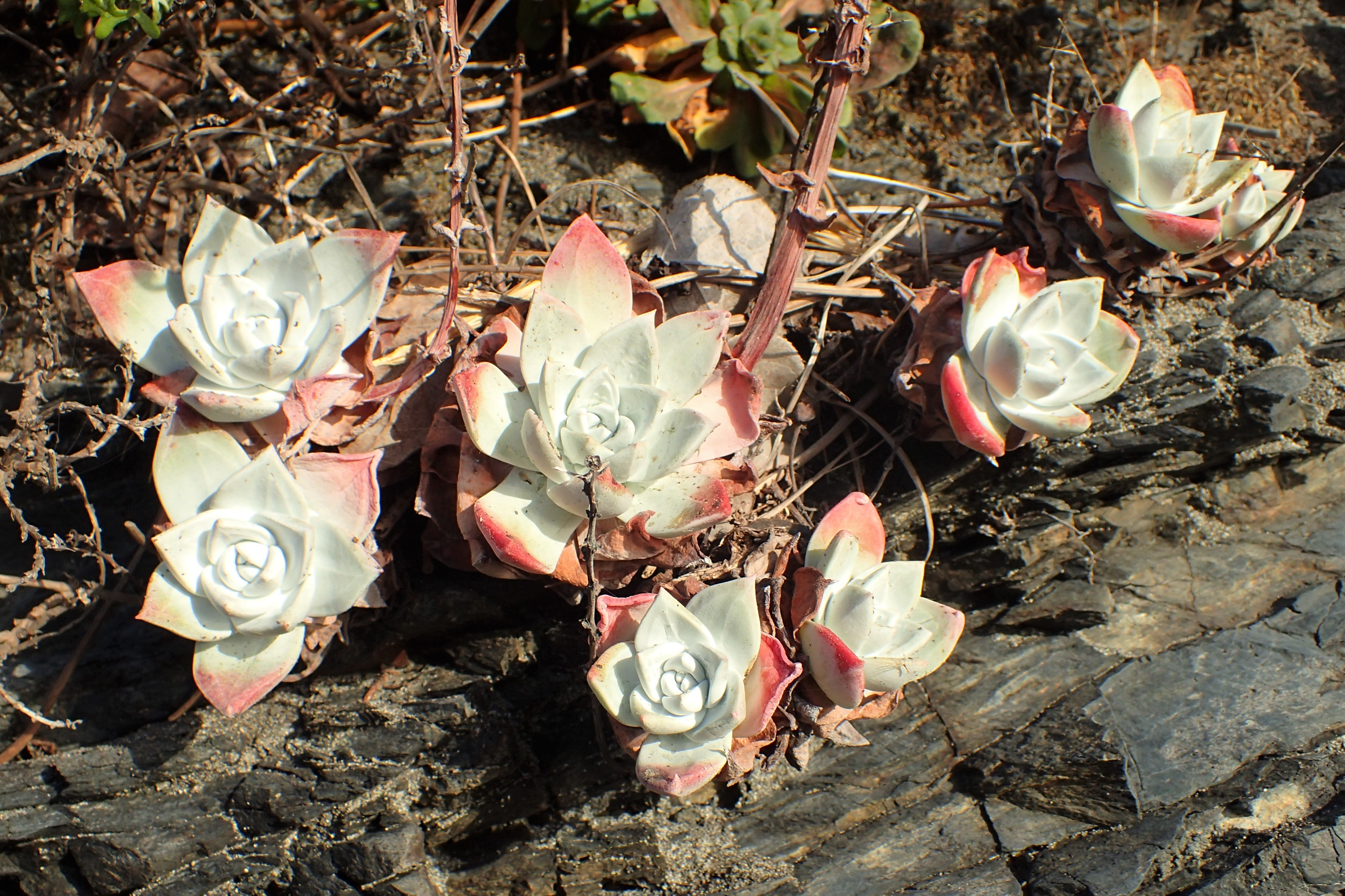
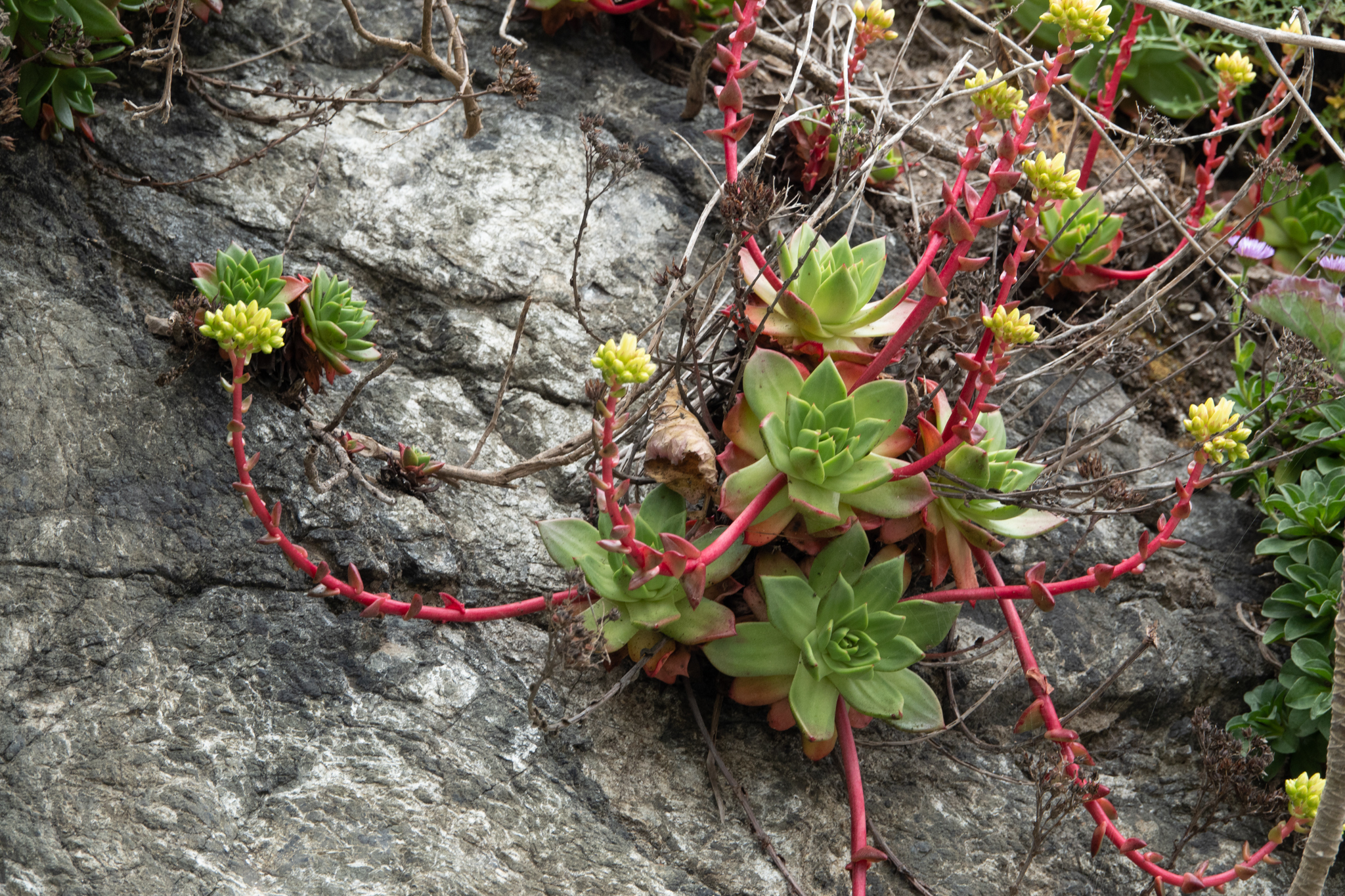
Variations in the glaucescence of D. farinosa. The first plant is white due to its waxy coating. The second plant is green and glossy and lacks the wax.

=== Morphology ===
Stems / caudices: The caudices are caespitose, branching apically and absent of axillary branches. They measure between 10–60 cm (3.9–23.6 in) long and 1–3 cm (0.39–1.18 in) wide, and are usually not elongate. The older parts of the stem are typically not visible between the dried leaves.

Rosettes: Plants have 4 to 60 rosettes, which measure 4–25 cm (1.6–9.8 in) wide. The rosettes have 15 to 30 leaves.

Leaves: The leaves are evergreen, and may be gray or green, becoming reddish. They measure 2.5–6 cm (0.98–2.36 in) long by 1–2.5 cm (0.39–0.98 in) wide and 5–9 mm (0.20–0.35 in) thick. The base of the leaf is 1–2.5 cm (0.39–0.98 in) wide. The leaf shape is oblong-ovate, and the tip is acute or generally obtuse. The surfaces are sometimes farinose. The leaf margin tends to have 2 or more angles between the upper and lower faces of the leaf.

Inflorescence(s): The peduncle is 10–35 cm (3.9–13.8 in) tall, and measures 3–8 mm (0.12–0.31 in) wide. The peduncle then divides into 3 or 5 close-set branches, which may sometimes branch bifurcately themselves. The terminal branches (cincinni) measure 1–3.5 cm (0.39–1.38 in) long, and are ascending in age. The terminal branches bear 3 to 11 flowers on them, on pedicels that are 1–3 mm (0.039–0.118 in) long. The pedicels are erect and do not bend in fruit. The flowers face topside, and their terminal branches are not twisted.

Bracts: There are 20 to 35 bracts on the inflorescences. The bracts are arranging in a spreading fashion, and are shaped cordate-ovate, measuring 10–25 mm (0.39–0.98 in) long by 10–20 mm (0.39–0.79 in) wide, with an acute apex.

Flowers: The calyx measures 5–8 mm (0.20–0.31 in) long by 5–6 mm (0.20–0.24 in) wide. The sepals are 3–7 mm (0.12–0.28 in) long, and are shaped deltate-ovate. The petals are 10–14 mm (0.39–0.55 in) long by 3–5 mm (0.12–0.20 in) wide, and are connate (fused) 1–2 mm (0.039–0.079 in). The petals are shaped oblanceolate, the apex acute to obtuse, the tips often out curved, and colored pale yellow. The upper margins of the adjacent petals are not touching. The corolla is loosely tubular, and not tightly pentagonal. The pistils are connivent and erect, and the follicles are erect.

==== Non-convolute corolla ====
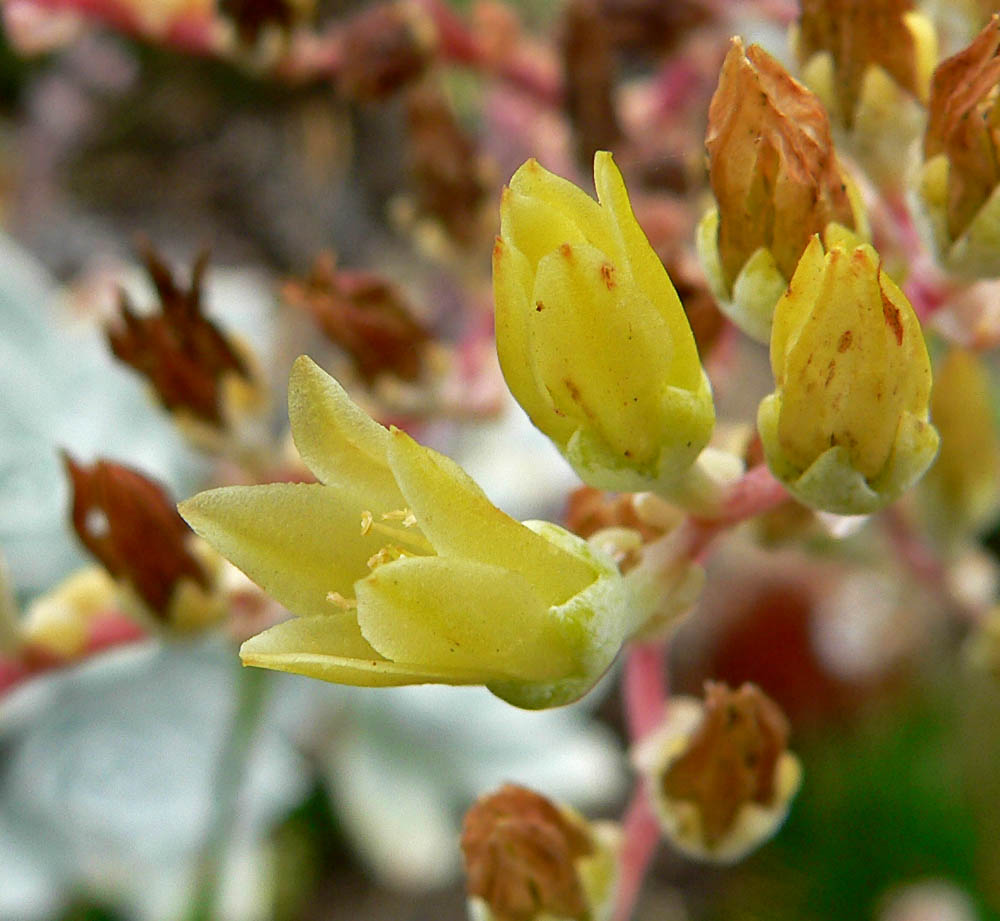
D. farinosa (northern form) flowers at the Regional Parks Botanic Garden.

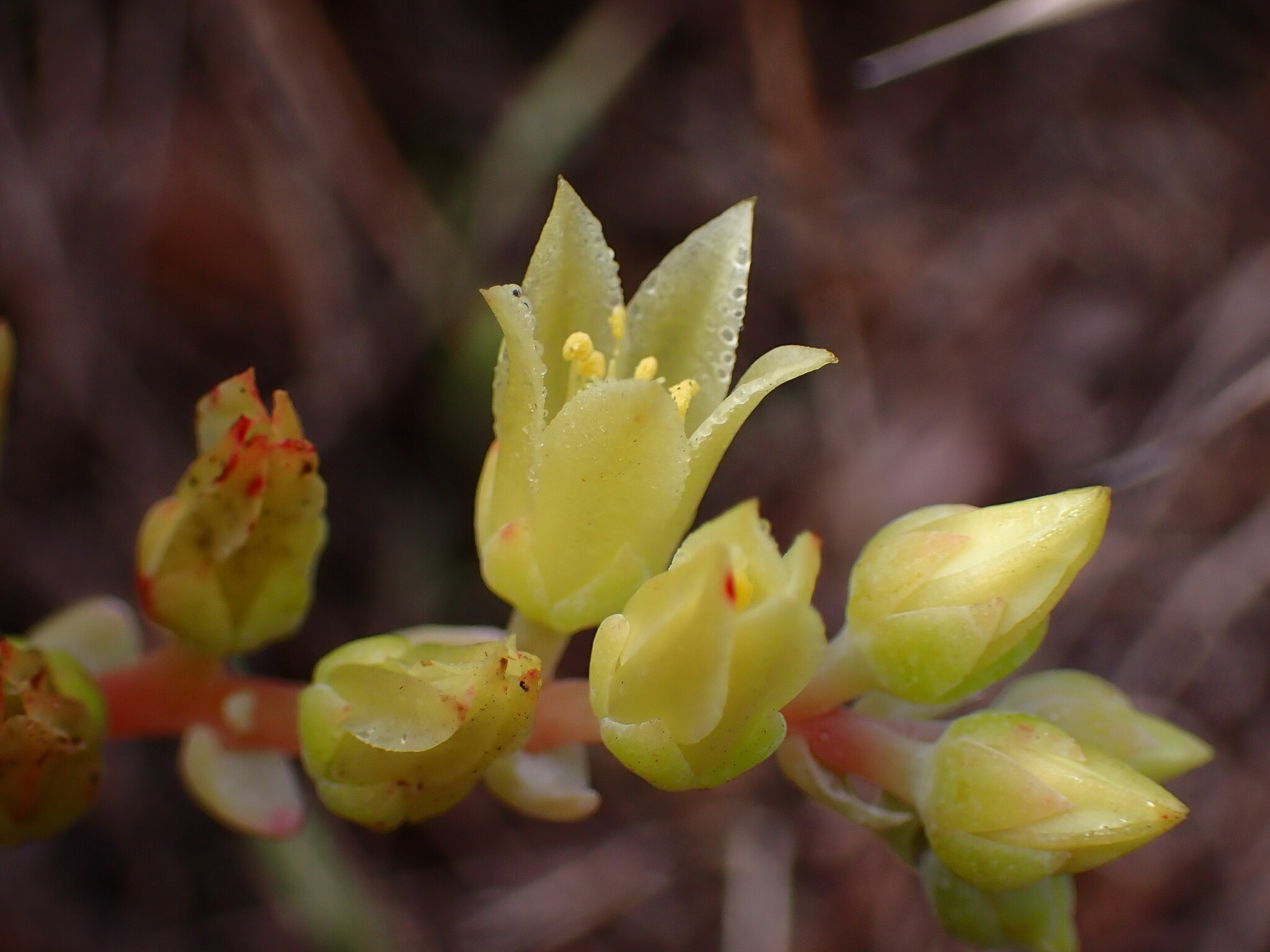
D. farinosa flowers at the Marin Headlands, Marin County.

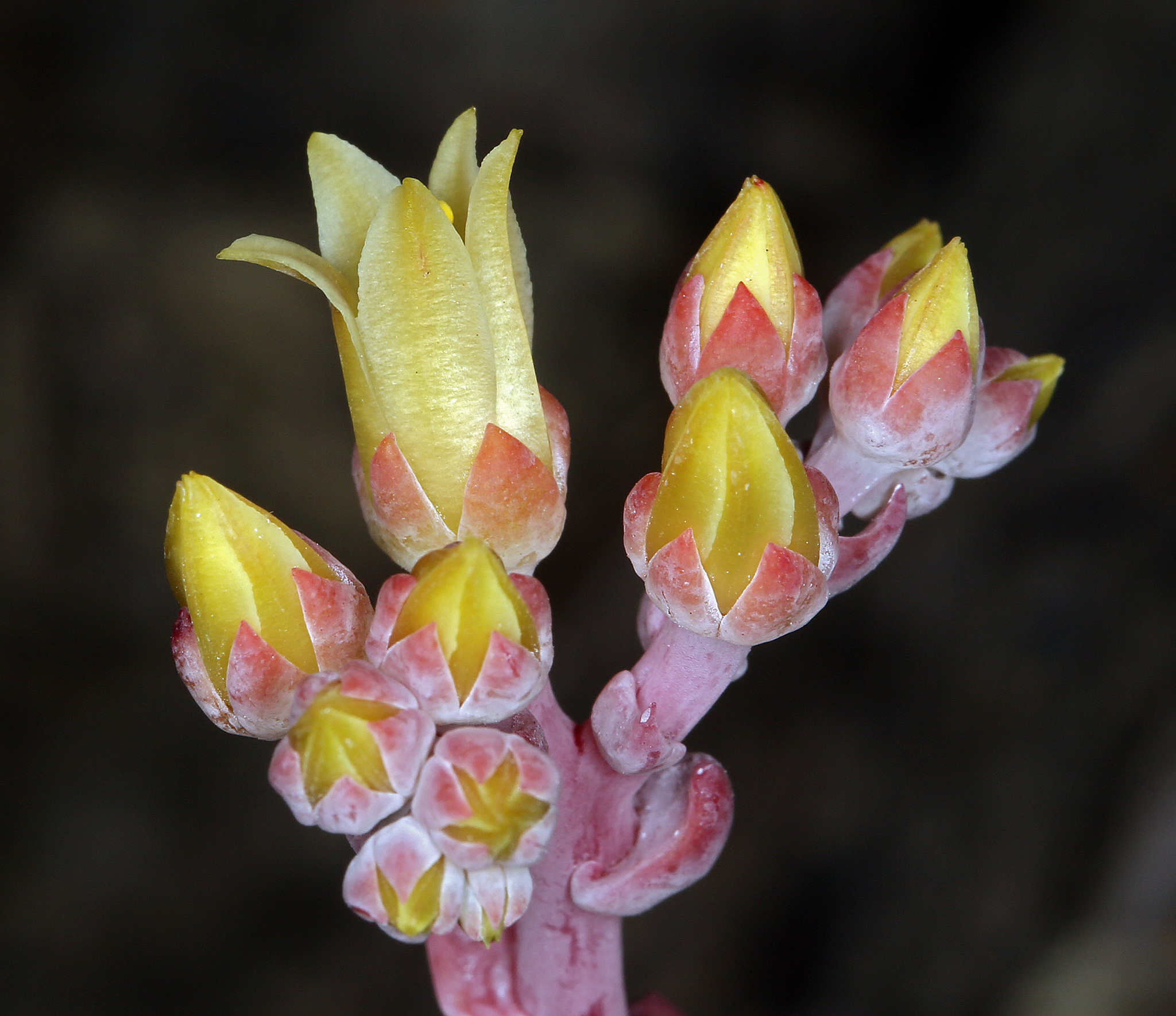
D. farinosa flowers at Ring Mountain, Marin County, showing introgression with Dudleya cymosa.

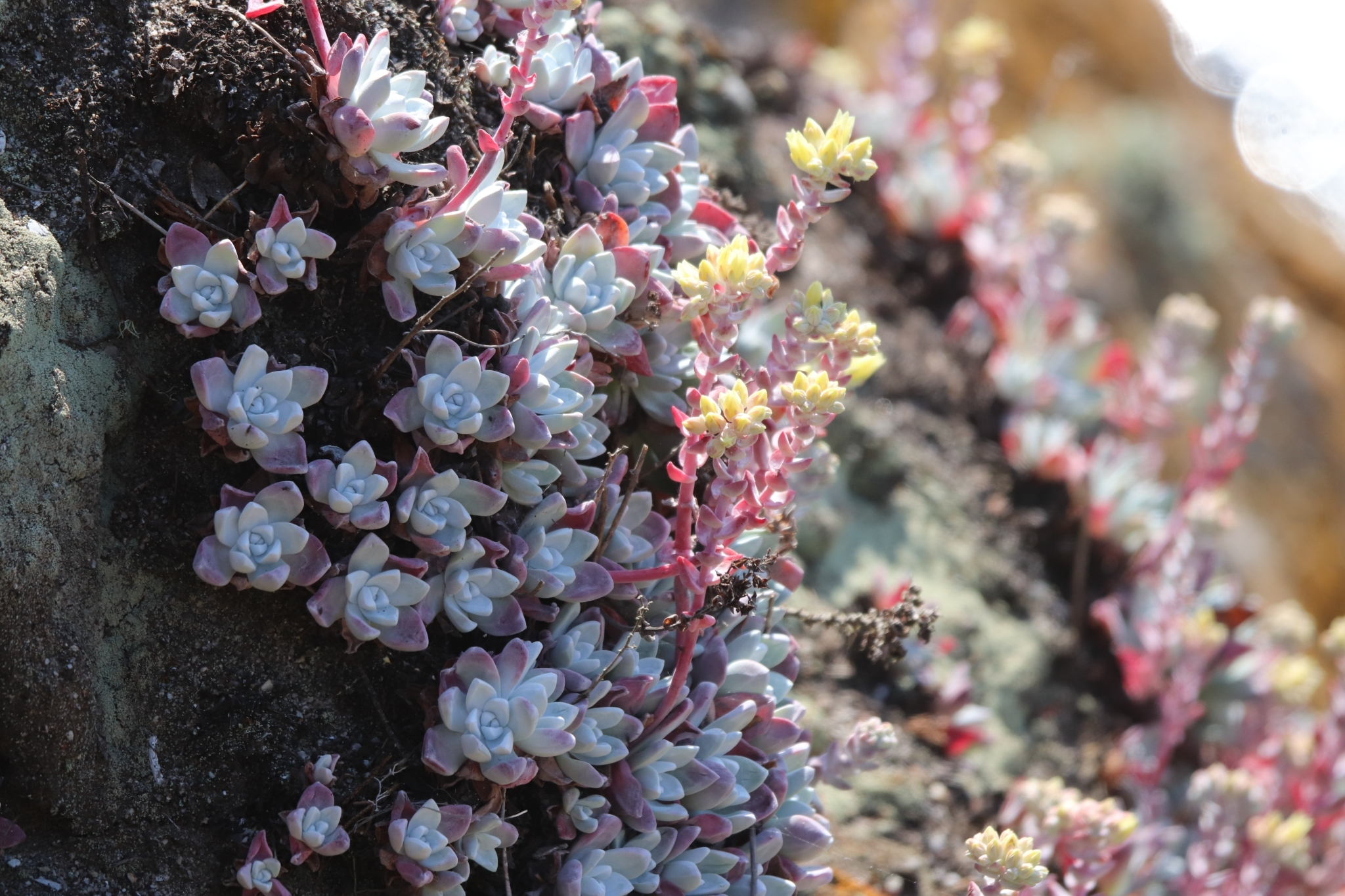
A large clump of D. farinosa starting to flower. Point Lobos, Monterey County.

This species is unusual in the genus because some of the populations of this plant have non-convolute petals. The petals of almost all other Dudleya are convolute, with each petal having one edge exposed and the other covered by the next petal. In the subgenus Dudleya, each petal is folded along the midline, with the exposed edge tightly connivent to the inner edge of the next petal, which forms a connate pentagonal tube adapted to hummingbird pollinators. However, in D. farinosa, the petals are not as strongly folded and instead mostly flat, and with the exposed edge of each petal not connivent to the inner edge of the next one, but rather somewhat separated, giving the corolla a loosely tubular shape. In the northern part of its range, D. farinosa has corollas that are often completely non-convolute, a trait shared only by one other species, the morphologically dissimilar Dudleya variegata, which has plesiomorphic Sedum-like flowers and a corm-like stem.

== Taxonomy ==
=== Taxonomic history ===
==== Early treatment (1847–1900) ====
This type specimen of this species was first collected by Theodor Hartweg around 1847, in a locality described as the "Rocks near Carmel Bay, California." A photograph of the type specimen, as well the description and type locality, indicates that the type was collected from the populations of this species growing on the rocky bluffs of the Monterey Peninsula. There, the species is well separated from Dudleya caespitosa, as it grows only on the granitic rocks just above the reach of the waves, while D. caespitosa is found more landwards and with a different morphology, namely more saturated yellow flowers, narrower, green leaves, and a more slender and less leafier inflorescence.

Based on Hartweg's collection, John Lindley described the species as Echeveria farinosa. Lindley's description emphasizes the epicuticular wax on the leaves as "if they had been powdered with flour." He also notes the "remarkable whiteness" of the leaves and the pale lemon flowers as being two characters that clearly delimited the species. Lindley also described D. caespitosa (as a synonym, Echeveria laxa) on the same page.

† E. farinosa ; caulescens, nana, foliis linguiformibus acutis planis candidis adultis viridibus, caule decumbente, racemis secundis corymbosopaniculatis, floribus pedunculatis.

— John Lindley, The Journal of the Horticultural Society of London, v.4 (1849) p. 292

In 1864, Charles Antoine Lemaire modified Lindley's Echeveria farinosa into Echeveria farinulenta. This came after the previous edition of L'Illustration horticole erroneously contained the name Echeveria farinosa twice, once for Lindley's species, and the second for a plant from Joseph zu Salm-Reifferscheidt-Dyck. In order to rectify the conflicting names, (see homonym) Lemaire opted to change the specific name of Lindley's species to farinulenta. In 1880, this change was reflected by William Hemsley in Biologia Centrali-Americana when he created the combination Cotyledon farinulenta.

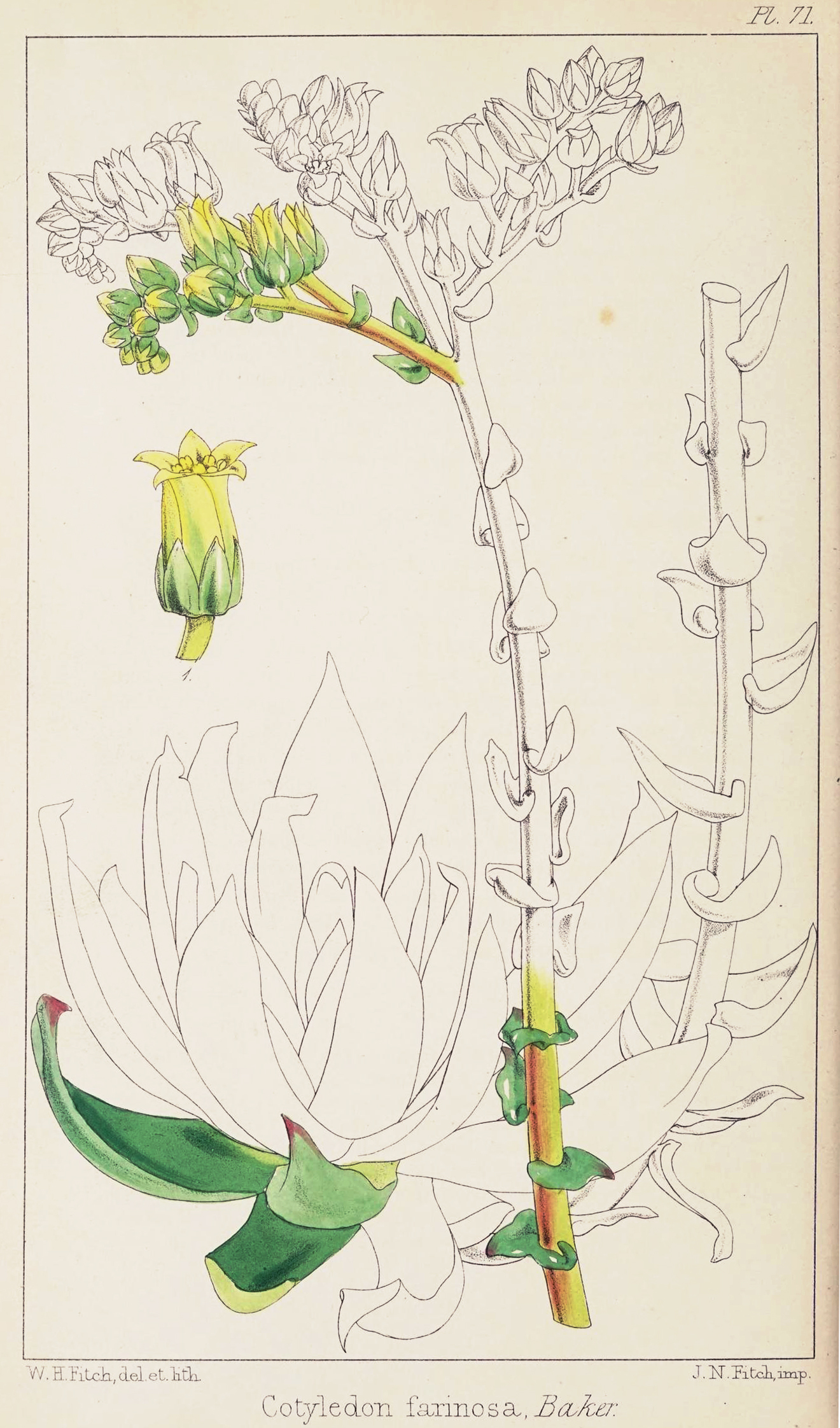
The illustration of Cotyledon farinosa from Saunders's Refugium Botanicum.

In 1869, John Gilbert Baker published a new combination for the species, Cotyledon farinosa, in William Wilson Saunders's Refugium Botanicum, with an accompanying description and illustration. The description was based on plants received by Saunders from the collection of Belgian horticulturalist Louis van Houtte. Saunders provided information relating to the horticulture of the plant and regarded the species as "delicate and beautiful."

==== Modern treatment (1900–present) ====
In 1903, the botanists Nathaniel Lord Britton and Joseph Nelson Rose created the new genus Dudleya, named in honor of William Russel Dudley, which subsumed most of the Echeveria and/or Cotyledon species described in California and the Baja California Peninsula under the new name. In addition, they described 41 new species, recognizing 60 species at the time of publication. They also established the genera Hasseanthus and Stylophyllum, which were later subsumed into Dudleya as well.

Based on Lindley and Baker's description, Britton and Rose created the current combination, Dudleya farinosa. Rose also authored three new species that are currently recognized as heterotypic synonyms of D. farinosa, all based on specimens collected by Alice Eastwood from 1900–1903.

- Dudleya compacta Rose – Described from specimens collected in the San Francisco Bay. Plants with bright green and reddish foliage. Corolla segments acute.
- Dudleya eastwoodiae Rose – Described from specimens collected at Bodega Point, Sonoma County. Plants with green or bronzed foliage, sometimes slightly glaucous. Corolla segments obtuse, tube short. Named after Alice Eastwood.
- Dudleya septentrionalis Rose – Described from specimens collected at Crescent City, Del Norte County. Plants with waxy white foliage. Corolla segments obtuse, tube very short. Named after its northernmost distribution among the Dudleya.

In 1904, German botanist Friedrich Karl Georg Fedde, in the botanical yearbook Just's Botanischer Jahresbericht, recombined all Dudleya back into Cotyledon, but retained the new species created by Britton and Rose, thus reviving Cotyledon farinosa but creating Cotyledon compacta, Cotyledon eastwoodiae, and Cotyledon septentrionalis.

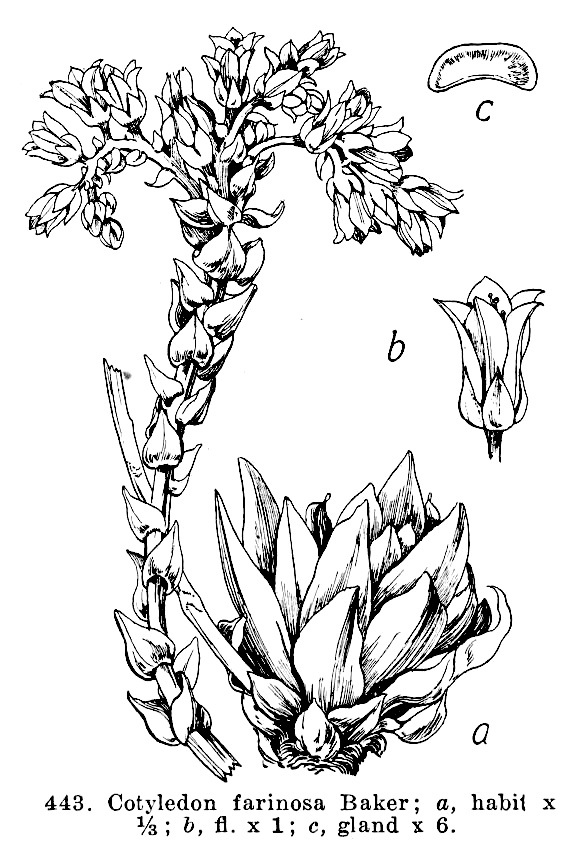
An illustration of Cotyledon farinosa from Jepson's A manual of the flowering plants of California (1923).

Britton and Rose's new genus was not quickly accepted. Into the 1920s and 1930s, botanists such as Willis Lynn Jepson still retained Cotyledon farinosa, while others still used Echeveria, like Alwin Berger. In 1930, Berger, who worked within the Engler system of plant taxonomy, recombined a number of the new species created by Britton and Rose into Echeveria, once again reviving Echeveria farinosa and creating Echeveria compacta, Echeveria eastwoodiae, and Echeveria septentrionalis.

In 1953, cytologist Charles H. Uhl and botanist Reid Moran published the Cytotaxonomy of Dudleya and Hasseanthus in the American Journal of Botany. The article was the first comprehensive cytotaxonomic treatment of the Dudleya. Topotypes of D. farinosa, and the three species Rose split from it, D. compacta, D. eastwoodiae, and D. septentrionalis, were studied cytologically and all were found to have the chromosome number n = 17, the basic chromosome number for the genus. All three of Rose's segregate species were treated as synonyms of D. farinosa.

=== Modern classification ===
Dudleya farinosa is a member of the genus Dudleya and is placed within the subgenus Dudleya. The basionym (the first published scientific name) is Echeveria farinosa Lindl., and the former segregate species Dudleya compacta, Dudleya eastwoodiae, and Dudleya septentrionalis are recognized as heterotypic synonyms of Dudleya farinosa by most taxonomic authorities as of 2023. In addition, a number of homotypic synonyms (detailed above) exist as a result of various recombinations of Lindley's name.

=== Hybridization ===
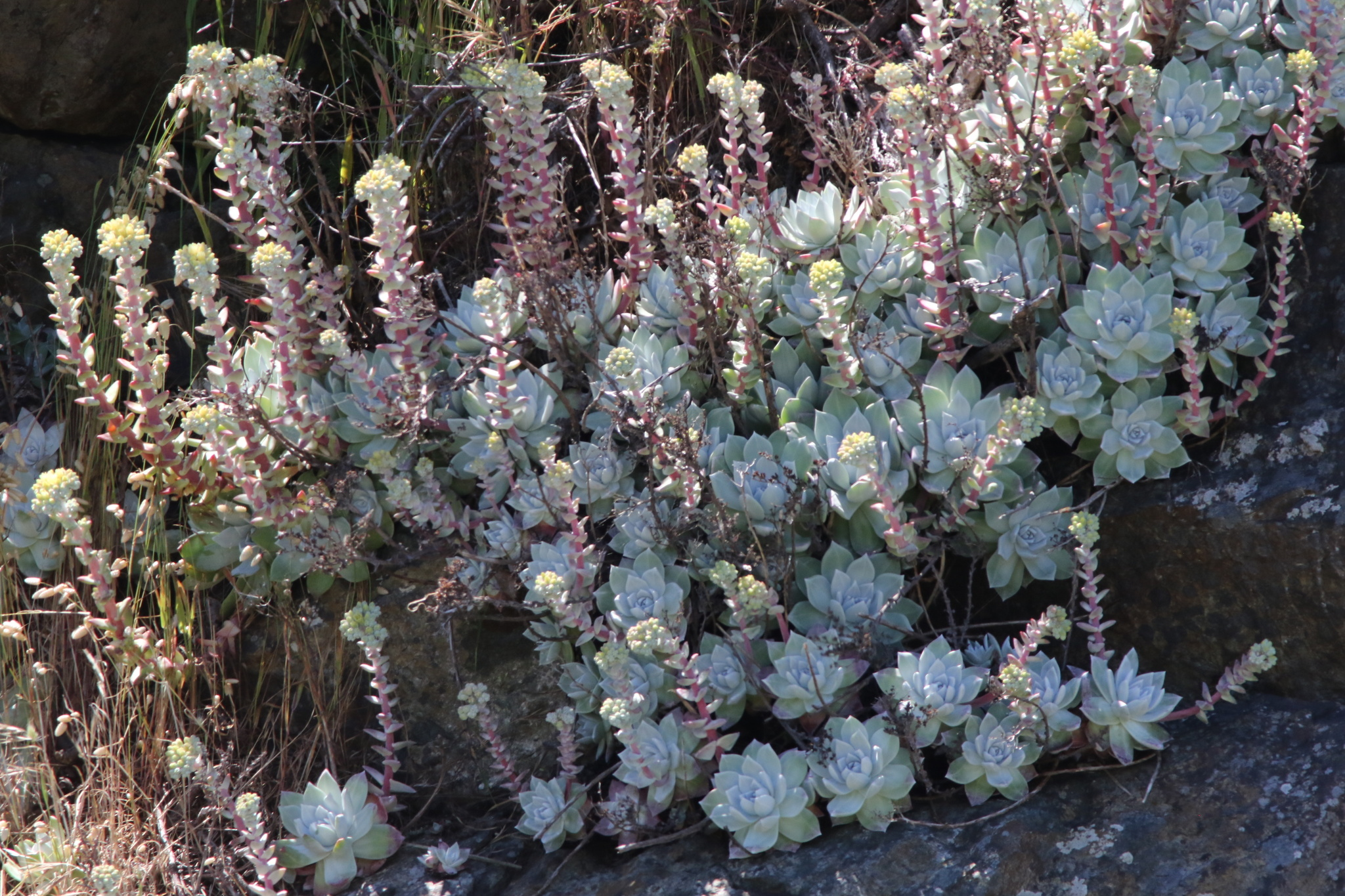
Crescent City, Del Norte County.

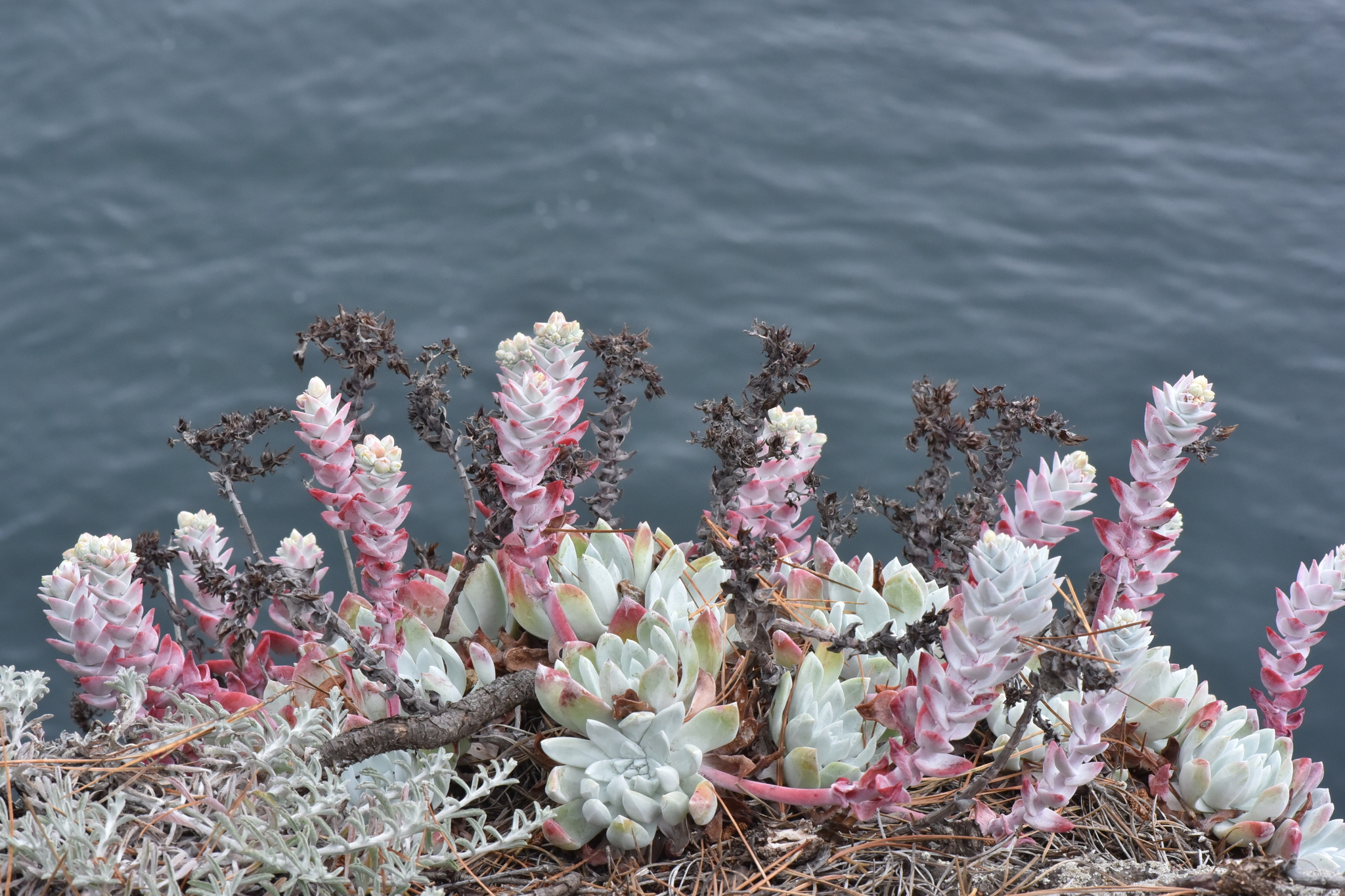
Point Lobos, Monterey County.

Moran noted that the plants of Monterey County and the plants of Del Norte County and northward were very similar, while in the intermediate coast, D. farinosa is somewhat different and in some respects approaches D. cymosa and D. caespitosa.

At the type locality on the Monterey Peninsula, this species is well-separated from its sympatric relative, Dudleya caespitosa, by morphological features and ploidy, with D. farinosa a diploid, while D. caespitosa is a variable polyploid. North of this area, in the San Francisco Bay, another diploid species, Dudleya cymosa subsp. cymosa, is found approaching the coast, and in several locations D. farinosa and D. cymosa are presumed to hybridize. Further north past central Humboldt County, D. farinosa is once again the only diploid species.

Although well-separated from D. caespitosa at the type locality, in the area near Big Sur, particularly around Bixby Creek, D. caespitosa approaches D. farinosa. In the intermediate stretch of coast between Monterey County and Del Norte County, D. farinosa also approaches D. caespitosa in some respects. The two species presumably hybridize.

== Distribution ==
=== Distribution ===
D. farinosa on Ring Mountain in Marin County.

Dudleya farinosa is native to the coast of northern and central California and southern Oregon in the United States. The species is distributed from Coos County, Oregon to Monterey County, California. The distribution is not contiguous, and it is absent from certain sections of coast. Gaps in the distribution include Santa Cruz County, where reports of D. farinosa are misidentifications of its similar relative Dudleya caespitosa. Because D. farinosa inhabits cliffs and coastal soils, it is mostly restricted to the immediate coast and is generally found no higher than 100 m (330 ft) in elevation, only reaching up to 300 m (980 ft) in San Mateo County. It is also found on adjacent offshore islets and islands within its distribution.

=== Habitat ===
==== California ====
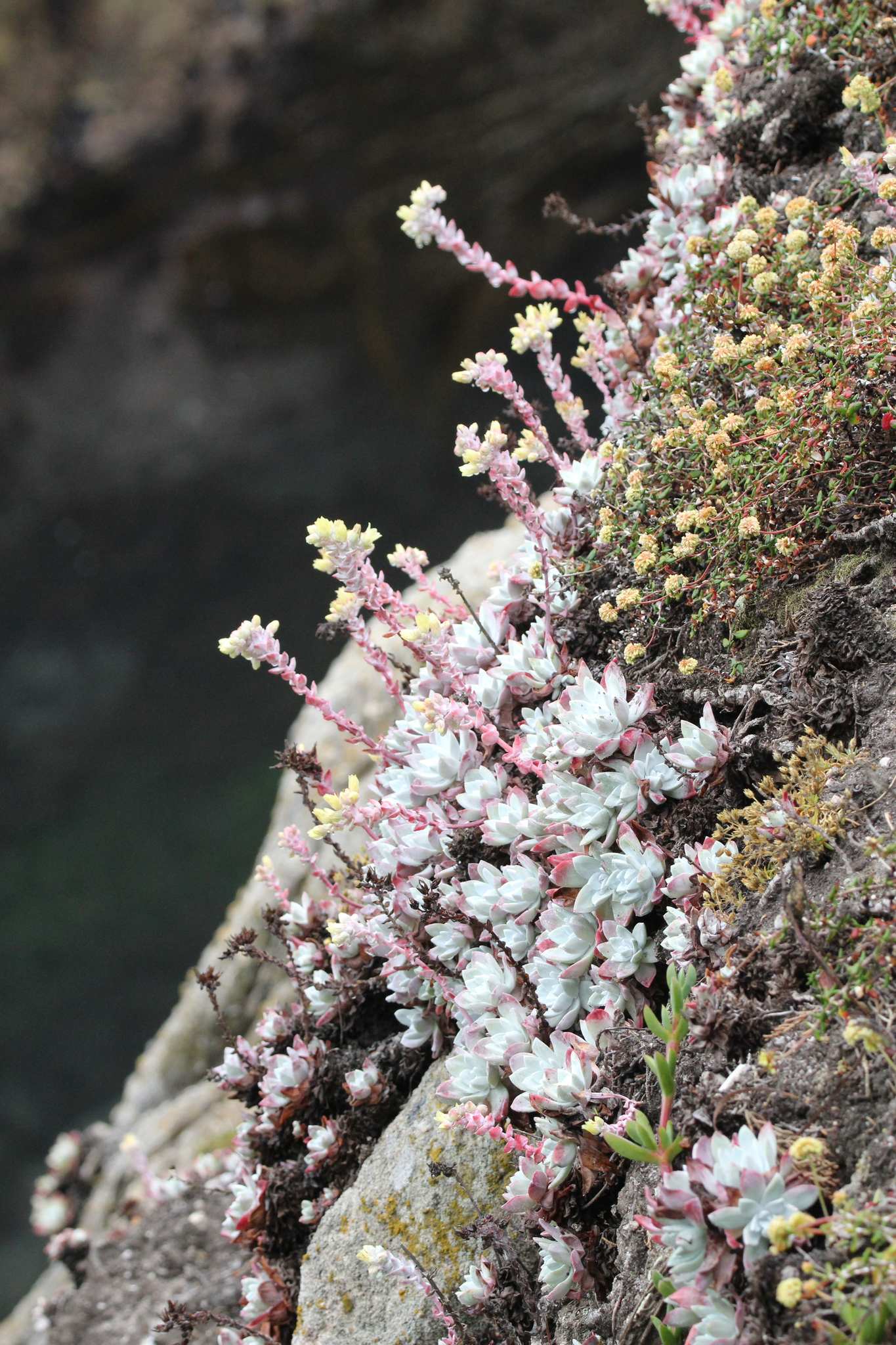
D. farinosa on the bluffs of Point Lobos, Monterey County.

In California, Dudleya farinosa forms a characteristic part of a coastal bluff plant community that ranges across the northern part of the state. This plant community is found on rocky, exposed coastal bluffs that receive constant winds with high salt content and have poor rocky soils. The scrub is usually low and prostrate, only about 5 to 50 cm (2.0 to 19.7 in) in height, and forms scattered patches and compact mats. Annuals and true shrubs are rare, and the community is dominated by herbaceous perennials and semi-woody subshrubs.

Prominent associates in this community include herbaceous perennials like Armeria maritima var. californica, Erigeron glaucus, Angelica hendersonii, and Polypodium scouleri and semi-woody subshrubs such as Eriogonum latifolium, Eriophyllum staechadifolium, Grindelia stricta ssp. venulosa, and Castilleja species.

Examples of this community include Castle Rock, an island on the outer coast of Del Norte County, which has Dudleya farinosa growing in rocky areas with Erigeron glaucus and Polypodium scouleri. Another example is Point Arena in Mendocino County, which has typical coastal bluff scrub including D. farinosa, Erigeron glaucus and Eriophyllum staechadifolium.

At Point Reyes National Seashore, Dudleya farinosa characterizes a unique plant community dominated by the prostrate form of Baccharis pilularis. This association is only known from Point Reyes and is found on bluffs and sand dunes immediately adjacent to the ocean on southeast- to southwest-facing slopes.

Dudleya farinosa experiences a distribution gap between San Mateo and Monterey counties (It is absent from Santa Cruz County), reappearing on the Monterey Peninsula south to Big Sur. On the Monterey Peninsula and Point Lobos, the coastal bluff scrub plant community is again present, and D. farinosa can be found growing with Hesperocyparis macrocarpa and Pinus radiata.

==== Oregon ====
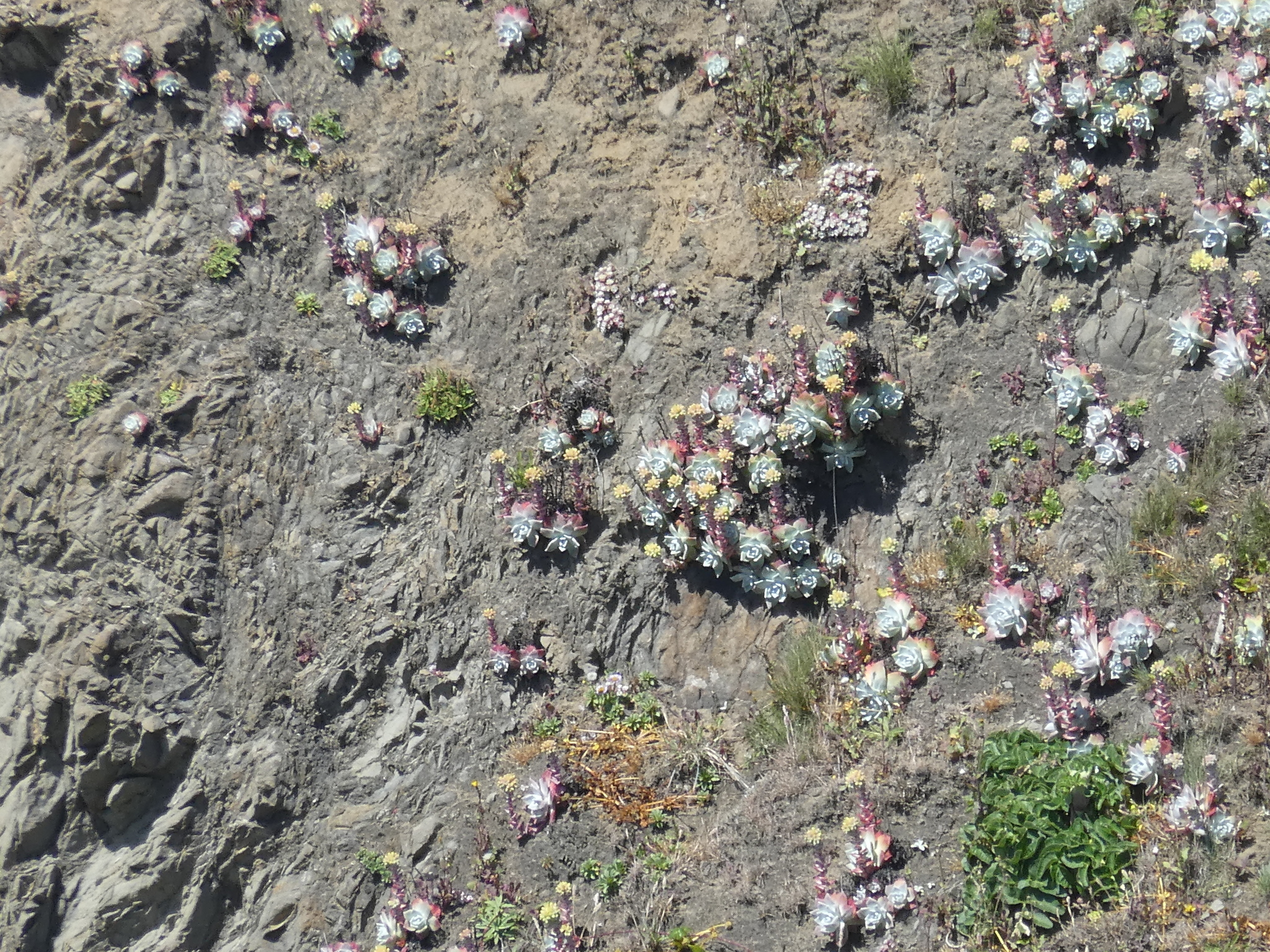
D. farinosa on an offshore rock, near Bandon, Coos County.

In Oregon, Dudleya farinosa is associated with the southern coastal plant community that ranges from the mouth of the Coquille River to the California border in a narrow coastal strip. It is found on exposed seaward slopes that are mostly devoid of tall vegetation, such as rocky bluffs, islets, and islands.

Habitats where D. farinosa have been recorded include the Oregon Islands National Wildlife Refuge in Bandon, where it is found growing on the east sides of several islands in association with Poa unilateralis, Armeria maritima, Sedum spathulifolium, Spergularia rubra, Fragaria chiloensis and Erigeron glaucus. At Cape Blanco, where extreme winds shape the coastal vegetation, patches of D. farinosa and Sedum spathulifolium are found at the harsh end of the promontory on isolated rocky crags in locations too steep, hard, and exposed for regular plants.

== Threats ==
Native plants are being dug up illegally in huge numbers, originally thought to satisfy demand as house plants in South Korea and China. Recent investigations show the demand may come from a smaller community of highly skilled succulent collectors and enthusiasts.
