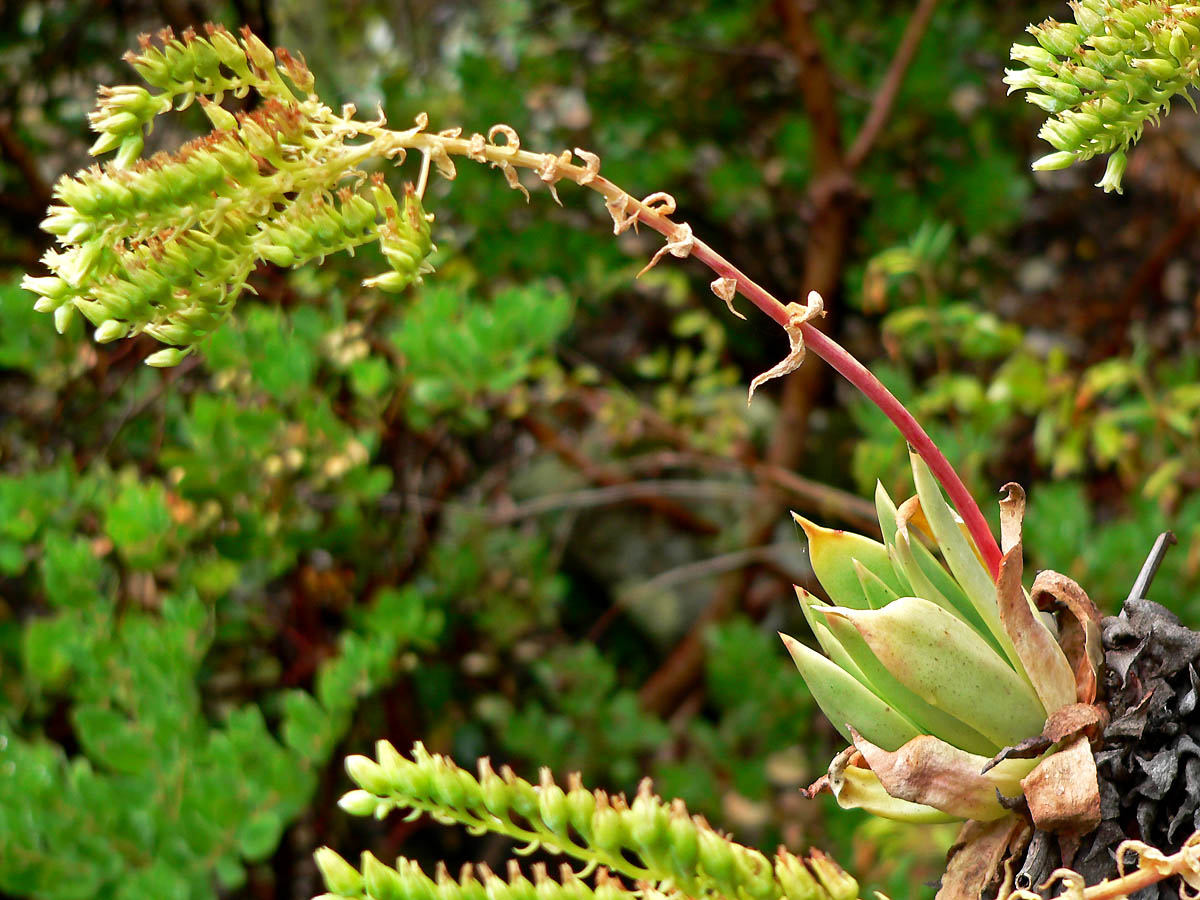

Scientific classification
- Kingdom: Plantae
- Clade: Tracheophytes
- Clade: Angiosperms
- Clade: Eudicots
- Order: Saxifragales
- Family: Crassulaceae
- Genus: Dudleya
- Species: D. candelabrum

Binomial name
- Dudleya candelabrum Rose

Synonyms
- Cotyledon candelabrum Fedde; Echeveria candelabrum Berger

= Dudleya candelabrum =

Species of succulent plant from the U.S.

Dudleya candelabrum is a species of succulent plant known by the common names candleholder liveforever or candleholder dudleya. Endemic to California, this species grows wild only on the northern Channel Islands, where it is found in open rocky places and north-facing slopes. It is characterized by thin, spade-shaped green leaves and an inflorescence covered in long, reflexed bracts, with pale yellow flowers. It has been threatened by poachers shipping plants to South Korea.

== Description ==
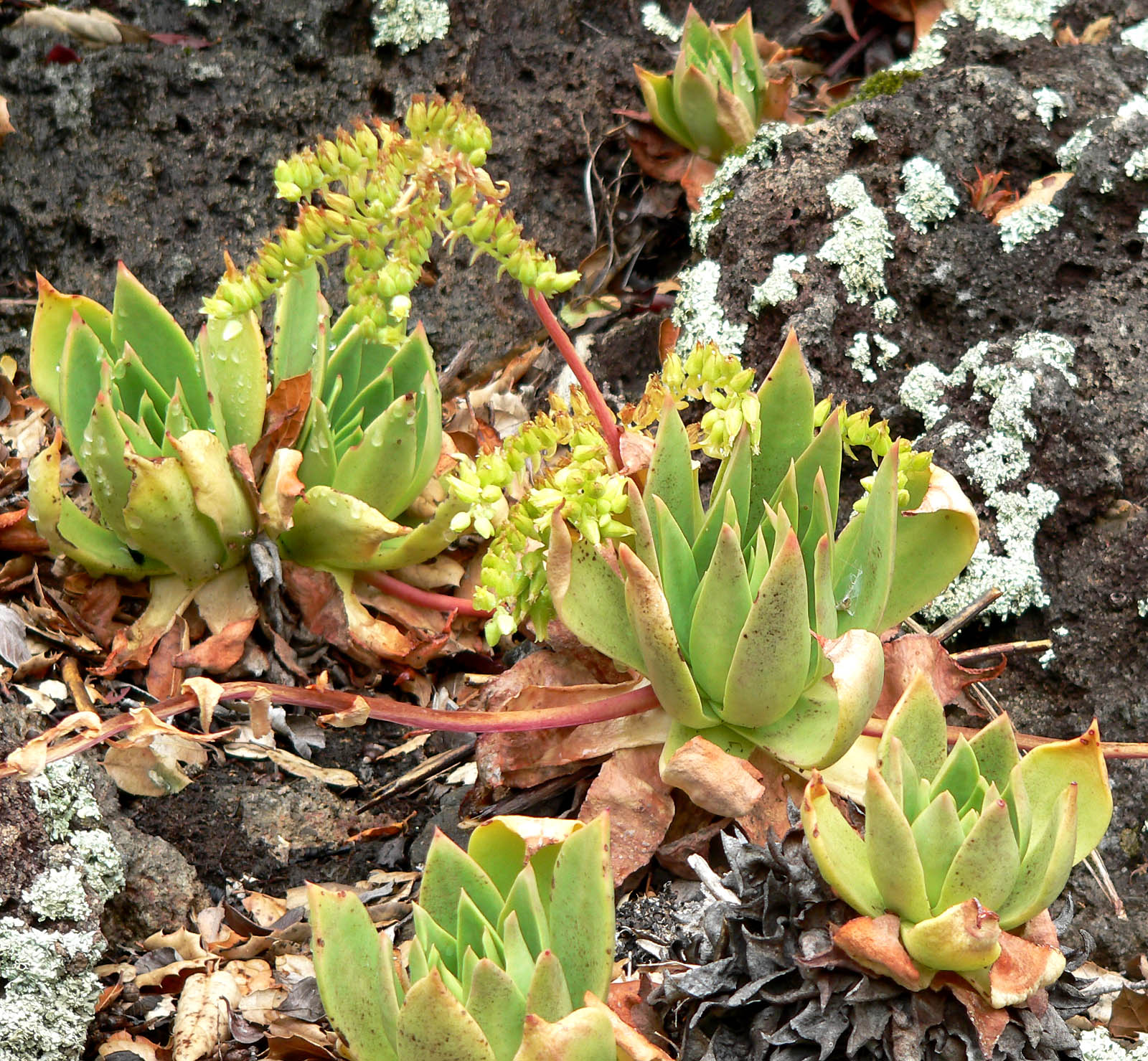
At the Regional Parks Botanic Garden.

This species typically grows from an often solitary basal rosette up to half a meter wide atop a thick, hardy caudex that is swollen at the base. There are 20 to 45 evergreen leaves on the rosette. The leaves are a pale green to pinkish-green, shaped obovate to oblong-oblanceolate, and more or less thin. The leaves may be glaucous, and when torn from the rosette, leave a purple-red wound. Each leaf measures anywhere from 6–22 cm (2.4–8.7 in) long by 3–7 cm (1.2–2.8 in) wide, with an acuminate tip.

The unbranched peduncle is generally erect but often bending under the weight of the inflorescence it holds. The peduncle is usually 15–54 cm (5.9–21.3 in) tall while only 6–11 mm (0.24–0.43 in) wide. The bracts are long and reflexed, bending backwards. The lowermost bracts are 1–4 cm (0.39–1.57 in) long. The inflorescence first branches 3 to 7 times, and then those branch another 1 to 2 times. The terminal branches are 2.5–13 cm (0.98–5.12 in) and hold up to 25 flowers. The flower has pale-yellow petals 8–12 mm (0.31–0.47 in) long within its pink-tinged green sepals.

Flowering is from May to July. Chromosome number is 17.

== Taxonomy ==
=== Taxonomic history ===
The type specimen was collected by Professor E. L. Greene on Santa Cruz Island, in July and August 1886. The species was described in 1903 with Nathaniel Lord Britton and Joseph Nelson Rose's taxonomic revision of North American Crassulaceae, as part of the creation of the genus Dudleya. Later, German botanists such as Fedde in 1904 and Berger in 1930 would classify it as Cotyledon candelabrum and Echeveria candelabrum respectively, but these redefinitions were outdated after Reid Moran's revision of the genus, along with later phylogenetic work that showed Dudleya as being more closely related to Sedum than to Echeveria.

=== Characteristics ===
Reid Moran noted the resemblance of the plant to the green form of Dudleya brittonii. Phylogenetic analysis has shown that it is instead related to Dudleya acuminata, a geographically distant plant that shares the trait of shiny green leaves.

Despite the characteristic green leaves, however, some individuals may instead have white, glaucous leaves, which makes them difficult to distinguish from the polymorphic Dudleya greenei. The two may be keyed by the fact that D. candelabrum is found in steep, inland to coastal canyons, on often north-facing or shaded cliffs, or on deeper soils than D. greenei, and the fact that D. candelabrum has long, reflexed bracts.

== Distribution and habitat ==
Dudleya candelabrum is endemic to the Santa Cruz and Santa Rosa Islands. It occurs on rocky, north-facing slopes below 1,200 ft.

== Conservation ==
In 2020, social media posts indicated that numerous plants were poached from California and destined for South Korea.
