= Farina =

Farina may refer to:

== Places ==
- Farina, South Australia, a former town in outback South Australia
- Farina, Illinois, a village in the United States
- Farina railway station, a former railway station on the Central Australian Railway, South Australia

== People ==
- Farina (surname)
- Farina (singer), Colombian reggaeton singer
- Allen "Farina" Hoskins, American child actor in the Our Gang short films

=== Fictional characters ===
- Farina (Pearls Before Swine), a character in Pearls Before Swine
- Farina, a character in Fire Emblem

== Other uses ==
- Farina (food), a cereal meal
- Farina (novel), an 1857 novel by George Meredith
- Farina, a whitish or yellow powdery secretion that appears on leaves of Primula and some ferns. see: Epicuticular wax#Farina

== See also ==
- Farina gegenüber, a fragrance company in Cologne, Germany
- Stabilimenti Farina, an Italian coachbuilder
- Pininfarina (disambiguation)
- Farinha (disambiguation)
