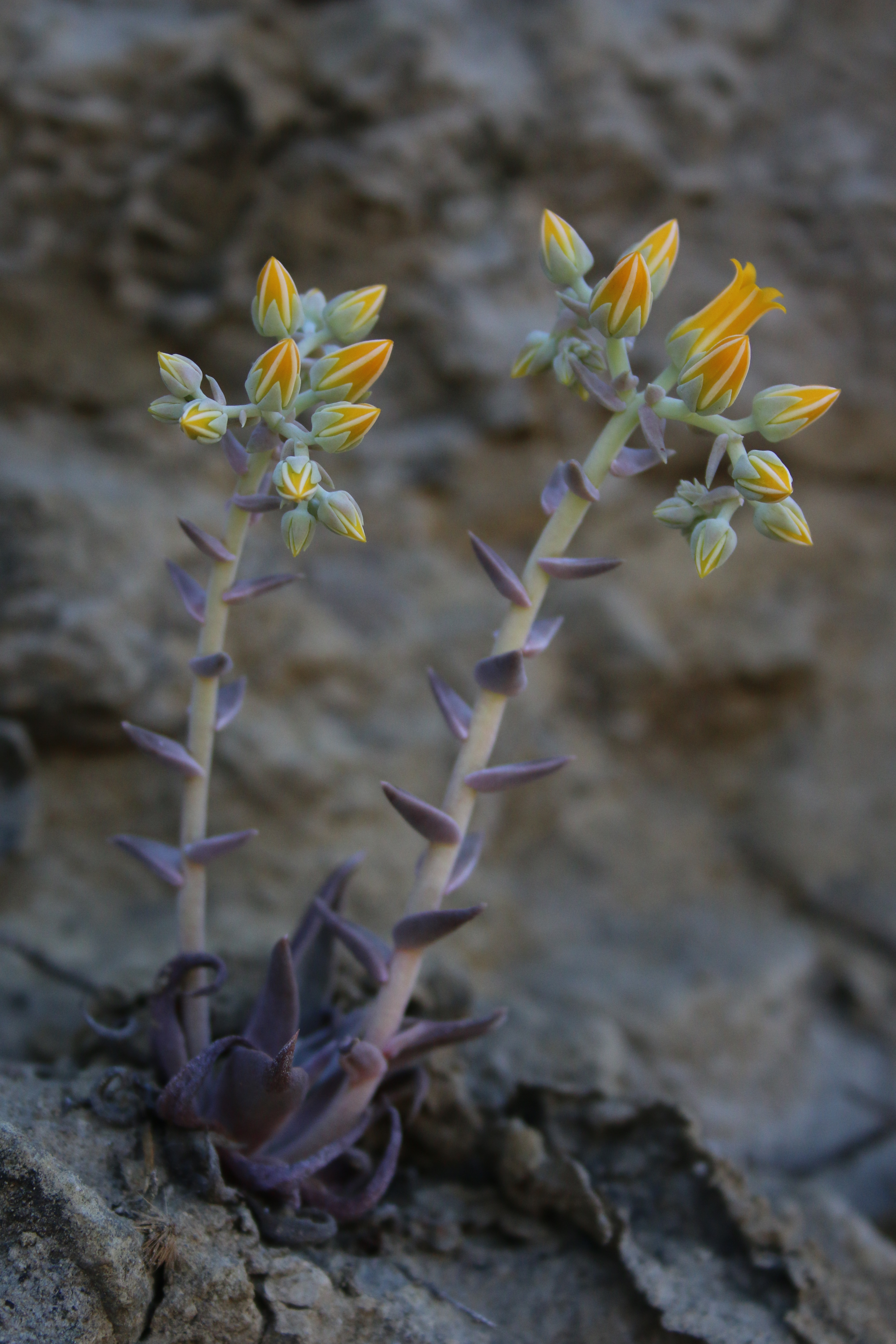

Conservation status
- Critically Imperiled (NatureServe)

Scientific classification
- Kingdom: Plantae
- Clade: Tracheophytes
- Clade: Angiosperms
- Clade: Eudicots
- Order: Saxifragales
- Family: Crassulaceae
- Genus: Dudleya
- Species: D. cymosa
- Subspecies: D. c. subsp. agourensis

Trinomial name
- Dudleya cymosa subsp. agourensis K.M.Nakai

Synonyms
- Dudleya agourensis (K.M.Nakai) P.H.Thomson

= Dudleya cymosa subsp. agourensis =

Subspecies of flowering plant

Dudleya cymosa subsp. agourensis, commonly known as the Agoura Hills dudleya or Agoura Hills liveforever, is a species of perennial succulent plant. A rare and critically imperiled species from the Santa Monica Mountains in California, it is characterized by glaucous, gray-purple leaves, bright yellow flowers, and ascending bracts. A leaf succulent, it is found growing on west to northwest-facing open, rocky volcanic slopes.

It was formerly considered to be a distinct race within Dudleya cymosa subsp. ovatifolia, until it was described in 1987 on the basis of numerous differences that distinguished it from that subspecies, namely the leaf morphology, the branching caudex, and the morphology of the flowers and inflorescences. Although subsp. ovatifolia was split, this species has inherited its listed status as threatened under the Endangered Species Act. It is primarily threatened by development, but also trampling, trails, invasive plants, and illegal dumping.

== Description ==
This species grows in a caespitose habit, with 1 to 6 or more rosettes on a branching stem. The rosettes are 5–10 cm (2.0–3.9 in) wide. The stems are 1–2 cm (0.39–0.79 in) wide. The 6 to 10 leaves on the rosette are oblong to lanceolate-shaped. The leaf surfaces are often glaucous but not farinose, and are colored a purple-gray to blue-gray. The leaves measure 3–10 cm (1.2–3.9 in) long by 1–1.5 cm (0.39–0.59 in) wide, and have an acute to acuminate tip. When dry, the leaves may become twisted.

The inflorescence is more or less asymmetric radially when it branches. The erect peduncle is 6–17 cm (2.4–6.7 in) tall by 2–3 mm (0.079–0.118 in) wide, and tinged with red. Lining the peduncle are lanceolate bracts, which are 1–2.5 cm (0.39–0.98 in) long by 7–10 mm (0.28–0.39 in) and with acute to acuminate tips. The lower bracts are ascending. The inflorescence is composed of 2 to 3 simple to bifurcate branches, with their terminal branches ascending. The terminal branches are 1–3 cm (0.39–1.18 in) long with 3 to 8 flowers. The lowermost pedicels suspending the flowers are 6–12 mm (0.24–0.47 in) long.

The tips of the flower buds are angled greater than 50°. The flower petals are a bright yellow, and occasionally glaucous along their midrib. The apices of the petals are spreading 45° to 90°. The petals measure 10–12 mm (0.39–0.47 in) long by 3–4.5 mm (0.12–0.18 in) wide.

Flowering is from May to June. Chromosome count is n = 17 ( 2n = 34).

== Distribution and habitat ==
Dudleya cymosa subsp. agourensis is endemic to California in the United States, occurring in the Santa Monica Mountains of the Transverse Ranges. It is found in Ventura County and Los Angeles County. All occurrences of this species are found in a 2 mi (3.2 km) by 6 mi (9.7 km) band along the north-facing side of the western Santa Monica Mountains, between Thousand Oaks and Agoura Hills.

This species is primarily found on open, rocky volcanic slopes, typically facing west to northwest. It is also found along road embankments. Although rare, it can be locally abundant where found. It occurs in a drier, more exposed habitat than Dudleya cymosa subsp. ovatifolia.

== Gallery ==
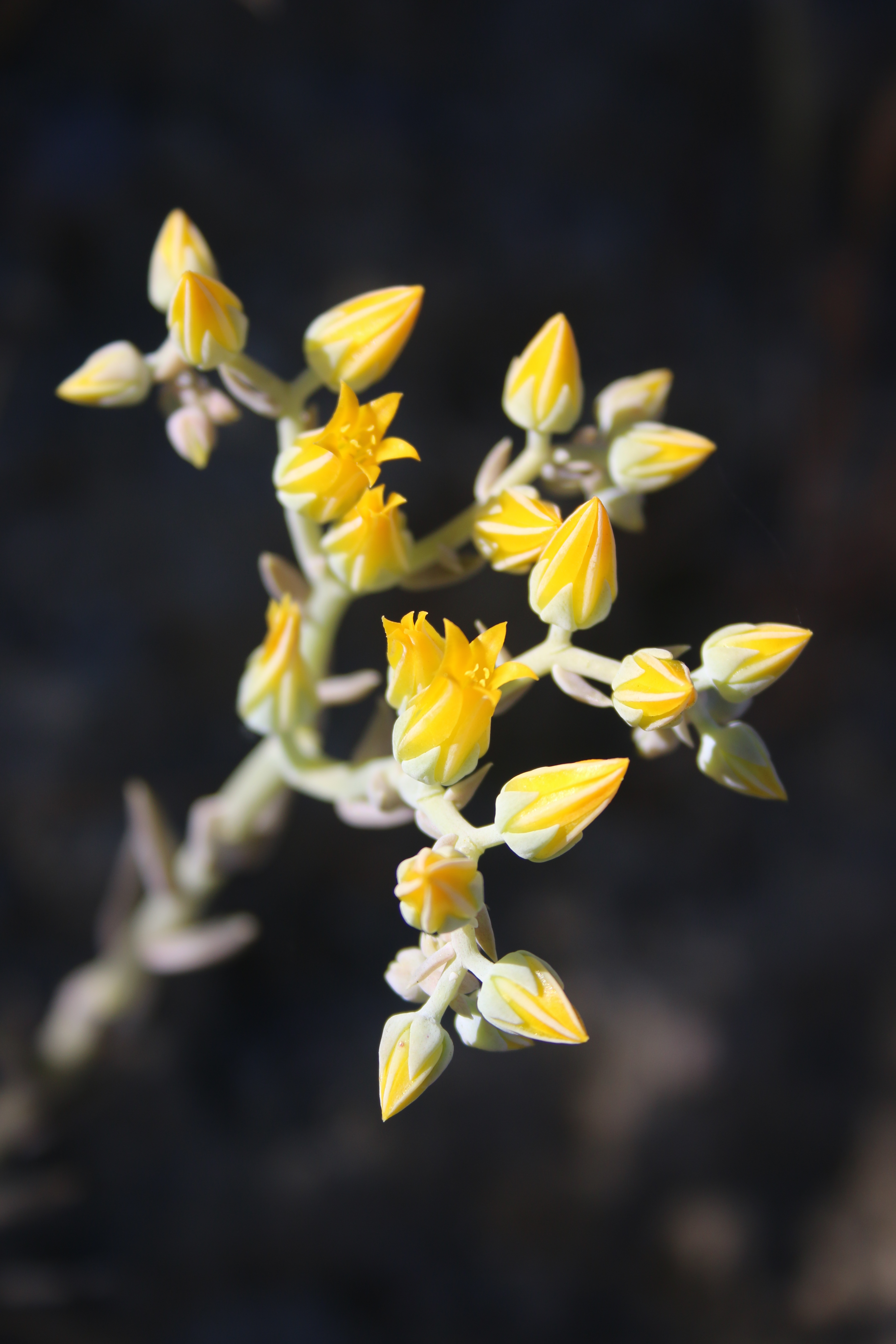
The flowers

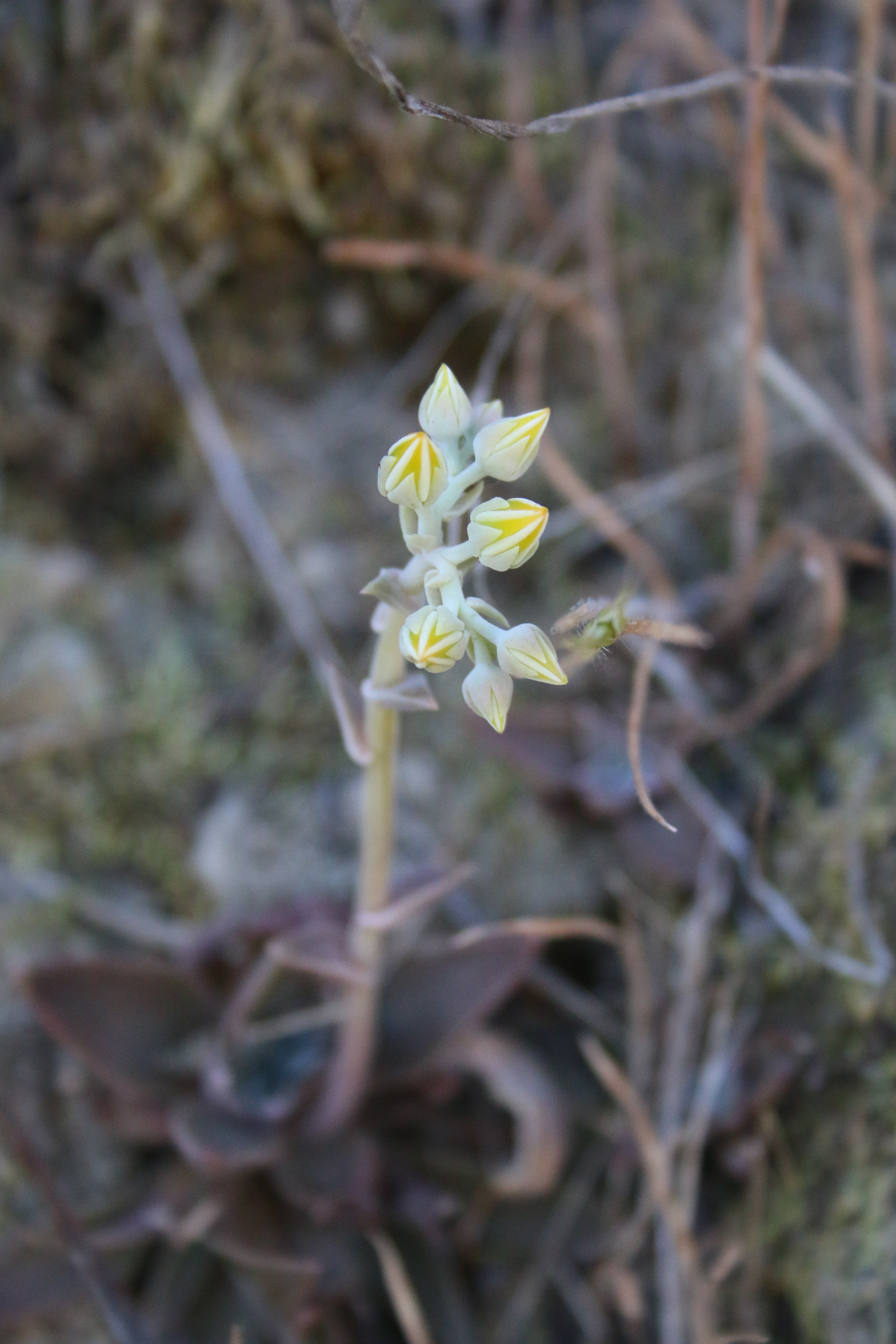
Getting ready to bloom in habitat

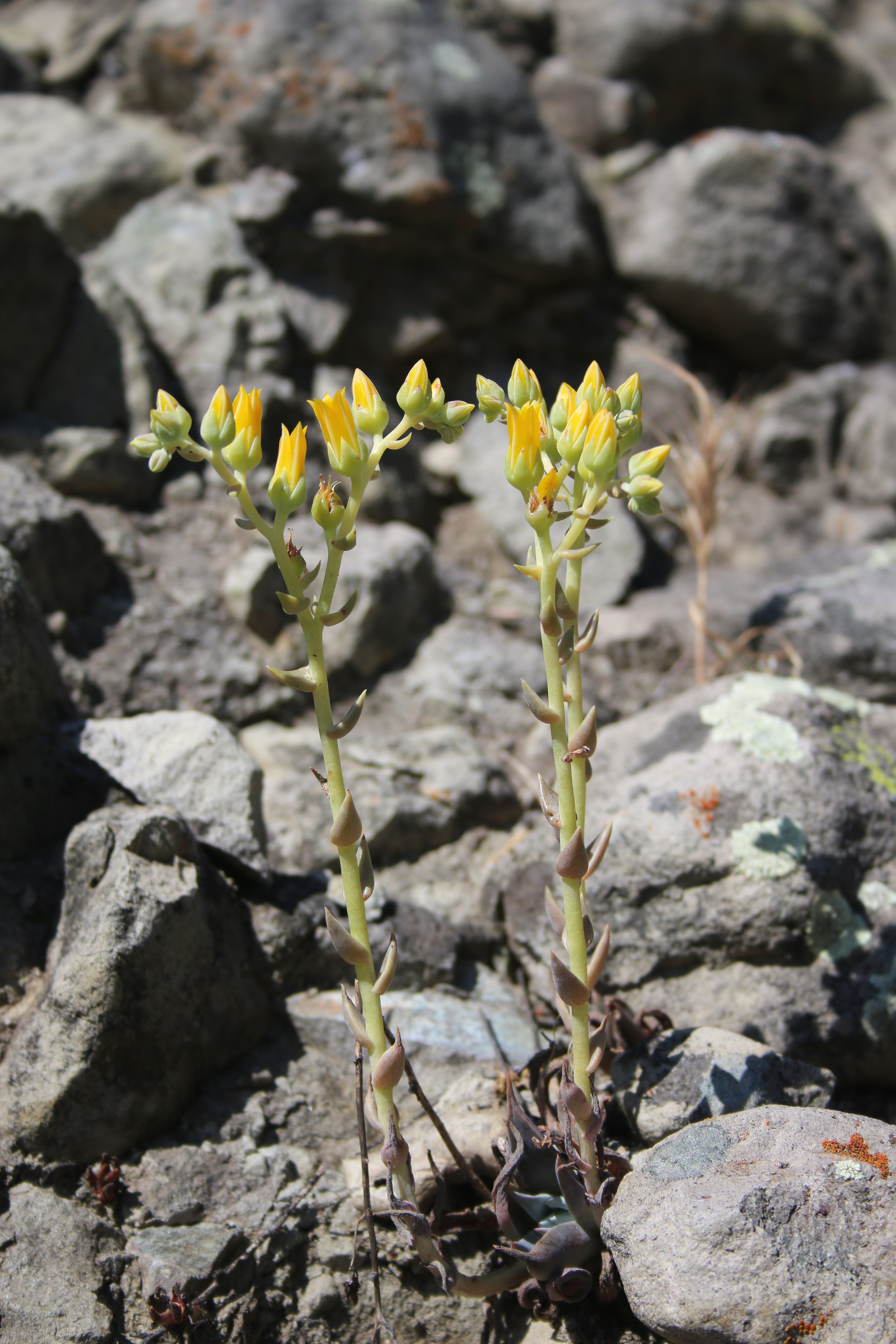
Flowering in habitat

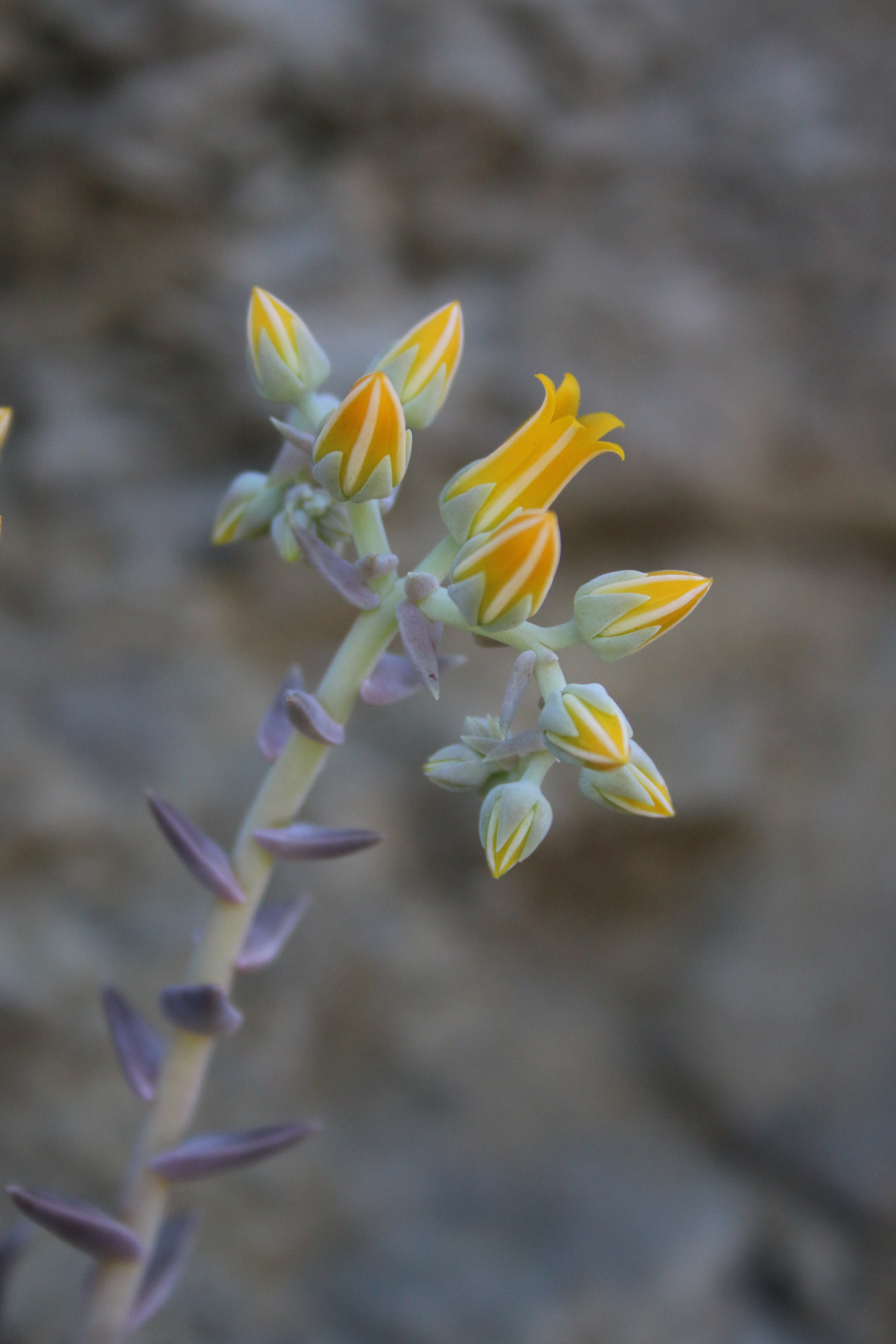
Detail of the inflorescence

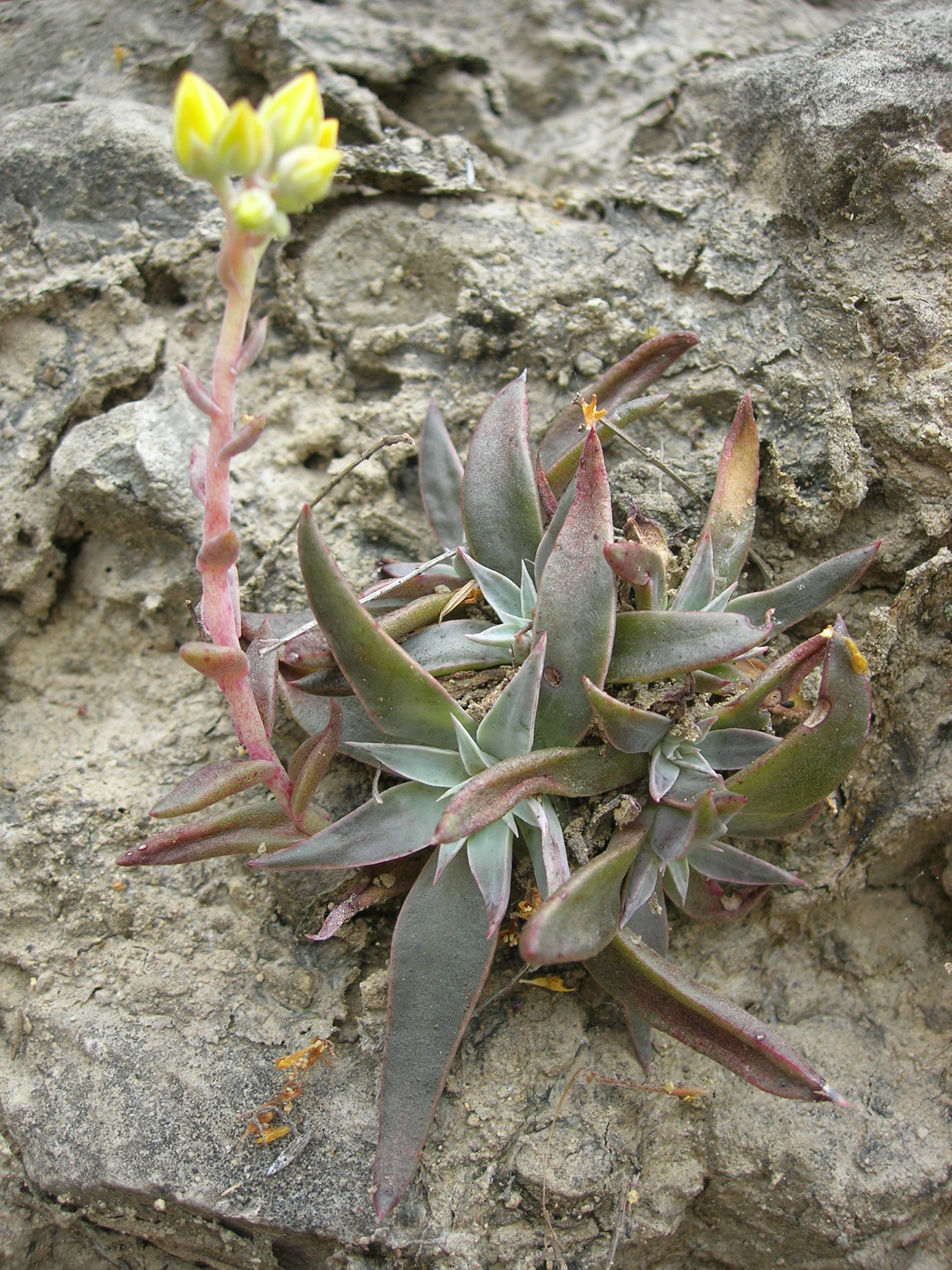
The plant with developing inflorescence
