= Farina (surname) =

Farina or Fariña is a surname, meaning flour in several Romance languages. Notable people with the surname include:

== Arts and entertainment ==
- Amy Farina, American musician
- Antonio Farina (fl. 1670s) Italian composer
- Battista "Pinin" Farina (later Battista Pininfarina), Italian automobile stylist
- Carlo Farina, Italian composer and violinist of the Baroque era
- Carolyn Farina, American actress
- Dennis Farina (1944–2013), American actor
- Mark Farina, American house music DJ and producer
- Mimi Baez Fariña, folk music performer
- Piergiorgio Farina (1933–2008), Italian jazz violinist
- Richard Fariña, American author and folk music performer
- Salvatore Farina (disambiguation)
- Santo and Johnny Farina, an American rock 'n' roll duo
- Sergio Farina (later Sergio Pininfarina), Italian car designer, son of Battista Farina
- William Farina, American essayist and author
- Farina brothers, wealthy Neapolitan lawyers who may have sponsored the castrato Carlo Broschi, whose stage-name “Farinelli” may be a homage to them

== Politics ==
- Adele Farina, Australian politician
- Giuseppe La Farina, leader of the Italian Risorgimento

== Religion ==
- Giovanni Antonio Farina, Italian bishop
- Pietro Farina (1942–2013), Italian Roman Catholic bishop
- Raffaele Farina, Italian cardinal of the Roman Catholic Church

== Sport ==
- Frank Farina, Australian football player and former manager of the Socceroos
- Gianluca Farina, Italian competition rower and Olympic champion
- Giuseppe Farina, Italian Grand Prix racer and the first Formula One World Drivers Champion
- Robin Farina (born 1977), American cyclist
- Simone Farina, Italian footballer
- Stefano Farina, Italian football referee

== Other fields ==
- Johann Maria Farina (1685–1766), the creator of Eau de Cologne
- Leonardo Fariña, Argentinian accused of involvement in a money laundering scandal

== See also ==
- The dictionary definition of Farina at Wiktionary
- The dictionary definition of Fariña at Wiktionary
- Pininfarina (disambiguation)
