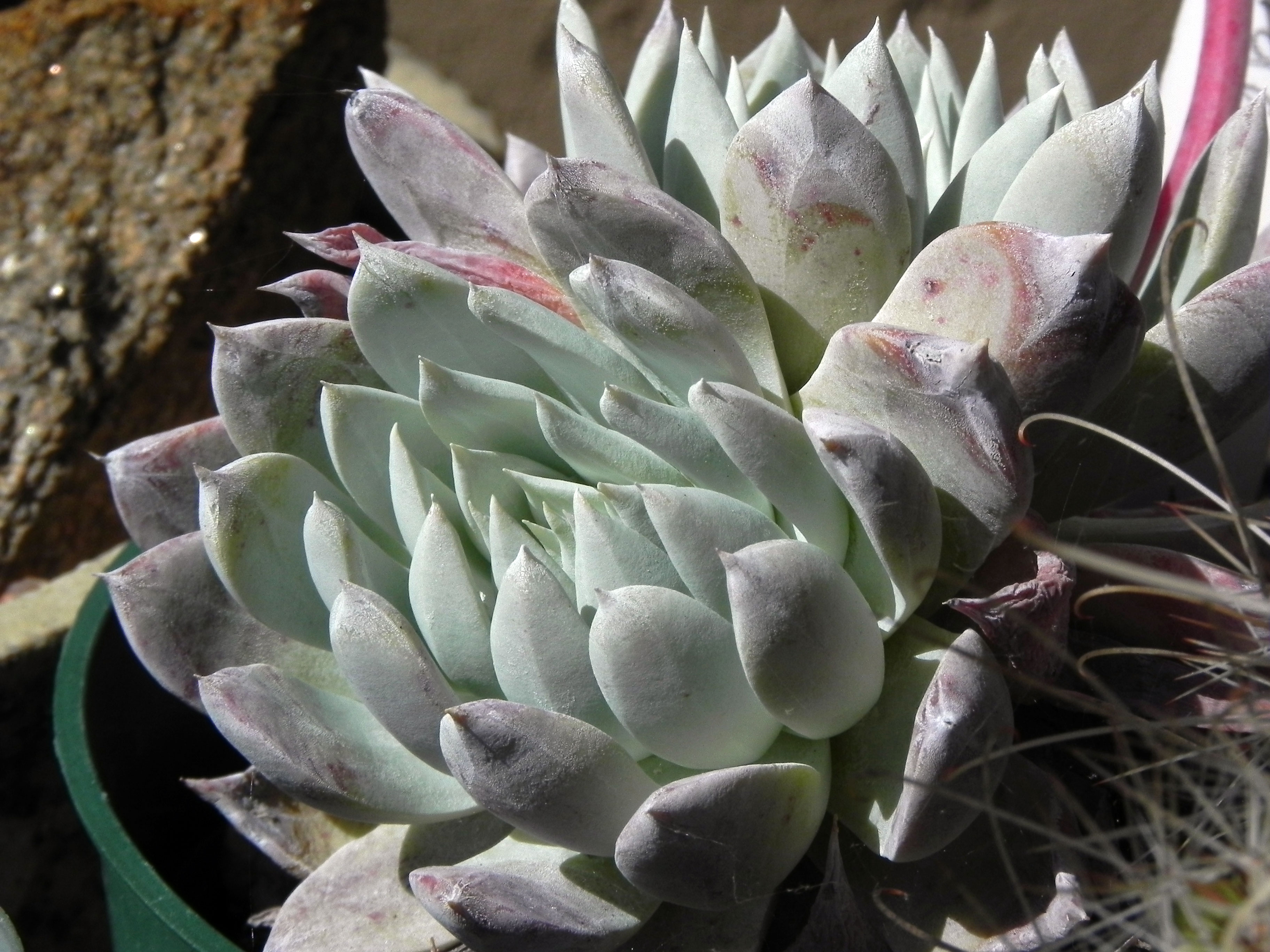
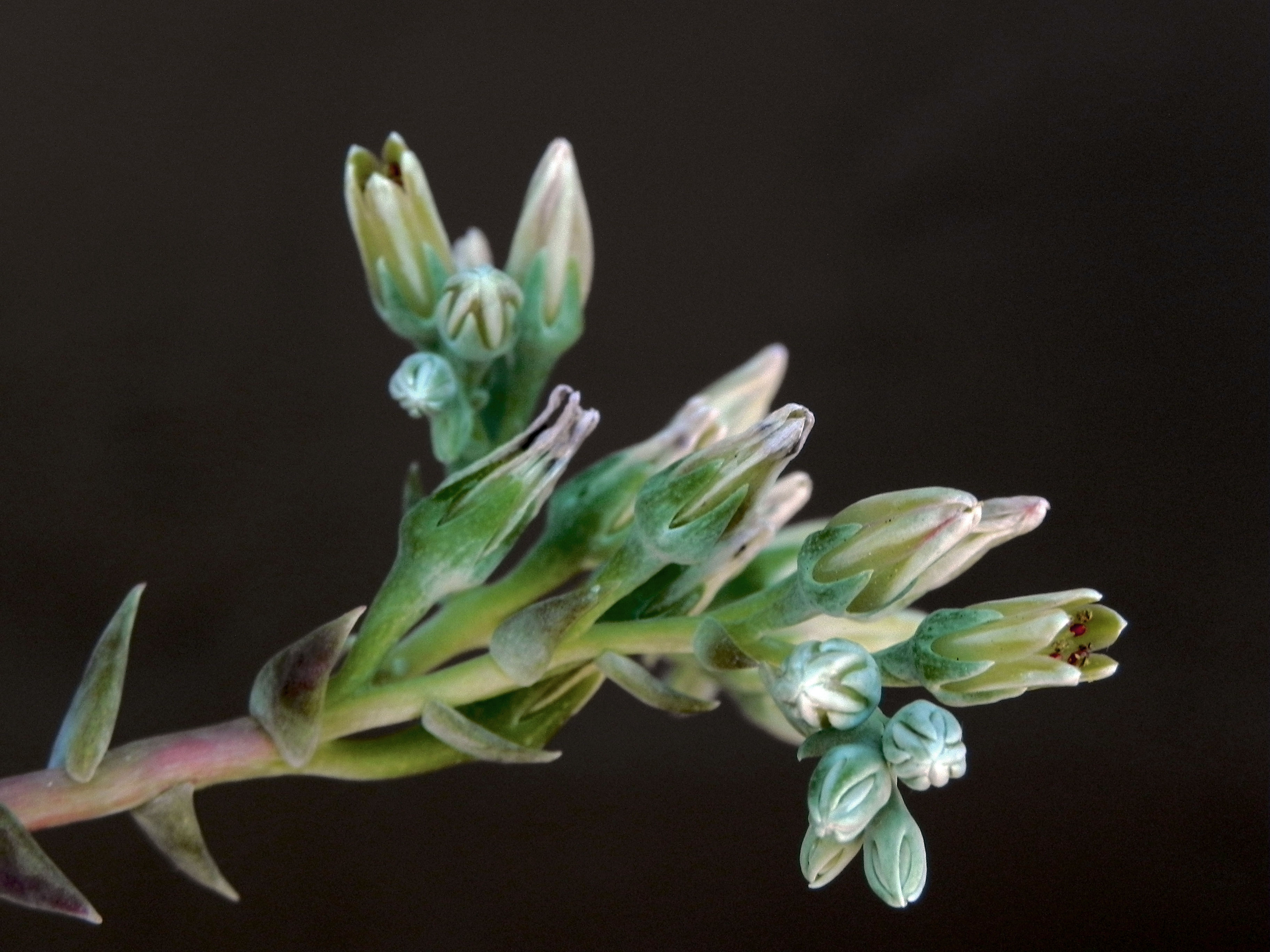
- Rosettes (top) and flowers (bottom)

Scientific classification
- Kingdom: Plantae
- Clade: Tracheophytes
- Clade: Angiosperms
- Clade: Eudicots
- Order: Saxifragales
- Family: Crassulaceae
- Genus: Dudleya
- Species: D. candida

Binomial name
- Dudleya candida Britton & Rose
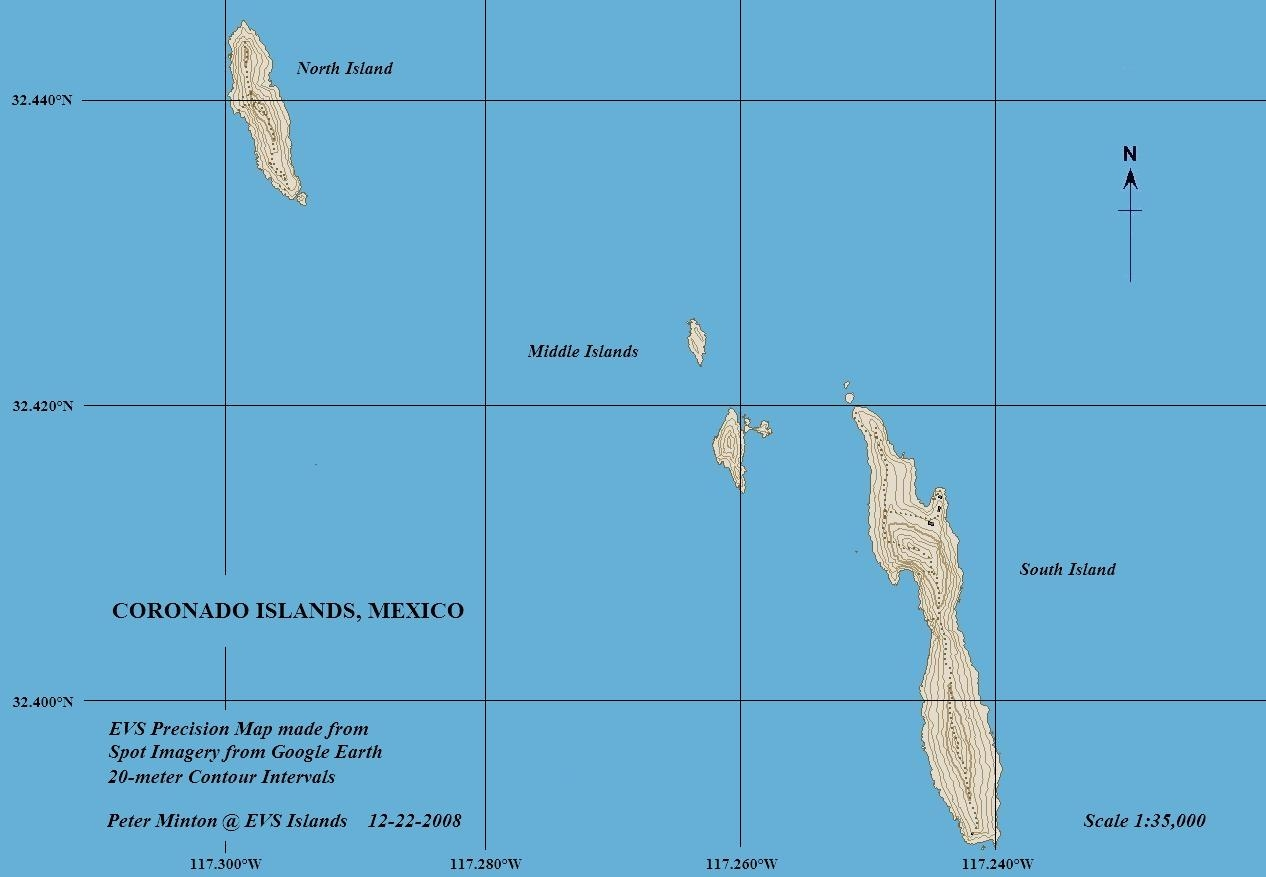
- Map of the Coronado Islands, where D. candida is endemic.

Synonyms
- Synonymy: Cotyledon bryceae (Britton & Rose) Fedde; Cotyledon candida (Britton & Rose) Fedde; Dudleya bryceae Britton & Rose; Echeveria bryceae (Britton & Rose) A.Berger; Echeveria candida (Britton & Rose) A.Berger

= Dudleya candida =

Succulent plant from Mexican islands in the Pacific

Dudleya candida is a species of perennial succulent plant in the family Crassulaceae known by the common names Coronados liveforever or chalk rose. It is a rosette-forming, green to white-colored leaf succulent, and in bloom yellow flowers atop red stalks stand above the foliage. It has some visual similarities to the mainland Dudleya brittonii, and has found uses in horticulture as an ornamental plant. It is restricted to the Coronado Islands, an island group off of the extreme northern Baja California coast, visible from the United States.

== Description ==
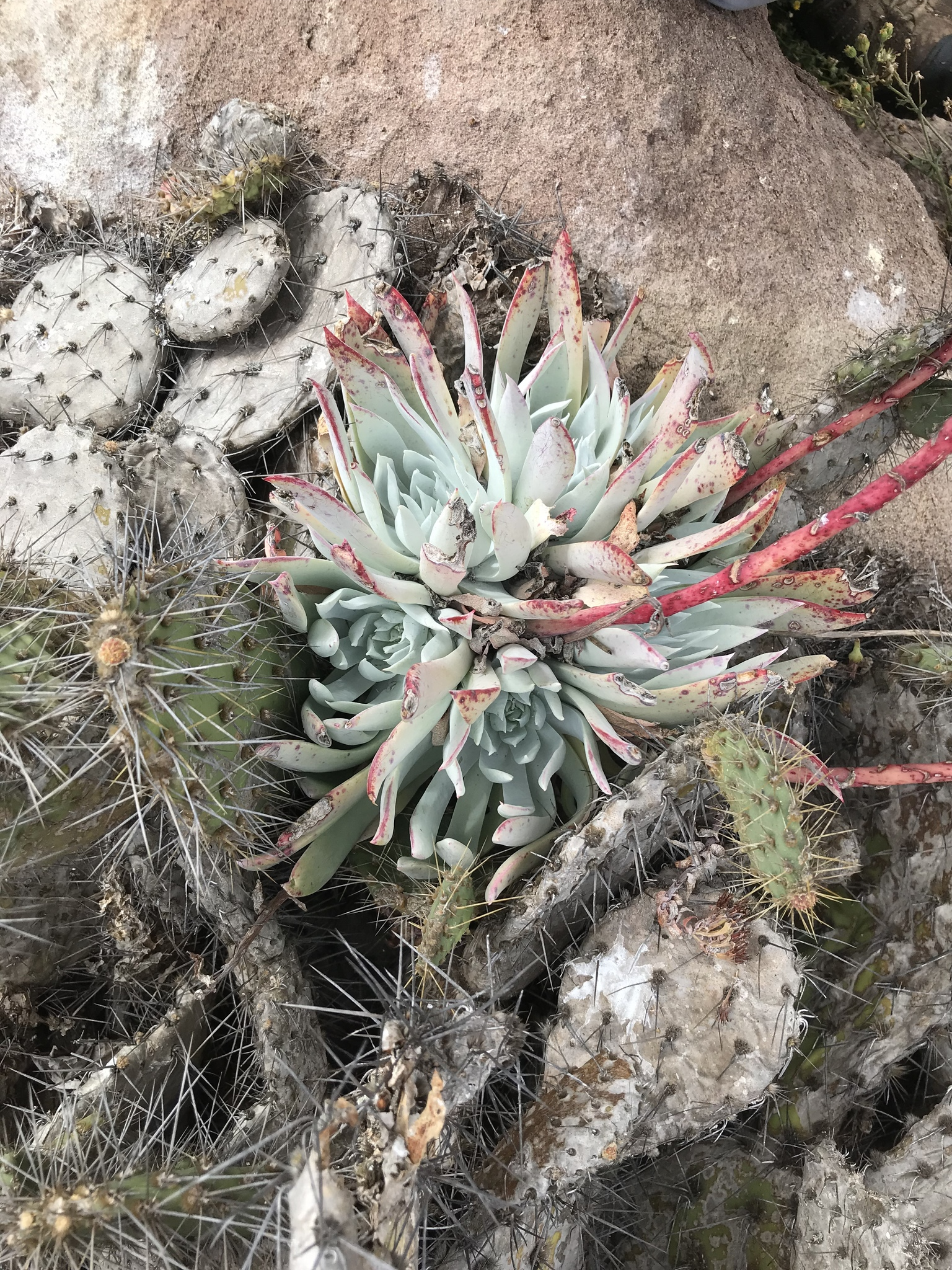
Growing with Opuntia species in habitat

Beginning from the bottom, the caudex is 2.5 cm (1 in) to 5 cm (2 in) thick, and quickly branches into rounded mounds over (2 ft) in diameter, containing sometimes over 200 rosettes that are 7.6 cm (3 in) to 17 cm (7 in) in diameter. The foliage consists of 30 to 60 white, pulverulent leaves, that may have pink or reddish tips. The leaves are often widest at the base, 5 cm (2 in) to 10 cm (4 in) long, 1.2 cm (0.5 in) to 2.5 cm (1 in) wide, 3 mm (0.12 in) to 4.5 mm (0.18 in) thick.

The peduncle is pink, 20 cm (8 in) to 45 cm (18 in) tall, 6 mm (0.25 in) to 9.3 mm (0.37 in) thick, with 12 to 20 horizontal bracts. The bracts are 3 cm (1.25 in) long, 1.9 cm (0.75 in) wide, and 3 mm (0.12 in) thick, tapering to a sharp point. The inflorescence branches several times, but stays fairly compact. The upright flowers are a pale yellow, 1.5 cm (0.62 in) long, and up to 6 mm (0.25 in) wide, suspended on 6 mm (0.25 in) to 1.2 cm (0.5 in) long pedicels.

Dudleya candida flowers from May to early June.

The plant bears a resemblance to another nearby relative, Dudleya brittonii. The plants may be distinguished by the fact that D. candida has a much smaller rosette and smaller flower heads, and also that brittonii has flowering branchlets emerging from the axils of the upper bracts.

== Distribution and habitat ==
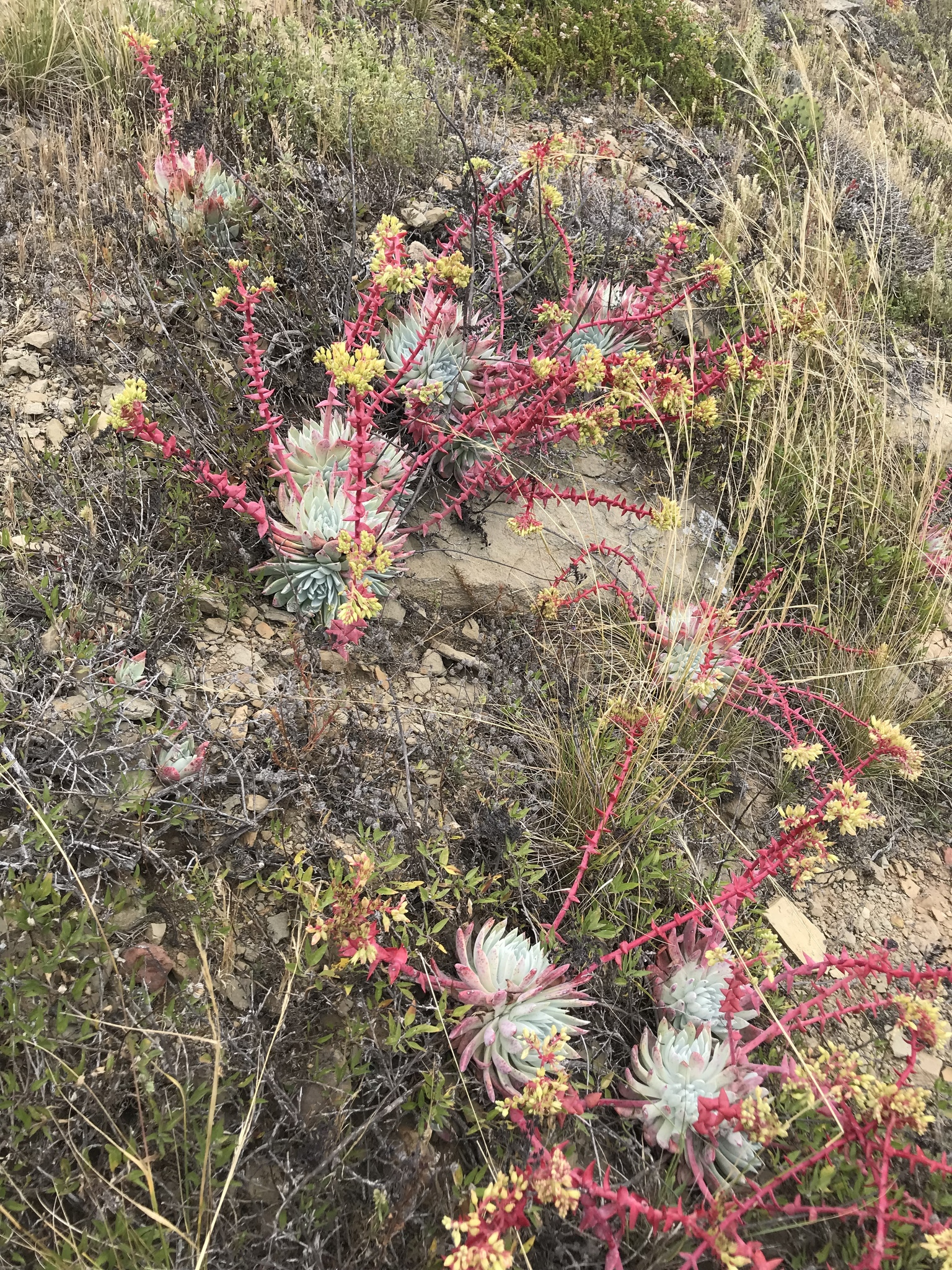
Many plants growing in habitat

Dudleya candida is only found the Coronado Islands, an island group off of the northwestern corner of Baja California. It occurs on North and South Island.

== Cultivation ==
In cultivation, Dudleya candida will grow quickly and multiply over many years. Specimens will likely overgrow their pots, but can last many years. It may or may not be watered during summer dormancy, surviving regardless. Overhead watering will remove the white farina on the leaves, making it green. Plants will also need regular water during the winter months, which is their growing period. As this species is native to the maritime Coronado Islands, they are not very tolerant of excessive heat or cold.

A narrow-leaved horticultural form exists, and is often encountered much more frequently than the normal form in the horticultural trade. The normal form is often mislabeled and rare to find.
