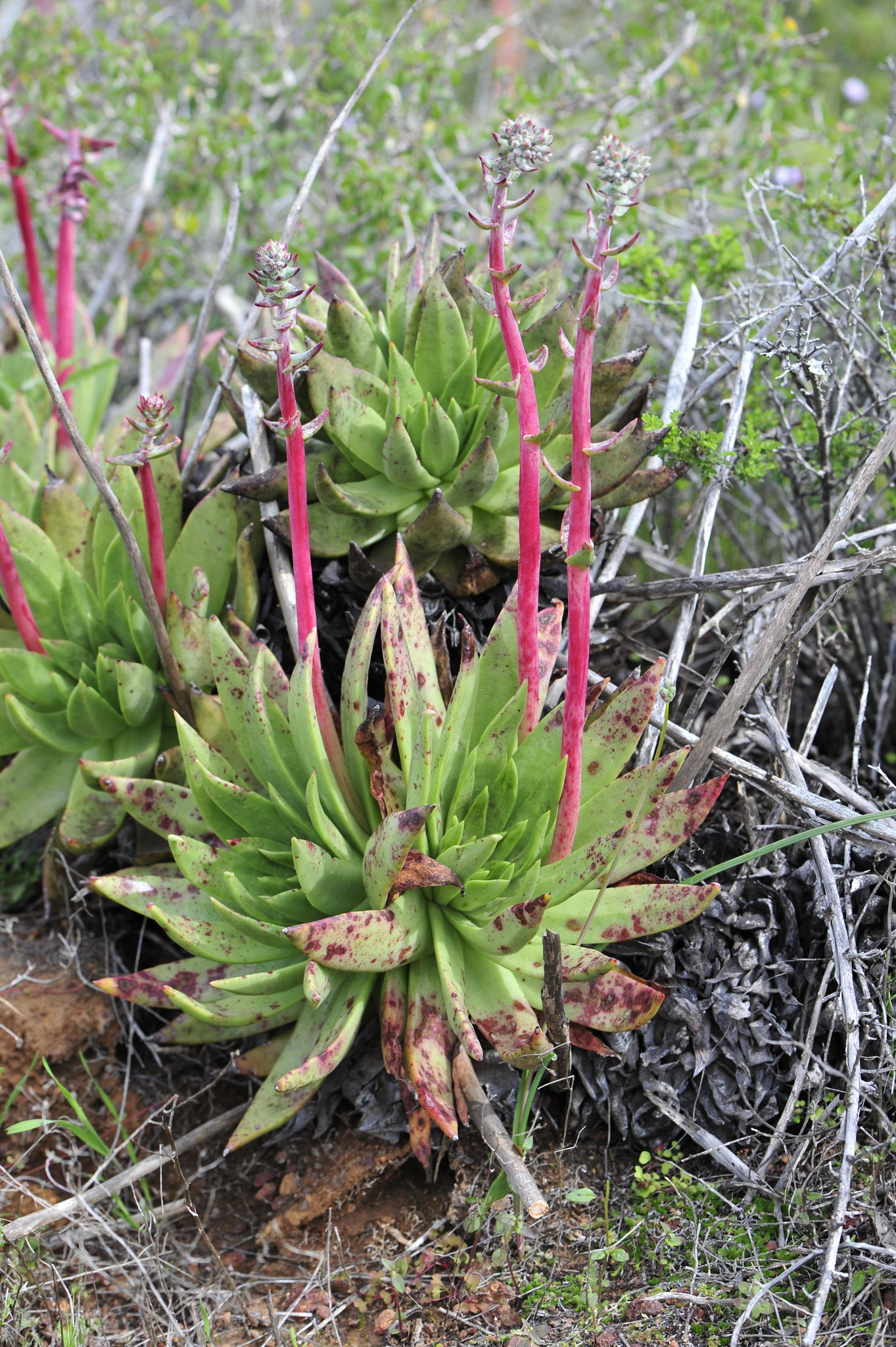

Scientific classification
- Kingdom: Plantae
- Clade: Tracheophytes
- Clade: Angiosperms
- Clade: Eudicots
- Order: Saxifragales
- Family: Crassulaceae
- Genus: Dudleya
- Species: D. ingens

Binomial name
- Dudleya ingens Rose
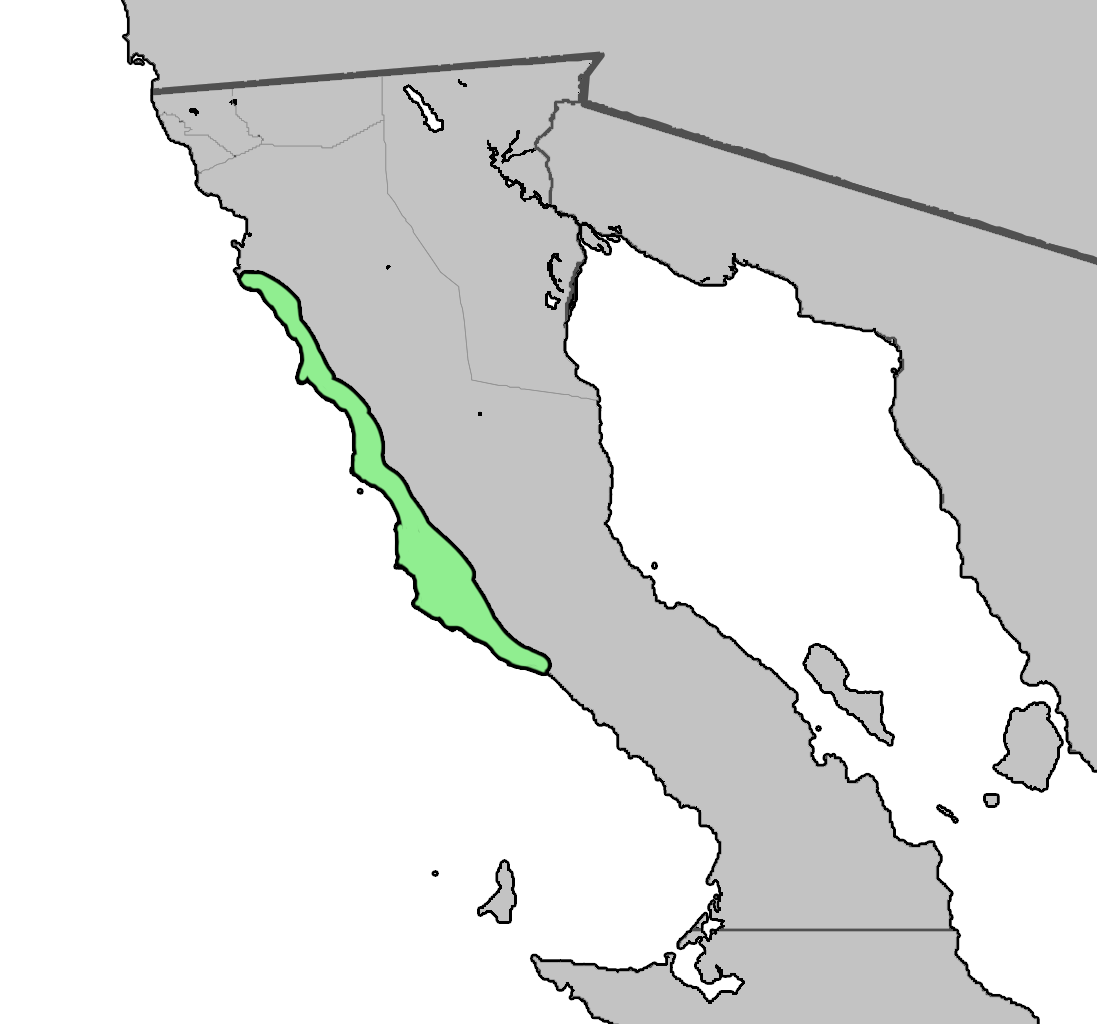
- Distribution of Dudleya ingens (green)

Synonyms
- Dudleya eximia Johanss.; Dudleya tenuifolia P.H. Thomson; Echeveria ingens (Rose) A.Berger

= Dudleya ingens =

Species of succulent

Dudleya ingens is a species of perennial succulent plant in the family Crassulaceae commonly known as the rock liveforever or Baja liveforever. A relatively large member of the genus Dudleya, this species has long green succulent leaves, and in April to June is characterized by pale yellow to white pink-tinged flowers topping tall, reddish inflorescences. It has a stem clothed densely with old, leathery leaves, and the inflorescence may be nodding, with the floral branches bearing the flowers tending to unfurl like the fronds of a fern. It is similar in appearance to Dudleya brittonii, but differs in range and chromosome number. This species is endemic to the state of Baja California in Mexico, being found from Santo Tomás to the southern coast of the state.

== Description ==
As a member of the subgenus Dudleya, this species has a basal rosette with evergreen leaves and a flower with tight petals that form a tube. The stem (referred to as a caudex) is densely clothed with old leathery leaves, branching rarely. On top of the caudex is a rosette containing the vegetative leaves. There are up to 70 leaves, which are green or slightly glaucous. The floral stem is reddish and tall, with up to 30 bracts. The inflorescence is nodding in immaturity, and has terminal branches that may unfurl like a fern. The terminal branches have up to 20 flowers. The flowers have petals that are colored a pale yellow to white.

=== Morphology ===
The caudex on this species ranges from 1.5 to 6 cm (0.59 to 2.36 in) thick, and may be short or elongating to up to 40 cm (16 in), unbranched or only branching a few times. The rosettes are 5 to 40 cm (2.0 to 15.7 in) in diameter, containing 20–70 leaves. The leaves are green or have a slightly glaucous surface texture. The leaves are shaped oblong, tapering from the base or somewhat broadened in the upper third, 7 to 25 cm (2.8 to 9.8 in) long, 1 to 5.5 cm (0.39 to 2.17 in) wide, 3 to 11 mm (0.12 to 0.43 in) thick, with the margins acute towards the base, the base of the leaf 1.5 to 6 cm (0.59 to 2.36 in) wide and 1 to 3 mm (0.039 to 0.118 in) high. The old leaves when dry are thick and leathery, densely clothing the caudex.

The floral stems are reddish, 30 to 90 cm (12 to 35 in) tall, and 4 to 15 mm (0.16 to 0.59 in) thick, covered in about 10–30 leaves, leafless in the lower 10 to 30 cm (3.9 to 11.8 in) base. The cauline leaves are positioned mostly horizontal to ascending, shaped triangular, with an acute tip, the lowermost 1 to 4 cm (0.39 to 1.57 in) long and 7 to 20 mm (0.28 to 0.79 in) wide. The inflorescence may sometimes be nodding when immature, and is often glaucous, 5 to 20 cm (2.0 to 7.9 in) wide, with 3–4 branches that in turn rebranch 0–2 times. The terminal branches (cincinni) are circinate (unfurling like the frond of a fern), but in maturity tend to be in an ascending position, 4 to 15 cm (1.6 to 5.9 in) with 10–20 flowers (from 6 to up to 30 in extreme cases). The pedicels are erect or ascending in flower, and erect in fruit, the lowermost 5 to 15 mm (0.20 to 0.59 in) long.

The calyx is 4.5 to 6 mm (0.18 to 0.24 in) wide, and 6 to 7 mm (0.24 to 0.28 in) high, sub-truncate to tapering below. The segments of the calyx are triangular, the tips acute to sub-acuminate, 4 to 6 mm (0.16 to 0.24 in) long and 2 to 3 mm (0.079 to 0.118 in) wide. The petals are colored a pale yellow to white, and often are tinged with pink, shaped oblong with an acute tip, 10 to 15 mm (0.39 to 0.59 in) long, and 2 to 3 mm (0.079 to 0.118 in) wide, connate for 3 to 6 mm (0.12 to 0.24 in).

== Taxonomy ==
=== Taxonomic history ===
The type specimen of this species was collected by Townshend Stith Brandegee, a noted botanical explorer of Baja California, in June of 1893, at San Telmo. Joseph Nelson Rose, in his work on revising the North American Crassulaceae with Nathaniel Lord Britton, made the first description of this species in 1903 as part of their creation of the genus Dudleya.

In 1933, botanist Donald A. Johansen described Dudleya viridicata, the Colonet liveforever, based on living plants collected in 1931 at the mesa on Punta Colonet, Baja California, by Howard E. Gates. Johansen notes the unusually vivid green color of the plants collected by Gates, thus giving the specific epithet viridicata. The flowers are pale yellow to white. In his 1951 dissertation on the genus, botanist Reid Moran also found the plants in the locality to be diploid, as opposed to the tetraploid majority of D. ingens. However, Moran noted that the plants in the Colonet area seemed to differ little from the D. ingens found at the type locality in San Telmo. Moran does note, though, that the type specimen of D. viridicata appears most similar to another diploid, Dudleya brittonii, and that his placement of this taxa in D. ingens was not without some hesitancy. Some sources still list this species, as an ambiguous form or hybrid of D. ingens and/or D. brittonii.

In 1935, Johansen published another species, Dudleya eximia, based on plants collected by Gates at a hill north of Mission San Vicente, about 5 miles from the coast. Johansen notes that the characteristics of distinguishing this supposed "well marked species" is the enormous size and vivid greenness of the rosettes, the small size of the cauline leaves, and the peculiar coloration of the inflorescence and its flowers. The flowers are colored white, but marked with enough red that it appears as a rosy-red. Moran, in his 1951 dissertation, notes that this "species" is in fact just a rather large form of D. ingens. Moran does also comment that at the type locality in late March of 1940, the young floral stems of these plants were only about two inches high, while elsewhere D. ingens was already in flower.

=== Characteristics ===
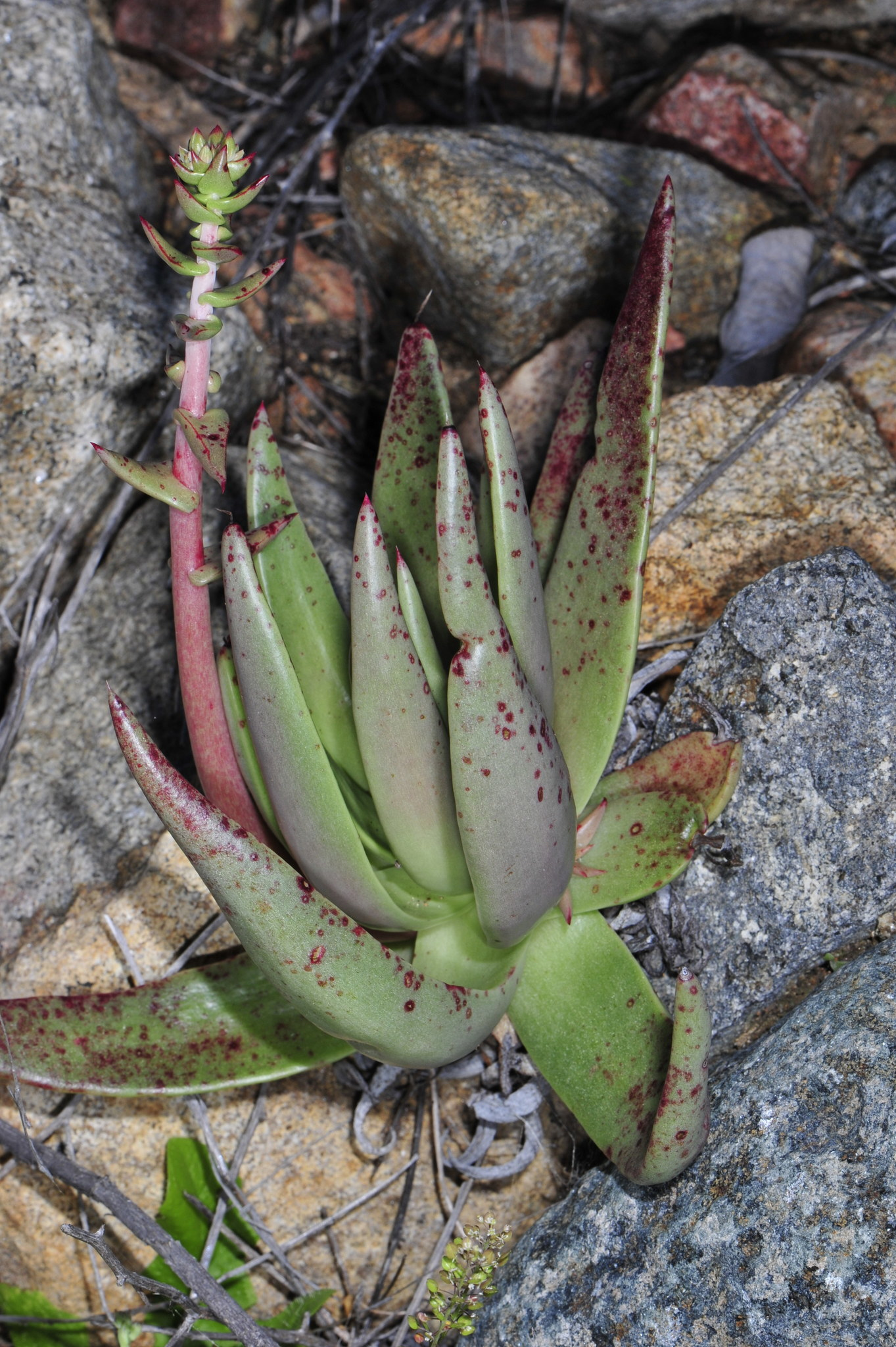
The inland form of Dudleya ingens. Note the narrower, and less numerous leaves.

The most recent definition of this species, by Reid Moran in his 1951 thesis, includes many plants of rather diverse appearance. The plants on the coast are rather large, with 30–70 rosette leaves that are up to 25 cm (9.8 in) long and 5.5 cm (2.2 in) wide, and flowers with petals that are often yellowish. The inland form, occupying the foothills and the western slope of the Peninsular Ranges in the area, is smaller, with 20–40 rosettes leaves which are up to 15 cm (5.9 in) long and 2 cm (0.79 in) wide. In areas like Arroyo San Telmo and Arroyo Seco, the gradual transition from coastal to inland form may be witnessed.

The large coastal form is very similar to Dudleya brittonii. The two plants may be separated on the basis that D. ingens has a lower number of maximum rosette leaves, that the leaves tend to be narrower, and that they are green to slightly glaucous rather than green to chalky and farinose. The inflorescence on D. ingens is less dense, with fewer main branches and longer terminal branches, and the flowers are larger, with the petal color varying from yellowish to white or pink. Relative to the base number of chromosomes in the genus, D. brittonii is a diploid, with a chromosome count of n=17. D. ingens, on the other hand, is mostly a tetraploid, with a majority of plants having a chromosome count of n=34.

=== Phylogeny ===
The majority of plants in this species are tetraploid relative to the base chromosome number of the genus. A few plants in this species are diploids, particularly around the Punta Colonet area. According to Reid Moran, in his 1951 dissertation on the genus, the variation from the coastal form to inland form may suggest segmental allopolyploidy, with one parent being a large coastal plant with yellowish flowers and the other a smaller interior form with white to pink flowers. The diploid plants are therefore presumed to be similar to that of the parental type.

D. ingens is known to hybridize along its range with other Dudleya.

- Dudleya attenuata subsp. attenuata × D. ingens Moran (Colonet hybrid liveforever) - Occurs near Colonet and San Quintín, Baja California.

== Distribution and habitat ==
Dudleya ingens occurs mostly along the coast and foothills of northwestern Baja California, from the vicinity of Santo Tomás and San Vicente south to Puerto Faro San José. It occurs from the coastal plain to as far inland as the western slope of the Sierra de San Pedro Martir, with the inland form taking on a markedly different appearance, but intermediate plants found between. Plants may vary from locality to locality, near Punta Colonet approaching the appearance of Dudleya brittonii.

== Cultivation ==
This species finds suitable use as a rock or container garden plant. It grows well in full sun with well-drained soil and very infrequent summer irrigation. It is cold hardy to 25 °F (−4 °C) and is drought tolerant. The leaves are evergreen, and in spring to early summer the red stems bearing pale yellow to white flowers appear. Leaves may be green or covered with red spots.

== Gallery ==
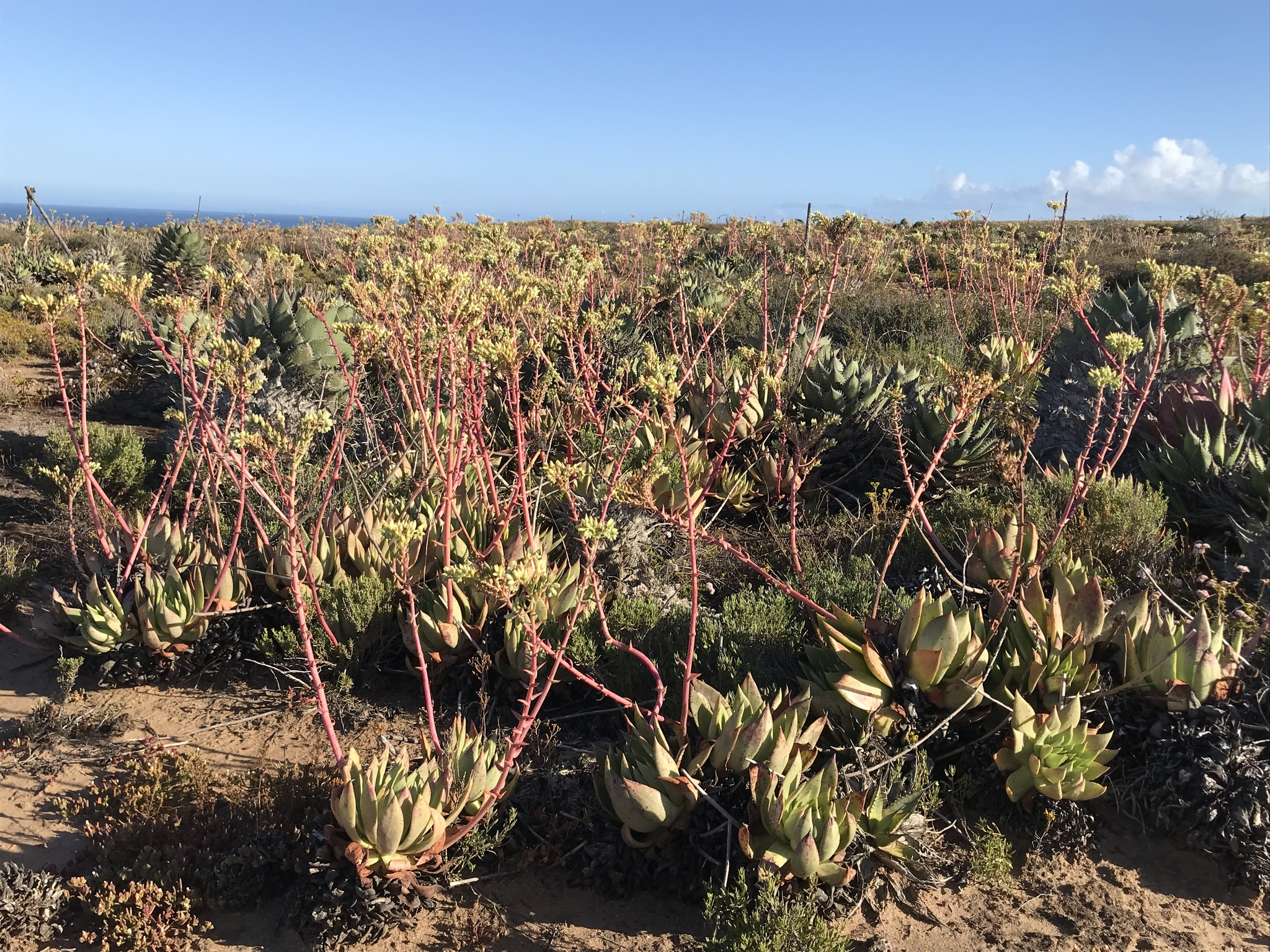
A field of Dudleya ingens in habitat

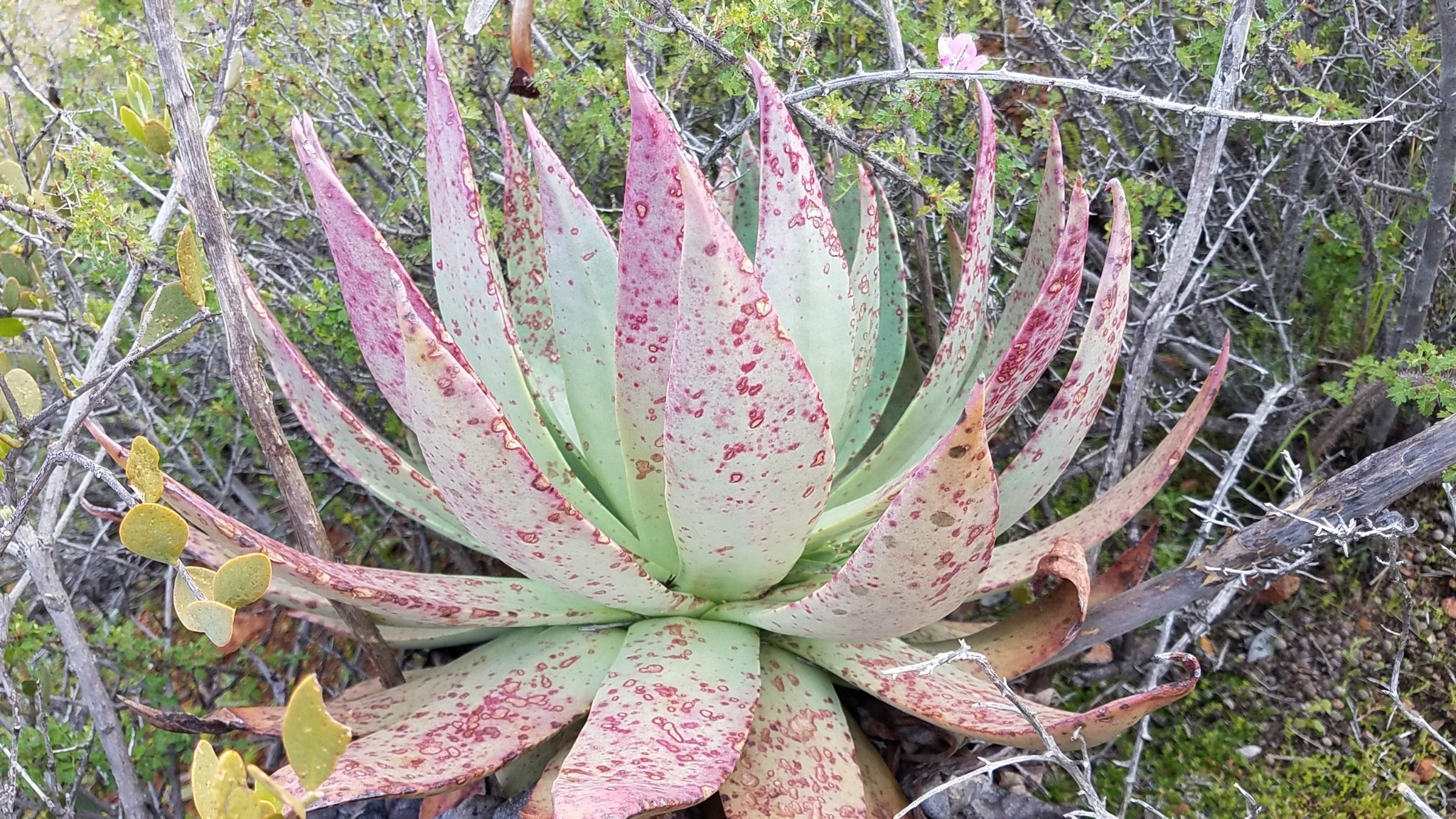
The rosette viewed from the side

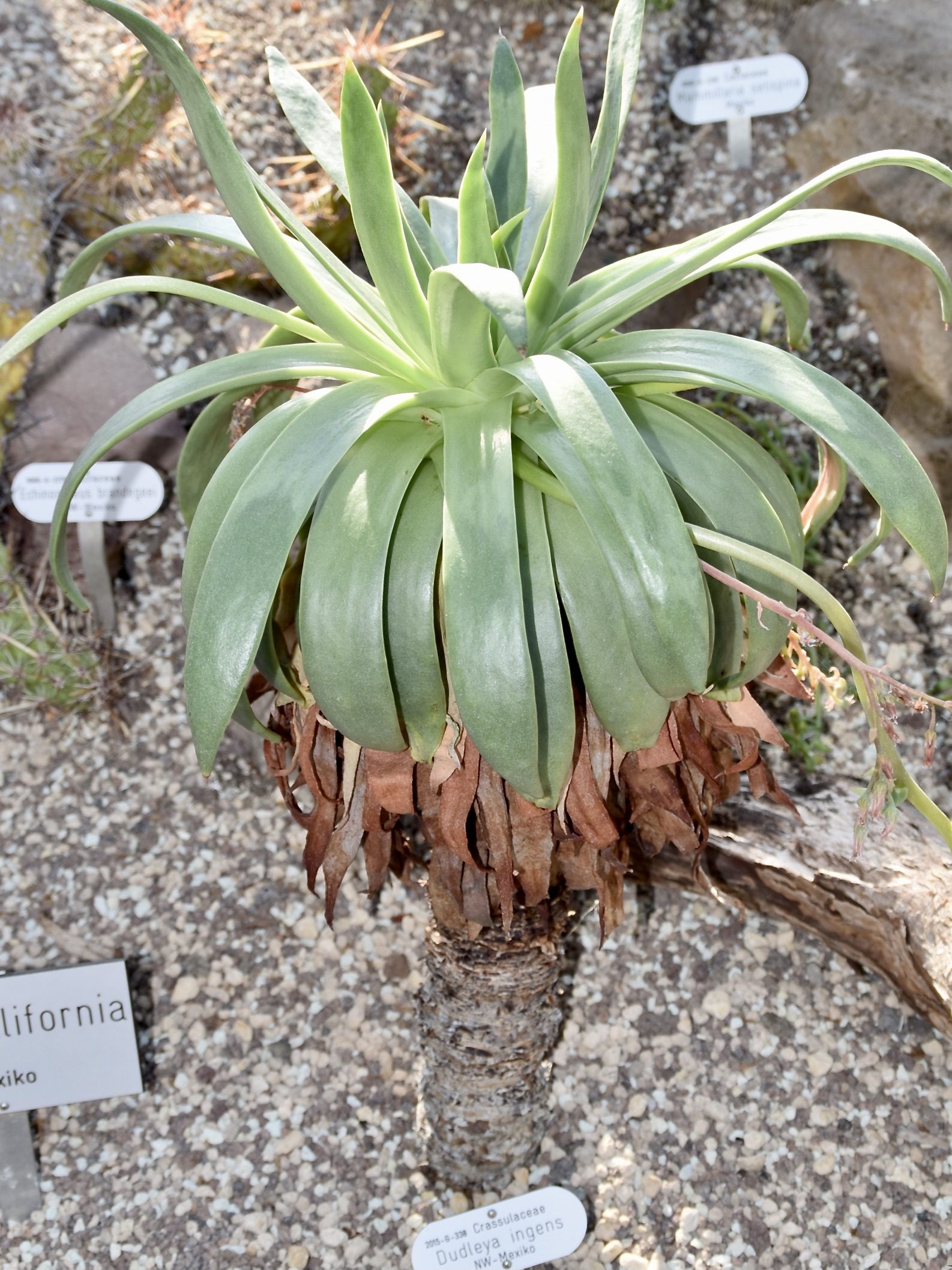
Dudleya ingens at the Berggarten in Hanover

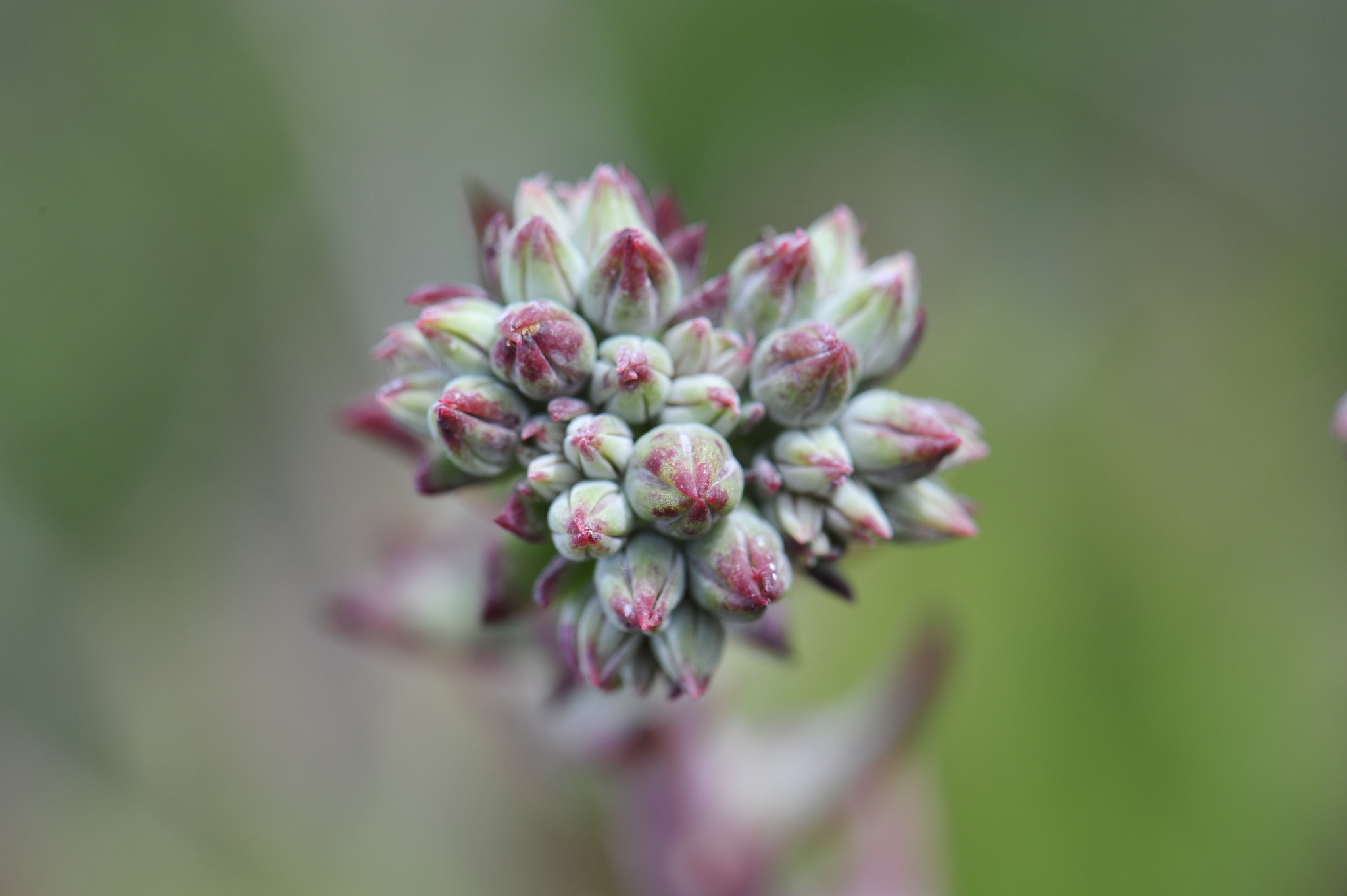
The immature flowers on the inflorescence

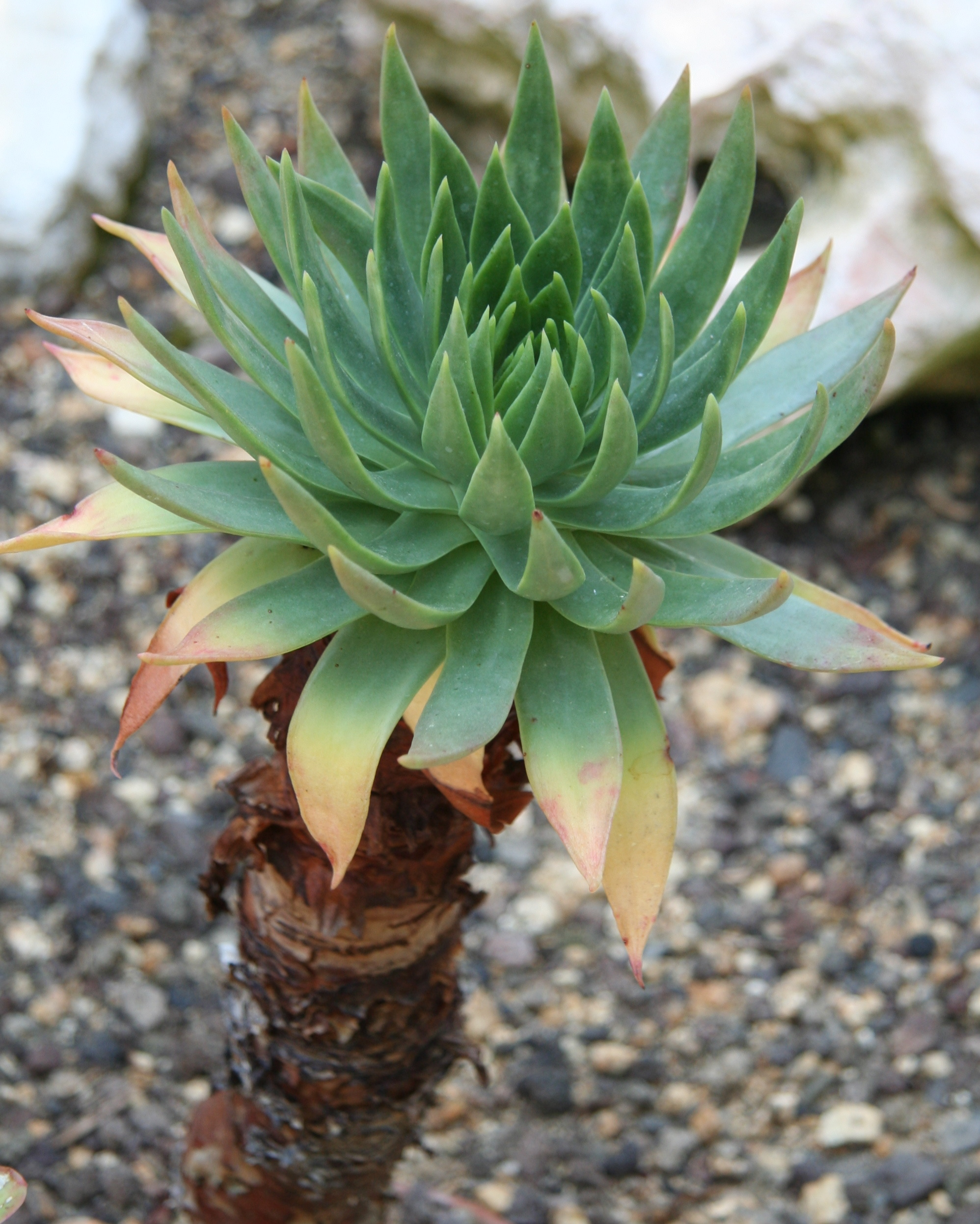
At the Berlin Botanical Garden

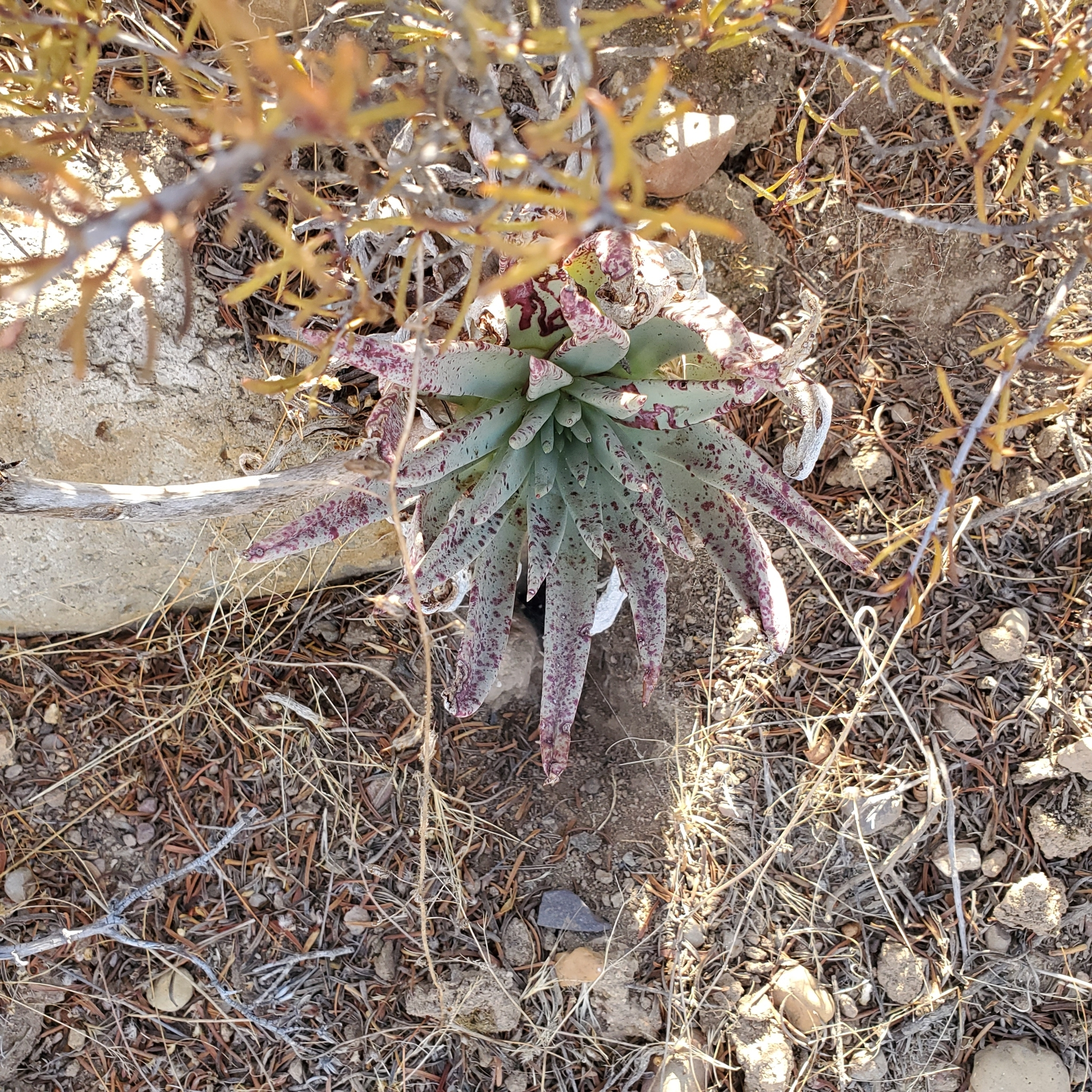
Growing in habitat, near El Rosario.
