= Farinha =

Farinha may refer to:

- Farinha, cassava flour as used in Brazilian cuisine
- Farinha River, Brazil
- Basílio Farinha (born 1977), Portuguese politician
- Guilherme Farinha (born 1956), Portuguese football coach
- Jonathan Farinha (born 1996), Trinidadian sprinter
- Manuel Antônio Farinha (died 1842), Brazilian admiral

== See also ==
- Da Farinha River, Brazil
- Farina (disambiguation)
