= PNN =

PNN may refer to:

- National Natural Parks System (Colombia) (Spanish: Unidad Administrativa Especial del Sistema de Parques Nacionales Naturales de Colombia PNN)
- Parliamentary and News Network, Australia
- Princeton Municipal Airport (Maine), USA (by IATA code)
- Probabilistic neural network, in machine learning
- Pinin, a protein encoded by the PNN gene
- Hagahai language (ISO 639 code: pnn)
- VOA-PNN, Voice of America Persian News Network
- Perineuronal net, in the brain
- Potsdamer Neueste Nachrichten, newspaper in Potsdam, Germany

== See also ==
- Pinin (disambiguation)
