= Pinin (disambiguation) =

Pinin may refer to:

- Pinin (PNN protein); a protein encoded by the PNN gene
- Pinyin romanization, pronounced "pin'in" in Hepburn Romaji, written as "ピンイン" in Japanese.

== People ==
- Battista Farina (1893-1966), nicknamed "Pinin"; car designer, founder of Pininfarina
- Dmitri Pinin (born 1975; Russian: Дмитрий Владимирович Пинин) Russian soccer player and coach

== Transportation ==
- Mitsubishi Pinin (1998-2007) compact SUV
- Ferrari Pinin (1980) concept car

== See also ==
- Pininfarina (disambiguation)
- PNN (disambiguation)
