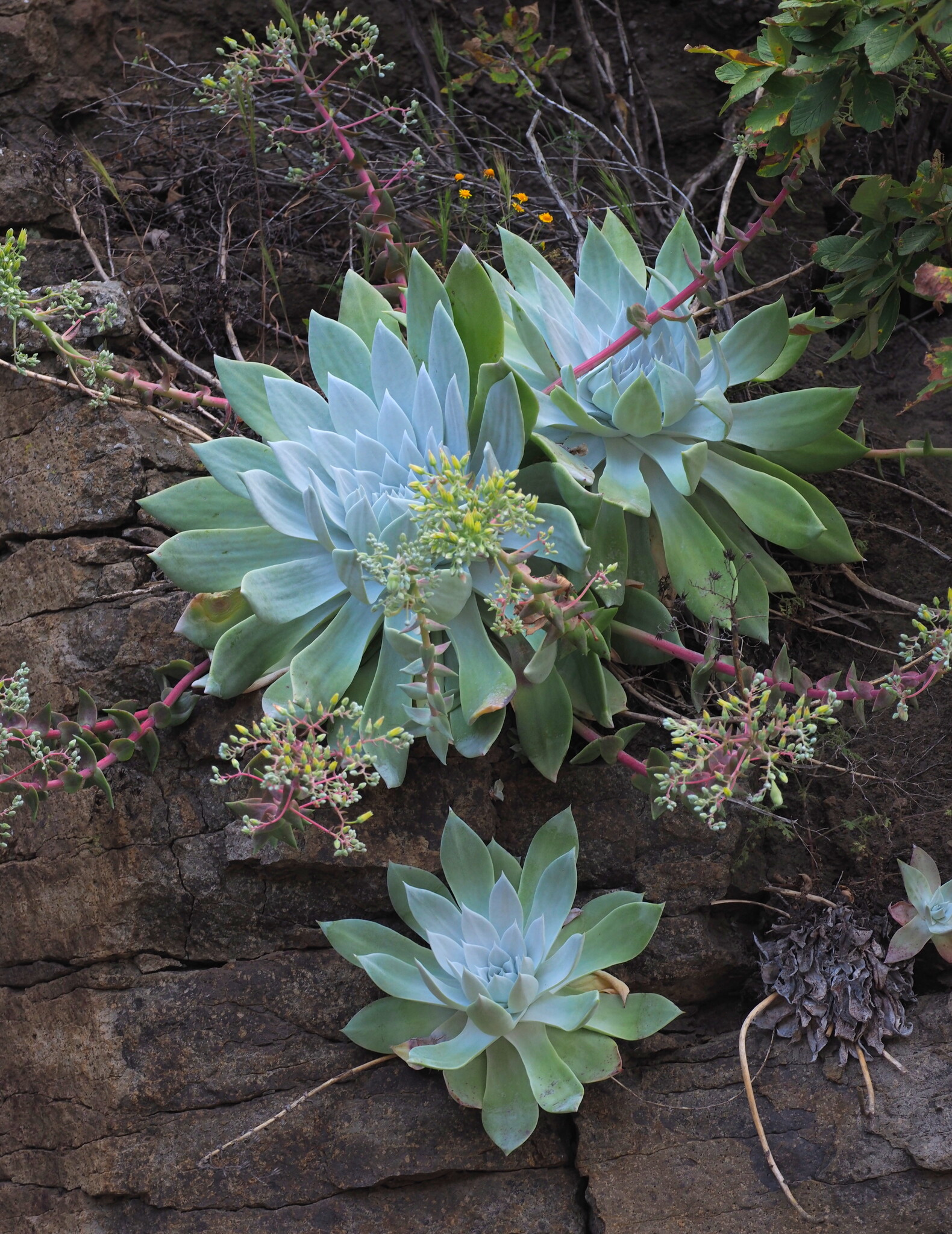
- Dudleya brittonii flowering in habitat

Scientific classification
- Kingdom: Plantae
- Clade: Tracheophytes
- Clade: Angiosperms
- Clade: Eudicots
- Order: Saxifragales
- Family: Crassulaceae
- Genus: Dudleya
- Species: D. brittonii

Binomial name
- Dudleya brittonii D.A.Johans.
- Distribution of Dudleya brittonii and related species

Synonyms
- Dudleya candida subsp. brittonii (D.A.Johans.) Moran

= Dudleya brittonii =

Britton's liveforever

Species of succulent plant found in Mexico

Dudleya brittonii is a species of succulent plant in the family Crassulaceae commonly known as Britton's liveforever or giant chalk dudleya. It is endemic to a small coastal area of far northern Baja California, Mexico, growing on volcanic rocks and soils. One of the largest members of the genus Dudleya, this species is characterized by its white rosettes, covered in a chalky wax that has highest measured ultraviolet reflectivity reported from any plant, and in spring it develops large reddish inflorescences topped with yellowish flowers.

Dudleya brittonii forms a species complex with two other species, Dudleya josedelgadilloi and Dudleya reidmoranii, with the latter two considered historically synonymous with D. brittonii, but differing in their lack of the white wax and distinct inflorescence characteristics and phenology. Another close relative is Dudleya candida, which resembles a miniaturized form of D. brittonii that is endemic to the Coronado Islands. D. brittonii is superficially similar to Dudleya pulverulenta, the chalk dudleya, which has white rosettes and achieves a similar size, but is otherwise quite distinct in terms of inflorescences and flowers. One of the most common Dudleya in cultivation, this species is valued in horticulture for its hardy nature, low water requirements, and easy care.

== Description ==
Dudleya brittonii is a conspicuous and large-growing species found in northwestern Baja California. It has large rosettes topped with chalky white leaves, and begins flowering in March or April, and may continue into late May or early June. The inflorescences are borne from large reddish-pink peduncles and are topped with erect, tubular yellowish flowers.

=== Morphology ===
Stem / caudex: The caudex is stout, and up to 10 cm (3.9 in) wide. The caudex is usually unbranched, giving plants solitary rosettes, but may sometimes branch to form numerous rosettes, often in situations where there is injury to the growing point.

Rosettes: Rosettes usually solitary (see above), and measure 10–50 cm (3.9–19.7 in) wide. The rosettes have 40 to 120 leaves.

Leaves: The leaves are evergreen, and heavily glaucous, covered in a chalky epicuticular wax. The leaves are linear to oblong-lanceolate in shape, becoming much broader above the middle, and are acute to gradually acuminate towards the subulate reddish tip. The leaves measure 7–11 cm (2.8–4.3 in) long by 4.5–5.5 cm (1.8–2.2 in) wide. Old leaves wither and persist on the caudex indefinitely.

Peduncles: There are 4 to 6 peduncles per plant, which are pigmented red and often somewhat glaucous, and measure 30–100 cm (12–39 in) long. Lining these peduncles are the cauline leaves, which are also red and somewhat glaucous, and have a narrowly triangular and somewhat deflexed shape, and are attached to the peduncle in a sessile fashion, with slightly auriculate base. The cauline leaves are 1–3 cm (0.39–1.18 in) long, diminishing in size further up the peduncle.

Inflorescences: 5 to 6 terminal branches (cincinni) split from the tip of the peduncle, measuring 2–11 cm (0.79–4.33 in) long, and these cincinni may fork up to 2 times. The inflorescence has an overall shape of an inverted pyramid 7–22 cm (2.8–8.7 in) across. Additional, simpler cincinni may also emerge from the axils of the bracts on the peduncle. There are 5 to 20 flowers per cincinnus, borne on reddish pedicels 6–15 mm (0.24–0.59 in) long, with an erect orientation. Small bracts, with a linear to lanceolate-acuminate shape, subtend each flower.

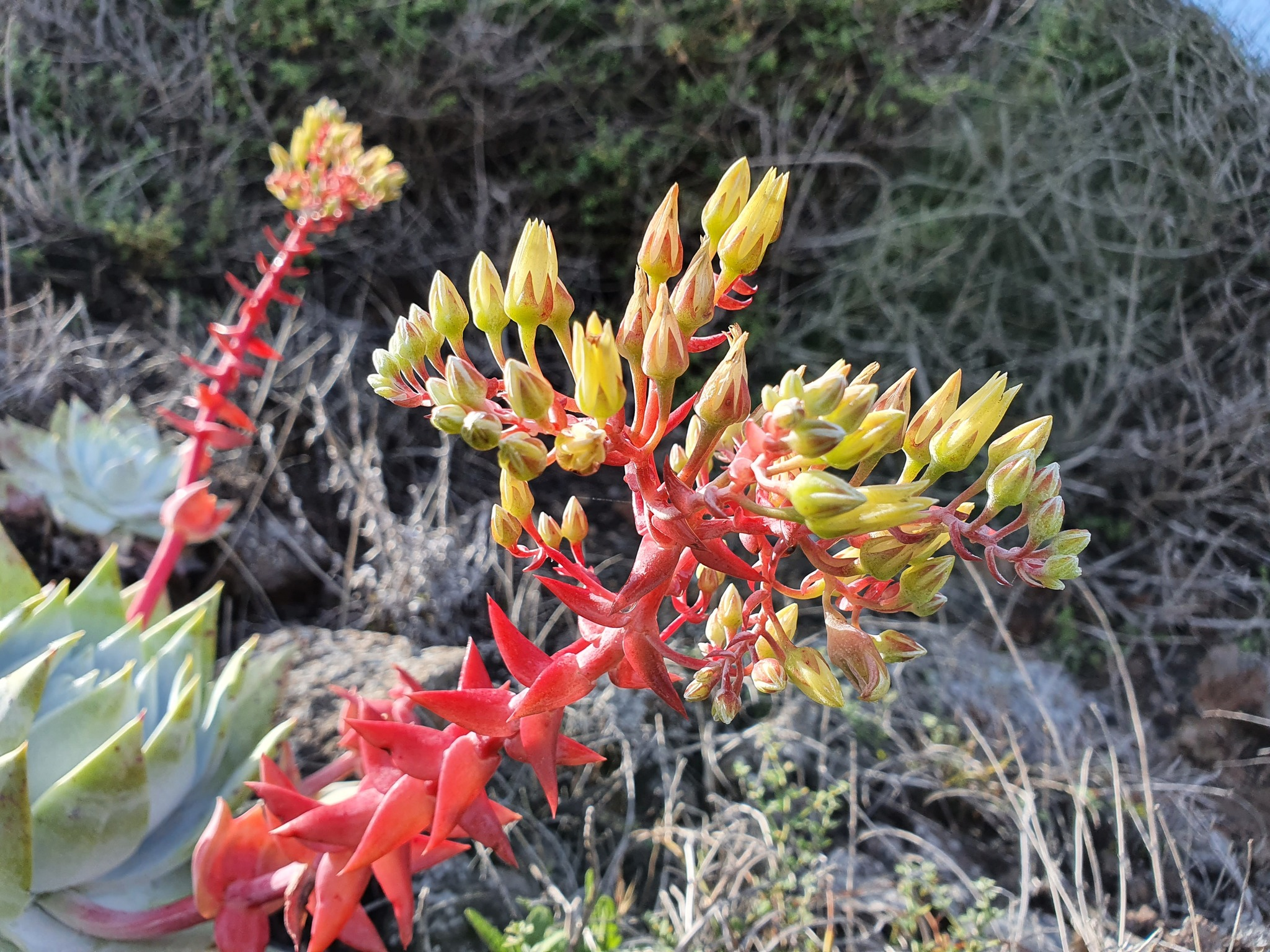
Inflorescence of Dudleya brittonii

Flowers: The calyx is 5 mm (0.20 in) long, with the sepals (lobes) distinct for about half that length, the sepals shaped long-lanceolate with an acute tip and bright green. The petals are connate for about 42% of their length, forming a narrow cylinder. The petals have a linear-lanceolate shape, with somewhat distinct midrib and a mucronate tip, and are about 9 mm (0.35 in) long. The petals have a color described as pale yellow, whitish, or hyaline, with the midribs conspicuously glaucous. The anthers are a chestnut-brown color, and the carpels are erect and compressed, with a length of 6–9.5 mm (0.24–0.37 in). The style is 1–2 mm (0.039–0.079 in) long.

=== Phytochemistry ===
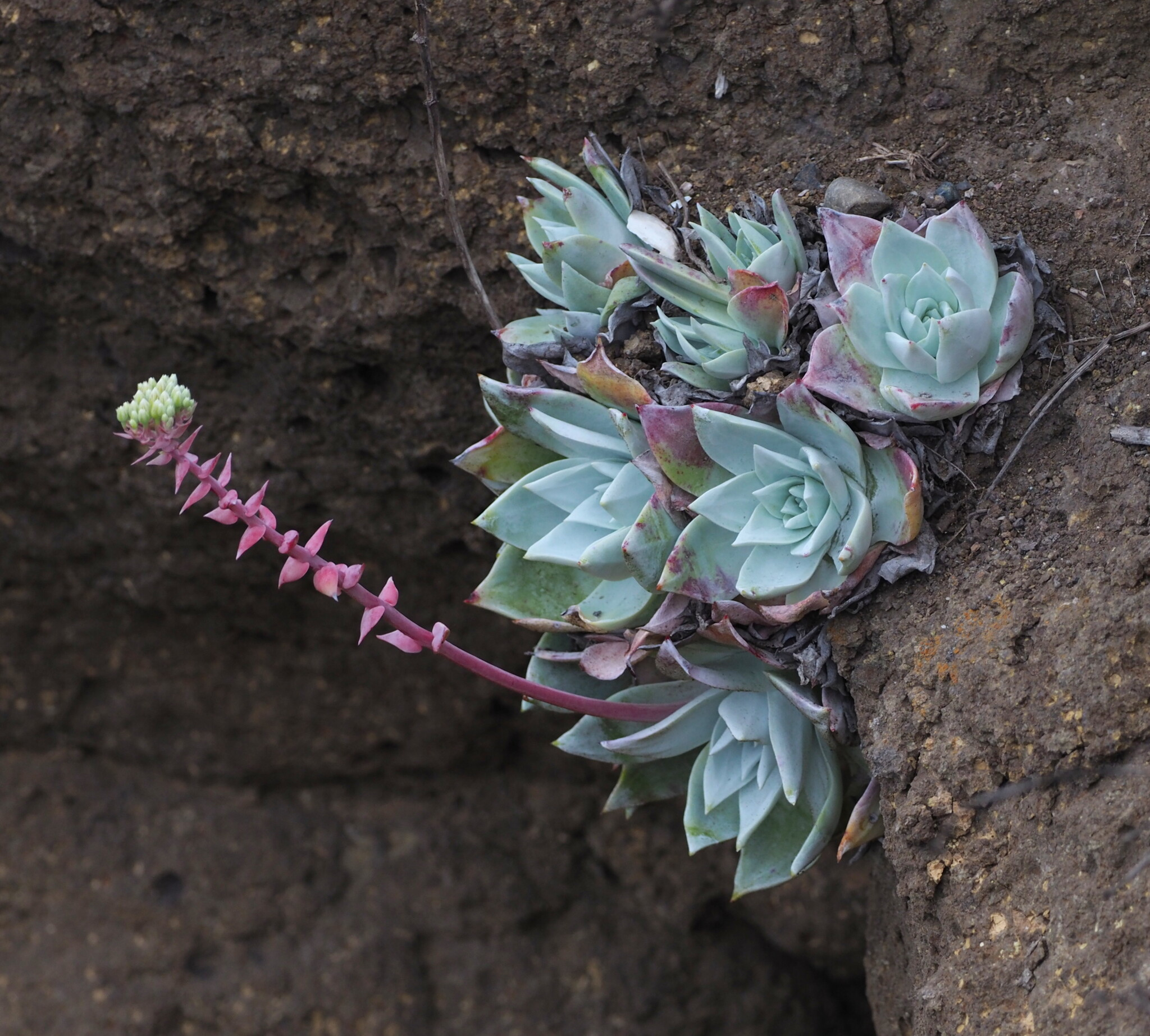
Small examples of Dudleya brittonii just prior to flowering

Dudleya brittonii is notable for its waxy appearance, and this epicuticular wax is in fact the most highly ultraviolet reflective substance discovered in plants. The wax is composed of long-chain hydrocarbons that reflect over 70% of solar UV wavelengths that reach Earth's surface, compared to less than 10% in similar Dudleya that lack the wax. The wax also slows the turnover of leaves during droughts, and is associated with reduced damage by herbivorous insects. These properties come with a tradeoff, as the wax limits the absorptance of photosynthetically active radiation, which puts it at a disadvantage with competing species.

== Taxonomy ==
=== Taxonomic history ===
Dudleya brittonii was discovered by a Mr. Howard E. Gates at the mouth of a canyon north of the 32nd parallel, "midway between Descanso and Ensenada." Reid Moran identifies this location as the mouth of the canyon of the Rio Guadalupe. D. brittonii was described by Donald A. Johansen in 1933, in the fourth volume of the Cactus & Succulent Journal of America. It is named in honor of Nathaniel Lord Britton, one of the botanists who first described the genus Dudleya.

Reid Moran, in his time the expert on the genus Dudleya, in his thesis work moved to place D. brittonii as a subspecies under the closely related species Dudleya candida, given the close relationship of the two species and the priority of D. candida as the older name. However, as Moran never validly published his thesis, as required by Article 29.1 of the International Code of Nomenclature for algae, fungi, and plants (ICN), the combination Dudleya candida subsp. brittonii remains a nomen invalidum.

In northwestern Baja California, a number of green-leaved plants of similar size and somewhat similar inflorescences, eventually came under the umbrella of Dudleya brittonii by the time Moran finished his thesis in 1951, known as the "green form" of D. brittonii. Johansen did not include these plants within the species at the time of his description. Although Moran observed their differences in phenology, as the green form often flowered later, and noted that their true relationship seemed unknown, he decided no further taxonomic distinction was necessary. Moran also acknowledged the similarity of the green form to Dudleya ingens, but recognized that D. ingens was tetraploid (n=34), while D. brittonii including the green form was a diploid (n=17). An aberrant population of D. ingens described by Johansen as Dudleya viridicata from Punta Colonet is diploid, but Moran kept that population within D. ingens, although with some hesitancy.

Paul H. Thomson, a rare fruit grower and amateur botanist interested in Dudleya, later attempted to describe the green form of D. brittonii as a distinct species, naming it Dudleya viridis. Thomson failed to designate a type specimen in his description, so Dudleya viridis is also a nomen invalidum according to Article 37.4 of the ICN.

In 2023, a study in Madroño by Thomas W. Mulroy, C. Matt Guilliams, and Kristen Hasenstab-Lehman examined Dudleya brittonii and its green form, and established the green form as constituting three new taxa (two species and a distinct subspecies) separate from D. brittonii but within a species complex. D. brittonii has since been restored back to its narrower definition as Johansen originally described it, while the green form has been separated into Dudleya josedelgadilloi and Dudleya reidmoranii. The study was based on extensive study of specimens in the field, cultivated specimens, and quantitative morphometric and multivariate statistical analysis to distinguish the entities, building on 40 years of study by Mulroy on the complex.

=== Characteristics ===
Dudleya brittonii is superficially similar to some species (Dudleya pulverulenta and Dudleya anthonyi) and even more closely related and similar to others (Dudleya candida, Dudleya josedelgadilloi, Dudleya reidmoranii).

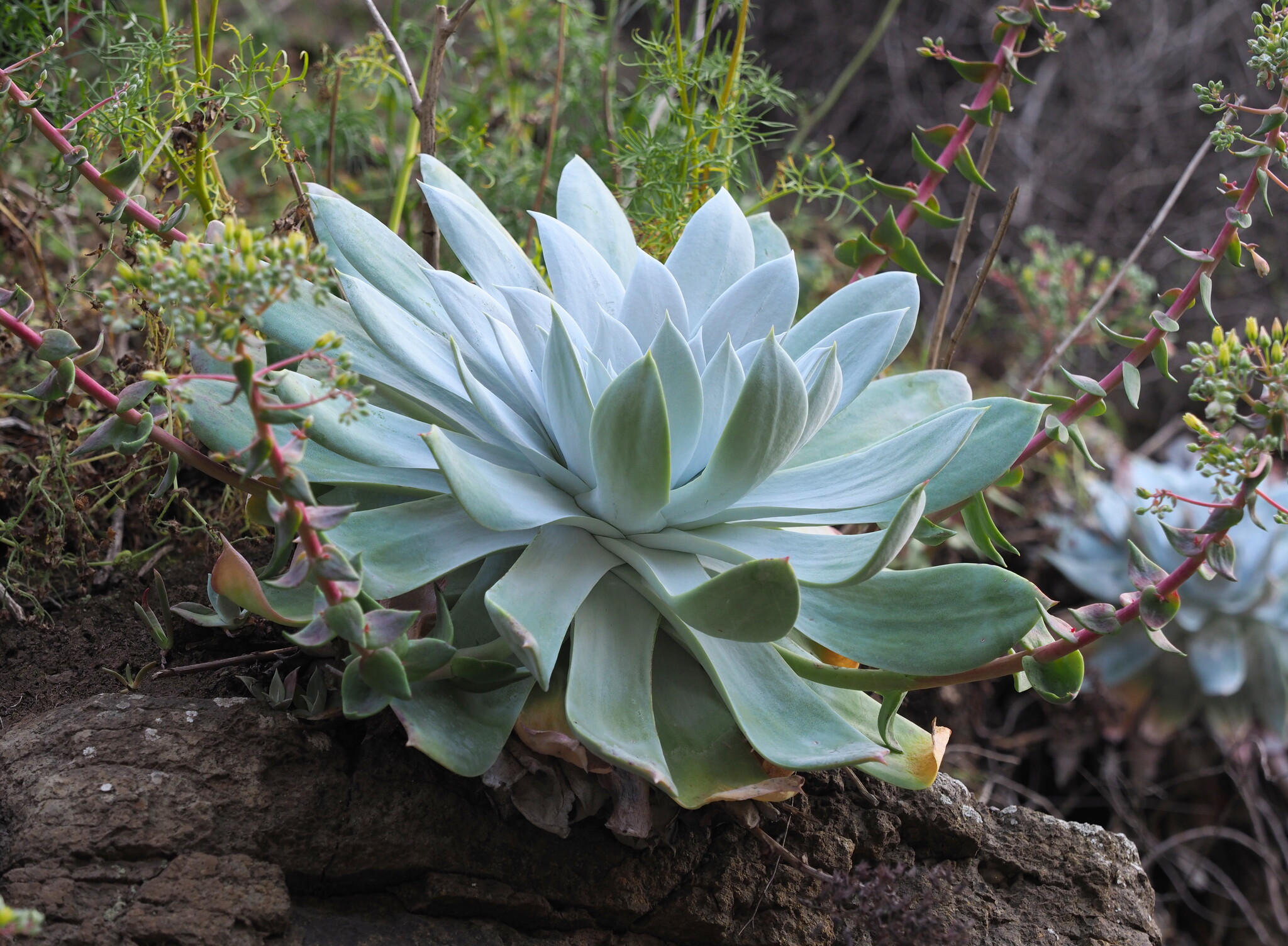
Dudleya brittonii, the rosette of a large plant in flower

The rosettes in D. brittonii are quite similar in appearance to those of the likewise waxy Dudleya pulverulenta and Dudleya anthonyi, although D. pulverulenta has a larger maximum rosette size of 60 cm (24 in), but with a much wider variability in size compared to brittonii. Compared to D. pulverulenta and D. anthonyi, D. brittonii has a distinct inflorescence morphology, in having pale yellow-petaled flowers that are oriented erect or spreading in anthesis, versus the hummingbird-adapted red-petaled, conspicuously pendent (downwards-facing) red flowers of D. pulverulenta and D. anthonyi.

==== Related species ====
Dudleya brittonii forms a species complex with two other relatives, Dudleya josedelgadilloi and Dudleya reidmoranii. These species have long been considered to be part of Dudleya brittonii, although they were never included in the original description.

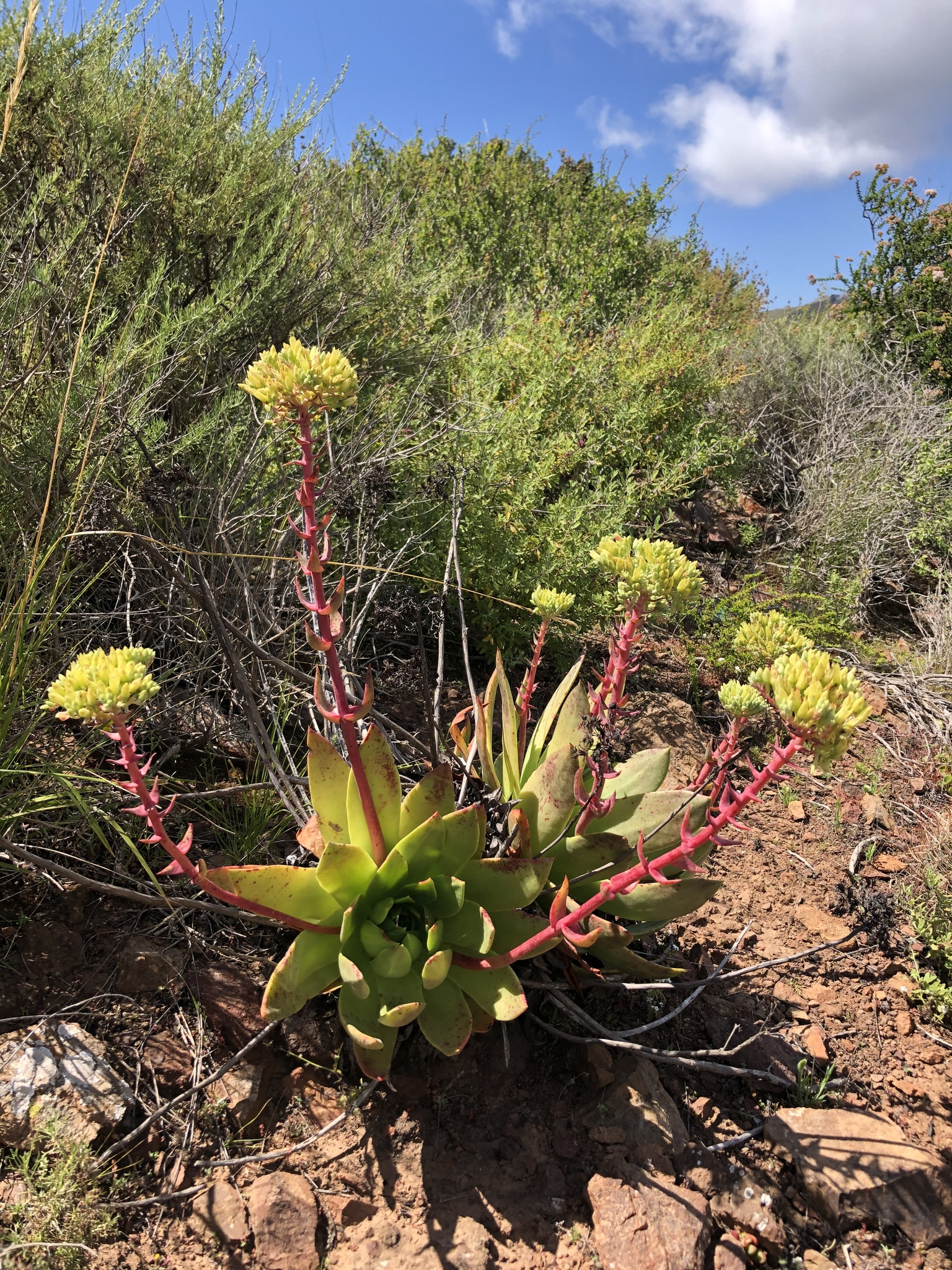
Dudleya josedelgadilloi, a related species once considered part of the "green form" of D. brittonii

D. josedelgadilloi mostly lacks the chalky wax, and has inflorescences with shorter pedicels as well as flowers that are more densely crowded on their terminal branches (known as cincinni), and is not sympatric (overlapping in range) with D. brittonii. A few populations of D. josedelgadilloi have semi-glaucous leaves, with some degree of waxiness. D. josedelgadilloi blooms from March or April into early June.

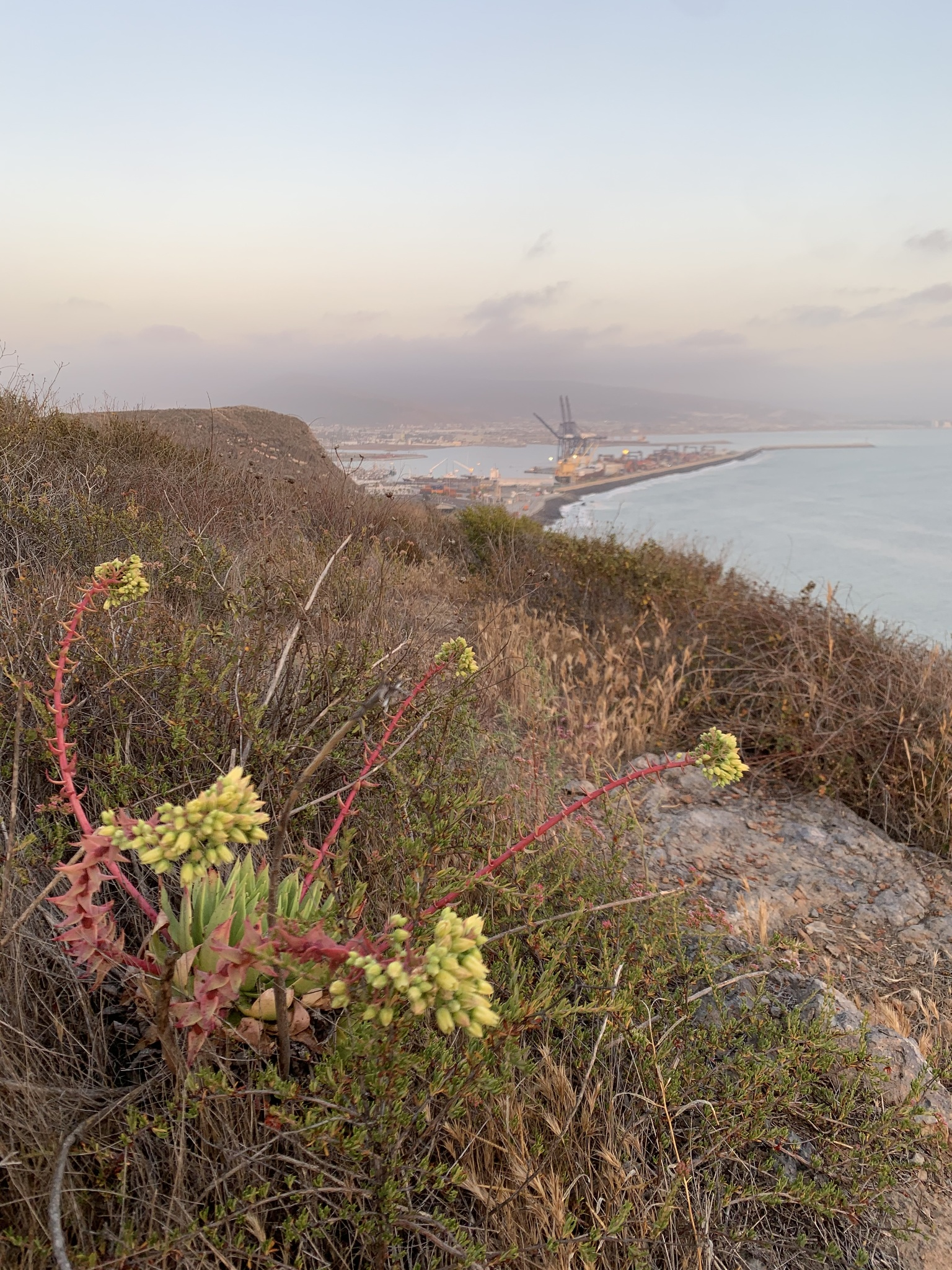
Dudleya reidmoranii, with downwards-facing inflorescence branches and flowers

Dudleya reidmoranii overlaps with D. brittonii in range, but shows considerable divergence in inflorescence morphology and phenology. D. reidmoranii notably has inflorescences with pendent cincinni and flowers, likely a similar adaptation to hummingbird pollination much like the aforementioned D. pulverulenta and anthonyi, and has a much later blooming period, varying from locality, than D. brittonii and D. josedelgadilloi. In areas where D. reidmoranii occurs with D. brittonii, D. reidmoranii has a 6-week to 3-month delay in flowering, blooming from late June or early July into August or later, indicating a possible isolating mechanism in two species that would otherwise be interfertile. Outside the area of sympatry, D. reidmoranii blooms from April to May into May or June.

Dudleya candida is an insular plant restricted to the Coronado Islands off the neighboring coast, and resembles a miniaturized version of the species in the complex, though with much smaller rosettes and a much higher number of rosettes per plant, forming large clumps. Dudleya candida also appears in both a waxy form, similar to typical D. brittonii, and a rarer, non-waxy, green form, similar to the two other members of the complex. The inflorescences are very similar to those of brittonii and josedelgadilloi, albeit smaller.

== Distribution and habitat ==
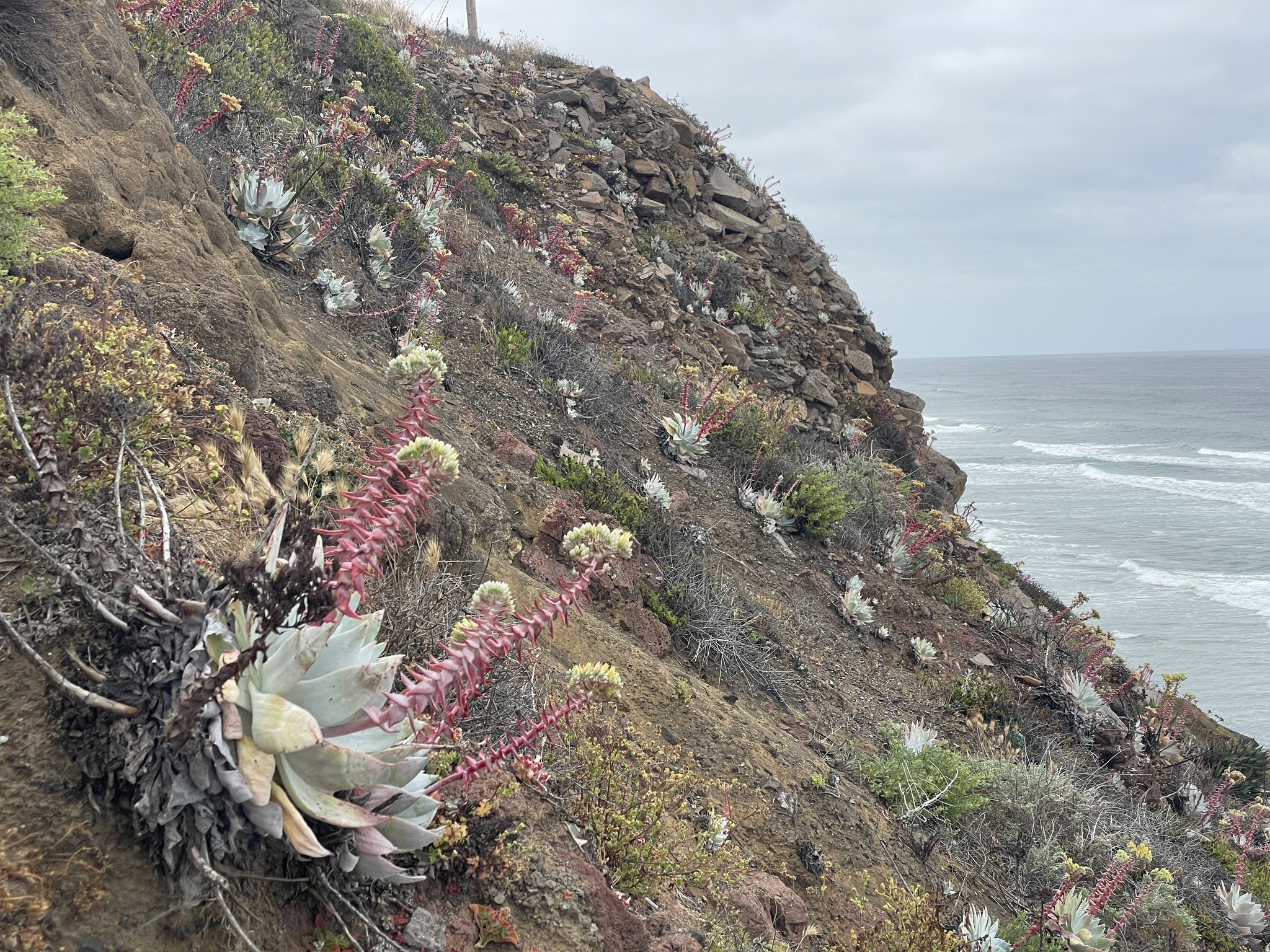
Several Dudleya brittonii flowering in a coastal habitat

Dudleya brittonii occurs from extreme northwest Baja California from La Misión south to the vicinity of Eréndira and on the island of Todos Santos. The glaucous, white form inhabits the bluff faces and steep slopes, whilst the green form inhabits rocky areas away from bluffs and the flat slopes of talus and soil below bluffs. Development along the Baja California coast is imperiling the species.

== Cultivation ==
Dudleya brittonii is cultivated as an ornamental plant for use in well-drained rock gardens and as a potted succulent.

It has gained the Royal Horticultural Society's Award of Garden Merit. In temperate climates it is normally grown under glass in cactus compost. However it can be placed outdoors in a sheltered, sunny spot during the summer months.

== See also ==
- Dudleya candida
- Dudleya pulverulenta
- Dudleya ingens
