= Pininfarina (disambiguation) =

Pininfarina is an Italian design house and coachbuilder.

Pininfarina may also refer to:

- Battista Pininfarina (1893–1966), founder of the company
- Sergio Pininfarina (1926–2012; born Sergio Farina), son of Battista Farina
- Andrea Pininfarina (1957–2008), son of Sergio Farina and grandson of Battista Farina
- Paolo Pininfarina (1958–2024), Italian engineer, designer and businessman
- Automobili Pininfarina, a manufacturer of high-performance sports and luxury electric vehicles owned by Mahindra

== See also ==
- Farina (disambiguation)
- Pinin (disambiguation)
