= Antonio Farina =

Italian composer

Antonio Farina (fl. 1675) was an Italian composer active in Venice. He is remembered for his serenatas.

== Recordings ==
- 3 serenatas on Serenate Napoletane, Andréanne Paquin, Ensemble Odysee dir. Andrea Friggi Pan Classics 2013
- Venere e Marte Valeria La Grotta, Mauro Borgioni, I Misici del Gran Principe & Samuele Lastrucci Glaux 2026
