= Epicuticular wax =

Wax coating on the plant cuticle

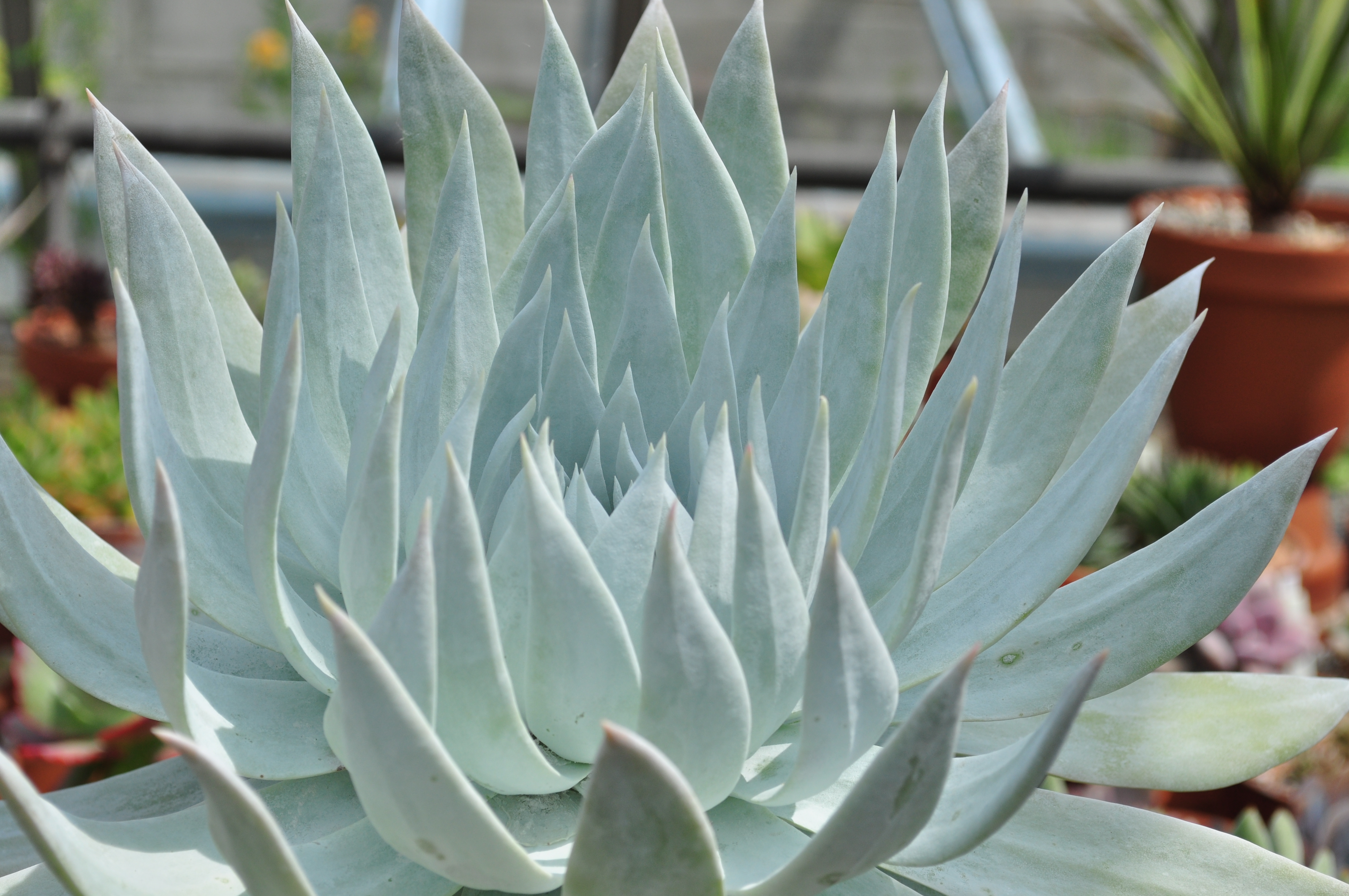
The epicuticular wax produced by Dudleya brittonii has the highest ultraviolet light (UV) reflectivity of any known naturally occurring biological substance.

Epicuticular wax is a waxy coating which covers the outer surface of the plant cuticle in land plants. It may form a whitish film or bloom on leaves, fruits and other plant organs. Chemically, it consists of hydrophobic organic compounds, mainly straight-chain aliphatic hydrocarbons with or without a variety of substituted functional groups. The epicuticular wax decreases surface wetting and moisture loss. Other functions include reflection of ultraviolet light, assisting in the formation of an ultra-hydrophobic and self-cleaning surface and acting as an anti-climb surface.

== Chemical composition ==
Common constituents of epicuticular wax are predominantly straight-chain aliphatic hydrocarbons that may be saturated or unsaturated and contain a variety of functional groups, such as -hydroxyl, carboxyl, and -ketoyl at the terminal position. This broadens the spectrum of wax composition to fatty acids, primary alcohols, and aldehydes; if the substitution occurs at the mid-chain, it will result in β-diketones and secondary alcohols. Other major components of epicuticular waxes are long-chain n-alkanoic acids such as C_{24}, C_{26}, and C_{28}.

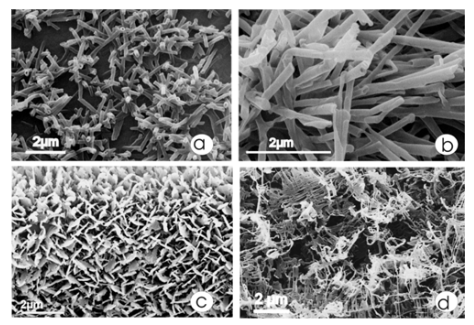
Wax morphologies visualized with SEM: wax tubules dominated by nonacosan-10-ol on a Thalictrum flavum glaucum L. (Desf.) leaf in (a), tubules dominated by β-diketones of a Eucalyptus gunnii Hook leaf in (b), leaf wax of Triticum aestivum 'Naturastar' in (c), and rodlets demonstrating terminal dendritic branching composed of a complex mixture of several compounds on a Brassica oleracea L. leaf in (d).

These waxes can be composed of a variety of compounds which differ between plant species. Wax tubules and wax platelets often have chemical as well as morphological differences. Tubules can be separated into two groups; the first primarily containing secondary alcohols, and the second containing β-diketones. Platelets are either dominated by triterpenoids, alkanes, aldehydes, esters, secondary alcohols, or flavonoids. However, chemical composition is not diagnostic of a tubule or platelet, as this does not determine the morphology.

Paraffins occur in leaves of peas and cabbages, for example. Leaves of carnauba palm and banana feature alkyl esters. The asymmetrical secondary alcohol 10-nonacosanol appears in most gymnosperms such as Ginkgo biloba and Sitka spruce as well as many of the Ranunculaceae, Papaveraceae and Rosaceae and some mosses. Symmetrical secondary alcohols are found in Brassicaceae including Arabidopsis thaliana. Primary alcohols (most commonly octacosan-1-ol) occur in Eucalyptus, legumes, and most Poaceae grasses. Grasses may also feature β-diketones, as do Eucalyptus, box Buxus and the Ericaceae. Young beech leaves, sugarcane culms and lemon fruit exhibit aldehydes. Triterpenes are the primary component in fruit waxes of apple, plum and grape. Cyclic constituents are often recorded in epicuticular waxes, as in Nicotiana but are generally minor constituents. They may include phytosterols such as β-sitosterol and pentacyclic triterpenoids such as ursolic acid and oleanolic acid and their respective precursors, α-amyrin and β-amyrin.

== Farina ==
Many species of the genus Primula and ferns, such as Cheilanthes, Pityrogramma and Notholaena, as well as many genera of Crassulaceae succulent plants, produce a mealy, whitish to pale-yellow glandular secretion known as farina that is not an epicuticular wax, but consists largely of crystals of a different class of polyphenolic compounds known as flavonoids. Unlike epicuticular wax, farina is secreted by specialised glandular hairs, rather than by the cuticle of the entire epidermis.

== Physical properties ==
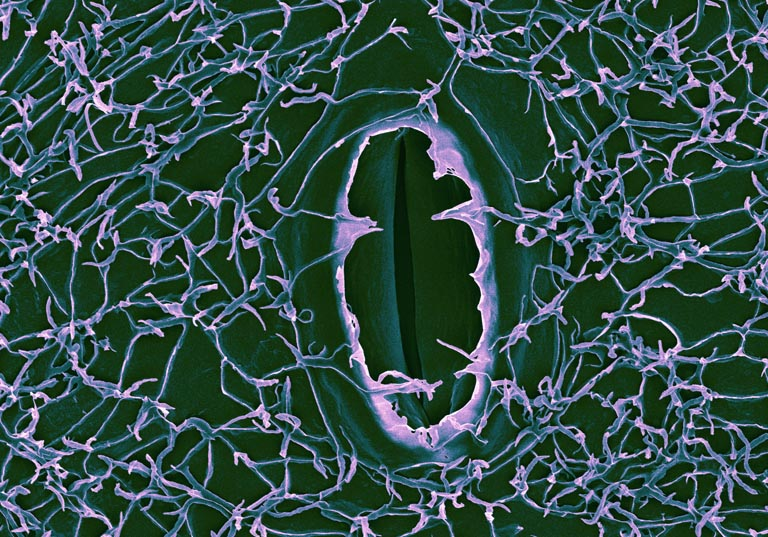
Epicuticular wax crystals surrounding a stomatal aperture on the lower surface of a rose leaf

Epicuticular waxes are mostly solids at ambient temperature, with melting points above about 40 °C (100 °F). They are soluble in organic solvents such as chloroform and hexane, making them accessible for chemical analysis, but in some species esterification of acids and alcohols into estolides or the polymerization of aldehydes may give rise to insoluble compounds. Solvent extracts of cuticle waxes contain both epicuticular and cuticular waxes, often contaminated with cell membrane lipids of underlying cells. Epicuticular wax can now also be isolated by mechanical methods that distinguish the epicuticular wax outside the plant cuticle from the cuticular wax embedded in the cuticle polymer. As a consequence, these two are now known to be chemically distinct, although the mechanism that segregates the molecular species into the two layers is unknown. Recent scanning electron microscopy (SEM), atomic force microscopy (AFM) and neutron reflectometry studies on reconstituted wax films have found wheat epicuticular waxes; made up of surface epicuticular crystals and an underlying, porous background film layer to undergo swelling when in contact with water, indicating the background film is permeable and susceptible to the transport of water.

Epicuticular wax can reflect UV light, such as the white, chalky, wax coating of Dudleya brittonii, which has the highest ultraviolet light (UV) reflectivity of any known naturally occurring biological substance.

The term 'glaucous' is used to refer to any foliage, such as that of the family Crassulaceae, which appears whitish because of the waxy covering. Coatings of epicuticular flavonoids may be referred to as 'farina', the plants themselves being described as 'farinose' or 'farinaceous'.

== Epicuticular wax crystals ==
Epicuticular wax forms crystalline projections from the plant surface, which enhance their water repellency, create a self-cleaning property known as the lotus effect and reflect UV radiation. The shapes of the crystals are dependent on the wax compounds present in them. Asymmetrical secondary alcohols and β-diketones form hollow wax nanotubes, while primary alcohols and symmetrical secondary alcohols form flat plates Although these have been observed using the transmission electron microscope and scanning electron microscope the process of growth of the crystals had never been observed directly until Koch and coworkers studied growing wax crystals on leaves of snowdrop (Galanthus nivalis) and other species using the atomic force microscope. These studies show that the crystals grow by extension from their tips, raising interesting questions about the mechanism of transport of the molecules.

== Measurement techniques ==
Epicuticular waxes are recovered from terrestrial, marine, and lake environments, allowing for solvent extraction of biomarkers and then qualitative and quantitative profiling through gas chromatography–mass spectrometry (GC-MS) and GC flame ionization detection (GC-FID). GC-MS and GC-FID are preferential for identifying and quantifying n-alkanes and n-alkanoic acids. Isotope ratio analysis (GC-IRMS) measures relative abundance of carbon, hydrogen, and other isotopes with high precision. The carbon isotopic ratio is expressed between carbon-13 and carbon-12 as δ^{13}C relative to the international standard. The hydrogen isotopic ratio between deuterium and protium is expressed as δD relative to the international standard.

== Use as a biomarker ==
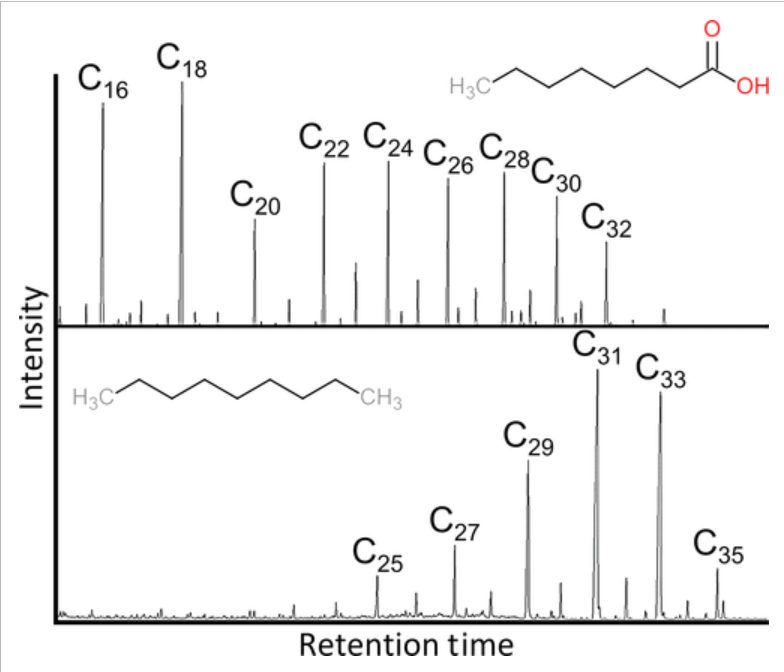
GC-MS trace of n-alkanoic even-over-odd and n-alkane odd-over-even (top and bottom, respectively), carbons, particularly the long chains produced by terrestrial plants for C-13 analysis.

Epicuticular wax has been used as a biomarker to observe human evolution patterns. The lipids of these plant waxes have been analyzed when extracted from ocean and lake cores, paleo-lake drilling projects, archeological and geological outcrops, cave deposits, and human-bearing sediments. This data provides insight into past plant ecology and environmental stresses, particularly by reconstructing landscapes at a high taxonomic resolution.

Epicuticular wax δ^{13}C is a favorable biomarker due to its benefits: it is not biased towards feeding like tooth enamel biomarkers, and are more widespread than paleosol carbonates that are biased based on rainfall amount. This marker can also identify C_{3} and C_{4} photosynthetic pathways. Biosynthesis of these lipids result in further fractionation that results in lighter the bulk δ^{13}C. Isotope stability studies that characterize diagenetic process can identify carbon and hydrogen alteration through chemical and microbial activity, but these studies often have mixed results. The state of plant wax preservation in soils and sediments is still unknown due to complex interactions in the depositional environments, including pH, microbial communities, alkalinity, temperature, and oxygen/moisture content.

δ^{13}C of higher order plants has been used at Holocene and Pleistocene archeological sites. Diverse environments in modern Africa have been analyzed through the interpretation of epicuticular wax proxies, from wooded grassland vegetation (where the C_{31} homolog is most abundant) to arid and semi-arid regions of southern Africa (characterized by an abundance of C_{29}). Turkana paleo-lake sediments from the East (3.45–3.4 Ma Wargolo Formation) and the West (1.9–1.4 Ma Nachukui Formation) suggest precession-controlled summer insolation is the primary driver of Pliocene and Pleistocene hydrology in the Basin. Variance of δD and δ^{13}C at certain dates coincide with changes in variables such as orbital eccentricity and hominid tools.

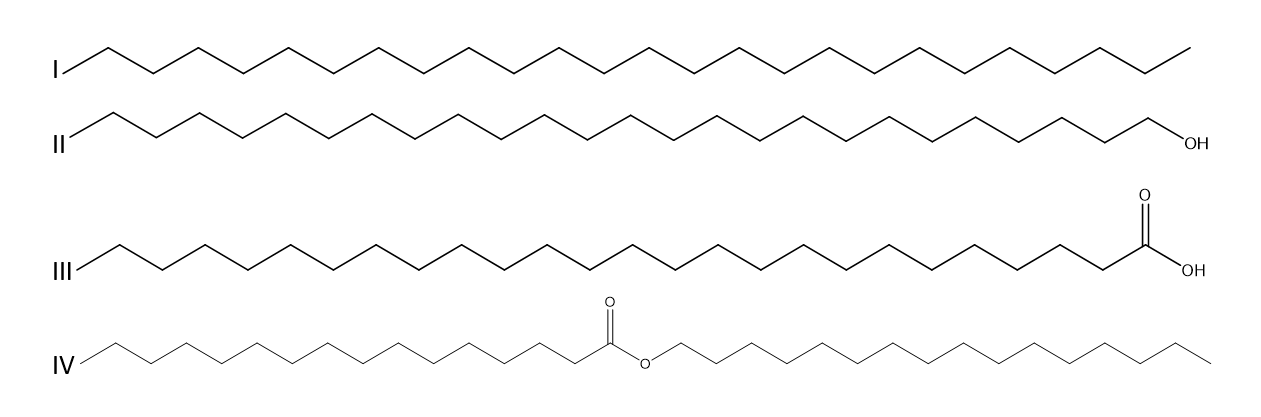
Chemical compounds of the four most abundant n-alkyl compounds in epicuticular waxes of terrestrial waxes, with I being n-alkane, II n-alkanol, III n-alkanoic acid, and IV wax ester.

Epicuticular wax and its successor aliphatic compounds are also used as biomarkers for higher plants. Long-chain n-alkyl compounds from vascular plants leaves are major components of epicuticular waxes that are resistant to degradation and thus effective biomarkers for higher plants. These terrestrial biomarkers can also be present in marine sediments. Due to the lack of higher plant material in aqueous settings, the presence of higher plant biomarkers in these ecosystems infer that these biomarkers were transported from their original terrestrial environment. Carbon isotopic compositions, specifically, their δ^{13}C value, reflect their metabolism and environment, as ^{13}C is discriminated against during photosynthesis.

== See also ==
- Wax
- Plant cuticle
- Glaucous

== Bibliography ==
- Eigenbrode, S. D. (1996). "Plant surface waxes and insect behaviour". In Kerstiens, G. (ed.). Plant Cuticles: an integrated functional approach. Oxford: Bios Scientific Publishers. pp. 201–221. ISBN 1-85996-130-4.
