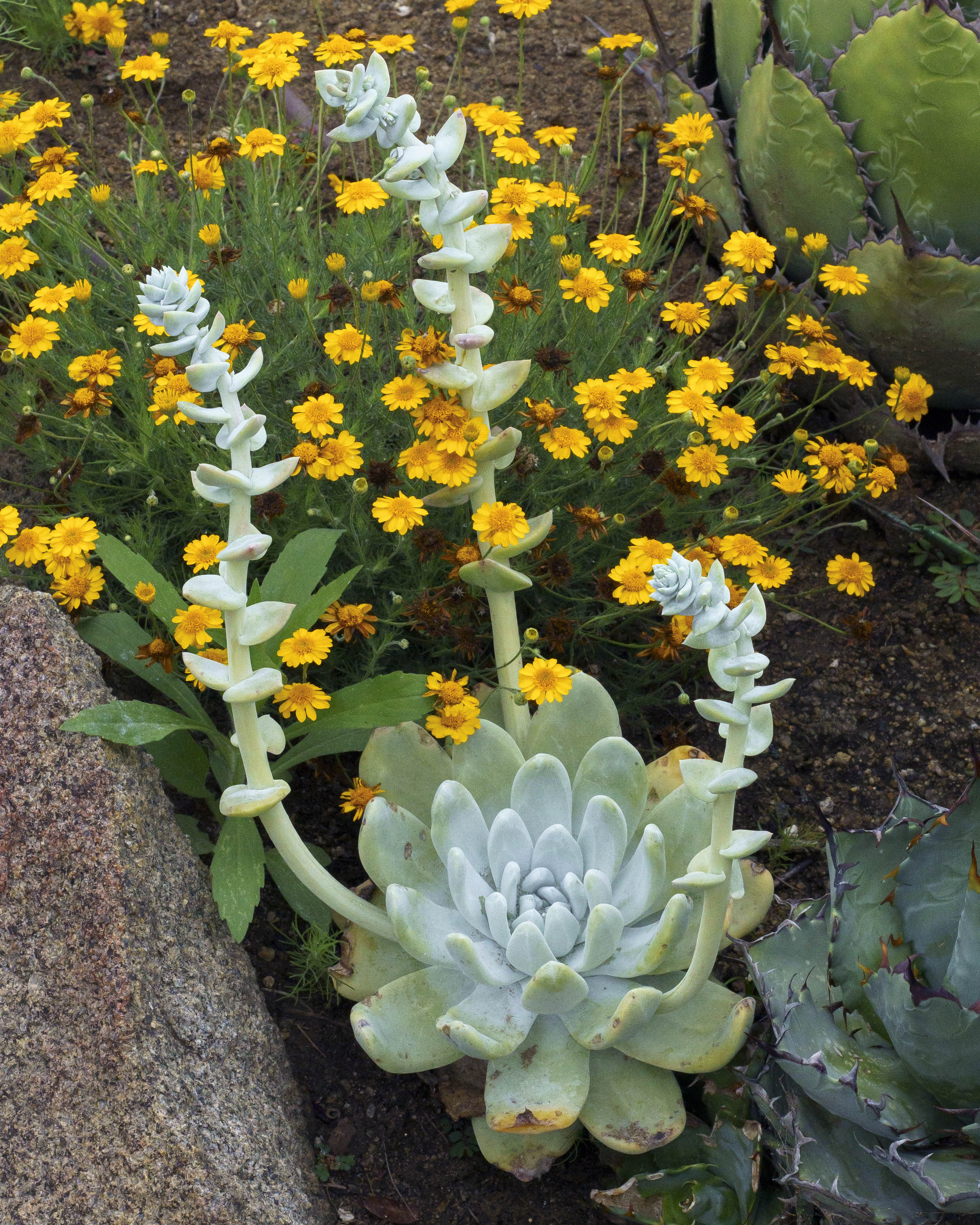
- A cultivated plant with emerging floral stems

Scientific classification
- Kingdom: Plantae
- Clade: Tracheophytes
- Clade: Angiosperms
- Clade: Eudicots
- Order: Saxifragales
- Family: Crassulaceae
- Genus: Dudleya
- Species: D. pachyphytum

Binomial name
- Dudleya pachyphytum Moran & M.Benedict

= Dudleya pachyphytum =

Species of succulent plant from Mexico

Dudleya pachyphytum is an insular succulent plant known by the common name Cedros Island liveforever. It is a member of the genus Dudleya, in the family Crassulaceae. Characterized by thick, blunt leaves covered in a white, powdery wax and adorned by white flowers in bloom, it is regarded as one of the most attractive and charismatic members of its genus. It is endemic to the foggy northern end of Mexico's Cedros Island, occupying an ecological niche shared with the Cedros Island Pine.

The plant is endangered due to poaching from organized criminals supplying succulent collectors, many of whom are located in Asia. The poachers include South Korean nationals and criminal gangs operating under the Mexican cartels. The demand from succulent collectors has led to overexploitation of the plant in the wild, and armed confrontations between competing poachers has contributed to several killings.

== Description ==
This plant is characterized by its distinctive appearance that stands in stark contrast to other Dudleya, as it has extremely thick, blunt, turgid leaves and a pale, desaturated inflorescence. The leaves of this species are the thickest in the genus, making it easily recognizable among the other members. It bears resemblance in the rosette, epicuticular wax and thick leaves to other maritime Dudleya, like D. caespitosa of the central Californian coast, D. candida of the Coronado Islands, and D. farinosa of the northern coast of California, and D. greenei of the Channel Islands.

=== Vegetative morphology ===
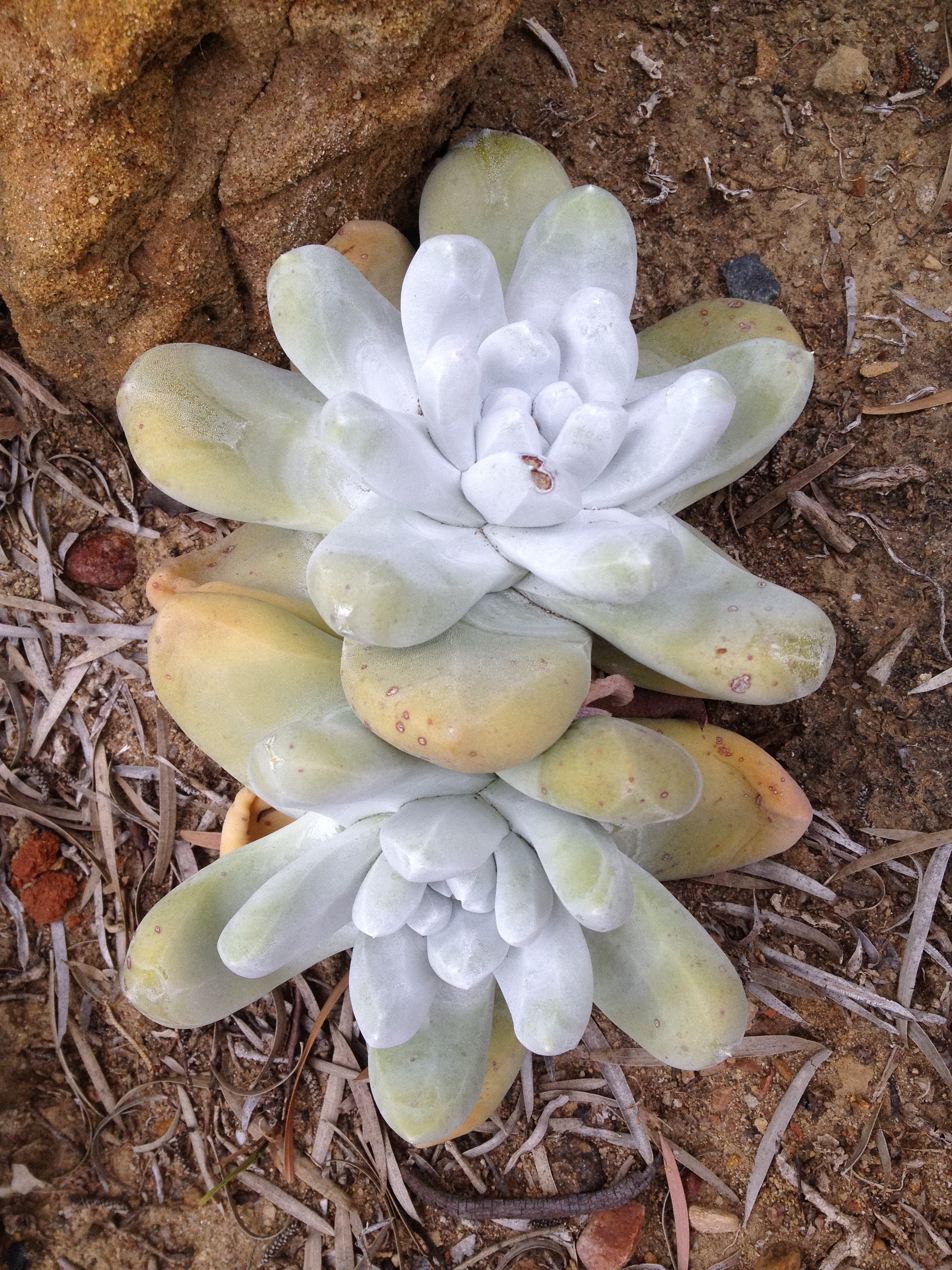
An image of the characteristic rosettes of Dudleya pachyphytum in the garden.

Dudleya pachyphytum plants can be up to 7 decimeters (dm) wide, with 10 to 50 clusters of rosettes. Caudices are 4 dm or more long, decumbent in age, and 2 to 5 centimeters thick. Dead and dry leaves around 10 cm thick clothe the caudex.

Rosettes are compact, 12 to 22 cm wide, with 12 to 25 leaves but up to 55 in cultivated specimens. Leaves are farinose, thick and turgid, ovate to oblong and broadest near the base, rounded to broadly obtuse, and apiculate. The dimensions of the leaf are 5 to 10 cm long, 3 to 5 cm wide, and 1.5 to 2.5 cm thick. Ventrally, the leaves are flattish, with prominent low ridges corresponding to the edges of adjacent leaves in bud. Dorsally, the leaves are rounded and asymmetrically low-keeled, with the margins obtuse near the base to rounded above.

=== Reproductive morphology ===
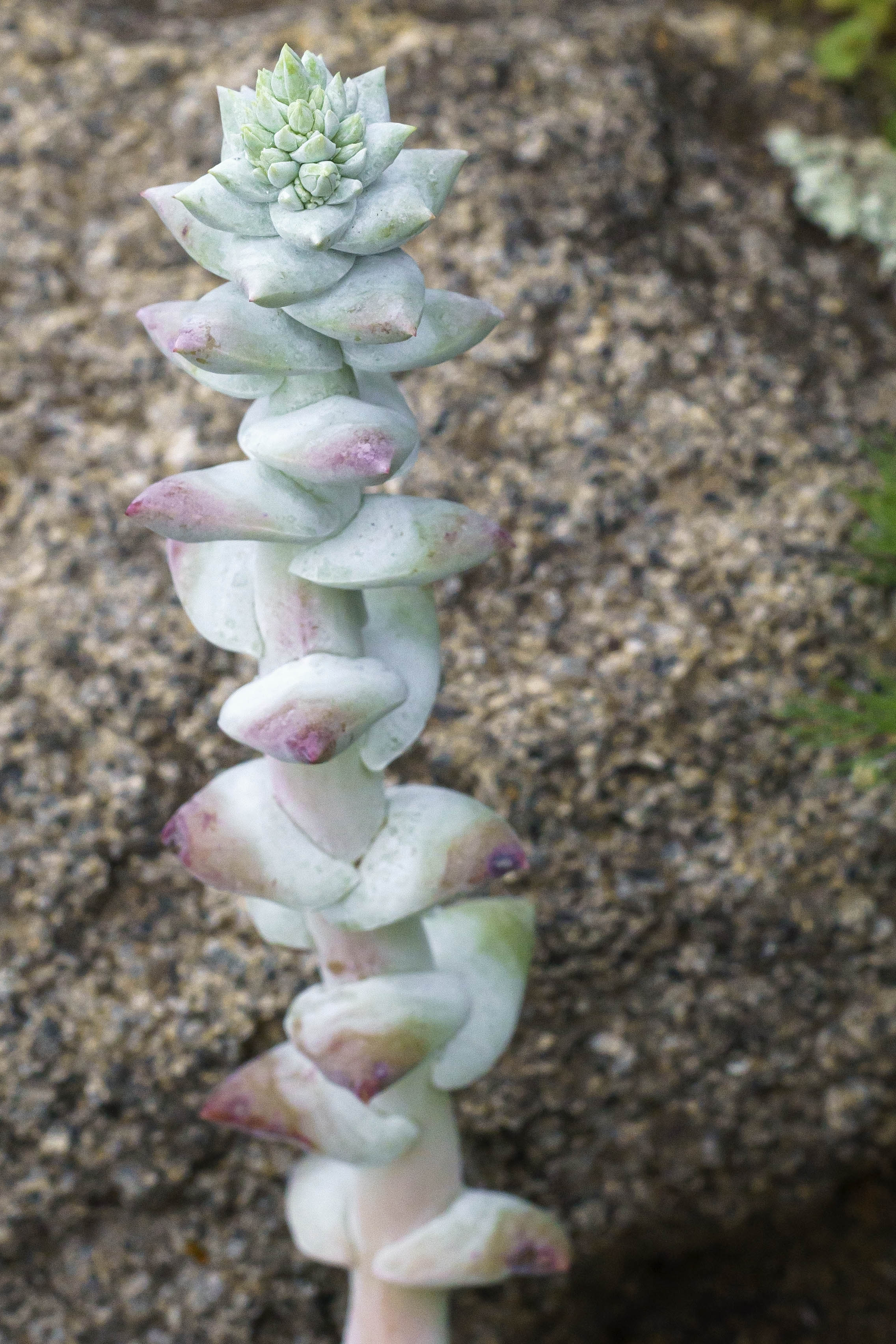
The nascent inflorescence of Dudleya pachyphytum.

Floral stems are erect or spreading, 2 to 5 dm long, 5 to 15 mm thick to 18 mm wide at the base, farinose, and colored a pale pink that becomes red lower on. 20 to 35 bracts are present on the floral stem. The bracts are cordate-ovate, clasping, and broadly acute, about 1 to 2.5 cm long and wide, and 3 to 13 mm thick.

The inflorescence is cernuous in bud, but it later becomes erect and rather dense. Inflorescence is 8 to 14 cm wide, with 3 to 6 close-set bifurcate (Note: In botanical terms, bifurcation means having two branches or divisions arise from a common point. One example would be the prongs of a fork.) branches. The cincinnus is circinate (unfurling like a fern's frond, see circinate vernation), with 5 to 12 flowers. The pedicels are erect, about 2 to 6 mm long, and 1 to 2.5 mm thick at the base, thickening upward.

On the flower, the calyx is rounded below, 5 to 9 mm long, and 4.5 to 7 mm wide, with appressed segments. Calyx segments are triangular-lanceolate, acute, and 4 to 7 mm long, 2.5 to 4 mm wide. Corolla is white, 8 to 11 mm long, 4 to 5 mm thick, with the petals connate 2 to 3 mm and erect with the tips slightly outcurved, elliptic to oblong, acute, 2 to 3mm wide. Inside the flower, the filaments are white. Epipetalous stamens are 5 to 8 mm long, whilst the antesepalous stamens are 6.5 to 9 mm long. Before dehiscence, anthers are red, 1.2 to 1.4 mm long. The nectaries are white and 0.9 to 1.2 mm wide. Gynoecium is 7 to 10 mm high, 2 to 3 mm thick, with the pistils erect, appressed, and connate around 2 mm ventrally, tapering into styles about 1.5 to 2mm long. There are 25 to 45 ovules, 0.4 to 0.5 mm long.

Seeds are about 0.6 mm long, with around 15 longitudinal striations.

== Taxonomy ==
=== Taxonomic history ===
Dudleya pachyphytum was discovered by Michael Benedict, a research associate at the Santa Barbara Botanic Garden, during a trip to Cedros Island in 1971. Benedict found an uprooted rosette in a ravine known as Cañada de la Mina, (Note: Named after a copper mine established on Cedros Island by an American, George P. Brown.) near the Punta Norte lighthouse on the northern end of the island. Presumably, the rosette had tumbled down the cliffs and into the ravine, where Benedict found it. Excited about his new discovery, Benedict hiked about attempting to find another plant, but his efforts were fruitless.

Benedict returned in 1977, bringing some back to flower in Santa Barbara. Towards the end of the decade, natural history tours of Cedros Island, particularly in the northern half, brought more attention to this then undescribed species. The unknown species was further propelled into the limelight after Alfred B. Lau of the Cactus and Succulent Society of America returned with colored pictures and analysis of the species. Finally, after the suggestion of Lau, Benedict, Reid Moran, and their colleagues returned to Cedros Island in 1980, describing and publishing the species Dudleya pachyphytum in Phytologia. This plant was named pachyphytum owing to the resemblance of its thick leaves to another genus in the stonecrop family, Pachyphytum, also native to Mexico.

=== Phylogeny ===
Phylogenetic analysis of the genus Dudleya places D. pachyphytum in a clade with D. linearis, the San Benito Islands liveforever, a relative that is endemic to the San Benito Islands, and D. brittonii, Britton's liveforever, endemic to the northern coastal cliffs of Baja California.

== Distribution, habitat and ecology ==
=== Distribution ===
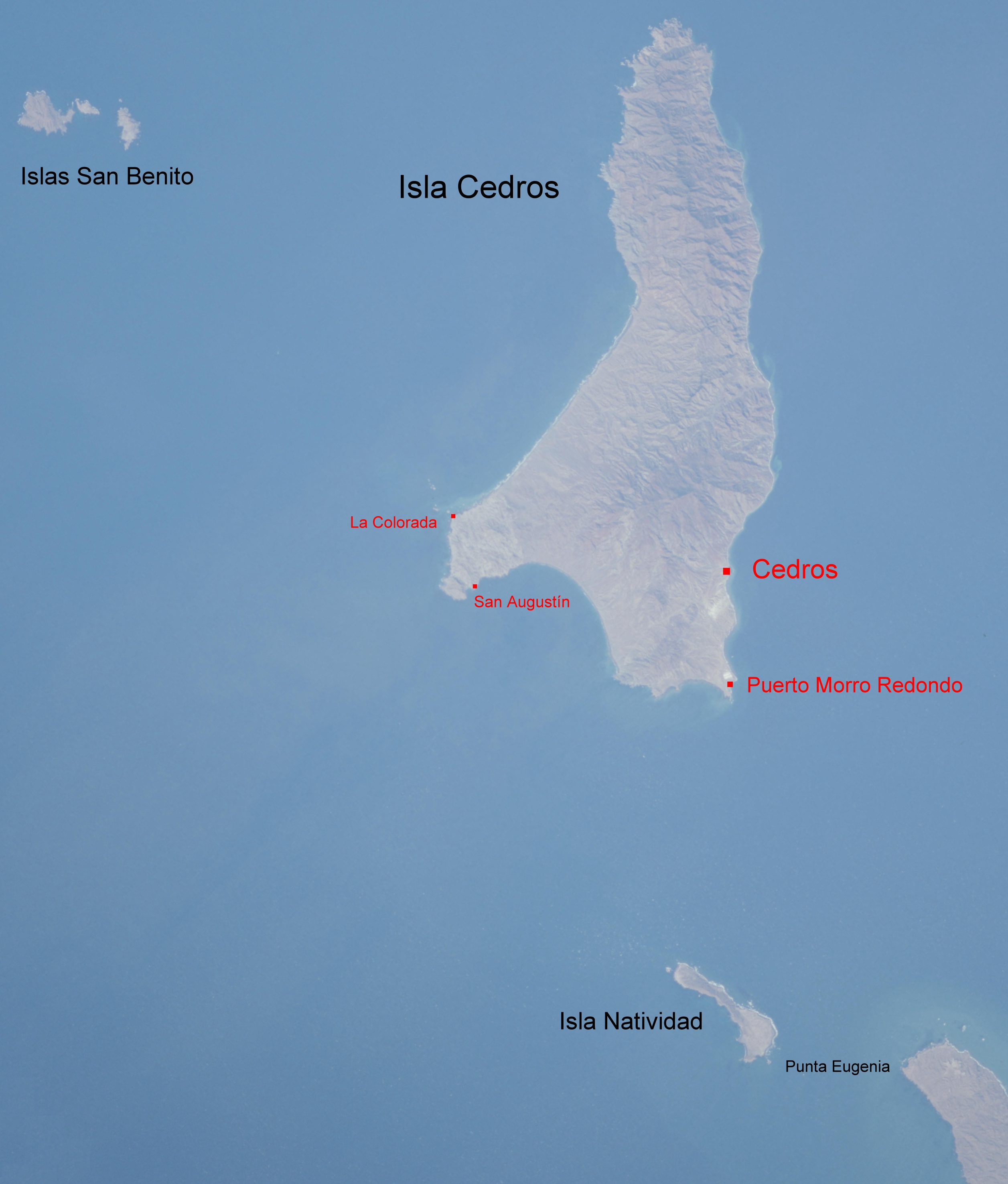
Cedros Island and surrounding geographical features.

Dudleya pachyphytum exists on the northern end of Cedros Island, the largest of the Baja California's islands on the Pacific coast. In the fog zone, near groves of Pinus radiata, it occurs at an elevation about 100 to 500 m (328 to 984 ft), often with north to northwest-facing exposure. From the Punta Norte, its distribution continues at least 3 km south on the western flank of the island, down to 100 m (328 ft). The southern limit on the species is near the ridges of Cañada de la Mina, and explorations by botanists indicate that the species is probably expanding southwards. It coexists on the island with other species of Dudleya, including D. acuminata, D. albiflora, and D. cochimiana.

=== Habitat ===
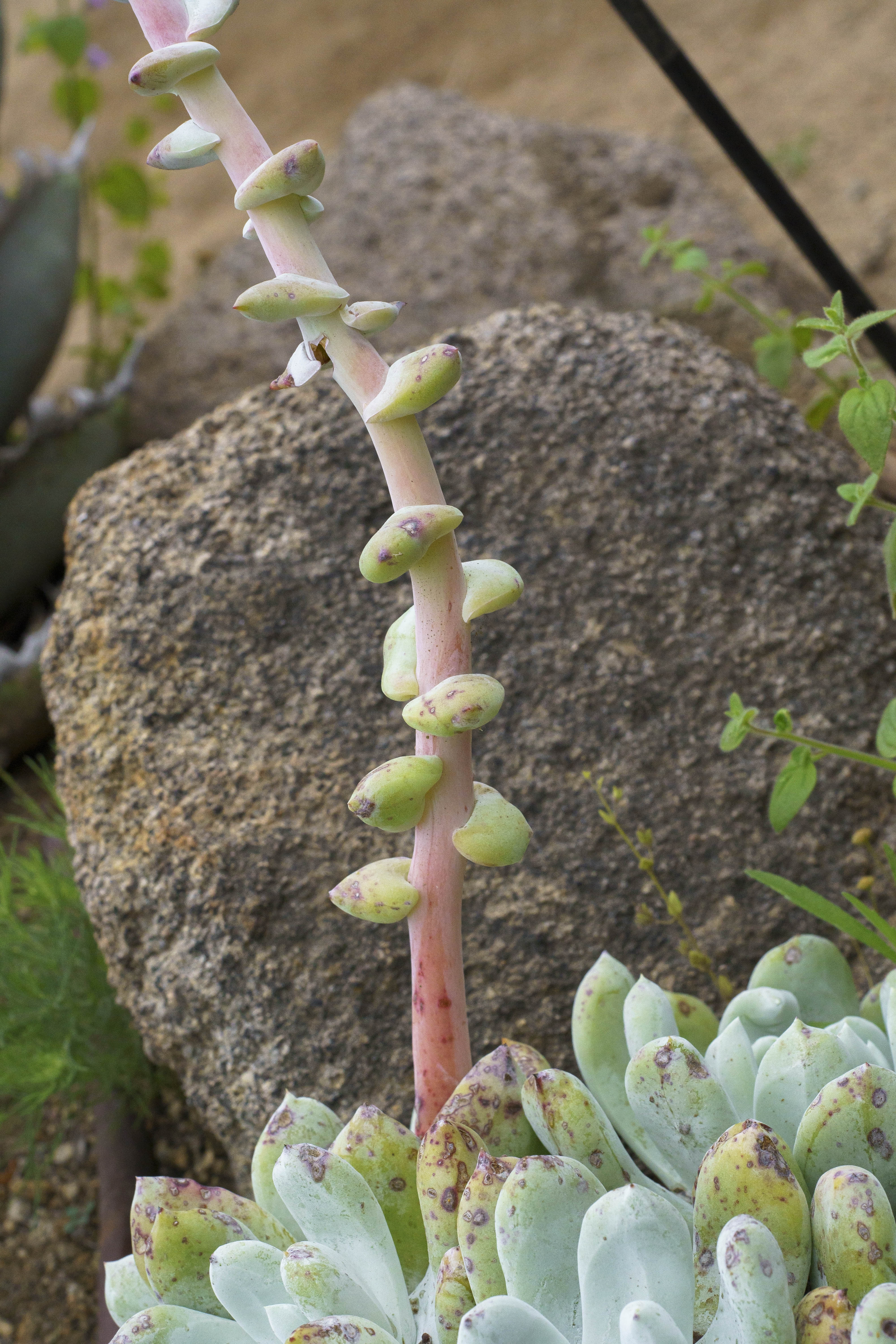
Detail of the bracts on the developing floral stems and some of the rosette leaves of Dudleya pachyphytum.

The succulent occupies an ecological niche at the northern end of Cedros Island, where the predominantly arid foliage gives away to pines, lichen, and D. pachyphytum, fed by the moisture brought by the marine fog. The seaward slopes are often so saturated by cool marine winds that the temperature often remains close to the dew point. It is primarily an occupant of rocky slopes and cliffs, albeit occasional specimens grow in the duff of the pine forest, and those that do often grow vigorously, with 5 to 10 seedlings emerging from the clearings in the forest floor. Below the pine forest, in the sea cliffs and weathered slopes, among the scree of frequent rockfall, D. pachyphytum forms an association with Bahiopsis lanata, a member of the family Asteraceae. As noted by one of the describers of the species, Reid Moran, one of the reasons D. pachyphytum may be so successful on the talus slopes is because of their ability to roll in the event of disturbance, eventually re-rooting after they land in a suitable position.

Analysis of the vegetation communities on Cedros Island places D. pachyphytum in its own community, the Northern Bluff Succulent Community, wherein D. pachyphytum makes up 15 to 20% of the plant cover.

Associated species of the Northern Bluff Succulent Community

- Ambrosia camphorata (Greene) Payne
- Agave sebastiana Greene
- Bahiopsis lanata Kellogg
- Dudleya acuminata Rose ex Britton & Rose
- Dudleya albiflora Rose ex Britton & Rose
- Eriogonum molle Greene
- Frankenia palmeri S. Watson

=== Pests and diseases ===
Several animals feed on D. pachyphytum. Larvae of the Sonoran blue butterfly feed on the inflorescence, and many of the developing floral stems are presumably eaten by the Cedros Island black-tailed deer.

== Conservation and poaching ==
Although in the late 20th century the population of Dudleya pachyphytum was thought to be growing, as the range was expanding towards the south, anthropogenic factors, primarily owing to poaching and demand from foreign succulent collectors, have been detrimental for the future of the plant. Since Alfred B. Lau's pictures of the plant appeared in the Cactus and Succulent Journal of America in the 1980s, poachers have been stealing the plant from Cedros Island and botanical gardens, including one of the original collections from before the species description. However, the scale of poaching has drastically increased in the 20th century to an unprecedented level.

One plant grown for six years in Santa Barbara had a rosette of about 55 leaves—when a thief interrupted the study.

— Reid Moran and Michael Benedict, in reference to the theft of a plant used for research,

Accessing the habitat D. pachyphytum grows in is difficult, as the northern part of the island consists of steep, narrow mountains with peaks up to 3,400 ft (1,000 m) high, with the slopes covered in spiny cacti and agaves. In addition to accessing the island in the first place, once at the northern part of the island, it takes a 2 mi (3.2 km) hike with an elevation gain of 2,000 ft (610 m) in a landscape with no trails just to reach the plants. To circumvent this difficulty, it has been reported that poachers have utilized a helicopter to land on a ridge and take the plants.

Owing to the difficulty of collecting this plant in the wild, combined with crackdowns on its poaching by the Mexican government, some poachers have instead focused on stealing a related plant, Dudleya farinosa, native to the west coast of the United States, labeled by Dudleya expert and botanist Stephen W. McCabe as "a poor man's pachyphytum." Although D. farinosa is much more widespread, the level of poaching can devastate local populations.

Demand for D. pachyphytum is primarily motivated by international consumers, often succulent collectors and enthusiasts, mostly based in East Asia, particularly South Korea and China. In 2016, South Korean nationals began moving to Bahía Tortugas, on the coast of Baja California Sur, to facilitate the poaching of the plants via a network of paid operatives.

It is listed as a threatened species by SEMARNAT.

=== 2017 seizure of Dudleya pachyphytum in Baja California ===
In 2017, Mexican authorities from the Secretariat of National Defense (SEDENA), and the Federal Attorney for Environmental Protection (PROFEPA) stopped a theft of nearly 4,756 rosettes of D. pachyphytum. At a military checkpoint "Chula Vista" in the vicinity of the Baja California and Baja California Sur border, members of the SEDENA discovered a 55-ft long Freightliner tractor trailer loaded with 64 boxes of the poached succulent. 3 South Korean nationals and 1 Mexican national were apprehended. The succulents were discovered in poor condition, and were moved to the mainland to be rehabilitated.

=== 2018 seizure of Dudleya pachyphytum in La Paz ===
In June 2018, customs officials at La Paz International Airport discovered 30 boxes of D. pachyphytum being shipped to Cuautla, Morelos. 493 specimens of the plant were destined to be shipped to a nursery in Morelos, from which they were allegedly to be sold in South Korea.

=== 2018 murders of Bahía Tortugas fishermen ===
In November 2018, seven fishermen from Bahía Tortugas in Baja California Sur were reported missing, after a trip to Cedros Island, 36 mi (58 km) away. The Mexican Navy initiated a search and rescue operation after the Mulegé delegate relayed the case of the missing fishermen, sending a patrol and a King Air 350 surveillance aircraft. Soon after, a member of the Guardia Estatal de Seguridad e Investigación of Baja California discovered the injured 29 year-old Cristóbal Emmanuel Arce Carranza, with gunshot wounds to his arms, who stated he had arrived at Punta Norte to poach D. pachyphytum for sale in the Asian market. That same day, one of the fishermen, Antonio Herrera, was discovered unharmed, stating that the group had been attacked by armed, hooded men. Within a few hours, the body of the next victim, Fidencio Aguilar Espinoza, was discovered with gunshot wounds to the back and head.

On December 5, two of the lost fishermen were rescued. Six days later, the corpse of the final member of the group, 32 year-old Iván Josué García Guzmán, was discovered in an advanced state of decomposition with his hands tied. The status of the seventh fisherman remained unknown.

Some of the fishermen had links to members of criminal gangs operating in the area, and coupled with the fact that Cedros Island serves as a strategic link for transporting narcotics to the United States, investigators suspect the involvement of the Arellano-Félix Cartel, the Sinaloa Cartel, and possibly the Jalisco New Generation Cartel. The commander of the Second Naval Region, Admiral Jorge Luis Cruz Ballado, concluded that the deaths were not the result of a shipwreck, but of an attack of the men collecting the plant by armed assailants. The assailants were likely a cell of the Sinaloa Cartel known as "Los Venados," who targeted the fishermen owing to their links to an antagonistic group "Los Querreques."

== See also ==
Other maritime Dudleya species:

- Dudleya caespitosa
- Dudleya campanulata
- Dudleya candida

Dudleya of Cedros Island:

- Dudleya albiflora
- Dudleya cedrosensis
- Dudleya acuminata
