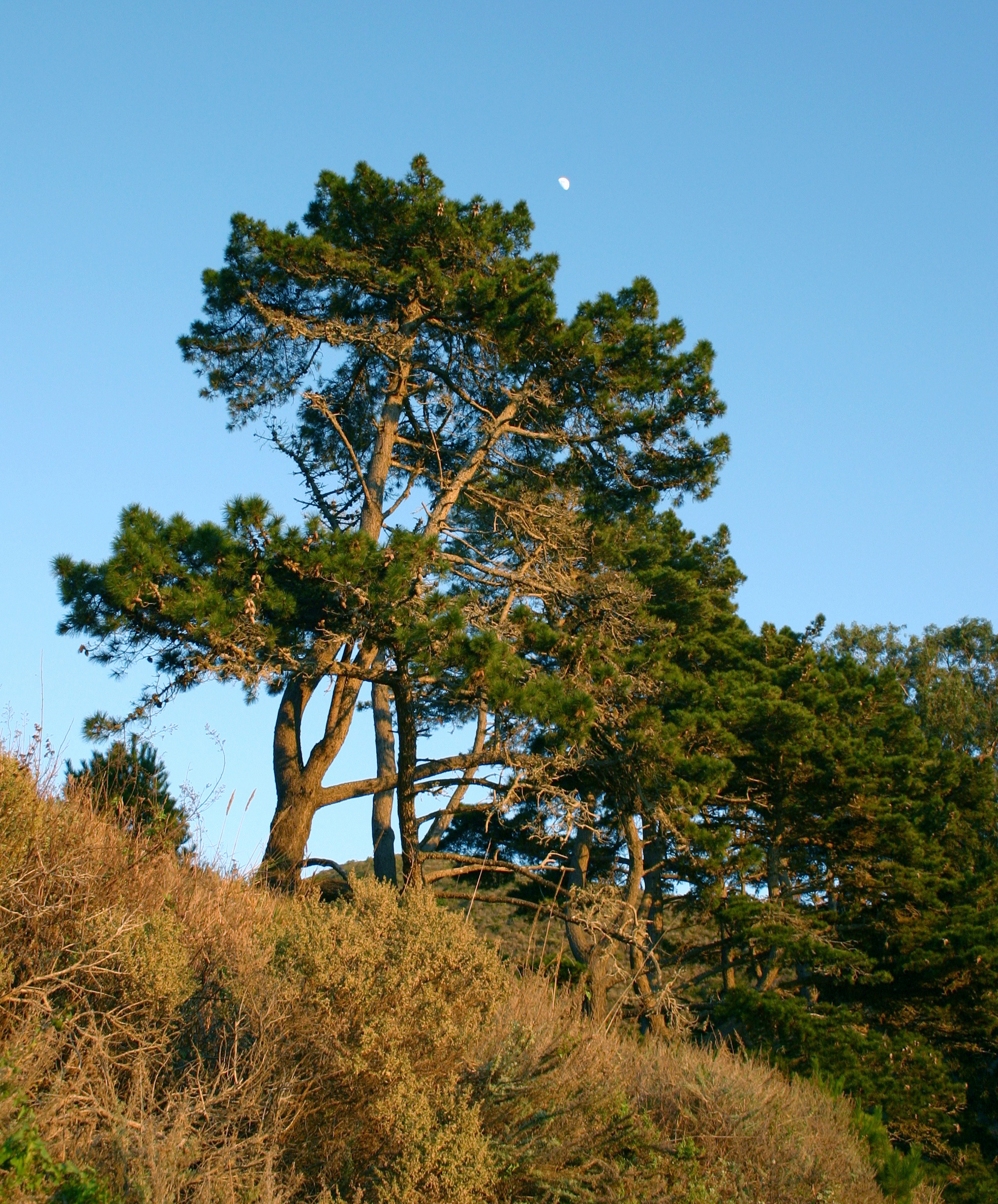

Conservation status
- Endangered (IUCN 3.1)

- Critically Imperiled (NatureServe)

Scientific classification
- Kingdom: Plantae
- Clade: Tracheophytes
- Clade: Gymnosperms
- Division: Pinophyta
- Class: Pinopsida
- Order: Pinales
- Family: Pinaceae
- Genus: Pinus
- Subgenus: P. subg. Pinus
- Section: P. sect. Trifoliae
- Subsection: P. subsect. Australes
- Species: P. radiata

Binomial name
- Pinus radiata D.Don
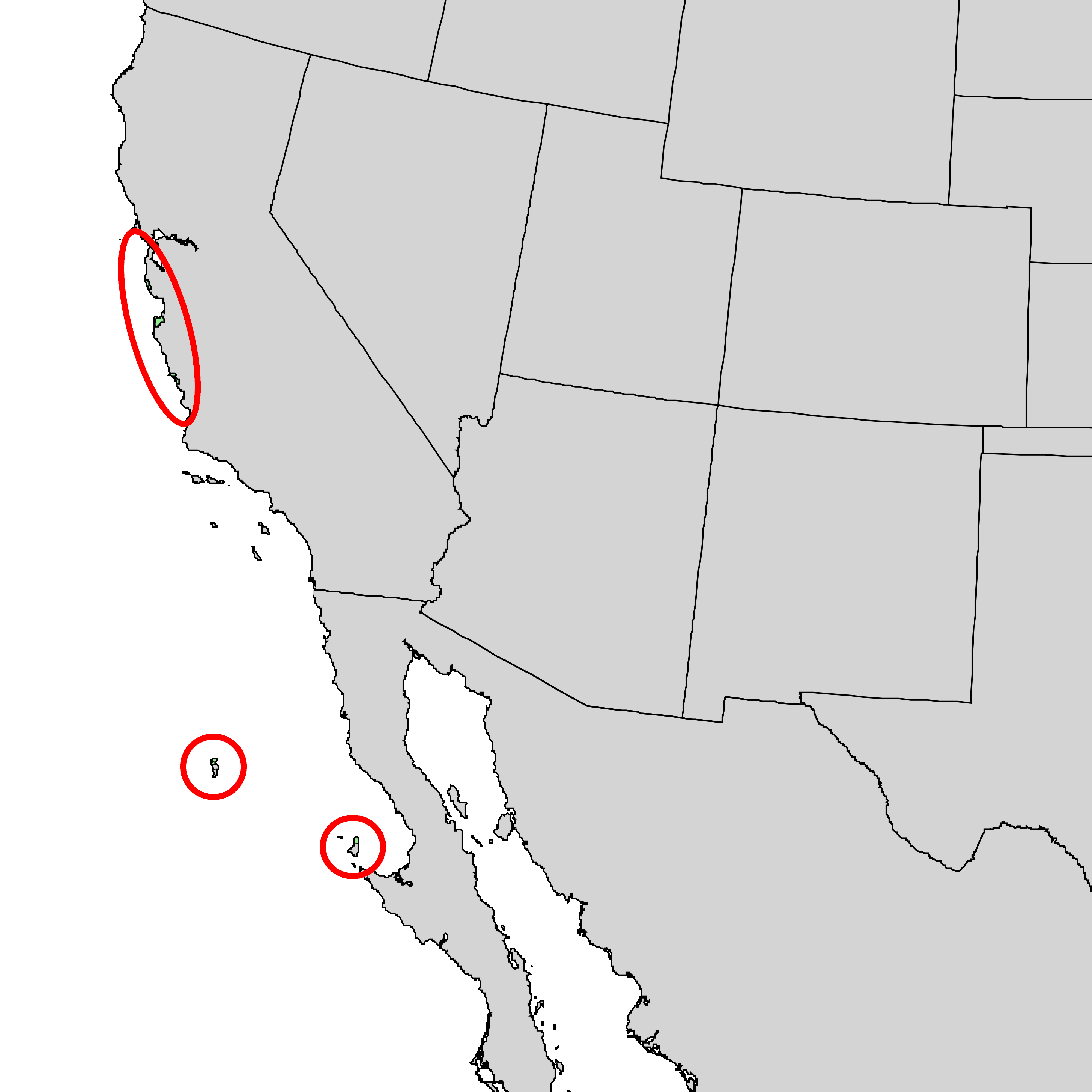
- Natural range of Pinus radiata

= Pinus radiata =

Species of conifer

Pinus radiata (syn. Pinus insignis), the Monterey pine, insignis pine or radiata pine, is a species of conifer in the family Pinaceae, a pine native to the Central Coast of California, and the Guadalupe and Cedros islands of Mexico.

Pinus radiata is a versatile, fast-growing, medium-density softwood, suitable for a wide range of uses and valued for rapid growth (up to two meters (6.5 feet) in one year), as well as desirable lumber and pulp qualities. Its silviculture reflects a century of research, observation and practice. It is often considered a model for growers of other plantation species.

Although P. radiata is extensively cultivated as a plantation timber in many temperate parts of the world, it faces serious threats in its natural range, due to the introduction of a fungal parasite, the pine pitch canker (Fusarium circinatum). The pine shoot moth Rhyacionia buoliana is another serious problem. In cultivation in New Zealand, Pinus radiata has grown as much as 61 m (200 ft) in 41 years, an average of 1.5 m (4 ft 11 in) per year.

== Description ==
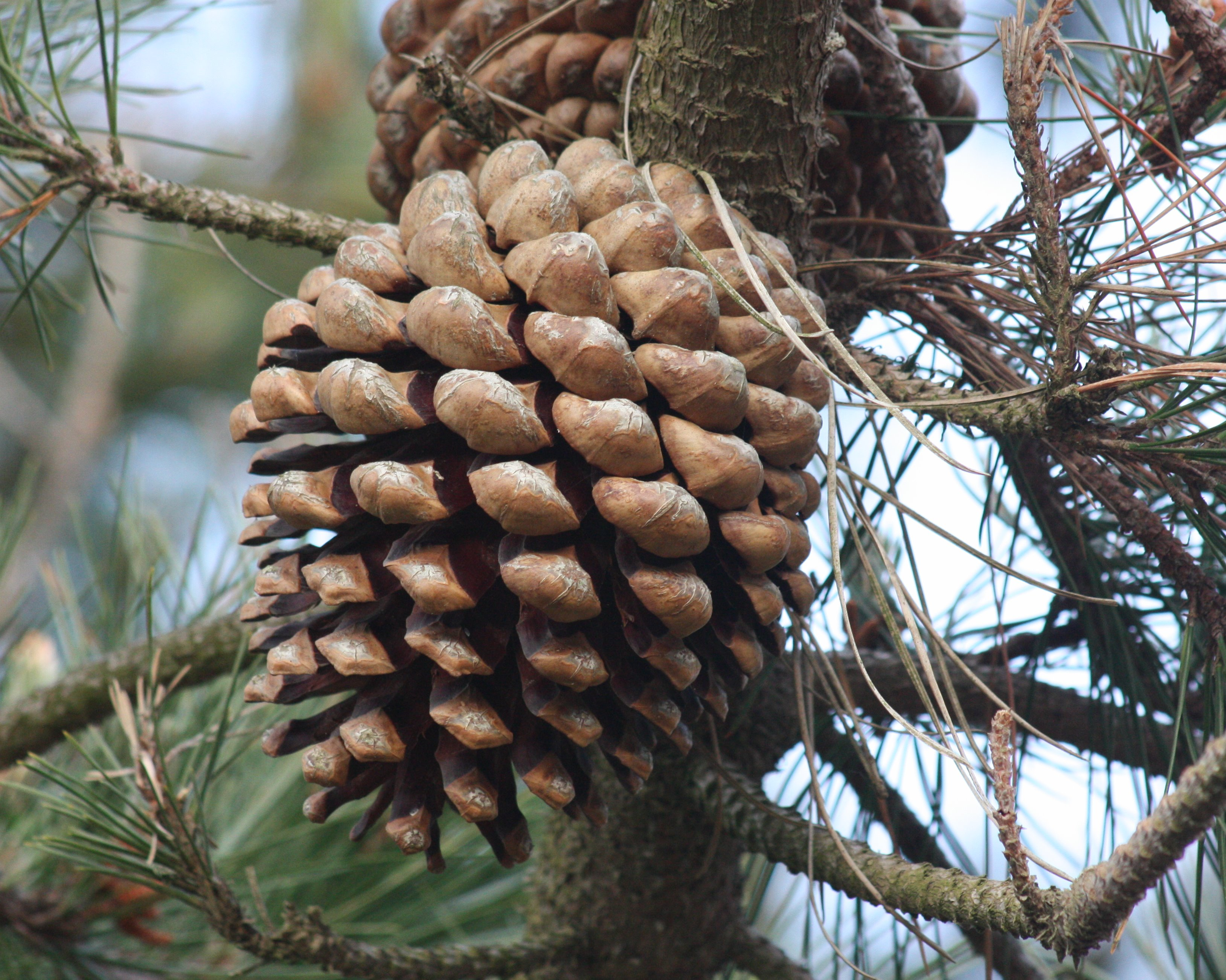
Ovulate cone

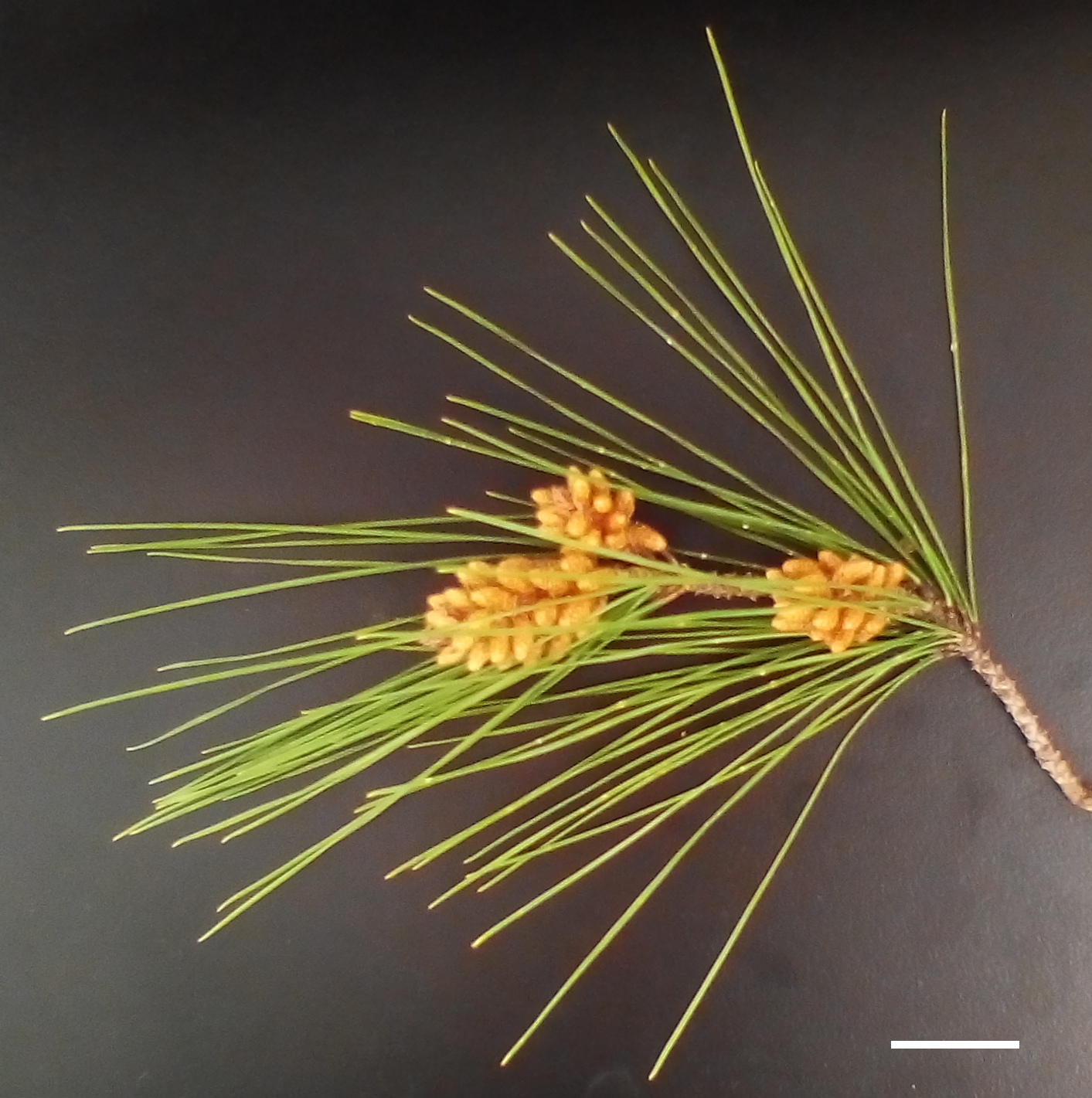
Pollen cones, 2 cm scale bar

Pinus radiata is a coniferous tree growing to 15–30 m (50–100 ft) tall in the wild, but up to 60 m (200 ft) in cultivation in optimum conditions, with upward pointing branches and a rounded top. The leaves ("needles") are bright green, in clusters of three (two in var. binata), slender, 8–15 cm (3–6 in) long and with a blunt tip. The ovulate cones are 7–17 cm (3–6 1/2 in) long, brown, ovoid (egg-shaped), and usually set asymmetrically on a branch, attached at an oblique angle. The bark is fissured and dark gray to brown. When not cut short by disease or harvesting, it has a lifespan of 80 to 90 years.

The specific epithet radiata refers to the cracks which radiate from the umbo of the cone scales.

It is closely related to bishop pine and knobcone pine, hybridizing readily with both species; it is distinguished from the former by needles in threes (not pairs), and from both by the cones not having a sharp spine on the scales.

The modern plantation tree is vastly different from the native tree of Monterey. In plantations the tree is commonly planted at 4 square meter spacing on a wide variety of landscapes from flat to moderately steep hills. Because of selective breeding and more recently the extensive use of growth factor seedlings, forests planted since the 1990s have very straight tall trunks without the problem of twin leaders. The trees are pruned in three lifts so that the lower two-thirds of a mature tree is free of branches and hence of knots.

== Distribution and habitat ==
In the United States, it is native to three very limited areas located in Santa Cruz, Monterey, and San Luis Obispo Counties of California.

In Mexico, it is found on two islands in the Pacific Ocean, Guadalupe Island and Cedros Island.

On Guadalupe Island, located 280 km (150 nmi) off the mainland coast, the pines are found on the steep northern end of the island, at elevations of around 500 to 1,200 m (1,600 to 3,900 ft), where they follow the ridgetops and steep slopes. Edward Palmer and Francescho Franceschi were the first to discover the pines on Guadalupe Island. When Franceschi visited in 1892, he noted that they extended all over the northern and northwestern part of the island, comprising a very thick forest, with some of the finest trees growing with the Guadalupe palm.

On Cedros Island, the pines are more abundant, being found in far greater numbers partly due to the lack of feral goats. (Goats were exterminated on Guadalupe island by 2007.) They are found at lower elevations than on Guadalupe, at around 285 to 690 m (935 to 2,264 ft), on the windward ridges and canyons of the north and central parts of the island. In both cases, the pines seem to be heavily dependent on locations with a high frequency of fog.

In Australia, New Zealand, and Spain it is the leading introduced tree and in Argentina, Chile, Uruguay, Kenya, and South Africa it is a major plantation species. It is also an introduced tree on the world's most remote inhabited island, Tristan da Cunha.

== Taxonomy ==
=== Subdivisions ===
Two varieties of this species have been recognized, each corresponding to the island they are endemic to in Baja California. Some authors lump these taxa and do not recognize infraspecies.

On both islands it is the only pine species, and one of the few tree species. Compared to the mainland species, which are mostly three-needled, the insular varieties have their needles in bundles of two. Their cones are also smaller, and they show greater wind resistance in regards to wind-induced toppling.

John Thomas Howell found that in some examples of the pines on Guadalupe Island, vigorous shoots often had needles in threes, similar to typical Pinus radiata. Howell treated the pines on Guadalupe as three separate forms rather than the endemic variety, with forma radiata having very asymmetrical cones, forma guadalupensis with nearly symmetrical cones, and forma binata with intermediate cones, similar to those of the type collection of var. binata collected by Edward Palmer.

The pines of Cedros Island were previously referred to as Pinus muricata, or a variety of that species described by Howell, P. muricata var. cedrosensis. Other botanists, like Herbert L. Mason, instead identified it as Pinus remorata. Later studies, like those conducted by Daniel Axelrod, instead suggested that the pines of Cedros Island belonged to Pinus radiata.

The two island varieties have two to several resin canals on their needles, while the mainland species has zero to two.

- Pinus radiata var. binata (Engelm.) Lemmon — Commonly known as the Guadalupe Island pine. Endemic to Guadalupe Island. The Guadalupe pines are larger than the mainland pines, with example noted by Howell having a 2.71 m (8.9 ft) diameter trunk, greater than the largest diameter trunk recorded on the mainland of 1.83 m (6.0 ft). The mean length of the Guadalupe Island pine's cones is 8.2 cm (3.2 in), which is shorter than the mainland plants (measuring between 9.6 cm (3.8 in) and 13.9 cm (5.5 in), depending on population), but longer than the Cedros Island pine's cones.
- Pinus radiata var. cedrosensis (J.T. Howell) Silba — Commonly known as the Cedros Island pine. Endemic to Cedros Island. The mean length of Cedros Island pine's cones is 6.5 cm (2.6 in), the smallest among all populations.

== Ecology ==
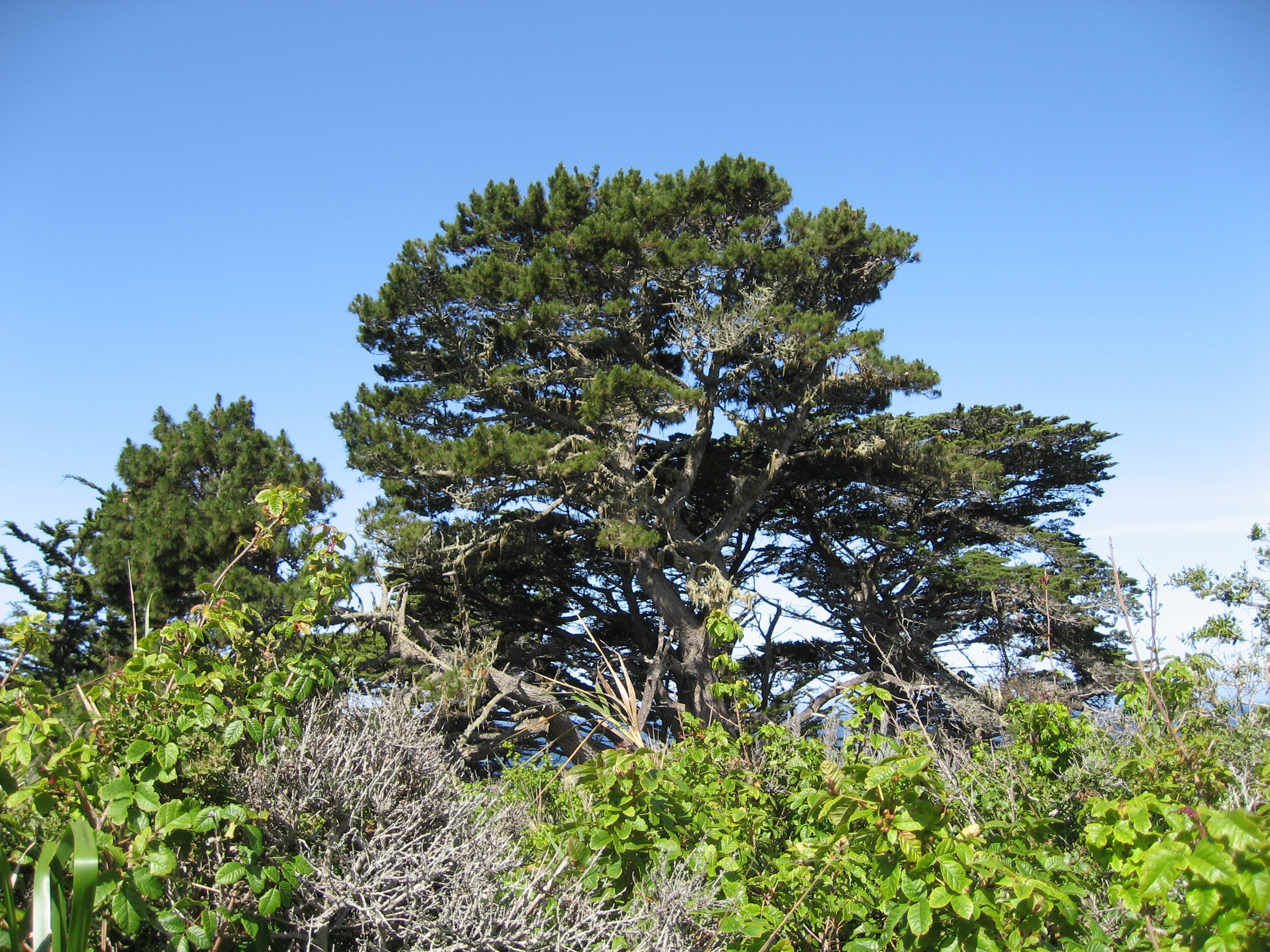
Pinus radiata forest in Point Lobos, California

Pinus radiata is adapted to cope with stand-killing fire disturbance. Its cones are serotinous, i.e. they remain closed until opened by the heat of a forest fire; the abundant seeds are then discharged to regenerate on the burned forest floor. The cones may also burst open in hot weather.

In its native range, P. radiata is associated with characteristic flora and fauna. It is the co-dominant canopy tree, together with Cupressus macrocarpa, which also naturally occurs only in coastal Monterey County. Furthermore, one of the pine forests in Monterey, California, was the discovery site for Hickman's potentilla, an endangered species. Piperia yadonii, a rare species of orchid, is endemic to the same pine forest adjacent to Pebble Beach. In its native range, P. radiata is a principal host for the dwarf mistletoe Arceuthobium littorum.

The habitat of the pines on Cedros Island contrasts greatly with the desert scrub on other parts of the island, forming zones of abrupt transition. The numerous groves form a mostly-monotypic forest of the species, with very few other plants besides seedlings emerging in the understory. In some areas, the edges of the forest form a zone that supports chaparral species, including Malosma laurina, Diplacus stellatus, and the endemic Eriogonum molle. With their large surfaces to condense fog, the pines create irrigation for themselves and their associates. Towards the far northern end of the island, a succulent community mostly consisting of Dudleya is found, and the endemic Dudleya pachyphytum can sometimes be found growing under the pines in the ecotone.

A remnant P. radiata stand in Pacific Grove, the Monarch Grove Sanctuary, is a prime wintering habitat of the monarch butterfly.

In South Africa, the tree is a threat to already scarce water resources. The tree has remarkable roots. Monterey pine roots will reach downward as far as physically permitted by subterranean conditions. Roots have been discovered up to 12 meters (39 ft) long. Efforts to remove large quantities of the non-native tree in areas of South Africa have resulted in significant increases in accessible water.

== Conservation status ==
=== Fungal disease ===
The three remaining wild stands of var. radiata (Monterey pine proper) are infected and under threat of extirpation from pine pitch canker caused by Fusarium circinatum, a fungal disease native to the southeast United States and found (in 1986) to have been introduced to California. When trees decay due to the disease, they attract bark beetles which provide a pathway for infection of other trees. In some stands, 80–90% of trees are infected. If the disease is introduced in agroforestry areas dependent upon P. radiata, such as New Zealand, it could have catastrophic effects in those countries as well.

Sphaeropsis blight (Diplodia pinea) infects P. radiata in California and causes serious damage to plantations of the species in New Zealand, Australia and South Africa, especially after hail damage to growing tips.

=== Baja California ===
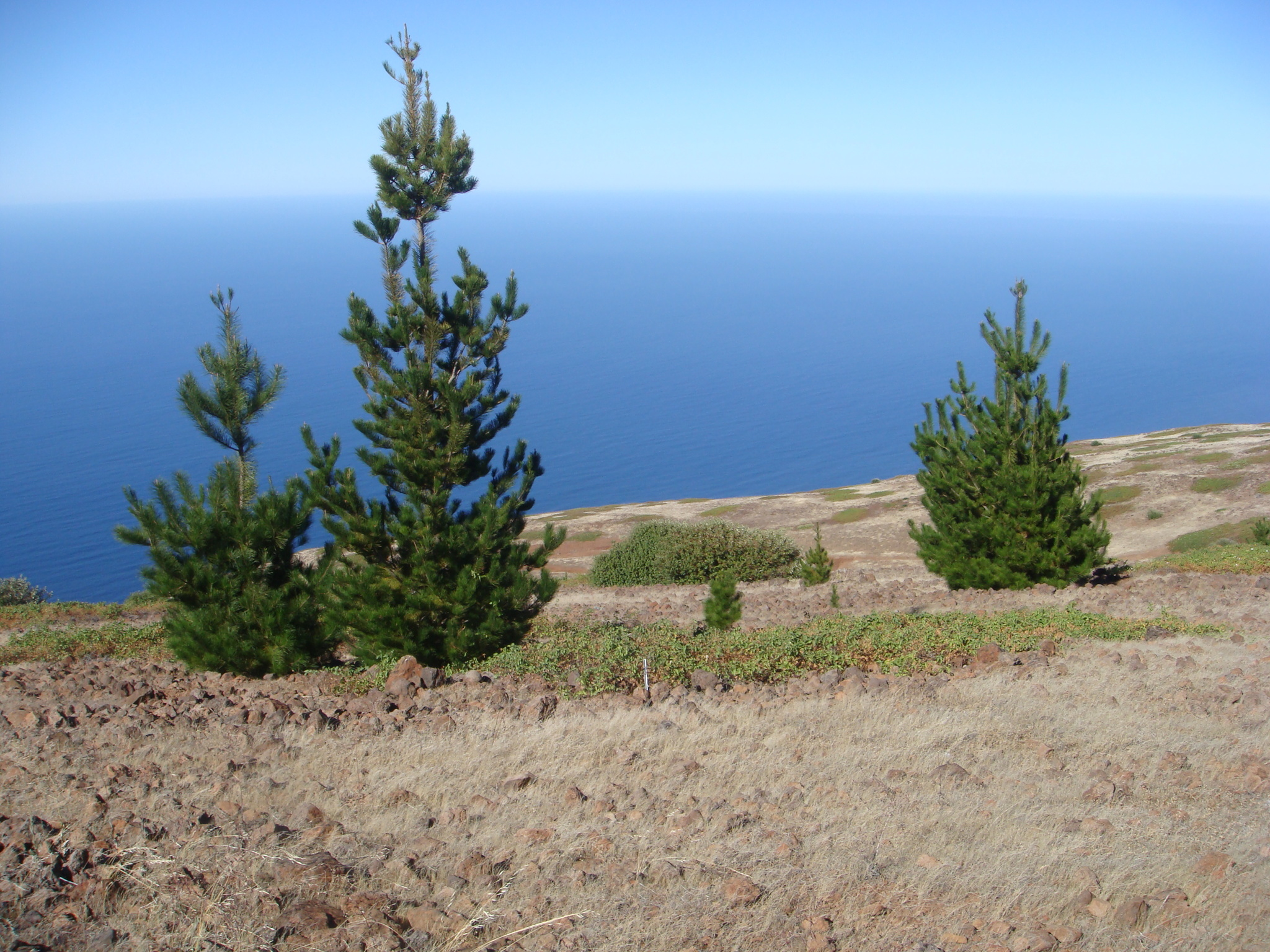
Pinus radiata var. binata

On Guadalupe Island, var. binata is critically endangered. Most of the population was destroyed as tens of thousands of feral goats ate binata seedlings and caused soil erosion from the mid-19th century until just a few years ago. The older trees gradually died off until by 2001–2002 the population stood at only one hundred. With a program to remove the goats essentially complete by 2005, hundreds of young Guadalupe pines have started to grow up in habitat fenced after 2001, the first significant new growth in about 150 years. Possible accidental introduction of pine pitch canker is considered the biggest threat at present to the survival of the Guadalupe Island pine population. The University of California's Russell Reservation forestry research station hosts an orchard planted with 73 P. radiata seedlings from Guadalupe Island and plays an important role in conserving the binata variety.

== Cultivation ==
=== Australia ===
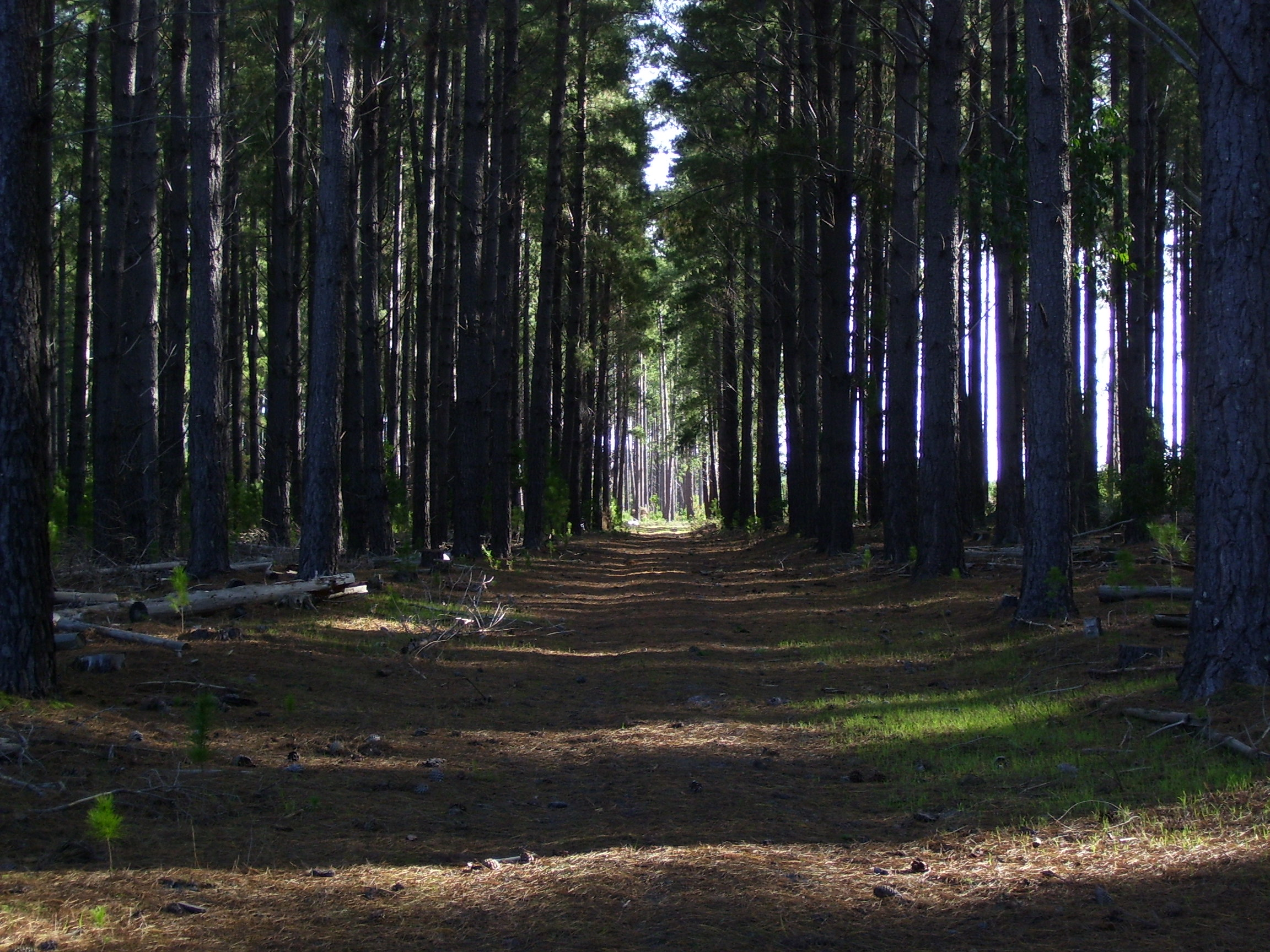
Monterey Pine trees in Kuitpo Forest near Adelaide in South Australia

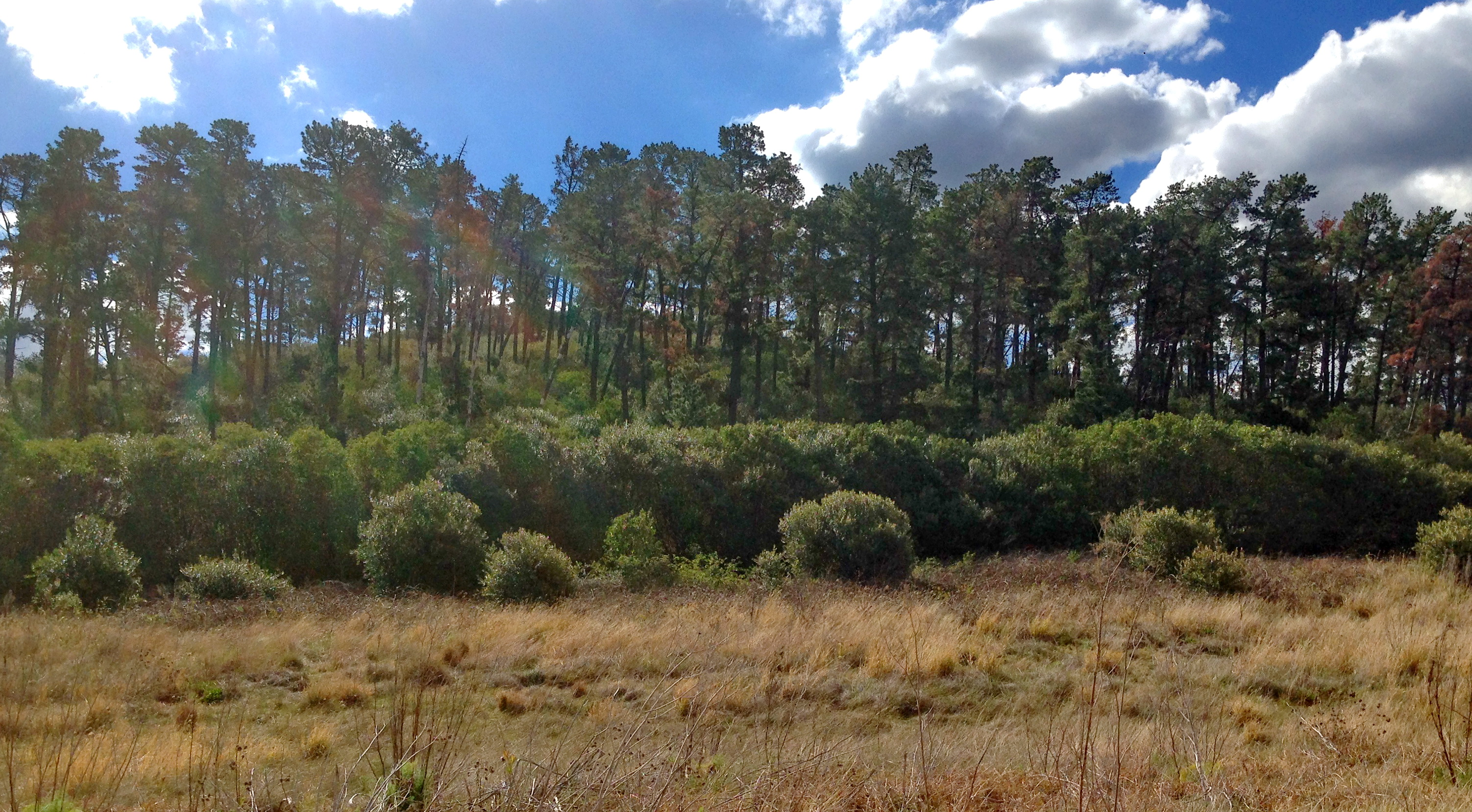
Monterey Pine trees plantation in Prospect Hill, Pemulwuy near Sydney in New South Wales

Pinus radiata was introduced to Australia in the 1870s. It is "the dominant tree species in the Australian plantation estate" – so much so that many Australians are concerned by the resulting loss of native wildlife habitat. The species is widely regarded as an environmental weed across southeastern and southwestern Australia and the removal of individual plants beyond plantations is encouraged. The Kuitpo Forest, 40 kilometres (25 miles) south-east of the Adelaide city centre, is a planted forest of Monterey Pine trees. 30 kilometres (19 miles) west of the Sydney city centre, there is a forest of introduced Monterey Pine trees in Prospect Hill, in the suburb of Pemulwuy.

=== Chile ===
Pinus radiata has greatly replaced the Valdivian temperate rain forests, where vast plantations have been planted for timber, again displacing the native forests. In 2001, this species produced 5,580,724 cubic meters of lumber, or 95% of Chile's total lumber production. In 2021 1.3 million of Chile's 2.3 million ha of forest plantations were planted with Pinus radiata.

=== New Zealand ===
The Monterey pine (always called "Radiata Pine" or Pinus radiata in New Zealand) was first introduced into New Zealand in 1859 and today 89% of the country's plantation forests are of this species. This includes the Kaingaroa Forest (on the central plateau of the North Island), which is one of the largest planted forests in the world. Mass plantings became common from 1900 in the Rotorua area where prison labour was used. In some areas (particularly areas that were formerly grazed that have had stock removed) it is considered an invasive species (termed a wilding conifer or more commonly wilding pine) where it has escaped from plantations. It is the most extensively used wood in New Zealand.

Use of pine in construction did not become widespread until forced by wartime shortages. It had been used in Southland from about 1920, but doubts were being expressed about it as late as 1945, when at least one MP considered it only suitable for interior studding. Experiments in pressure treatment with water-soluble preservatives were made from 1943.

=== Spain ===
In the Iberian Peninsula since the nineteenth century they have been introduced mainly in the north area in order to take advantage of their wood for the manufacture of paper pulp and for shoring work in coal mines. It is found in low altitude areas of the Autonomous Communities of Galicia, Asturias, Cantabria, the Basque Country, and in the north of the Canary Islands. On Tenerife the P. radiata was nearly eradicated by the 2010 cyclone Xynthia.

Pinus radiata forests have a negative effect on local ecology. In its plantations there are usually no other tree species, while its shady undergrowth does not allow the existence of a rich stratum of scrub. 13% of the wood cut annually in Spain comes from this pine.

=== United Kingdom ===
The cultivar P. radiata (Aurea Group) 'Aurea' has gained the Royal Horticultural Society's Award of Garden Merit.

=== United States ===
Pinus radiata is widely used in private gardens and public landscapes in temperate California, and similar climates around the world. It is particularly commonly grown as a landscape tree in coastal areas of California outside of its native range, where the climate is virtually identical to its native range. It is fast-growing and adaptable to a broad range of soil types and climates, though it does not tolerate temperatures below about −15 °C (5 °F). Its fast growth makes it ideal for landscapes and forestry; in a good situation, P. radiata can reach its full height in 40 years or so. Though a combination of biotic and abiotic factors determines the natural distribution of P. radiata, humans have broadly expanded its distribution up and down the California coast, even reaching Oregon.

== Uses ==
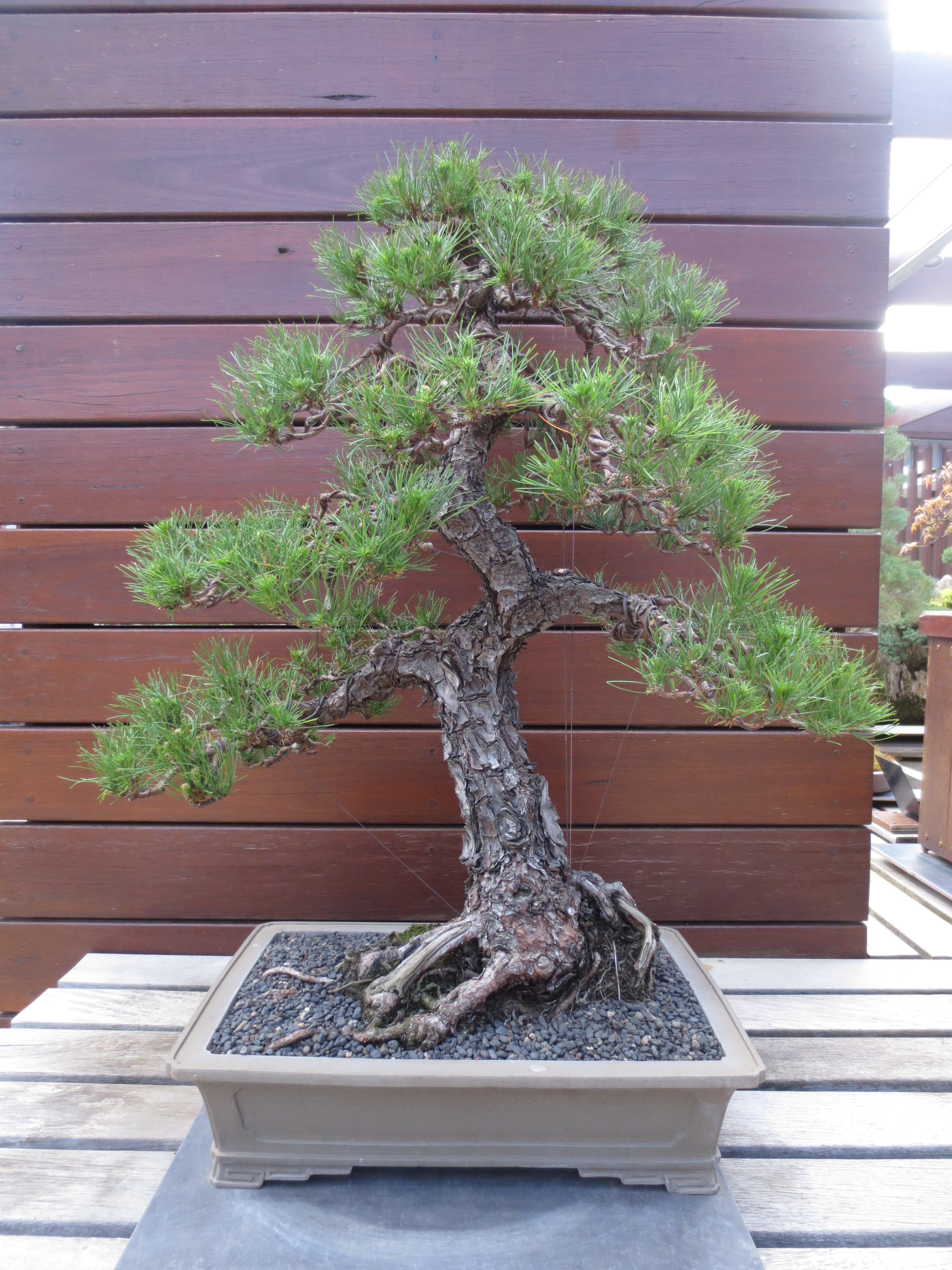
Forty-five year old Pinus radiata bonsai at the National Arboretum in Canberra

As timber P. radiata is suitable for a wide variety of uses, and has a resinous fragrance while being worked. It holds screws and nails well and takes paint and stain without difficulty, and modern kiln dried timber is very easy to work. It is about 1/3 heavier than dried western red cedar. It is brittle when bent, so does not have the same load-bearing features as Oregon pine (Douglas fir, Pseudotsuga).

Pinus radiata is used in house construction as weatherboards, posts, beams or plywood, in fencing, retaining walls, for concrete formers. It is also used to a limited extent in boat building where untreated ply is sometimes used, but must be encased in epoxy resin to exclude moisture.

The wood is normally kiln dried to 12% moisture in 6 m (19 ft 8 in) long, clear lengths. It is available treated with a range of chemical salts, or untreated. Chemical salt treatment is well proven and such timber is frequently used in the ground as posts and poles as part of structures such as retaining walls and pole houses. The name applied to this treatment is tanalized wood. H1 and H2 treatment is suited to indoor use. H3 is the standard house timber and this grade is used for fence palings. H4 and H5 are the standard for inground use. In New Zealand, a 1995 change to no longer require borate treatment in house framing timber was a key factor in the leaky homes crisis, but since 2003 a series of changes have now improved the regulations.

Lower grade timber is converted to pulp to make newsprint. Higher grade timber is used in house construction. P. radiata is used chipped to make particle board sheets, commonly used in flooring. Other sheet products are hardboard, softboard and ply. Most ply is structural and available in 7–22 mm (0.28–0.87 in) sizes. A small amount of higher grade ply is used to produce thinner (4 and 7 mm or 0.16 and 0.28 in) ply suitable for furniture, cabinet work and boat building. This is knot and crack free and glued with resorcinol waterproof glue. Since the 1990s finger jointed joinery-grade wood has become available in up to 6 m (19 ft 8 in) lengths in a wide range of profiles.

In 1958, New Zealand boat designer Des Townson started building 186 cold-moulded, eleven-foot (3.35 m) Zephyr-class dinghies, using P. radiata. In 2011 these hand-built boats fetched very high prices, and were generally in excellent condition.

The bark is used as a substrate for potting and re-potting orchids.

P. radiata is the most common species of Christmas tree in Australia and New Zealand.

In California, P. radiata is commonly planted to block wind or noise, or for ornamental uses.

== Bibliography ==
- León de la Luz, José Luis; Rebman, Jon P. & Oberbauer, Thomas (2003). On the urgency of conservation on Guadalupe Island, Mexico: is it a lost paradise? Biodiversity and Conservation 12(5): 1073–1082. doi:10.1023/A:1022854211166 (HTML abstract)
- McDonald, Philip M.; Laacke, Robert J. (1990). "Pinus radiata". In Burns, Russell M.; Honkala, Barbara H. (eds.). Conifers. Silvics of North America. Vol. 1. Washington, D.C.: United States Forest Service (USFS), United States Department of Agriculture (USDA) – via Southern Research Station.
