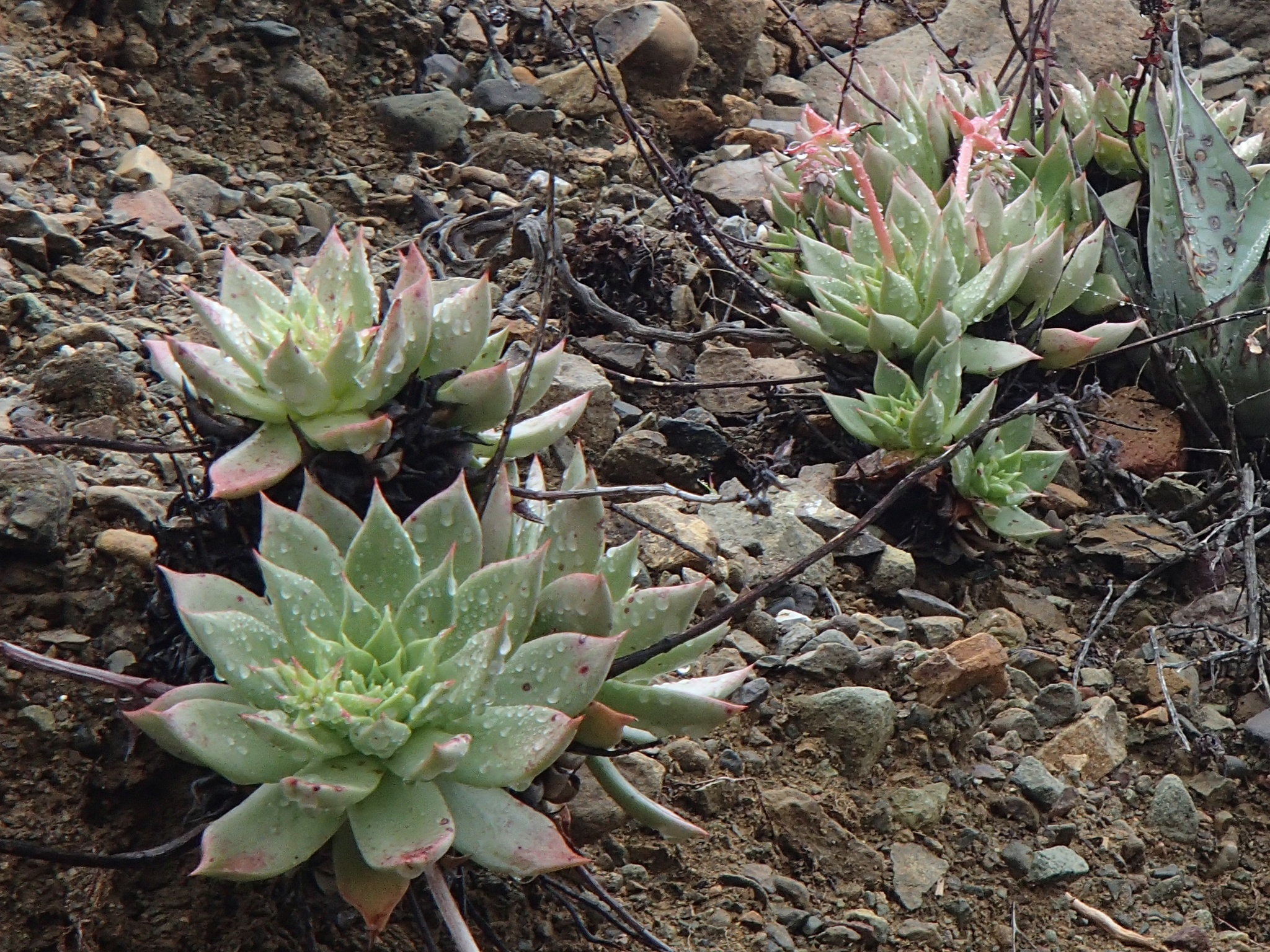

Scientific classification
- Kingdom: Plantae
- Clade: Tracheophytes
- Clade: Angiosperms
- Clade: Eudicots
- Order: Saxifragales
- Family: Crassulaceae
- Genus: Dudleya
- Species: D. cochimiana

Binomial name
- Dudleya cochimiana S.McCabe, 2022

= Dudleya cochimiana =

Cochimí liveforever

Species of succulent plant from Mexico

Dudleya cochimiana, commonly known as the Cochimí liveforever, is a species of succulent plant in the family Crassulaceae endemic to Cedros Island, a large island off of the coast of Baja California, Mexico. It is a rosette-forming leaf succulent characterized by broad, green to white leaves, and flowers with white to pink petals. It can be found on rocky slopes and canyons along the island.

== Description ==
Dudleya cochimiana is a rosette-forming succulent with broad green leaves and white to pink flowers. It is endemic to Cedros Island, where it grows sympatric with 4 other species in the genus: Dudleya acuminata, Dudleya albiflora, Dudleya delgadilloi, and Dudleya pachyphytum.

- Dudleya cochimiana differs from Dudleya acuminata with its larger rosettes with more leaves and its white to pink colored flowers, which are borne on pendent, lateral, or ascending inflorescences. Dudleya acuminata has yellow flowers borne upright.
- Dudleya cochimiana differs from Dudleya albiflora, Dudleya delgadilloi, and Dudleya pachyphytum in its broad leaves, its flowers with erect petals with only slightly outcurving tips, and the pendent, lateral, or ascending presentation of the flowers.

It is most similar to two species on the mainland of Baja California, namely Dudleya ingens and Dudleya gatesii.

Dudleya cochimiana flowers from April through June.

== Taxonomy ==
=== Taxonomic history ===
This species was first known as Dudleya cedrosensis, a name given to the plants by Reid Moran in his 1951 thesis on Dudleya. The failure of the thesis to be published meant that Dudleya cedrosensis was never a valid species, as Moran had difficulty reconciling some morphological differences between plants on the island. Although distinct, it was often regarded as a synonym of Dudleya ingens, due to the type collection being later identified as D. ingens aff, and sometimes associated with Dudleya albiflora.

In 2023, Stephen McCabe validly published and described Dudleya cochimiana in Madroño, which encompasses roughly the same plants Moran assigned to D. cedrosensis.

=== Etymology ===
Stephen McCabe named the specific epithet cochimiana in recognition of the indigenous people of the region, and their language and territory. Cochimí is an extinct language group and a collective name for the various tribes of the indigenous peoples of Cedros Island and central Baja California.

== Distribution and habitat ==
=== Distribution ===
Dudleya cochimiana is endemic to Cedros Island, an island in the Pacific Ocean off of the coast of the central Baja California Peninsula. The island belongs to the state of Baja California, Mexico.

Dudleya cochimiana is distributed on the eastern side of the island, where it is found from the beaches and then inland, where it reaches the Gran Cañón in the south and a large canyon under Pico Gill in the north, its distribution delimited by the ridgetops that divide the center of the island.

=== Habitat ===
Dudleya cochimiana grows in a variety of habitats within its small distribution, being found in full sun to part shade on rocky slopes and rocky outcrops. It is sometimes associated with cryptogamic communities near the ridgetops.

== See also ==
Other insular endemic Dudleya of Baja California

- Dudleya candida
- Dudleya guadalupensis
- Dudleya linearis
- Dudleya virens subsp. extima
