= Starling (dinghy) =

Type of sailing dinghy

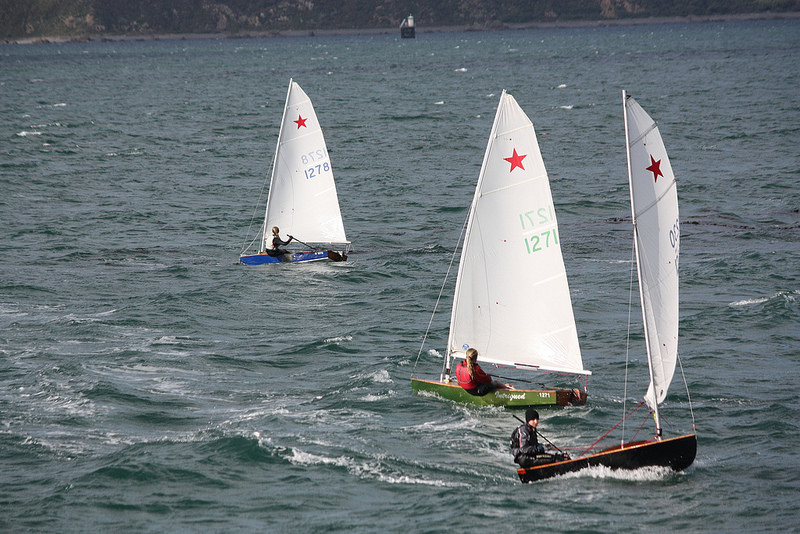
- Racing Starlings

Development
- Designer: Des Townson
- Year: 1969
- Design: One-Design
- Name: Starling

Boat
- Crew: 1-2

Hull
- Type: Monohull
- Construction: Wood; Fiberglass
- LOA: 9.55 ft (2.91 m)
- Beam: 4.04 ft (1.23 m)

Rig
- Rig type: Cat rig

The Starling is a New Zealand 9-foot-6-inch (2.90 m) sailing dinghy designed by Des Townson.

== Origins of the Starling ==
The Starling class yacht was conceived and the design commissioned by John Peet in the late 1960s. At the time, there were no single-handed boats available in New Zealand, for bridging the gap between the P-class and the adult Finn, OK, Cherokee and Zephyr classes. Many young sailors were leaving the sport because the step to the adult classes was too great. A stepping stone class was required. In consultation with parents of current P-class sailors, a set of criteria was formulated for the proposed class:

- The boat should cater to teenagers or any one heavy enough to sail one that are not able to cope with adult monotypes.
- Crew weight could be approximately 40–70 kilograms (88–154 lb).
- The boat should be easily handled in fresh conditions, plane readily and have good windward performance.
- The appearance of the boat to be of high priority.
- Buoyancy to be of P-class standard.
- Cockpit space for two teenagers or one adult.
- Construction to be simple.
- Very close restrictions so that all boats to have equal performance; e.g. masts from standard aluminium extrusion, sails from the same material and same loft.

Des Townson, the designer of the successful Zephyr, Mistral and Dart yachts of the period was approached to design the boat, and he completed this in June 1969. To confirm the simplicity of the construction concept, teenager David Peet built the prototype as his first boat-building project. The Starling was launched at Westhaven, Auckland on Anzac weekend 1970. Extensive testing of the prototype was completed over the following months, by dozens of P-class sailors. Feedback was very supportive and encouraging, with a great deal of enthusiasm expressed for the concept and the finished prototype.

The prototype Starling was sailing off the Glendowie Boating Club in the early 1970s. Originally, the sail design was fully battened; however, this was changed to the current format after feedback from sailors indicated a flexible sail layout was more suitable.

Quote excerpted from StarlingWebIntroduction.pdf

== Current Starling activities ==
The Starling is still a popular bridging class between the P-class and senior boats for competitive sailors in many parts of New Zealand, and is officially supported by Yachting New Zealand and organised by the Glendowie Boating Club.

Over 1300 boats have been built. The Starling Nationals is held once a year. It is normally held as the last summer season Starling regatta. The Starling Nationals in 2006 and 2007 had approximately one hundred and fifty entrants per series.
