= Dart (dinghy) =

Type of sailing dinghy

Development
- Designer: Des Townson
- Location: Auckland
- Name: Dart

Hull
- Type: Monohull
- LOH: 11 feet (3.4 m)

The Dart is a New Zealand one-design 11 foot sailing dinghy.

== History ==
The Zephyr was designed by Auckland designer Des Townson, in the late 1950s for building in plywood. It is a fast and attractive two person jib headed fractional sloop rigged dinghy Des designed for the Northcote Birkenhead Yacht Club of Auckland, New Zealand.

== See also ==
- Article on Dart class
- List of Townson Designs - from the Zephyr Owners Association website.
- Grahame Anderson (1999) FAST LIGHT BOATS, a Century of Kiwi Innovation.
