= Eriogonum molle =

Cedros soft buckwheat

Scientific classification
- Kingdom: Plantae
- Clade: Tracheophytes
- Clade: Angiosperms
- Clade: Eudicots
- Order: Caryophyllales
- Family: Polygonaceae
- Genus: Eriogonum
- Species: E. molle

Binomial name
- Eriogonum molle Greene, 1888

Species of wild buckwheat

Eriogonum molle, known by common name as the Cedros soft buckwheat, is a species of wild buckwheat endemic to Cedros Island, Mexico.

== Description ==
A shrubby plant, the leafy branches of Eriogonum molle reach about a foot or two high. The leaves are oblong, and obtuse at both ends, and are 2 to 4 inches long, attached to petioles nearly as long, cinereous above and beneath, with a dense, short, velvety pubescence and altogether devoid of white wool. The involucres are few, many-flowered, and corymbose on top of stout, naked peduncles that are a foot or two long.

== Taxonomy ==
This species was discovered by Edward Lee Greene on a journey to the northern end of Cedros Island. He later described it in the first volume of Pittonia.

== Distribution and habitat ==
This plant is only known from the rocky, extreme northern end of Cedros Island, scattered along summits and ridges. It shares a community with primarily succulent species, such as Agave sebastiana, Dudleya albiflora and Dudleya pachyphytum, all fed by the marine fog that frequently covers the northern end of the island.
