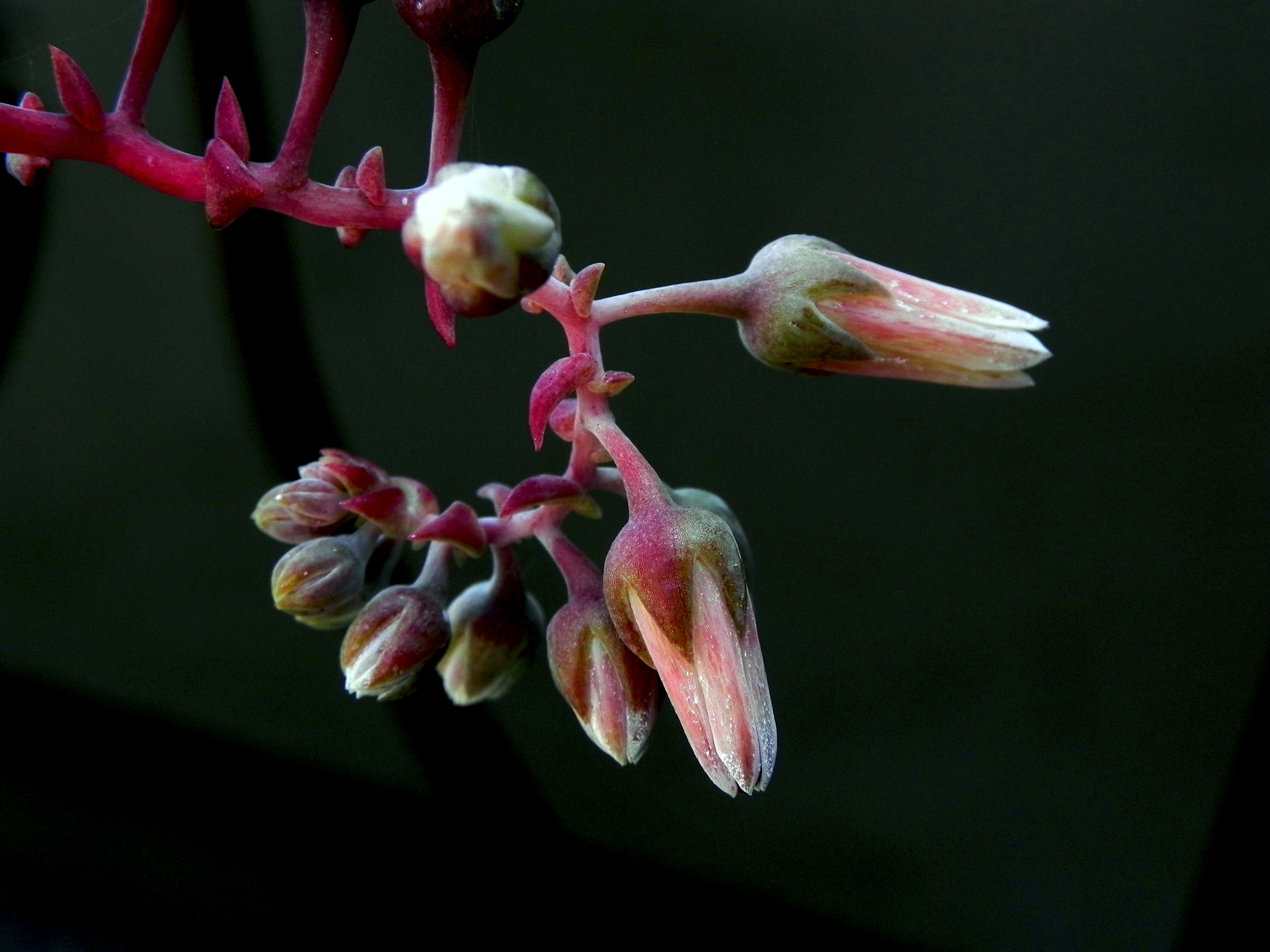
- The flowers

Scientific classification
- Kingdom: Plantae
- Clade: Tracheophytes
- Clade: Angiosperms
- Clade: Eudicots
- Order: Saxifragales
- Family: Crassulaceae
- Genus: Dudleya
- Species: D. gatesii

Binomial name
- Dudleya gatesii D. A. Johansen, 1932

= Dudleya gatesii =

Species of succulent plant

Dudleya gatesii, known by the common name as Gates' liveforever, is a species of perennial succulent plant in the family Crassulaceae. It is native to the central desert of the Baja California peninsula, found growing along dry and rocky outcroppings. It is characterized by red inflorescences topped with white flowers, bracts that are often reflexed downwards, and a rosette of dark-green leaves turning reddish.

== Description ==
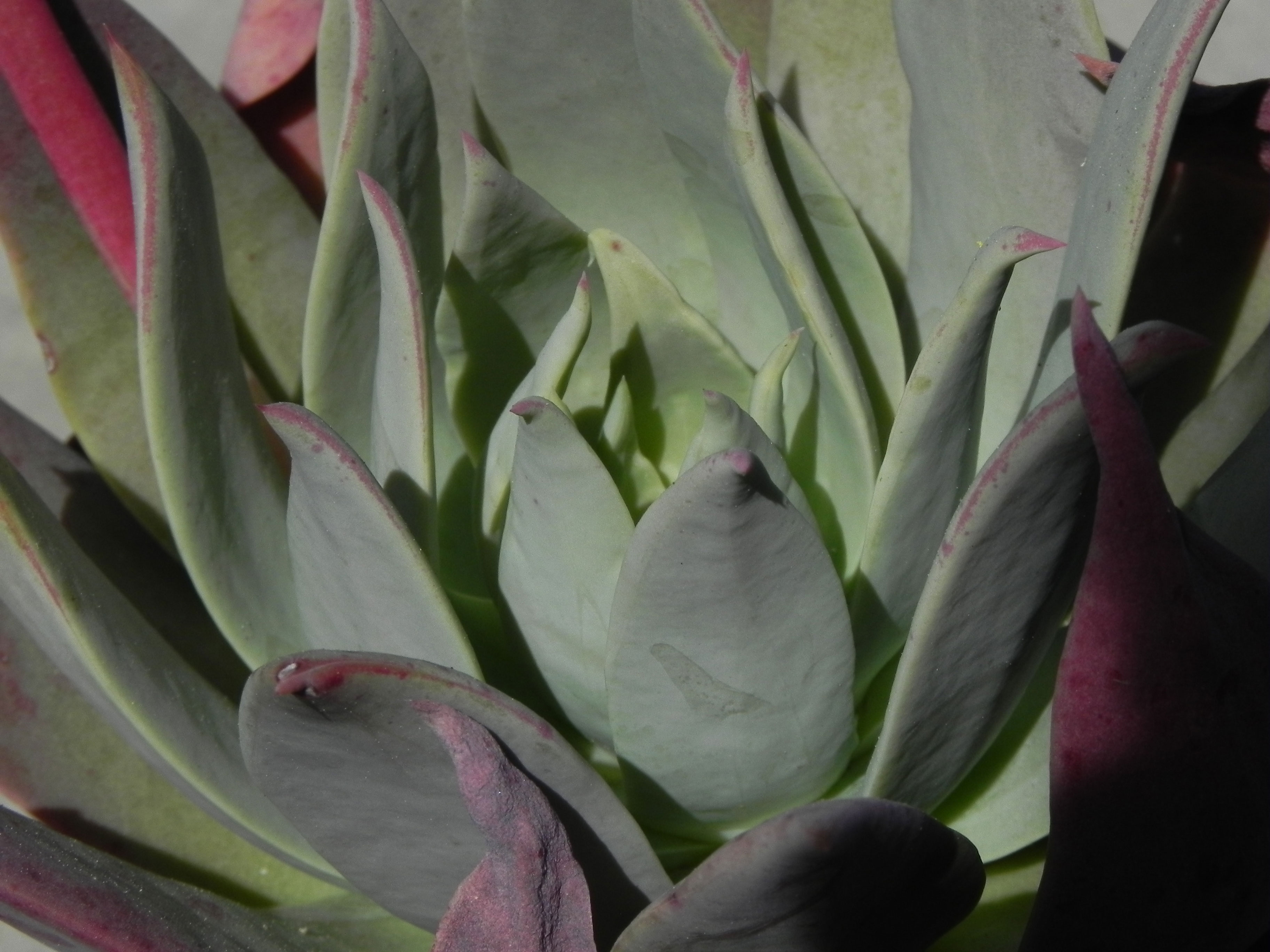
The rosette

Dudleya gatesii has a short, stout caudex, with either 1 to 3 rosettes emerging. The leaves are shaped triangular-ovate to oblong, long-attenuate, with green or red colorations on older and weathered leaves. The older leaves are thick and have a leathery texture. Up to 3 red flowering stalks arise from the axils between younger and older leaves. Racemes are secund, and the inflorescence bears a deep red coloration. The calyx is a bright green. The corolla is pure white, the petals occasionally tinged with rose, and weakly keeled.

=== Morphology ===
The rosettes measure 10–20 cm (3.9–7.9 in) in diameter, with 25 to over 40 leaves attached to it. The leaves measure 6–15 cm (2.4–5.9 in) long by 1.5–3.5 cm (0.59–1.38 in) wide, and at the base the leaves are 1.2–5 cm (0.47–1.97 in) wide.

The red-colored scape is 20–70 cm (7.9–27.6 in) tall. The terminal branches on the inflorescence are spreading, measure 4–14 cm (1.6–5.5 in) long, and have 7 to 17 flowers on them. The flowers are suspended by pedicels 6–12 mm (0.24–0.47 in) long.

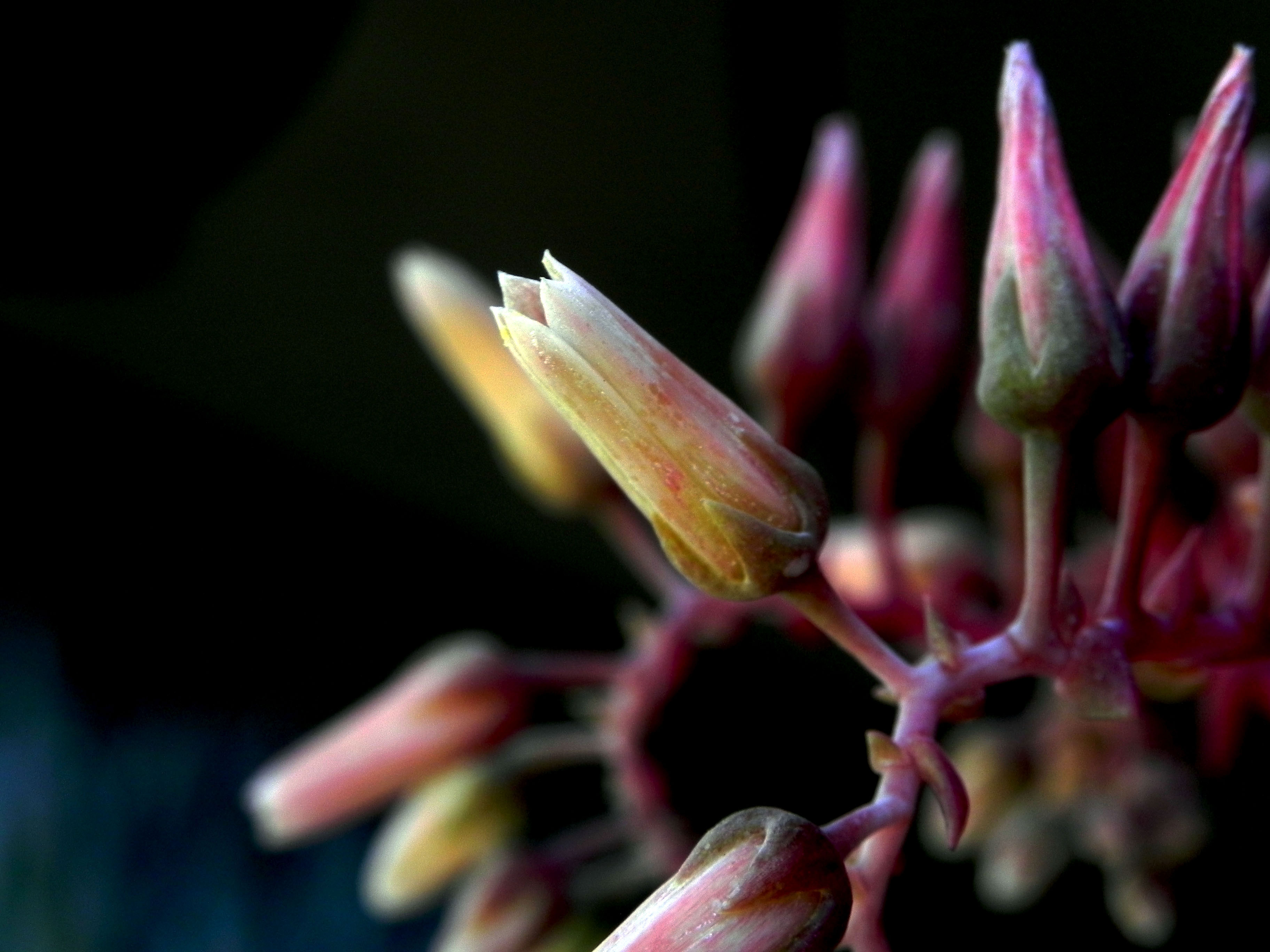
Detail of a flower. Spent flowers on the right

The calyx measures 6–7 mm (0.24–0.28 in), with triangular sepals with acute tips. the sepals measuring 4–5 mm (0.16–0.20 in). The petals are shaped narrowly oblong, and measure 10–14 mm (0.39–0.55 in) long by roughly 2 mm (0.079 in) wide. The anthers are red, and the carpels are slender and erect, measuring 6–9.5 mm (0.24–0.37 in). The styles measure 1–2 mm (0.039–0.079 in).

== Taxonomy ==
The type specimen of this species was collected by Howard E. Gates in 1931, the locality given being a granitic hill by the El Barril road, 15 miles east of Calmalli, Baja California. Apparently the type specimen is lost, but the plant was recorded in habitat from a photograph taken by Gates, showcasing the reflexed bracts and immature inflorescences.

The plant is a tetraploid relative to the base number of the genus, with a chromosome count of n = 34. It shares this ploidy with Dudleya ingens and Dudleya cedrosensis, both of which also have green leaves, reddish inflorescences, and white flowers. Reid Moran suggested that the three species could form a series, and that all three species could be allotetraploids with one parental species in common, but the other parent of another species.

=== Etymology ===
Dudleya gatesii (Gates' liveforever) is named after Howard E. Gates, in honor of his exploratory and collection efforts for the Dudleya genus in Baja California.

== Distribution and habitat ==
Dudleya gatesii is native to the central portion of the Baja California Peninsula, from the vicinity of El Desengaño in Baja California State to the Sierra de San Francisco in Baja California Sur.

Dudleya gatesii grows along dry and rocky outcroppings, being easily distinguishable by the white flowers and red stalks.
