= Zephyr (dinghy) =

Sailing dinghy class

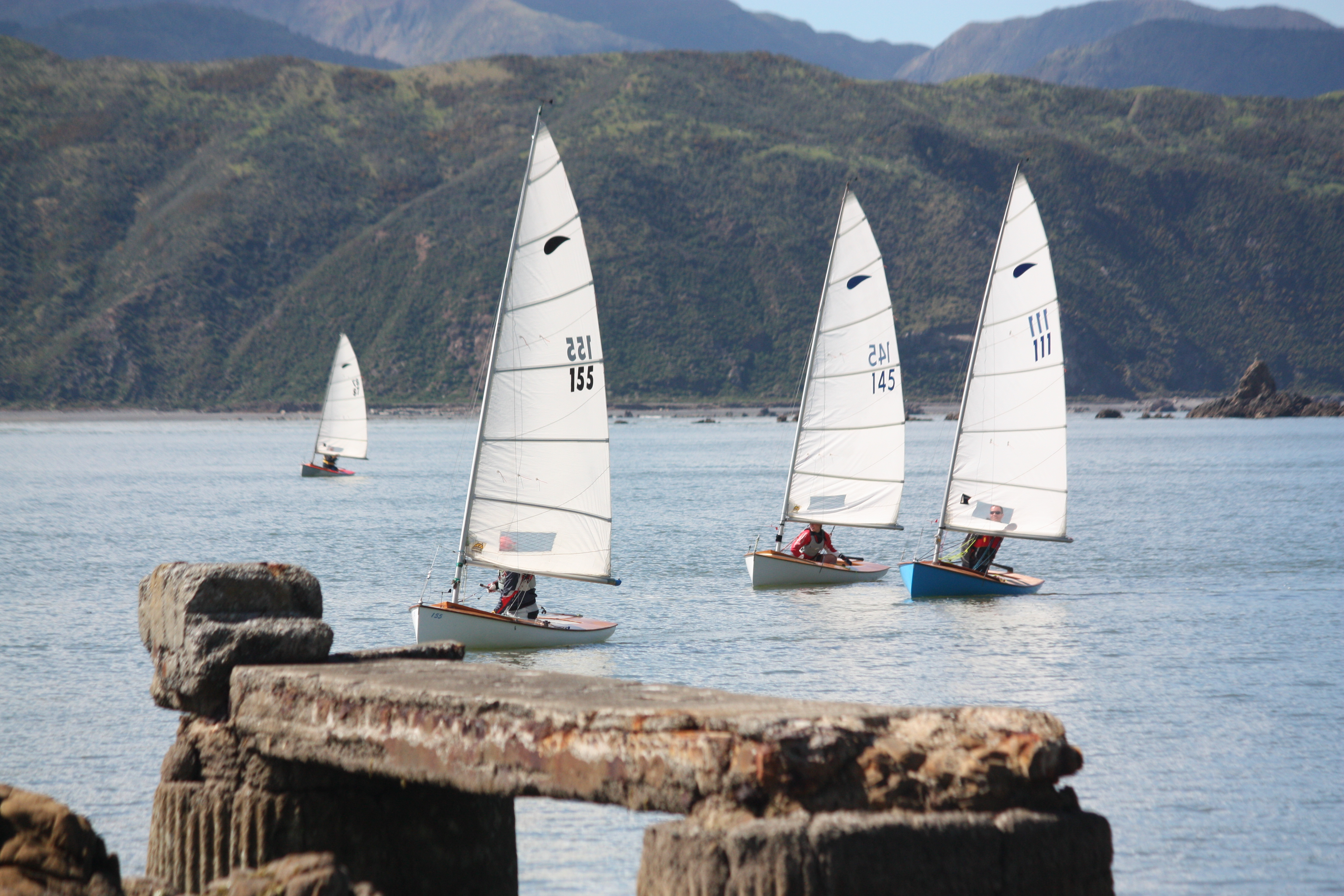
- Zephyr yachts at Worser Bay Boating Club, Wellington NZ

Development
- Designer: Des Townson
- Location: Auckland, New Zealand
- Year: 1956
- Design: One-design
- Name: Zephyr

Boat
- Crew: 1
- Trapeze: No

Hull
- Type: Monohull
- LOA: 3.35 m (11 ft 0 in)

Hull appendages
- Keel: Daggerboard

Rig
- Mast height: 5,640 m (18,500 ft)

Sails
- Spinnaker area: n/a

The Zephyr is a New Zealand one-design 3.35-metre (11.0 ft) sailing dinghy. Zephyrs are a national class, administered by the Zephyr Owners' Association. Hull form and sail plans are restricted, to ensure all boats have the same potential speed.

== History ==
The Zephyr was designed by Auckland New Zealand yacht designer Des Townson in 1956.

Des built all the first hulls himself (numbers 1 to 233) in Pinus radiata veneer, off the same mould, even though many were completed by their owners to the strict one design rules of the class. All sails for this series of boats were made by Auckland sailmakers Boyd & McMaster. In fact the original class rules stipulated that sails must be "strictly to a pattern lodged with Boyd and McMaster sailmakers."

Des was one of the early adopters of mass production in recreational boatbuilding using the postwar (WW2) available waterproof glues - in this case Resin Syrup by Desford or Cascade as used in construction of the De Havilland Mosquito aircraft not so many years earlier. He also developed efficient techniques for removing staples from the veneer after glue setting using the recently released synthetic packaging strap which was starting to replace metal binding. Staples were set through the strapping when the veneers were fixed. Staple removal mostly was achieved by pulling up one of the strap with the staples still engaged saving substantial time over traditional removal, and with less veneer damage.

During the 1970s demand for new boats arose; many of the original 233 boats had been beautifully maintained and restored but more were required. Approaches to Townson revealed that the original mould had been cut up by him to make space in his Dunlop Lane, Panmure, workshop. This was to make way for his subsequent larger keelboat construction including the well known Townson 32's Moonlight, Starlight, Twilight, Townson 33 Restless and Townson 34's Dreamtime and Talent along with many others. In the early 1970s Des consented to two replacement Zephyr building jigs being constructed, one in each of Christchurch and Auckland, New Zealand. Boats 233 to 250(?) were built in the same manner as by the designer and to the strict rules of the class. This system remained in use until the advent of cedar glass boats, when a new jig was built for the production of "250" series hulls.

There are active fleets at Wellington's Worser Bay Boating Club, as well as in Auckland, Hamilton and Canterbury. In 2016, a glass reinforced composite (GRP) version of the Zephyr was introduced. All new boats built today are of the type by Mackay Boats.

== See also ==
- Grahame Anderson (1999) FAST LIGHT BOATS, a Century of Kiwi Innovation.
- Harold Kidd and Robin Elliott (1999) Southern breeze. A history of yachting in New Zealand.
