= Des Townson =

New Zealand yacht designer

Desmond Thomas Townson MNZM (16 March 1934 – 15 October 2008) was a New Zealand yacht designer. As a teenager he won the Tanner Cup in 1950, the nation's premier teenage yachting championship and he designed some of the best-known classes in New Zealand sailing, including the Starling, Zephyr Mistral and Dart dinghy classes.

As well dinghies, he also designed many classes of light and medium displacement keel boats, commencing with the Townson 26 flyer Serene, followed by the plywood Townson 22 Pied Piper. Later the renowned "Moonlight" trialed impressively for the New Zealand entry for the One Ton Cup in 1971 and he followed this with a series of successful designs including the Townson 32's Starlight and Twilight, the transitional Townson 33 Restless - and culminating in his most successful keelboat designs, the Townson 34's Dreamtime and Talent.

He is credited with having at least 3,500 of his designs produced by 2008, when his contribution to yachting earned him membership in the New Zealand Order of Merit in the 2008 Queen's Birthday Honours.

In his later years Townson focused on producing his one-design radio controlled Electron racing yachts. Townson died on 15 October 2008 at his home in Auckland after a long battle with cancer.

== Bibliography ==
- Elliot, Harold Kidd Robin; Pardon, David (1999). Southern Breeze - A History of Yachting in New Zealand (Hardback). Auckland: Penguin Books. ISBN 0-670-88650-5.
