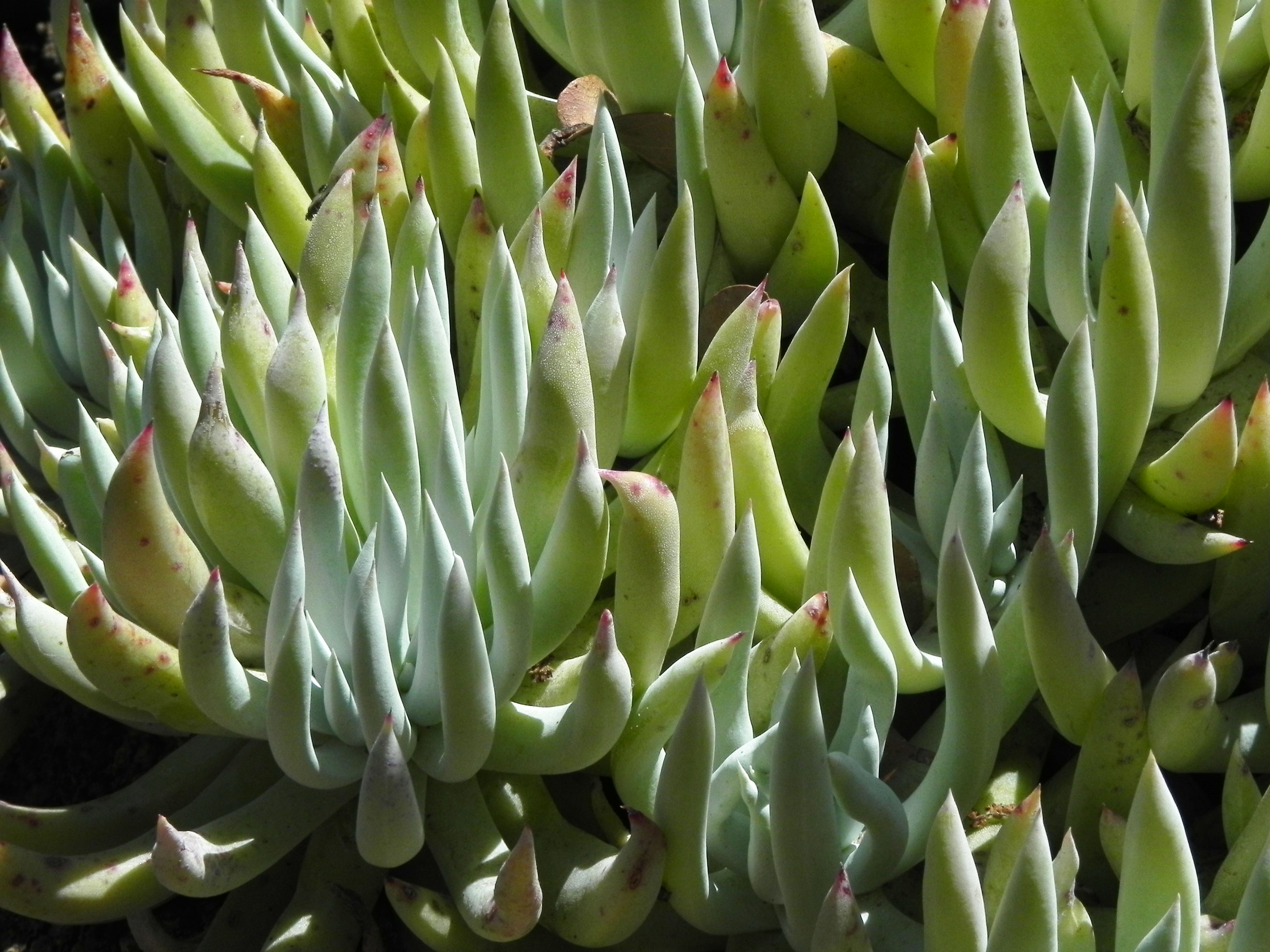
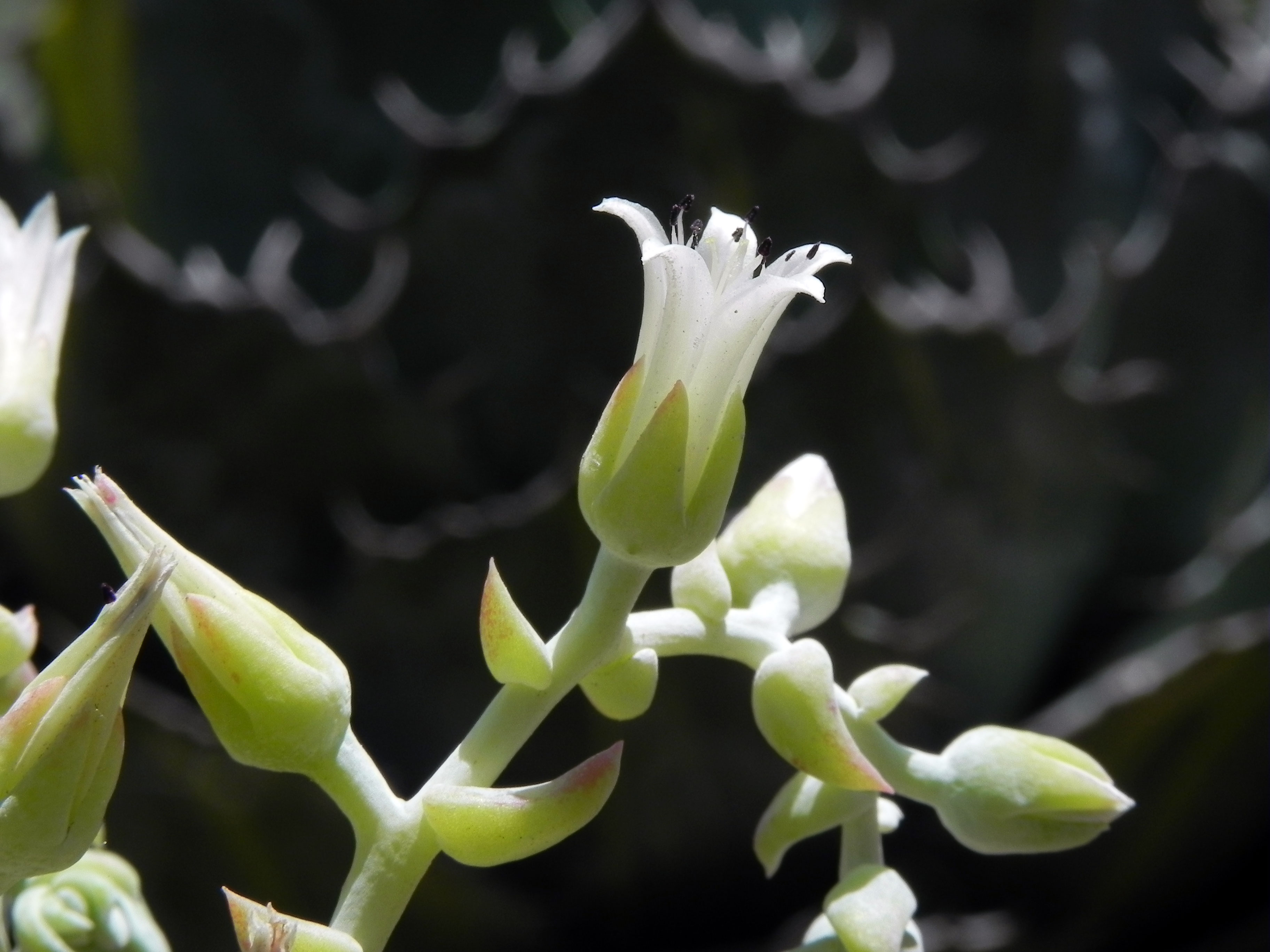
- The basal rosettes (top) and a flower (bottom)

Scientific classification
- Kingdom: Plantae
- Clade: Tracheophytes
- Clade: Angiosperms
- Clade: Eudicots
- Order: Saxifragales
- Family: Crassulaceae
- Genus: Dudleya
- Species: D. albiflora

Binomial name
- Dudleya albiflora Rose, 1903

Synonyms
- Cotyledon albiflora (Rose) Fedde; Dudleya moranii D.A.Johans.; Echeveria albiflora (Rose) A. Berger

= Dudleya albiflora =

White-flower liveforever

Species of succulent

Dudleya albiflora, known by the common name white-flower liveforever, is a species of succulent perennial plant in the family Crassulaceae. It is native to the Baja California Peninsula. This species represents numerous populations with varying chromosome numbers scattered around the peninsula, but all share broad, common morphological traits such as white flowers and narrow leaves.

== Description ==
=== Morphology ===
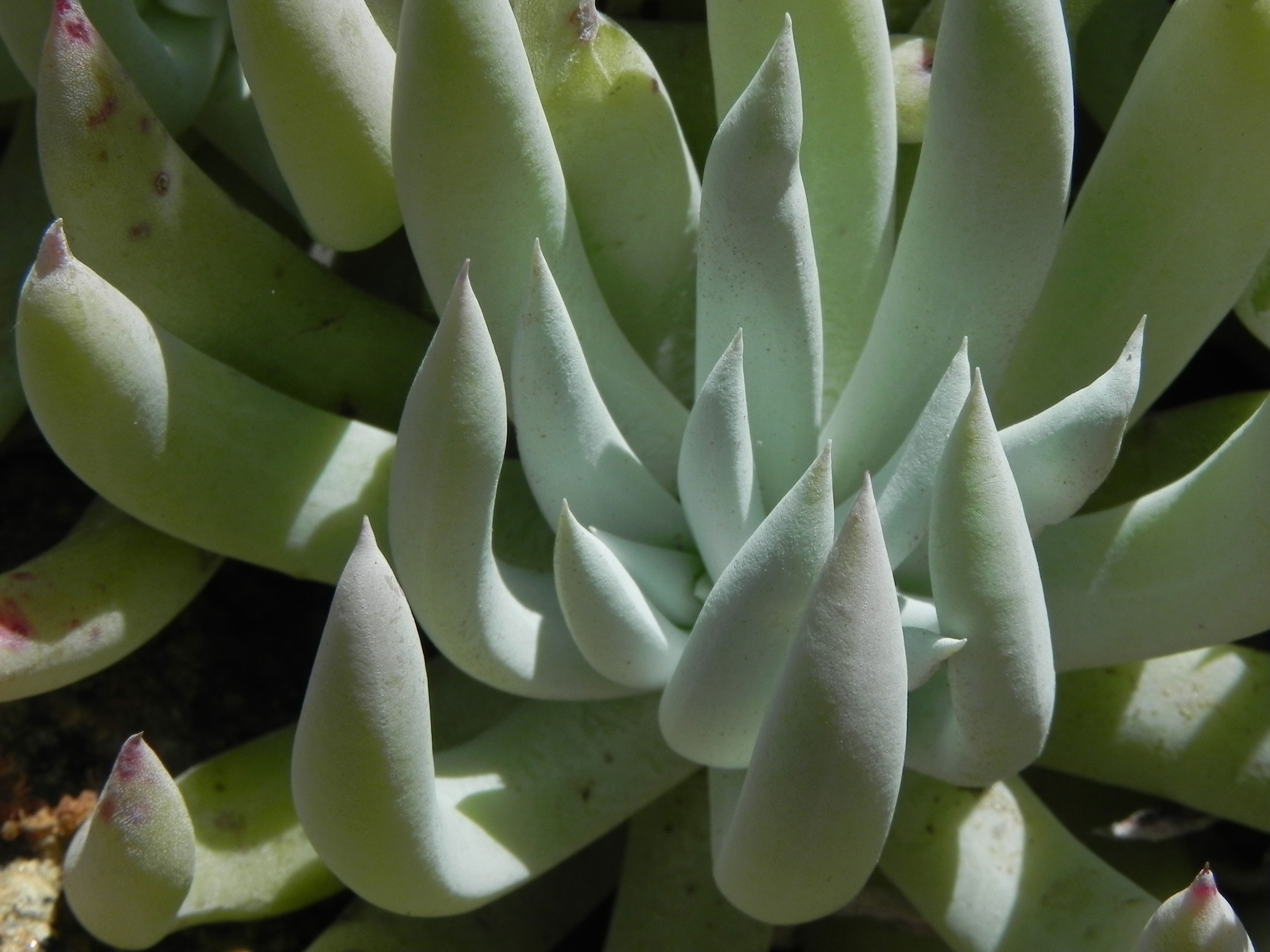
Detail of the rosette. A cultivated plant, grown from seed from the type locality.

This species has many varying forms based on location. The first description, by Joseph Nelson Rose, refers to the type specimen of Dudleya albiflora collected at Magdalena Bay, in Baja California Sur. This plant is a rosette-forming perennial succulent, with plants clumping to form up to 25 or more rosettes. The leaves are narrow, strap-shaped to lanceolate, 1 to 1.5 cm broad, and 4 to 5 cm long, with a distinctive flattened but thick and fleshy shape. The leaves are not glaucous and become purplish in color towards the tips. The corolla is white. Chromosome number is 85 for the Magdalena Bay plants. Plants on Isla Espiritu Santo and Isla Partida east of La Paz have a chromosome number of 34 and narrower, white leaves.

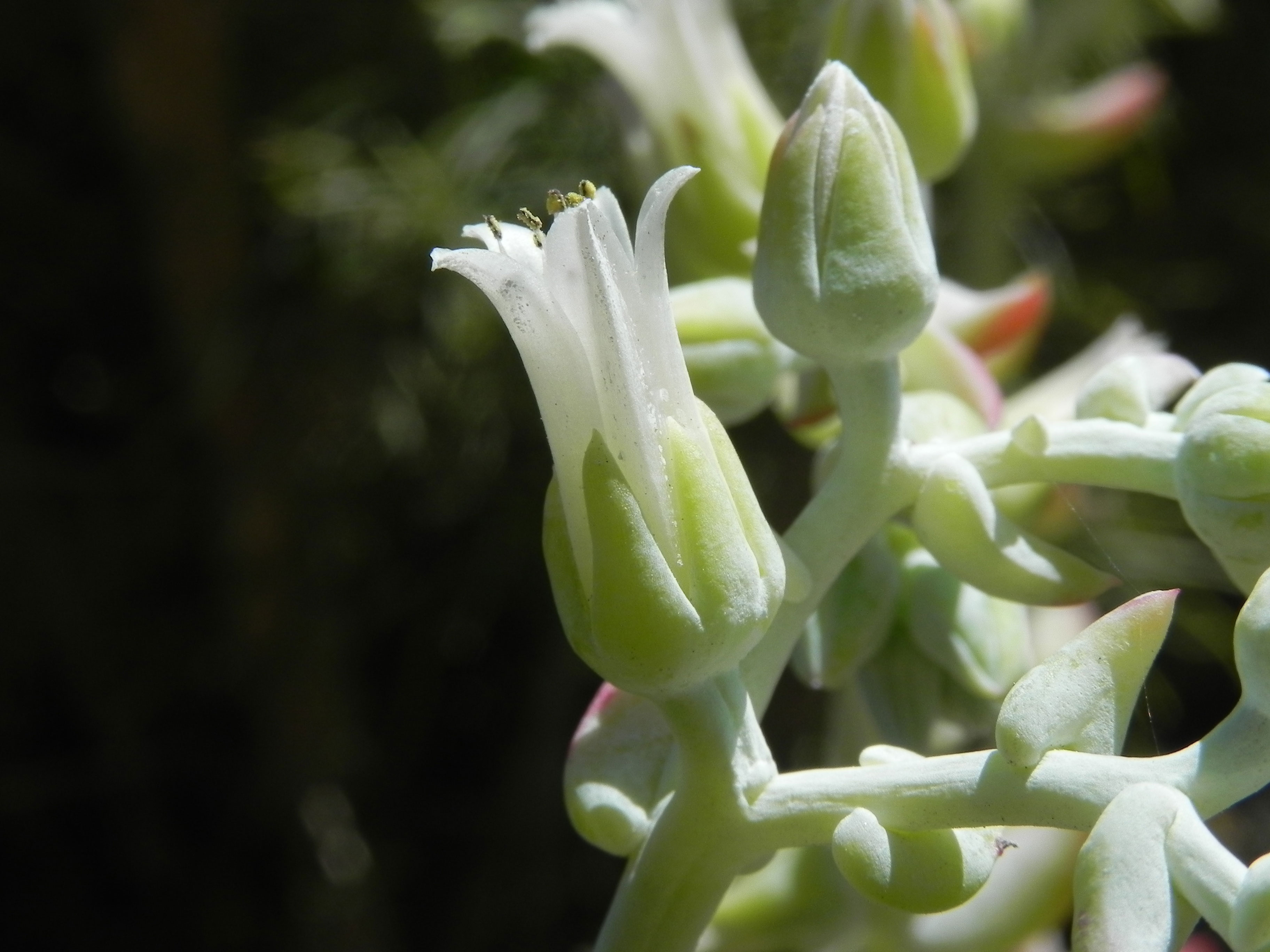
The white flowers.

The second description is based on Dudleya moranii, known commonly as the Moran dudleya, a species described in Miller's Landing, Baja California. This species was moved into a synonym for D. albiflora, but it has varying chromosome counts compared to the plants in the D. albiflora type locality. This plant is solitary when young, but eventually divides by twos into up to 8 rosettes, and has a caudex 2 in (5.1 cm) to 5 in (13 cm) long. The basal leaves spread evenly, with the lower ones decurrent. The leaves are linear-attenuate, and their tips are abruptly short-acuminate or cuspidate, with the leaves 8 to 10 cm long and 1.5 to 2 cm wide at the base. They are colored a light greenish-yellow, and have a light red coloration at the tips of the bases. The leaves are stiff, solid and brittle. Flowering stems emerge from the axils of maturing leaves. The sepals are glossy green and tipped with red. The corolla is a pure, opaque white, with the tips slightly spreading. Chromosome number is 51 for most mainland and Cedros Island plants, 68 for Isla Natividad and Punta San Pablo plants.

== Taxonomy ==
=== Taxonomic history ===
The type specimen was collected by T.S. Brandegee in Magdalena Bay, and he brought it to the New York Botanical Garden, where it flowered in 1903. That same year, Joseph Nelson Rose described the species Dudleya albiflora during his work on North American Crassulaceae with Nathaniel Lord Britton. In 1911, Rose returned to collect the plant again at the type locality. In 1921, Ivan M. Johnston collected the plant while working with a scientific expedition sent by the California Academy of Sciences with the intent to explore the islands in the Gulf of California. Living specimens from that expedition first went to Washington, and from there, plants were sent to the New York Botanical Garden, where illustrations were made of plants in flower in 1923.

The type specimen of Dudleya moranii, which is representative of the more northerly plants, was collected by Mr. Howard H. Gates, who is also the namesake of Dudleya gatesii. The species Dudleya moranii was described by Donald A. Johansen, who named the plant after the then 16-year old Reid V. Moran, who he noted as a "discriminating young collector... who has forwarded to the writer innumerable specimen plants of many species of Dudleya and related genera..." D. moranii was synonymized into D. albiflora, but some writers, such as Paul Thomson, have argued that they deserve to remain separate.

A population of plants with an affinity to D. albiflora exists on the western slopes of the Sierra de San Francisco.

== Distribution and habitat ==
Dudleya albiflora occurs from the desolate southern Baja California coast south to the islands of Espiritu Santo and Isla Partida off of La Paz. It occurs in a variety of widely separated coastal locations and some inland locations. It is present on Cedros Island and Isla Natividad in the Pacific. Plants with an affinity to this species are found far inland in the Sierra de San Francisco.
