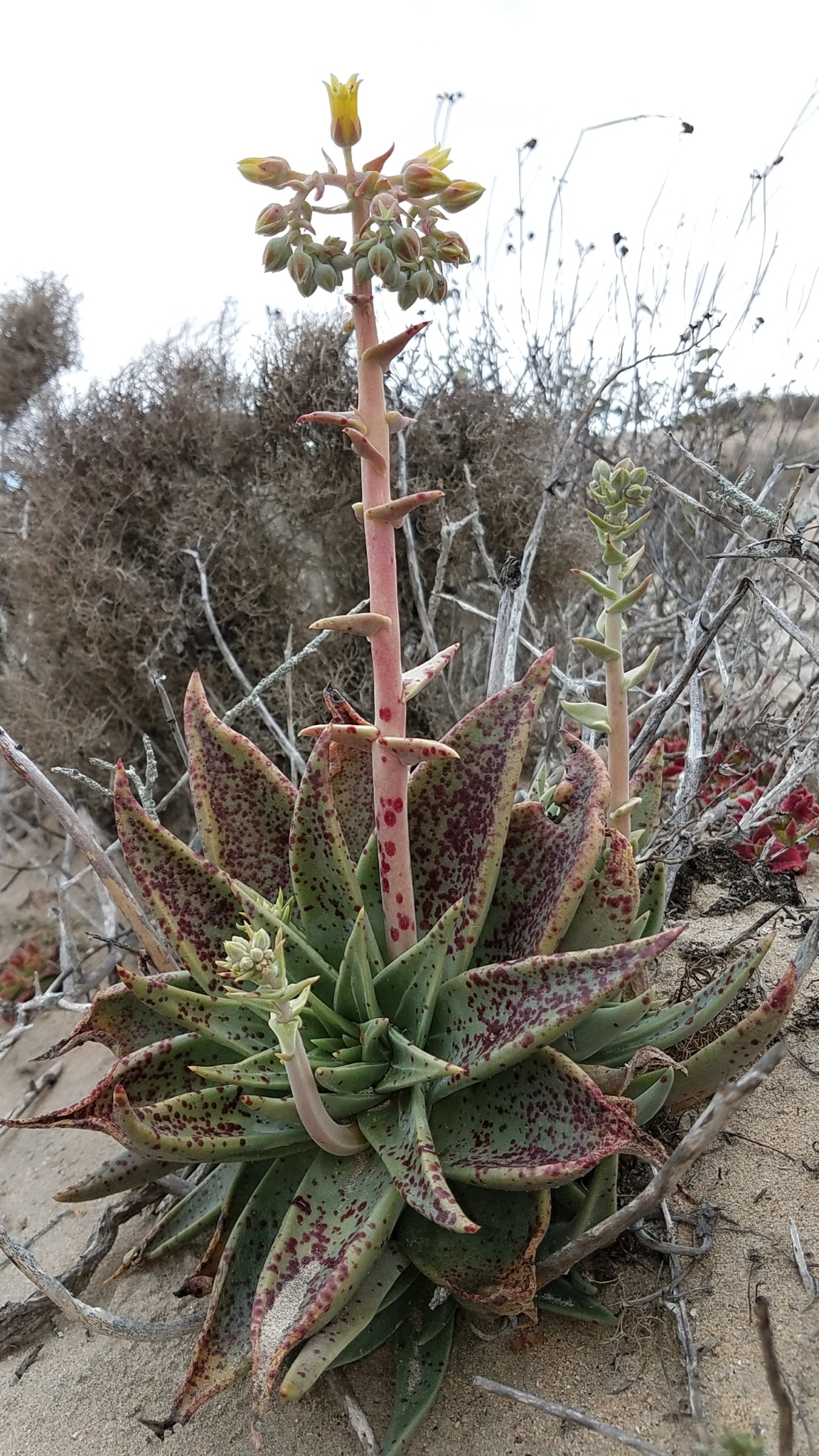

Scientific classification
- Kingdom: Plantae
- Clade: Tracheophytes
- Clade: Angiosperms
- Clade: Eudicots
- Order: Saxifragales
- Family: Crassulaceae
- Genus: Dudleya
- Species: D. acuminata

Binomial name
- Dudleya acuminata Britton & Rose 1903

Synonyms
- Cotyledon acuminata (Rose) Fedde; Cotyledon brandegeei (Rose) Fedde; Dudleya brandegeei Rose ex Britton & Rose; Echeveria acuminata (Rose) A.Berger; Echeveria brandegeei (Rose) A.Berger

= Dudleya acuminata =

Species of succulent plant from Mexico

Dudleya acuminata is a species of succulent perennial plant in the family Crassulaceae known by common name as the Vizcaino liveforever. A rosette-forming leaf succulent, it has reddish yellow flowers that emerge from April to May. It is native to the Pacific coast of the Vizcaino Desert on the Baja California Peninsula, and on neighboring islands.

== Description ==
=== Morphology ===
The plant grows caespitosely, with 5 to 6 dense rosettes growing from a thick caudex. The leaves are not very numerous, broadly ovate, 4 to 7 cm long, broadest at the base, thick, and pale green but not glaucous. The peduncle is 25 to 30 cm high, with bracts 1 to 1.5 cm long, ovate, acute, and sagittate at the base. The inflorescence is slightly glaucous. The pedicels are short, 3 to 6 mm long. On the flower, the calyx is 5 mm long, deeply 5-cleft, with the lobes triangular-ovate. The corolla is a reddish yellow.

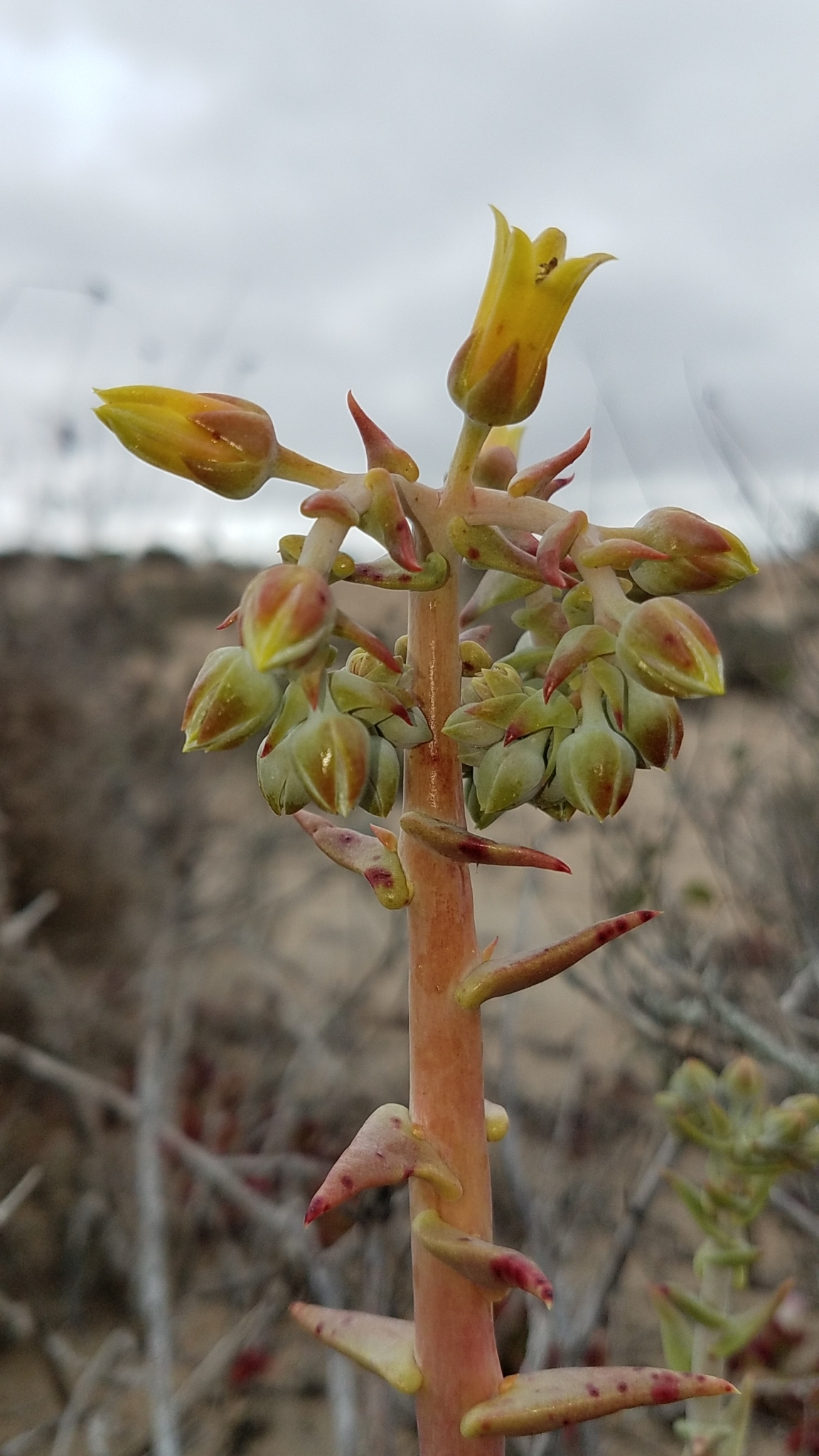
Developing flowers

Flowering is during April and May. Chromosome number is 17.

== Distribution and habitat ==
This species is endemic to the Baja California Peninsula and the surrounding islands. It occurs in extreme southern Baja California and northern Baja California Sur. It is also present on Cedros Island.

== Cultivation ==
Growers of the plant report that germination and growth during the first year is rapid, but mortality rates are high regardless of medium. It may benefit to place the plants under partial shade.
