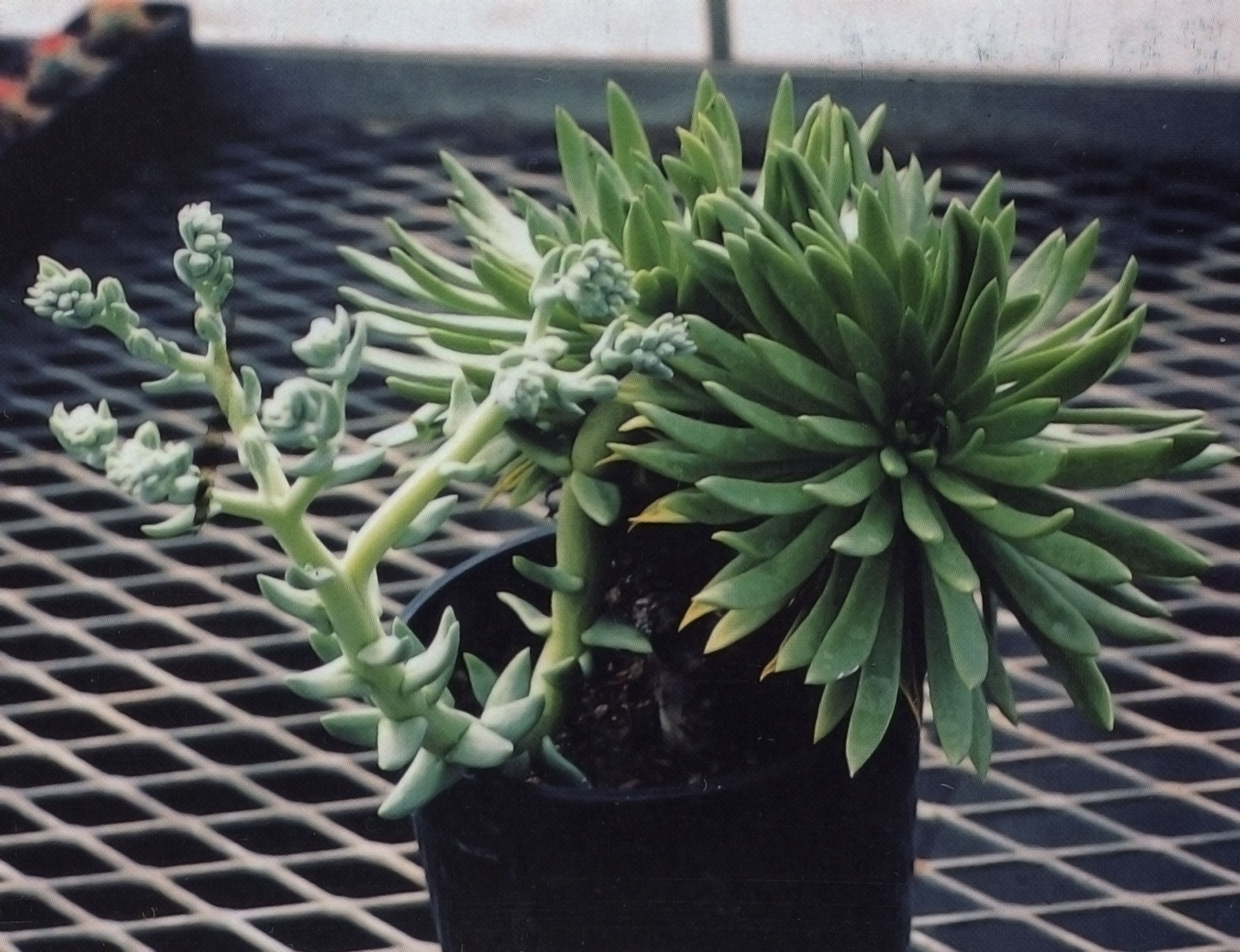
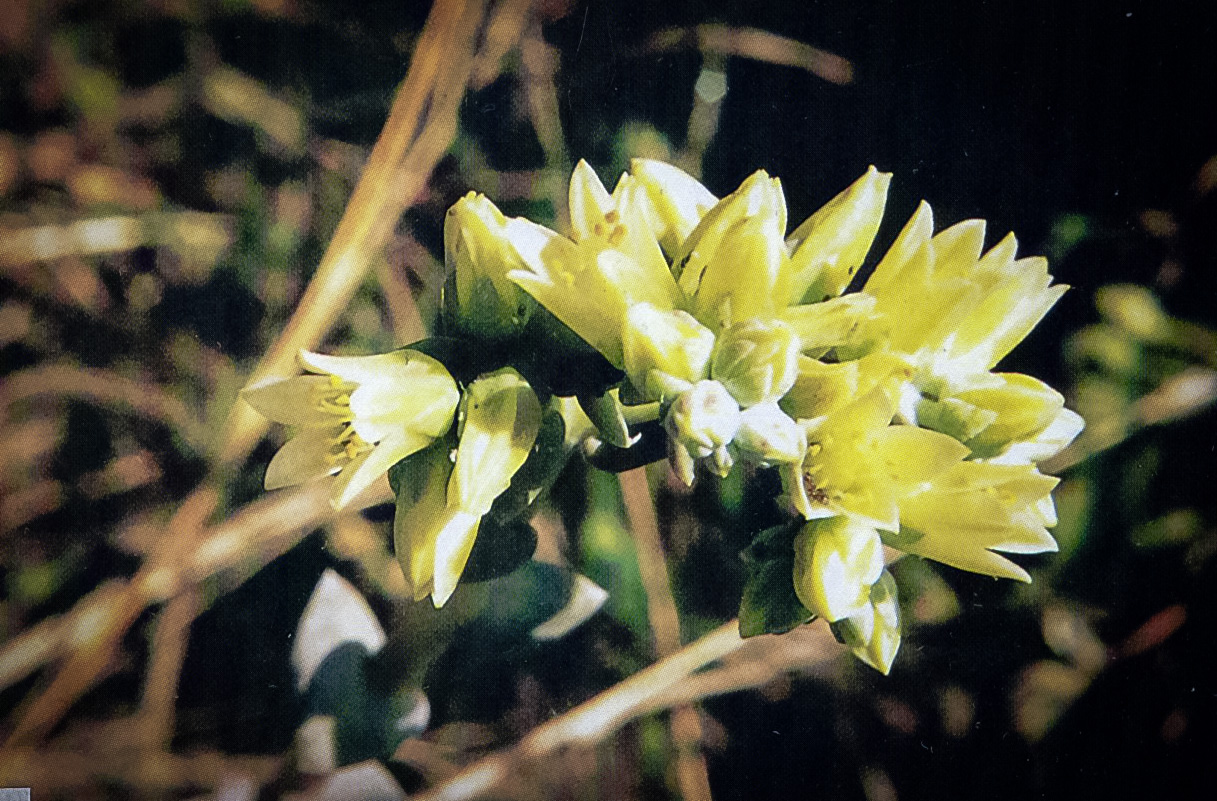
- Plant with inflorescence (top) and flower (bottom)

Scientific classification
- Kingdom: Plantae
- Clade: Tracheophytes
- Clade: Angiosperms
- Clade: Eudicots
- Order: Saxifragales
- Family: Crassulaceae
- Genus: Dudleya
- Species: D. guadalupensis

Binomial name
- Dudleya guadalupensis Moran

= Dudleya guadalupensis =

Species of succulent plant from Mexico

Dudleya guadalupensis is a very rare species of succulent perennial plant in the family Crassulaceae commonly known as the Guadalupe liveforever. It is a rosette-forming leaf succulent, with foliage that is variously colored light green, green, and a waxy white. It is characterized by dense leaves that fold over the center in dormancy, a curving, sinuous flower stalk, and white, cup-shaped flowers. It is endemic to the rocks and islets off of Guadalupe Island, an isolated volcanic island in the Pacific Ocean located 241 kilometers off of the coast of Baja California.

== Description ==
A densely-leaved species of Dudleya, with the outer foliage folding over the center, giving the rosettes a rounded appearance. It has a curved flower stalk and white flowers that form a cup or "V" shape.

=== Morphology ===
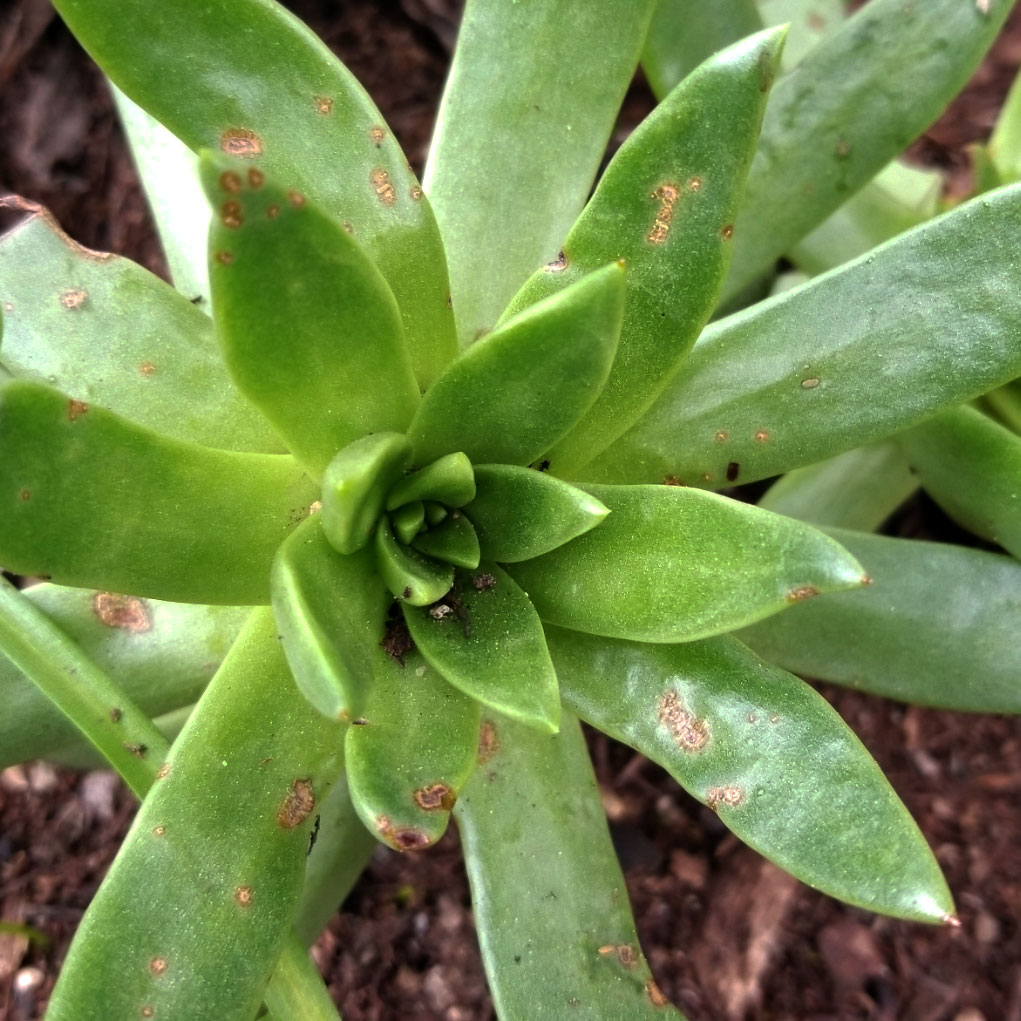
At the Huntington Botanic Garden

Like most other Dudleya, this plant is a rosette-forming leaf succulent which grows rosettes on the tips of a stem, with the stem also referred to as a caudex. In this species, the caudex is 1.5 to 3.5 cm (0.59 to 1.38 in) thick, and elongates up to 15 cm (5.9 in) or more long, the caudex branching to form rounded clumps up to 50 cm (20 in) wide, of up to 80 or more rosettes. The rosettes are almost globe-shaped, 3–15 cm (1.2–5.9 in) wide, of 24–40 leaves, with the leaves colored a pale green, green, or white with epicuticular wax. The leaves are shaped oblong to oblanceolate, the leaf margins rounded, and the tip apiculate to acuminate. Each leaf is typically 2.5–6.5 cm (0.98–2.56 in) long, 8–13 mm (0.31–0.51 in) wide, 2–3 mm (0.079–0.118 in) thick, and 4–8 mm (0.16–0.31 in) at the base.

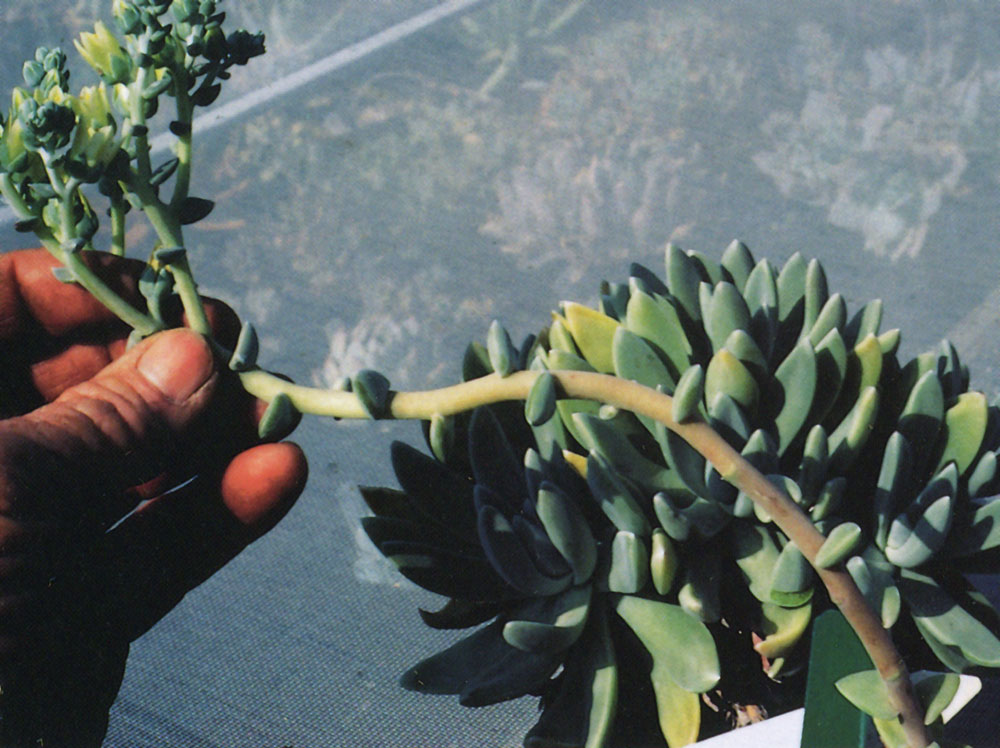
Flowering at the Huntington Botanic Garden

The floral stems of this species are characterized by an unusual sinuous habit, in that they curve downward at first, and then curve up. The floral stems are glaucous, 20–30 cm (7.9–11.8 in) long and 4–7 mm (0.16–0.28 in) thick. The floral stem is bare of bracts in the lower 5 cm (2.0 in), but above that has 15–35 bracts. The bracts themselves are shaped triangular-ovate, with an acute tip, and with a glaucous surface. The lowermost bracts measure 1–2 cm (0.39–0.79 in) long, and 7–10 mm (0.28–0.39 in) wide. The cyme is glaucous, and consists of 2-3 ascending simple or bifurcated branches, with the terminal branches 4–8 cm (1.6–3.1 in) long, containing 7–12 flowers held on pedicels. The pedicels are erect, with the lower ones 3–5 mm (0.12–0.20 in) long and the upper ones 2–3 mm (0.079–0.118 in) long.

The flowers have a calyx 5–6 mm (0.20–0.24 in) wide, and 6–8 mm (0.24–0.31 in) high, rounded below, with the tube 1–1.5 mm (0.039–0.059 in) long. The calyx segments are narrowly triangular-ovate, and are 3–5 mm (0.12–0.20 in) long by 2.5–3.5 mm (0.098–0.138 in) wide. The corolla is a pale greenish yellow, but it has a glaucous surface texture that makes it appear almost white, with it being 11–13 mm (0.43–0.51 in) long, and around 4 mm (0.16 in) wide at the base and 7–11 mm (0.28–0.43 in) wide above. The petals are shaped linear to lanceolate, with an acute tip, 2–2.5 mm (0.079–0.098 in) wide, connate 1–2 mm (0.039–0.079 in). The petals are strongly keeled, nearly straight, positioned erect to ascending but not touching much above the calyx.

The plant is said to bear a superficial resemblance to Dudleya linearis, native to San Benito Island.

== Taxonomy ==
=== Taxonomic history ===
In 1892, Dr. Francescho Franceschi, a horticulturist from Santa Barbara, visited Guadalupe Island. He published an account of the trip and the plants he found, and among them, he reported a "Cotyledon sp." on a rock by a trail not far from the landing. No other expeditions found or mentioned Dudleya until 1948, when Reid Moran and George Lindsay visited the island. The island had been decimated by feral goats that had been introduced by European sailors, which caused significant damage to the flora and left many plants only extant in areas where the goats could not reach. On the far northern portion of the island, where the Guadalupe pine grows, Moran and Lindsay found a clump of Dudleya growing on a north-facing cliff around 3,500 ft (1,100 m) above the sea, out of reach of the goats. Moran noted this plant's similarity to the Dudleya caespitosa found on the Californian coast, and the species on the northern end of Guadalupe would later be recognized as Dudleya virens subsp. extima.

The second population of Dudleya was discovered by Moran and Lindsay on Islote Afuera, a small islet off the southern coast of Guadalupe. The small islet is a volcanic cone with sheer vertical cliffs surrounded by tidal currents, but on the north side of the crater there is a small cove and a scalable slope. After failing to reach the islet with a skiff due to the dangerous conditions, Moran and Lindsay finally reached the cove with a rubber life raft, although they left their cameras behind due to the sheer danger of the landing. After overcoming the dangerous landing, Moran and Lindsay discovered what they regarded as the most interesting plant on the island, a species of Dudleya. Unlike the other plants on the northern end of the island, the plants on the islet had unusually dense green rosettes, with two different sizes of leaves. Another unusual feature was the twisting floral stem, which was present on all the plants. The peduncle is sinuously twisted, on both immature and dried inflorescences. After only one hour and a half of botanical work, Moran and Lindsay had to return to their ship, the Marviento, after the captain fired his gun to signal their return.

In 1955, George Lindsay supposedly saw plants on the rocks off of the north end of the island. In 1957, Reid Moran returned to Guadalupe Island, and found the typical green form of this species on Islote Negro, but also a white form covered in epicuticular wax. On Islote Negro, the plants occur occasionally, with the rosettes not as clustered but typically solitary or few, although some still formed clusters 40 cm wide. In August 1970, Moran also spotted this plant on Middle Rock.

In June of 2000, a team of Mexican and American botanists discovered this species on Islote de Adentro (or Islote Toro).

=== Phylogeny ===
Chromosome counts of the plants collected by Reid Moran on Islote Afuera and Islote Negro done by Dr. Charles H. Uhl indicate that all collections of the plant are diploid relative to the basic number for the genus, with a chromosome count of n = 17.

A 1985 paper alleged that a Dudleya of this species from Guadalupe Island had a chromosome count of 2n = 102, but Moran cast doubt on the author's specimens, as the authors failed to list a herbarium record. It is likely that the authors of the 1985 paper acquired the plant as a mislabeled Dudleya greenei, which is often mistakenly sold as Dudleya guadalupensis. The hypothesis that the authors of the 1985 paper got their plant as a mislabeled Dudleya greenei is further evidenced by the fact that greenei has a chromosome count of n = 51, which corresponds to the somatic count of 2n = 102.

Phylogenetic analyses have placed this species as sister to Dudleya virens subsp. extima, which occurs on the northern end of Guadalupe Island.

== Distribution and habitat ==
Dudleya guadalupensis is native to Guadalupe Island and the surrounding islets. The type specimen originates from Islote Afuera (Outer Islet), collected by Reid Moran. On Islote Afuera, the plants are common from the inner slope of the crater to the upper valley. The plants there have uniformly light green foliage. On Islote Negro, plants have both green and farinose foliage, with the rosettes being less clustered and more solitary. The species is present on Islote Adentro (Islote Toro). Plants have also been spotted on Middle Rock and other islets off of the island.

== Cultivation ==
Most of the examples of plants alleged to be this species in cultivation may be mislabeled. Noted Dudleya collector Paul Thomson observed that many of the plants in cultivation bear little resemble to actual D. guadalupensis plants. Reid Moran also notes that plants in the nursery trade labeled as D. guadalupensis are in fact D. greenei, a species native to the Channel Islands of California with a different chromosome count. Moran found that none of the collectors of the cultivated specimens could verify that the source was from Guadalupe Island.

== See also ==
- Dudleya virens
- Dudleya greenei
- Cistanthe guadalupensis
