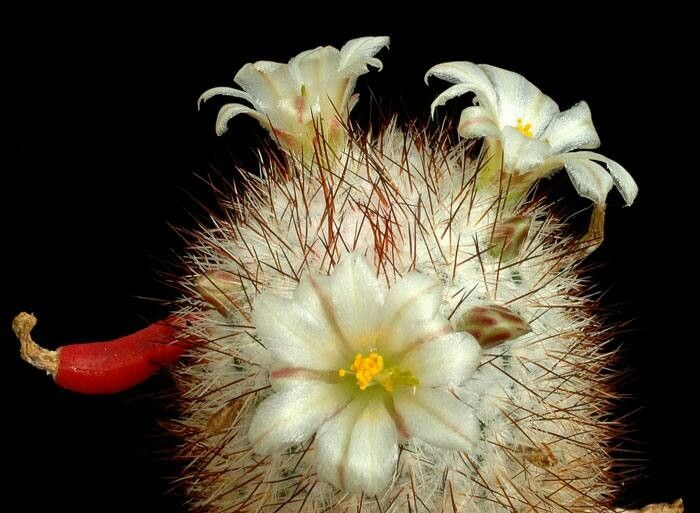

Conservation status
- Least Concern (IUCN 3.1)

Scientific classification
- Kingdom: Plantae
- Clade: Tracheophytes
- Clade: Angiosperms
- Clade: Eudicots
- Order: Caryophyllales
- Family: Cactaceae
- Subfamily: Cactoideae
- Genus: Cochemiea
- Species: C. palmeri

Binomial name
- Cochemiea palmeri (J.M.Coult.) P.B.Breslin & Majure

Synonyms
- Bartschella palmeri (J.M.Coult.) Doweld 2000; Cactus palmeri J.M.Coult. 1896; Chilita palmeri (J.M.Coult.) Orcutt 1926; Mammillaria dioica var. neopalmeri (R.T.Craig) Neutel. 1986; Mammillaria neopalmeri R.T.Craig 1945; Mammillaria palmeri (J.M.Coult.) Boed. 1936; Neomammillaria neopalmeri (R.T.Craig) Y.Itô 1981; Neomammillaria palmeri (J.M.Coult.) Britton & Rose 1923; Mammillaria dioica var. insularis K.Brandegee 1897

= Cochemiea palmeri =

Species of cactus

Cochemiea palmeri is a species of Cochemiea found in Mexico.

== Description ==
Cochemiea palmeri grows in groups with gray-green, elongated spherical shoots reaching 9 cm (3.5 in) in height and 5 cm (2.0 in) in diameter. The square-based, bluntly conical warts lack milky juice. The axillae are covered with white wool and short, twisted bristles. The plant has 3 to 5 straight or occasionally hooked central spines, brownish with dark tips, measuring 6 to 8 mm (0.24 to 0.31 in) long, and 25 to 30 slender, needle-like radial spines, white and 5 to 6 mm (0.20 to 0.24 in) long.

The flowers are light greenish-white or light cream-colored, sometimes with a pink touch, and measure 1 cm (0.39 in) across. The scarlet red, club-shaped fruits are up to 1.3 cm (0.51 in) long and contain black seeds.

== Distribution ==
Cochemiea palmeri is native to the Mexican state of Baja California, specifically on the islands of San Benito and Guadalupe from sea level to 300 meters growing along Dudleya linearis and Deinandra streetsii.

== Taxonomy ==
Originally described as Cactus palmeri by John Merle Coulter in 1894, the species was named in honor of botanist and archaeologist Edward Palmer. In 2021, Peter B. Breslin and Lucas C. Majure reclassified it into the genus Cochemiea.

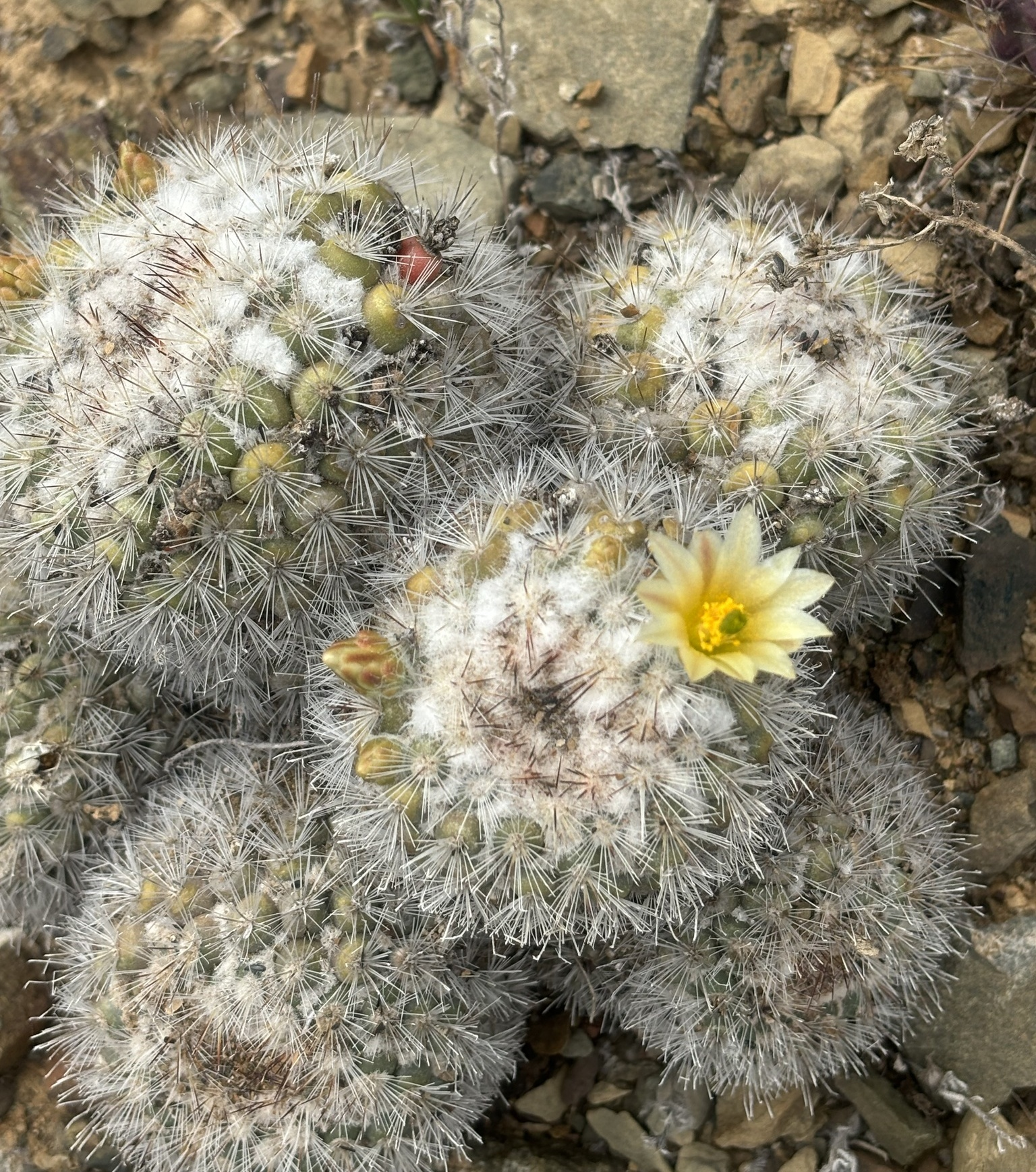
Plants blooming in habitat

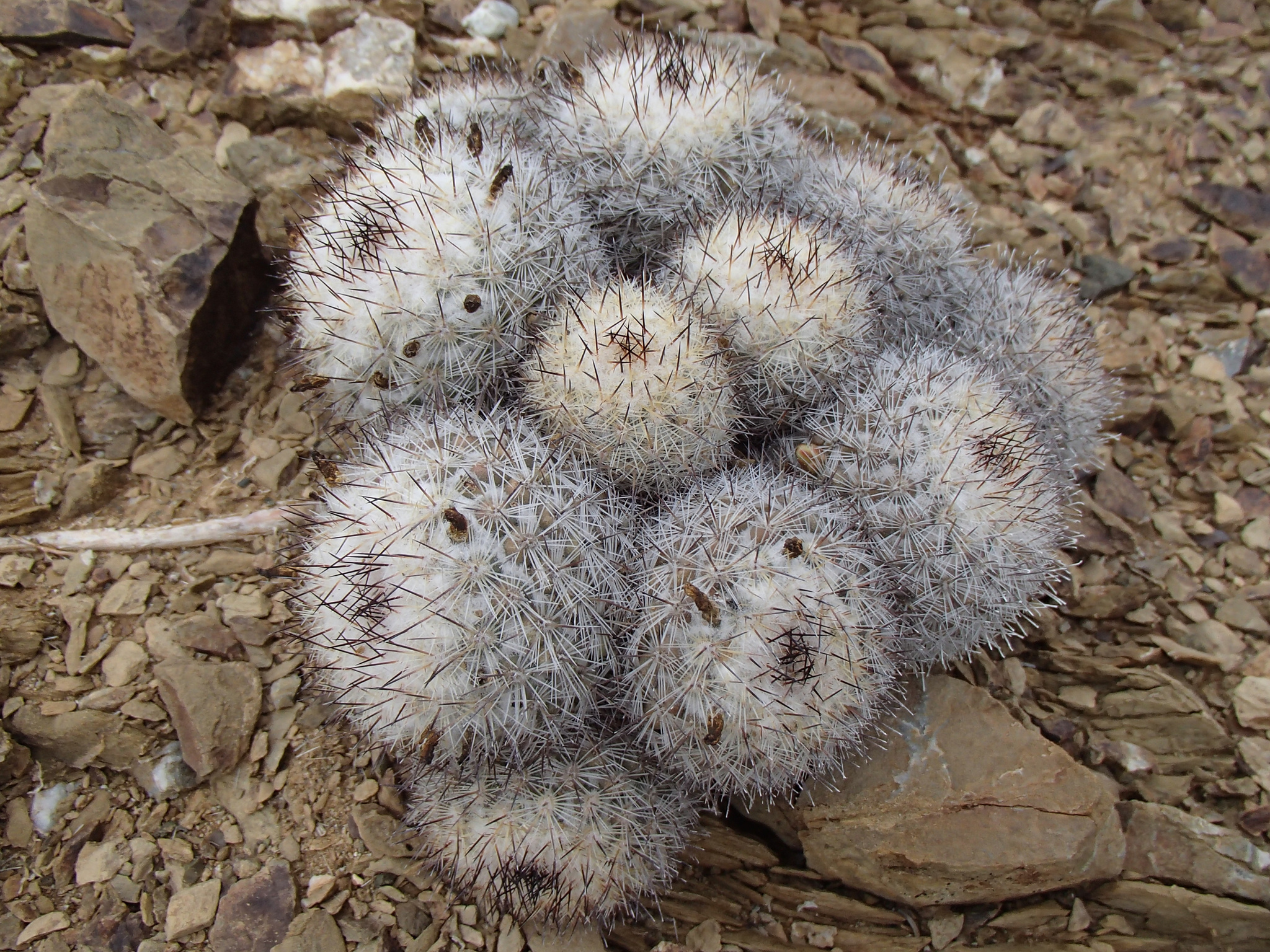
Plants growing in habitat in Mexico
