= Dudleya virens subsp. extima =

Scientific classification
- Kingdom: Plantae
- Clade: Embryophytes
- Clade: Tracheophytes
- Clade: Angiosperms
- Clade: Eudicots
- Order: Saxifragales
- Family: Crassulaceae
- Genus: Dudleya
- Species: D. virens
- Subspecies: D. v. subsp. extima

Trinomial name
- Dudleya virens subsp. extima Moran (1995)

Synonyms
- Stylophyllum virens subsp. extima Moran

Rare subspecies of succulent plant from Guadalupe Island

Dudleya virens subsp. extima is a subspecies of succulent plant in the family Crassulaceae commonly known as the Guadalupe green liveforever. It is a rosette-forming leaf succulent, with both green and white waxy foliage. It has white flowers with spreading petals that bloom from May to June. It is a somewhat small plant, continuing a southward trend of decreasing size relative to other Dudleya virens subspecies. This plant is endemic to Guadalupe Island in the eastern Pacific Ocean, which is 241 kilometers off of the Baja California coast. It is very rare, with this plant only surviving on sheer cliff faces and canyons, out of the reach of the former feral goat population rampant on the island. It closely resembles a miniature version of Dudleya virens subsp. virens, but it may be more nearly related to the local Dudleya guadalupensis.

== Description ==
Like most other Dudleya, it grows rosettes with succulent leaves on the tips of stems (which are variably referred to as a caudex). The caudex is 1 to 2.5 cm thick, either branching into clumps of up to 15 rosettes or elongating up to 30 cm. The rosettes are 5 to 15 cm wide, containing 15 to 55 crowded leaves.

The leaves are bright green or covered with white epicuticular wax (known as a farina). The leaf shape is linear to oblong-oblanceolate. The dimensions of the leaf range from 4 to 7 or rarely up to 17 cm long, 6 to 10 mm wide above when linear-shaped, but up to 15 mm wide above when oblanceolate, 8 to 15 mm wide at the base, and 2 to 4 mm thick.

The peduncle 5 to 20 cm tall, 2 to 5 mm thick, and often rather weak. The peduncle is bare of bracts in the lower 2 to 7 cm, but it has 12 to 35 ascending bracts above, which are shaped triangular to lanceolate. The inflorescence is 2 to 7 cm wide, composed of 2 to 4 ascending branches. The cincinni (terminal branches) bear 3 to 10 flowers, which are suspended on pedicels 1 to 6 mm long. Flowers are white with petals 7 to 10 mm long.

== Taxonomy ==
=== Taxonomic history ===
In 1892, Dr. Francescho Franceschi, a horticulturist from Santa Barbara, visited Guadalupe Island. He published an account of the trip and the plants he found, and among them, he reported a "Cotyledon sp." on a rock by a trail not far from the landing. No other expeditions found or mentioned Dudleya until 1948, when Reid Moran and George Lindsay visited the island. The island had been decimated by feral goats that had been introduced by European sailors, which caused significant damage to the flora and left many plants only extant in areas where the goats could not reach. On the far northern portion of the island, where the Guadalupe pine grows, Moran and Lindsay found a clump of Dudleya growing on a north-facing cliff around 3,500 ft (1,100 m) above the sea, out of reach of the goats. Moran noted this plant's similarity to the Dudleya caespitosa found on the Californian coast.

Moran and Lindsay continued returning to the island, eventually gathering more information on the Dudleya species that occurred on the northern cliffs and canyons. The first plant Moran noticed in 1948 was on what he called Hemizonia Cliff, and he later found more examples similar to it. The plants on Hemizonia Cliff have oblong to oblanceolate leaves covered in a white farina, and clustered, subsessile rosettes. Initially, the first plant collected on Hemizonia Cliff was a tetraploid, so Moran placed it with Dudleya virens subsp. hassei. Green, diploid plants with narrower and sharply acute leaves were discovered in the cliffs and canyons farther south, which Moran thought might make it feasible to distinguish these two taxa on the island. However, the second plant collected on Hemizonia Cliff turned out to be a diploid as well, so Moran kept all the plants under one subspecies, published and described in 1995.

=== Etymology ===
The subspecies name extima, means remote, with this subspecies of Dudleya virens growing the furthest from the North American continent. The true furthest out of the Dudleya is the closely related and nearby Dudleya guadalupensis, which occurs at the farther end of the island.

=== Phylogeny ===
Phylogenetic analyses have placed this plant as a probable sister taxon to Dudleya guadalupensis, which occurs on the southern end of Guadalupe Island and its islets.

== Distribution and habitat ==
It is endemic to Guadalupe Island, a volcanic island in the eastern Pacific Ocean belonging to Mexico. It is not on the continental shelf of North America, and is over 241 kilometers from the coast of Baja California. Plants are only found on the north and northeast half of the island, on steep, north-facing cliffs and canyons, and under rocks in the forest of Quercus tomentella. It is found in what Reid Moran called Hemizonia Cliff at 800 m (2,600 ft), the oak forest at 700 m (2,300 ft), Barracks Canyon at 450 to 420 m (1,480 to 1,380 ft), and Esparsa Canyon at 250 m (820 ft). It is scarce, but out of reach of the former goats, the plant appears to be surviving.
