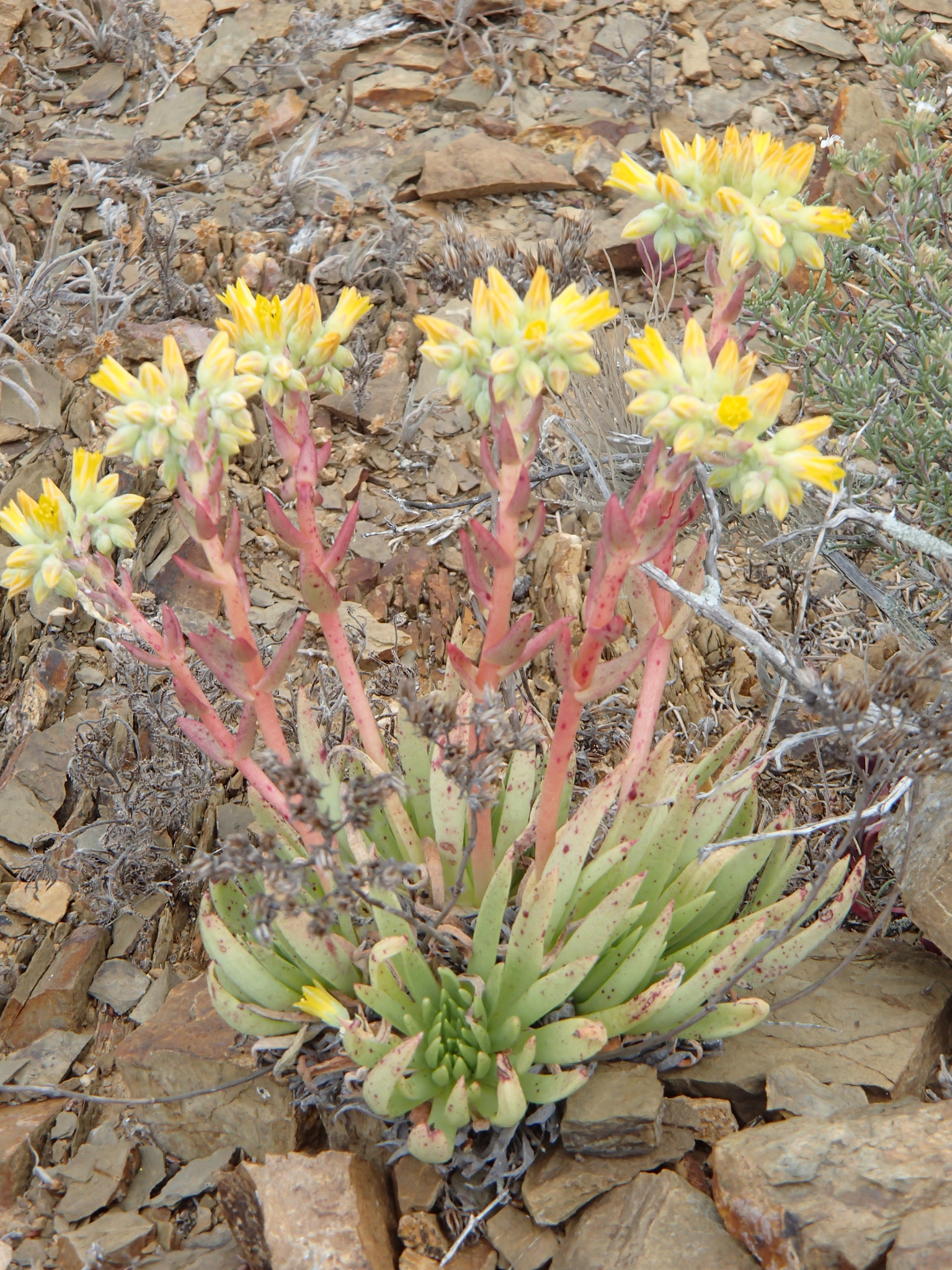
- A plant of Dudleya linearis in flower

Scientific classification
- Kingdom: Plantae
- Clade: Tracheophytes
- Clade: Angiosperms
- Clade: Eudicots
- Order: Saxifragales
- Family: Crassulaceae
- Genus: Dudleya
- Species: D. linearis

Binomial name
- Dudleya linearis (Greene) Britton & Rose
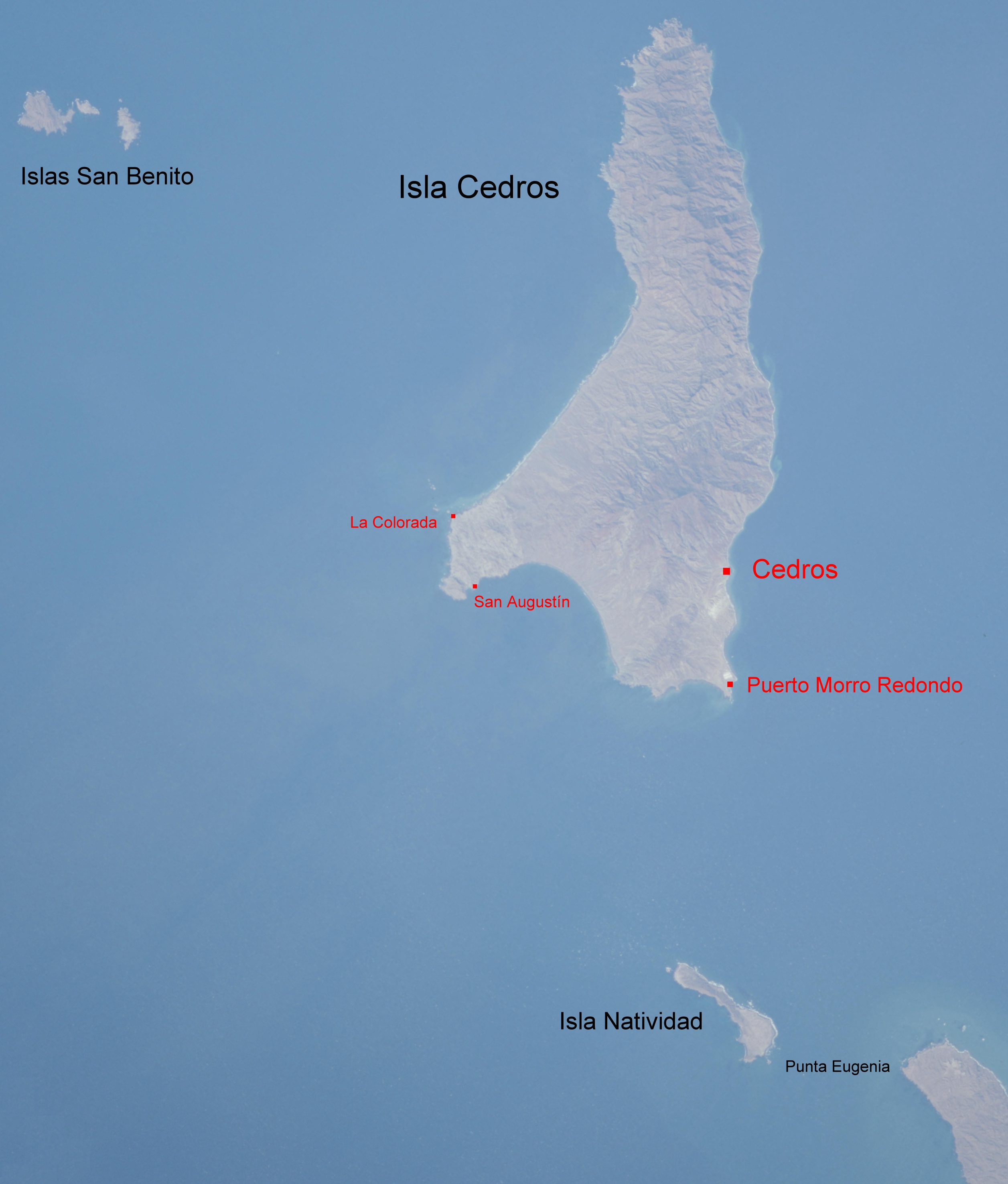
- Dudleya linearis is found on West San Benito Island, the furthest island at the top left of this image.

Synonyms
- Cotyledon linearis Greene; Echeveria linearis (Greene) A.Berger

= Dudleya linearis =

Species of succulent plant

Dudleya linearis is an insular succulent plant known by common name as the San Benitos liveforever. It is a rosette-forming perennial characterized by its long, flat green leaves on clustered heads and its yellow flowers. It is endemic to the western island of the Islas San Benito, a small Mexican archipelago in the Pacific Ocean west of Cedros Island. The limited population of the species is vulnerable, and has twice come close to extinction from introductions of grazing animals.

== Description ==
Dudleya linearis is a succulent perennial with long, flat green leaves in clustered rosettes and distinctive yellow flowers from March to May. The chromosome number is n=17, the base number for Dudleya.

Reid Moran noted that Dudleya linearis closely resembles, in vegetative form, Dudleya guadalupensis, endemic to Guadalupe Island to the northwest, based on their long, flat green leaves. The two can be separated by their significantly different inflorescences and flowers. Plants of Dudleya albiflora on Cedros Island have also been historically confused with this species.

=== Morphology ===
The caudices are caespitose, branching apically. They measure 1–2 cm in thickness. The branched caudices give the plants a cluster of 10 to 20 rosettes, which measure 2–5 cm in diameter. The rosettes have 20–40 leaves. The leaves are oriented in a erect or somewhat spreading manner. The leaves are light green and not glaucous. They measure 2.5–6 cm long by 5–10 mm wide and 2–3 mm thick. The leaf base is 5–8 mm wide. The leaf shape is linear or oblong to oblong-oblanceolate, and the tip is acuminate to sharply acute.

The peduncle is 6–17 cm tall and is 1.5–2 mm thick. The inflorescence is glaucous and compact, and is composed of 2 to 3 simple branches. The terminal branches (cincinni) measure 2–5 cm long and are ascending. The cincinni bear 2–10 flowers, borne on erect pedicels, the lowermost pedicels 2–6 mm long. There are only 5–8 bracts on the peduncle, the lower two-thirds or lower third being absent of them. The bracts have an ascending orientation, and are shaped lanceolate with an acute apex. The lowermost bracts measure 5–20 mm long by 2–9 mm wide and are usually in a subopposite arrangement.

The calyx measure 3–4.5 mm wide by 4–6 mm high. The sepals are 2.5–4 mm long and are shaped triangular-lanceolate. The petals are 7–12 mm long and 2.5 mm wide, and are connate for 1.5–2.5 mm. The petals are yellow. The carpels are erect and appressed.

== Taxonomy ==
=== Taxonomic history ===
Dudleya linearis was discovered on West San Benito Island by Lieutenant C.F. Pond, and described by Edward Lee Greene in 1889 as Cotyledon linearis in Pittonia.

In 1903, the botanists Nathaniel Lord Britton and Joseph Nelson Rose created the new genus Dudleya, named in honor of William Russel Dudley, which absorbed most of the Cotyledon species described in California and the Baja California Peninsula under the new genus, creating the combination Dudleya linearis.

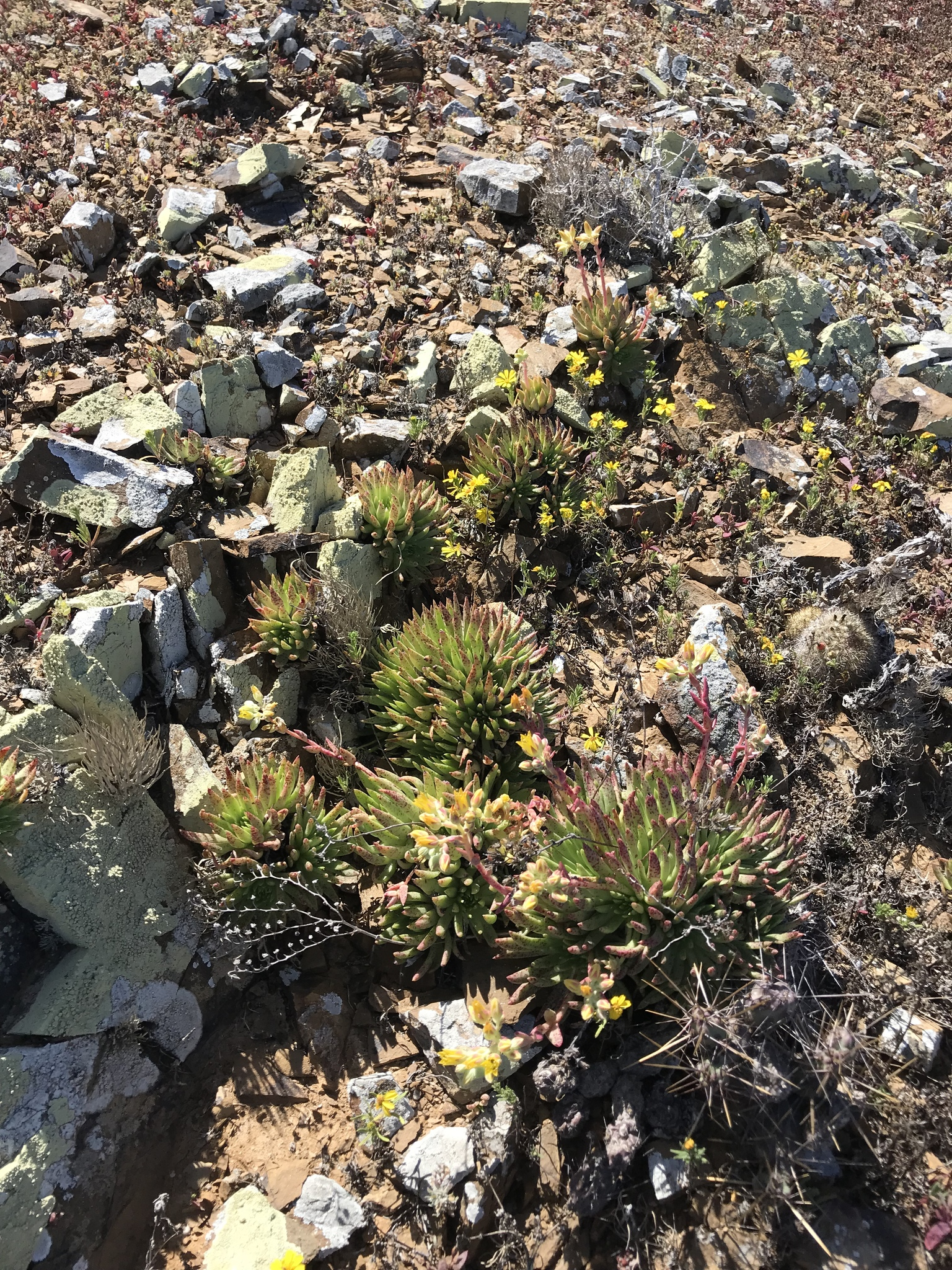
Plants of Dudleya linearis in habitat, flowering

In 1930, Alwin Berger, who worked within the Engler system of plant taxonomy, recombined a number of the new species created by Britton and Rose into Echeveria, creating the combination Echeveria linearis.

== Distribution and habitat ==
Dudleya linearis is endemic to West San Benito Island, the largest of the San Benito Islands, an archipelago west of Cedros Island. It is somewhat scarce, and is found on canyon walls and slopes on the north side of the island. The plant is not present on the eastern or middle islands.

== Conservation ==
West San Benito is home to a small community of fishermen, up to 70 seasonally, who live in a settlement on the east side of the island.

When botanist Reid Moran visited the island in 1948, he was only able to find a few living plants and large numbers of dead ones, with only 3 flowering plants that year. Donkeys had been introduced to West San Benito as pack animals, and brought D. linearis close to extinction. Small groups of feral donkeys were still seen on the island from 1975–1992. The donkey population is now corralled and fed imported food, posing little threat to the Dudleya.

In 1990s, rabbits and goats were brought to island, possibly by the lighthouse keeper or fishermen. The rabbits devastated the population of D. linearis, nearly to the point of extirpation. In 1998, conservation groups and the Mexican government started a program to remove rabbits and goats from the island. A hunter with his Jack Russell Terrier named "Freckles" was hired to eliminate the rabbits. Over 400 rabbits were hunted or trapped over a 7 month period. The elimination of the rabbits and goats, along with an El Niño year, led to the rebound of the D. linearis population.
