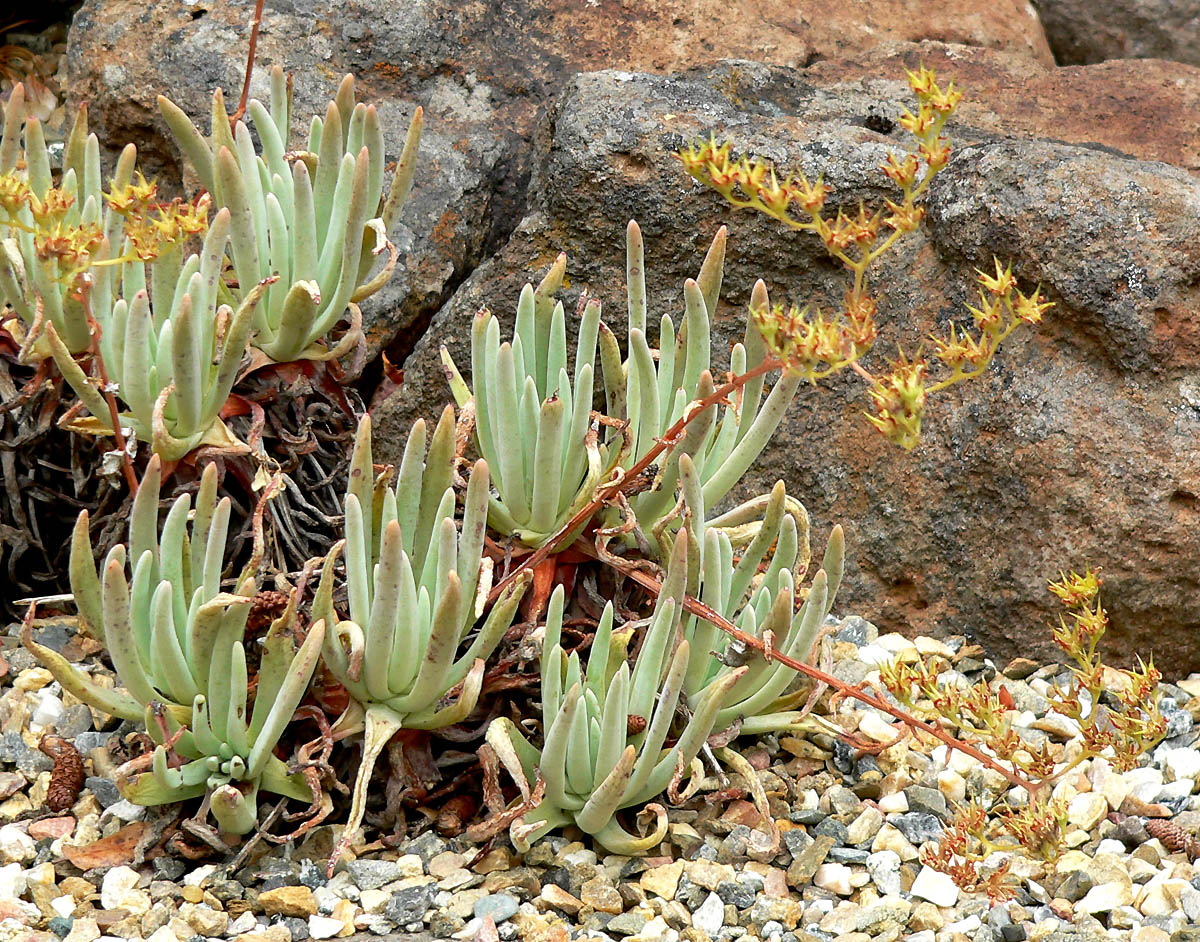
- Dudleya virens ssp. hassei

Scientific classification
- Kingdom: Plantae
- Clade: Tracheophytes
- Clade: Angiosperms
- Clade: Eudicots
- Order: Saxifragales
- Family: Crassulaceae
- Genus: Dudleya
- Species: D. virens

Binomial name
- Dudleya virens (Rose) Moran

Synonyms
- Cotyledon albida (Rose) Fedde; Cotyledon hassei (Rose) Fedde; Cotyledon insularis (Rose) Fedde; Cotyledon virens (Rose) Fedde; Dudleya hassei (Rose) Moran; Dudleya insularis (Rose) P.H. Thomson; Echeveria hassei (Rose) A.Berger; Echeveria insularis (Rose) A.Berger; Echeveria virens (Rose) A.Berger; Stylophyllum insulare Rose

= Dudleya virens =

Green liveforever

Species of succulent

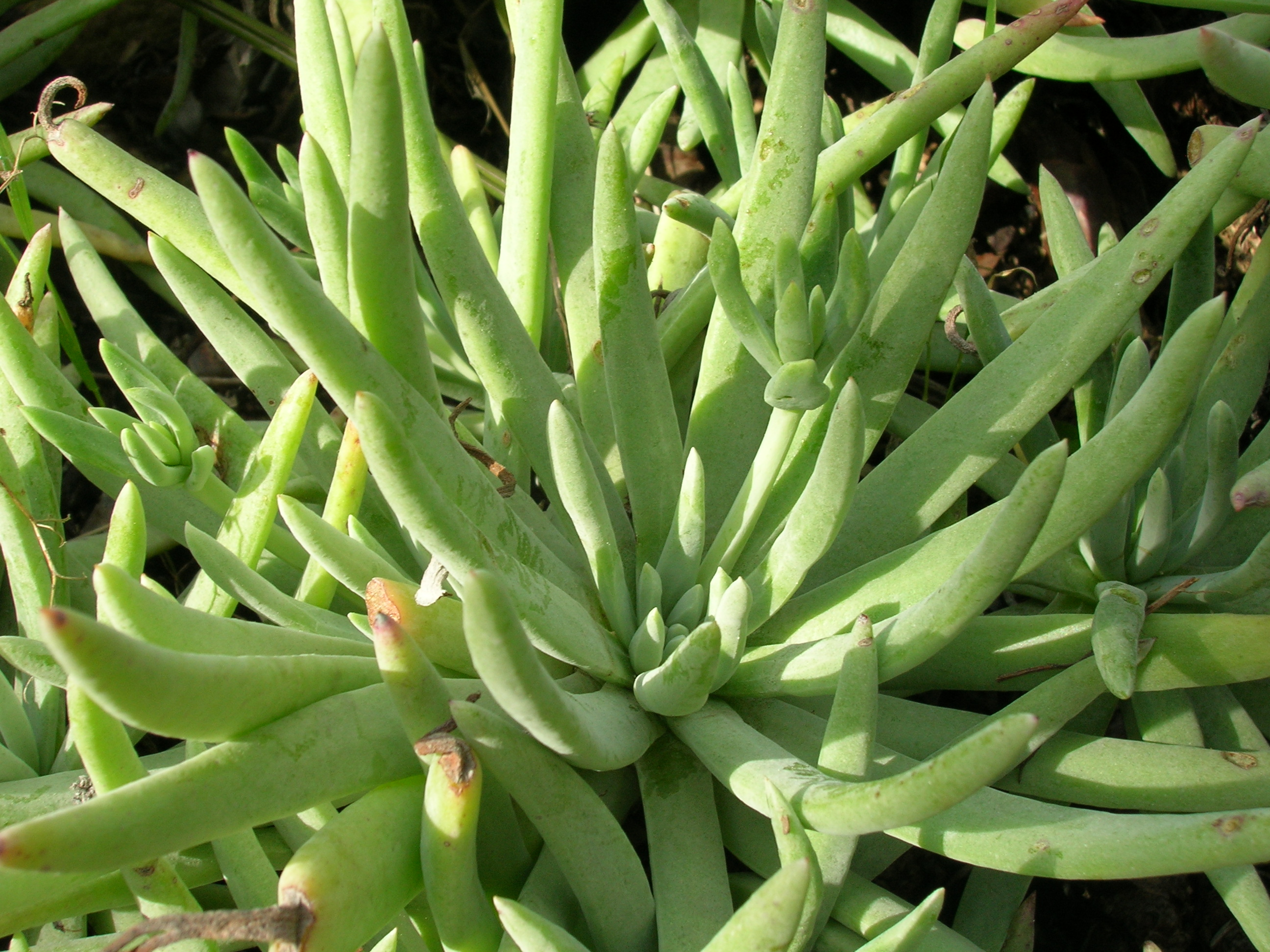
Foliage.

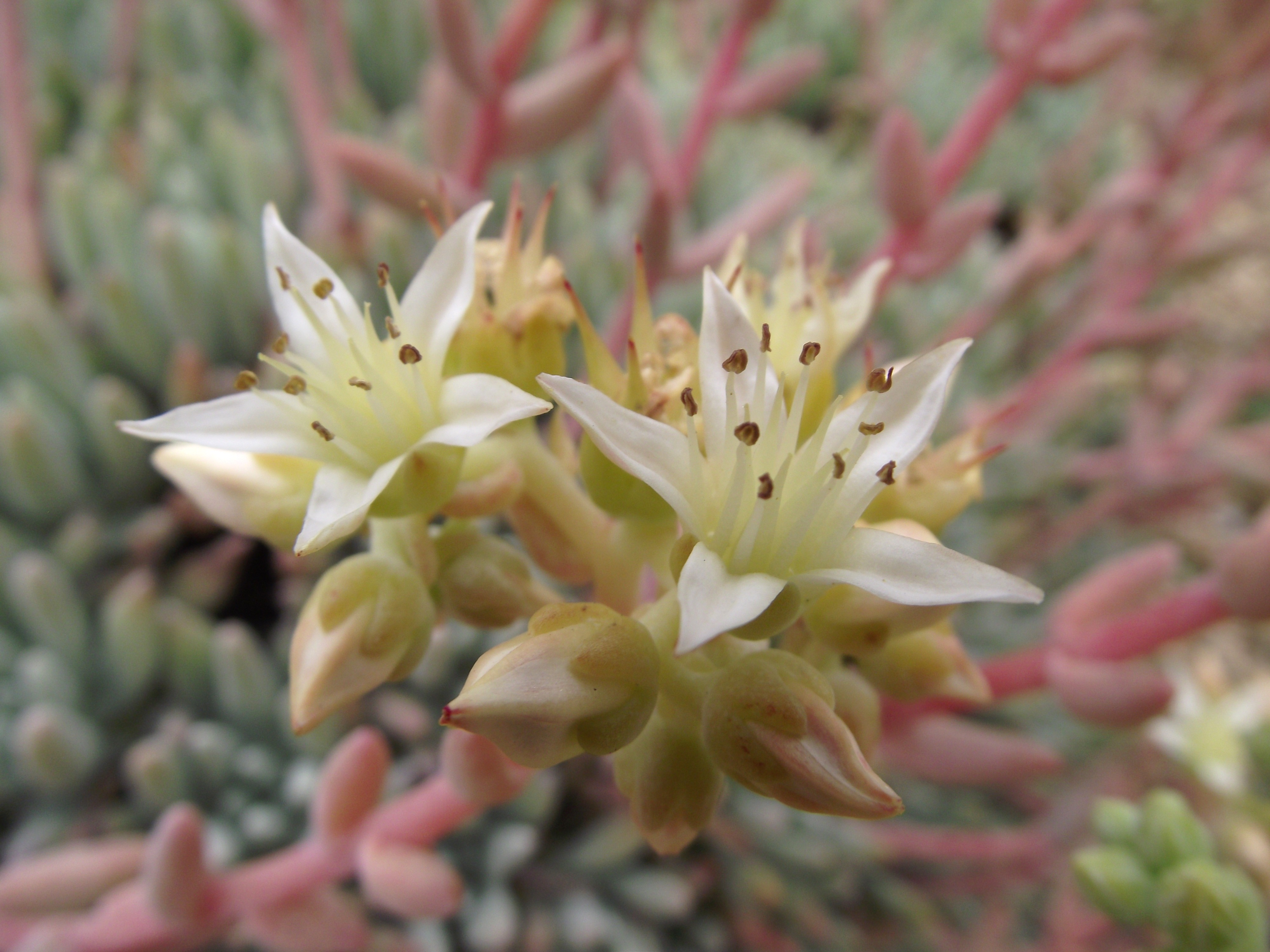
Flower.

Dudleya virens, the green liveforever or bright green dudleya, is an uncommon species of perennial, succulent plant in the family Crassulaceae, native to several coastal southern California and Baja California locations.

== Distribution ==
The succulent is found growing in the Palos Verdes Hills on the Palos Verdes Peninsula coast in Los Angeles County; on several of the Channel Islands in California; and on Guadalupe Island off the northwestern Baja California Peninsula, Mexico.

== Description ==
Dudleya virens leaves are fleshy and strap-shaped, 8–20 cm long and 1.5–3 cm broad, tapering from the base (or from near middle) and are mostly green. They are arranged in a rosette.

The flowers are white, with five petals 7–10 mm long. They are produced in April, May, and June. Hummingbirds visit the flowers for their nectar.

=== Subspecies ===
Name	Authority	Common name	Distribution	Image
Species Dudleya virens (Rose) Moran
D. v. subsp. extima
subsp. extima	Moran	Guadalupe green liveforever	Endemic to Guadalupe Island	
Caudex 1 to 2.5 cm thick, either branching into clumps of up to 15 rosettes or elongating up to 30 cm. Rosettes are 5 to 15 cm wide, containing 15 to 55 crowded leaves. Leaves are bright green or glaucous. Leaf shape is linear to oblong-oblanceolate, 4 to 7 or rarely up to 17 cm long, 6 to 10 mm wide above when linear but up to 15 mm wide above when oblanceolate, 8 to 15 mm wide at the base and 2 to 4 mm thick. Peduncle 5 to 20 cm tall, 2 to 5 mm thick, inflorescence 2 to 7 cm wide, composed of 2 to 4 ascending branches. Flowers are white with petals 7 to 10 mm long. Chromosomes n = 17, 34.
D. v. subsp. hassei
subsp. hassei syn. Stylophyllum hassei syn. Cotyledon hassei syn. Echeveria hassei syn. Dudleya hassei	(Rose) Moran Rose in Britton & Rose (Rose) Fedde (Rose) Berger (Rose) Moran	Catalina Island liveforever	Endemic to Santa Catalina Island.	
Caudex 1 to 3 cm thick, branching into clumps 1 m wide. Rosettes are 4 to 8 cm wide, containing 15 to 30 erect leaves. Leaves are generally glaucous, but rarely can be green. Leaf shape is linear-oblong to linear-lanceolate and 5 to 10 cm long, 2 to 4 mm thick. Peduncle 10 to 30 cm tall, inflorescence branching into 2 to 4 close set or once bifurcate branches. Flowers are white with petals 8 to 10 mm long. Chromosomes n = 34.
D. v. subsp. insularis
subsp. insularis syn. Stylophyllum insulare syn. Cotyledon insularis syn. Cotyledon viscida var. insularis syn. Echeveria insularis syn. Echeveria viscida var. insularis syn. Dudleya insularis	(Rose) Moran Rose in Britton & Rose (Rose) Fedde (Rose) S. Watson (Rose) Berger (S. Watson) Berger (Rose) P. H. Thomson	Island green dudleya	Occurs in the Palos Verdes Hills, Santa Catalina and San Nicolas islands.	
Caudex 2 to 6 cm thick, up to 1 m long, branching into clumps 2 m wide. Rosettes are 10 to 25 cm wide, containing 20 to 50 spreading to erect leaves. Leaves sometimes glaucous, sometimes green. Leaf shape is triangular-lanceolate, 6 to 25 cm long and 10 to 32 mm wide above, 2 to 4 cm wide at the base, with an obtuse tip. Peduncle 6 to 70 cm tall, 5 to 15 mm thick. Flowers are white with red to orange keels, petals 8 to 10 mm long. Chromosomes n = 17.
D. v. subsp. virens
subsp. virens syn. Stylophyllum virens syn. Cotyledon virens syn. Echeveria virens syn. Dudleya virens syn. Stylophyllum albida syn. Cotyledon albida syn. Echeveria albida syn. Dudleya albida	(Rose) Moran Rose in Britton & Rose (Rose) Fedde (Rose) Berger (Rose) Moran Rose in Britton & Rose (Rose) Fedde (Rose) Berger (Rose) P. H. Thomson	Bright green dudleya Alabaster plant	Endemic to San Clemente Island.	
Caudex 1 to 3.2 cm wide, branching into clumps at least 40 cm wide. Rosettes are 5 to 10 cm wide, containing 20 to 50 leaves. Leaves are usually green, rarely glaucous. Leaf shape is triangular-lanceolate to linear-lanceolate, 3 to 10 cm long and 10 to 15 mm wide above, 1.5 to 3 cm wide at the base, with an acute tip. Peduncle is 7 to 46 cm long, 4 to 7 mm thick, inflorescence 6 to 15 cm wide with 3 to 4 close-set branches towards the apex. Flowers are white with red to orange keels, petals 8 to 10 mm long. Chromosomes n = 17.

There has been some developing arguments on how to best categorize the various subspecies of Dudleya virens. The division stems from the fact that the current groupings of the Dudleya virens subspecies are polyphyletic as opposed to monophyletic. The overall evolutionary history of Dudleya virens has been difficult to pin down which has contributed to the confusion surrounding the clarification of the subspecies. This has led to some researchers suggesting that the white leafed sub species of should be separated into its own species that is distinct from the green colored subspecies, although this theory is not backed with any DNA results.

== Cultivation ==
Dudleya virens is cultivated as an ornamental plant in the specialty native plants and succulents horticulture trade. It is used in containers, drought tolerant landscapes, and habitat gardens. It prefers well-draining soil, and grows best in full sun or light shade.

== Endangerment and Conservation ==
=== Poaching and predation ===
Dudleya virens has been specifically affected by the surge in Dudleya poaching to be sold in a similar way to Dudleya farinosa which was covered in the 2021 documentary "Plant Heist". Where Dudleya virens plants are illegally harvested and shipped to regions of Asia to be sold for profit as medicine or as a pot plant. The succulent is also threatened by invasive grazing animal species that were introduced during the colonization of the Americas. These animals over consume the plants. The poaching by people and predation by invasive species has led to Dudleya virens, specifically Dudleya virens spp. insularis, to be ranked a 1B.2 in terms of rarity (rare, threatened, or endangered) by the state of California.

=== Conservation ===
Through consorted conservation efforts, Dudleya virens has been able to make a considerable ecological come back from its previously concerning status. One of the major factors in their successful rehabilitation has been the removal of invasive grazing species: rabbits, horse, and pigs that were introduced during the colonization of California. These animals tend to over consume several Dudleya virens subspecies throughout the Channel Islands. The other major factor is that California passed a bill that makes poaching Dudleya virens with an intent to sell a fineable offense. The removal of these invasive grazers and the crackdown on succulent poaching has created the conditions necessary for Dudleya virens to recover across the Channel Islands.
