= Palos Verdes Hills =

Mountain range in Southern California

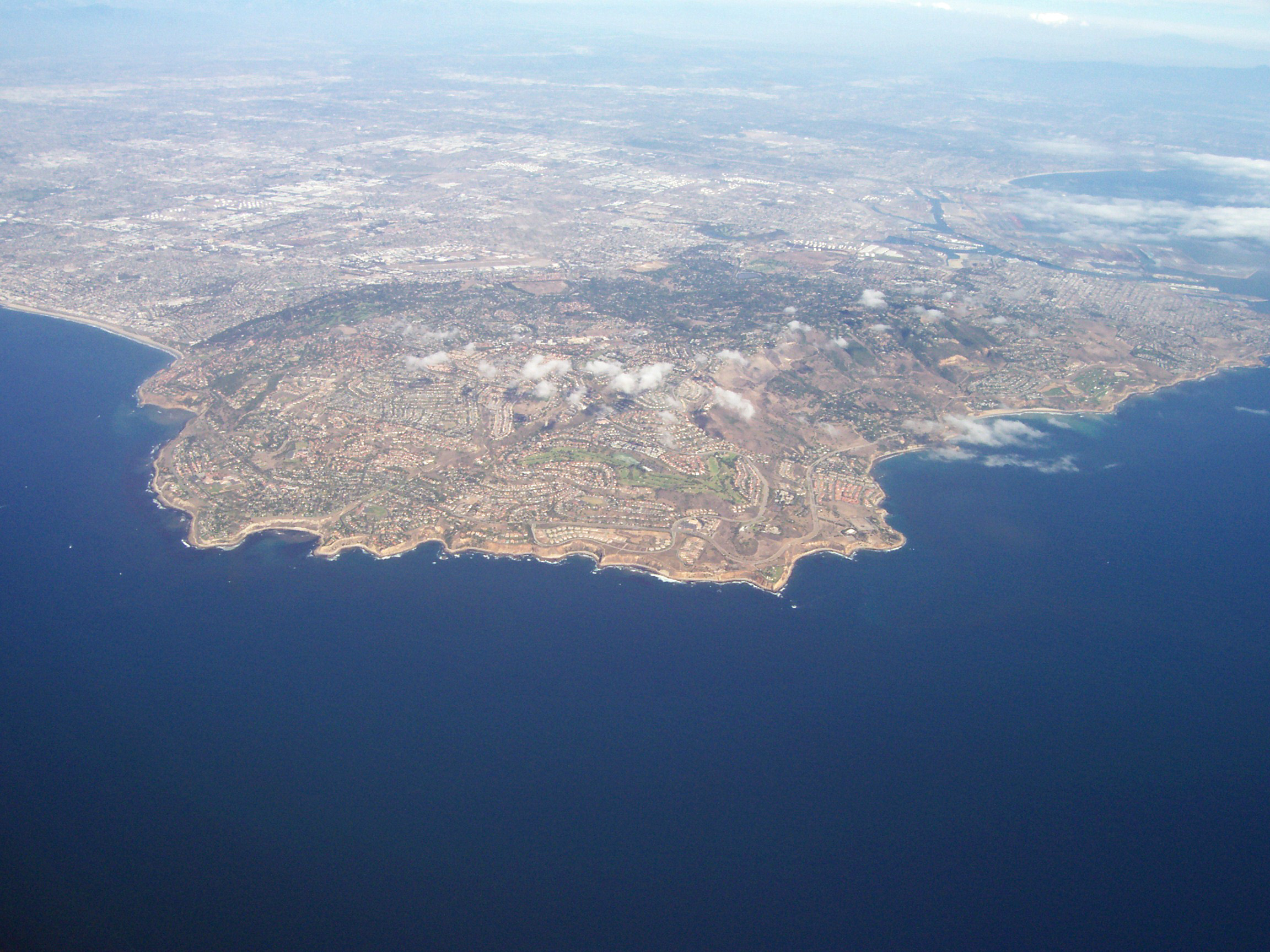
- The Palos Verdes Hills atop the Palos Verdes Peninsula, extending into the Pacific Ocean at the southwest corner of Los Angeles County.

Highest point
- Peak: San Pedro Hill
- Elevation: 1,457 ft (444 m)

Geography
- Location within California Location within the United States
- Country: United States
- State: California
- District: Los Angeles County
- Range coordinates: 33°44′50″N 118°20′9″W
- Topo map: USGS San Pedro

The Palos Verdes Hills are a low mountain range on the southwestern coast of Los Angeles County, California. They lie on the Palos Verdes Peninsula, a subregion of the Los Angeles metropolitan area. Historically, the hills used to be referred to as the San Pedro Hills, named after the nearby Rancho San Pedro.

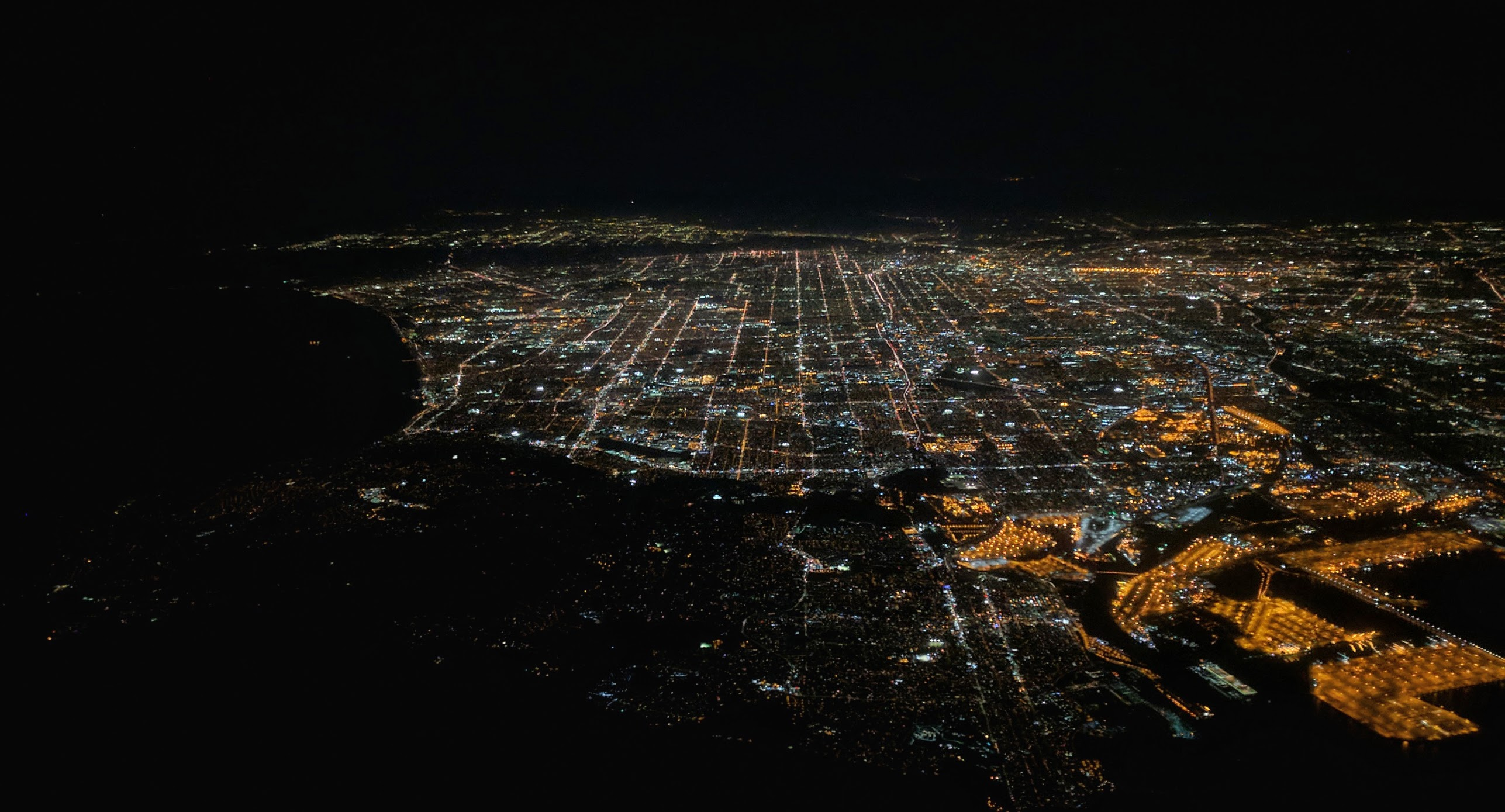
In this night-time aerial photograph of Los Angeles, San Pedro is in the center and right foreground, including part of the brightly lit Terminal Island. The dark peninsula to the left of San Pedro is Palos Verdes.

The Palos Verdes Hills are the landed end of the Channel Islands of California, a mountains formation in the Transverse Ranges System.

== Portuguese Bend ==
The Portuguese Bend Landslide area of the Palos Verdes Hills is geologically unstable and is unsuitable for building. However it is a natural research laboratory for the study of island biogeography and evolutionary ecology. The geographical location and geological history of the hills make the remaining coastal sage scrub habitat at Portuguese Bend extremely valuable for ecological and other scientific reasons. The Palos Verdes Peninsula, which was an island with the Palos Verdes Hills in recent geological time, has close floral and faunal similarities to the Channel Islands.

A species of the succulent live-forever, Bright green dudleya or Dudleya virens, is endemic to the Channel Islands and the Palos Verdes Peninsula.

== Features ==
The hills are the location of suburban communities and cities together known as Palos Verdes, and include Palos Verdes Estates, Rancho Palos Verdes, San Pedro, gated Rolling Hills, and Rolling Hills Estates.

The Wayfarers Chapel was a transparent glass chapel within a planted Coast redwood forest, designed in 1951 by the renowned architect and landscape architect Lloyd Wright. Located on a bluff above the Pacific Ocean, it was affiliated with the Swedenborgian Church, and was a well-known local landmark on the National Register of Historic Places in Los Angeles County. After earth movement damaged the building and surrounding site in 2024, the decision was made to carefully deconstruct the structure in order to preserve as much as possible, in collaboration with historic preservation experts and the National Park Service, with hopes of finding a new site.

The large and diverse Los Angeles County South Coast Botanic Garden is located in the central Palos Verdes Hills. It is an 87-acre (35-hectare) landscaped botanical garden, event venue, and arboretum with over 150,000 landscape plants and trees from California and around the world.
