= 515th Bombardment Squadron =

- EB-47 Stratojet in 376th Bombardment Wing markings
- Active: 1942–1945; 1958–1962
- Country: United States
- Branch: United States Air Force
- Role: Bombardment
- Engagements: Mediterranean Theater of Operations
- Decorations: Distinguished Unit Citation

Insignia
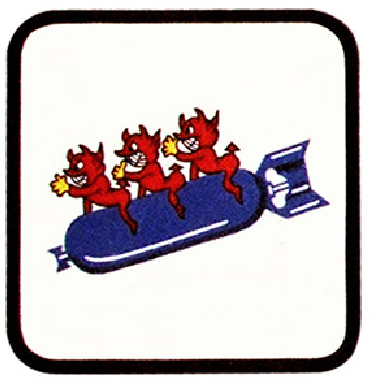
- 515th Bombardment Squadron emblem (Note: Approved 6 January 1944. Description: On a white square, corners rounded, border black, three red imps of Satan, riding a large light blue aerial bomb, nose toward dexter base.)

The 515th Bombardment Squadron is an inactive United States Air Force unit. It was first formed in the Middle East in 1942 to reinforce the Royal Air Force in North Africa with personnel and aircraft diverted from delivery to the China Burma India Theater. The squadron moved forward, eventually being stationed in Italy, where it participated in the strategic bombing campaign against Germany, and was awarded three Distinguished Unit Citations for its combat actions. Following V-E Day, the squadron returned to the United States, where it converted to Boeing B-29 Superfortress bombers, but was inactivated in March 1946.

The squadron was reactivated at Lockbourne Air Force Base, Ohio in 1958, when Strategic Air Command (SAC) reorganized its Boeing B-47 Stratojet wings to have four squadrons. It was inactivated on 1 January 1962, when SAC alert posture was changed and no longer fit the four squadron model.

== History ==
=== World War II ===
==== Background ====
In early 1942, the Afrika Corps was threatening British forces in Egypt. In response, two contingents of American heavy bombers were diverted to support the Royal Air Force. A flight of Consolidated B-24 Liberators being ferried to India was halted from its travel in June and some Boeing B-17 Flying Fortresses from the 9th and 436th Bombardment Squadrons were flown to the Middle East from India. On 20 July 1942, these elements were organized into the 1st Provisional Group at RAF Lydda, Palestine.

==== North African operations ====
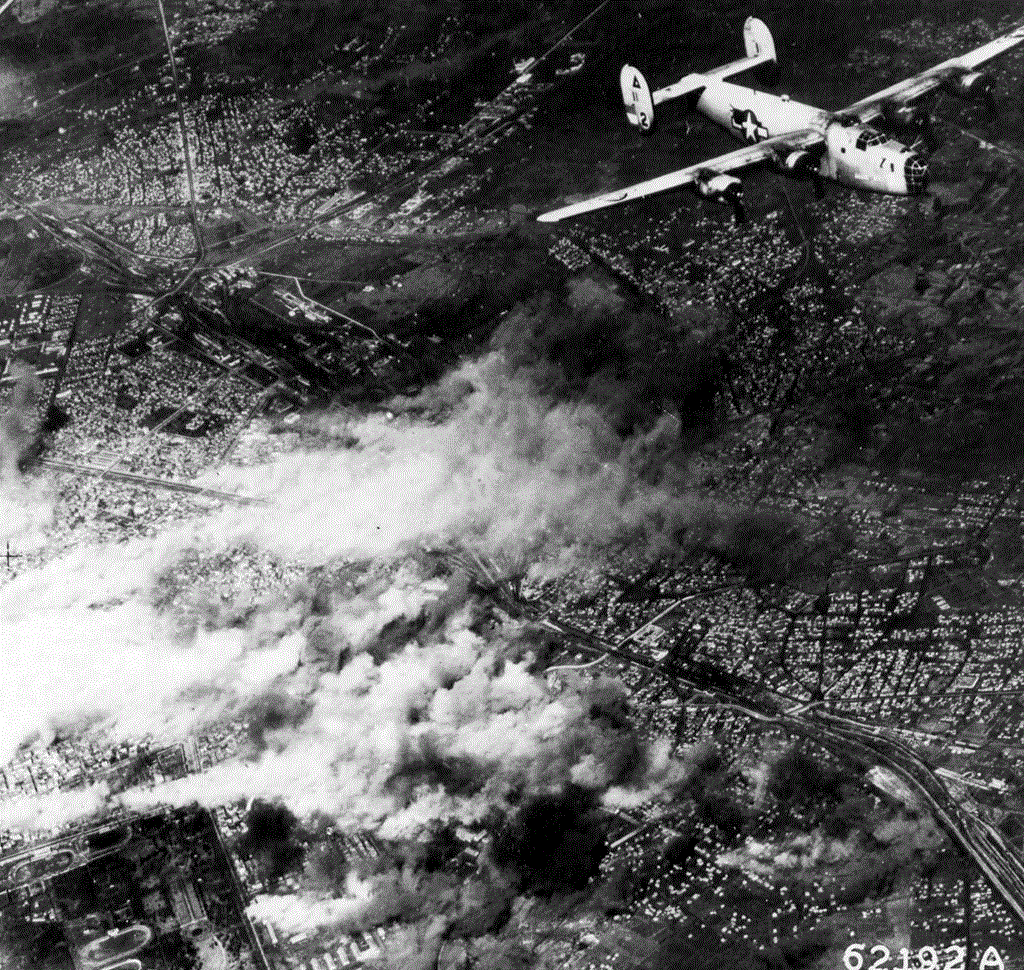
376th Group B-24 on a bombing mission to Bulgaria on 1 June 1944

On 31 October 1942, the 1st Group was dissolved and replaced by a formal Army Air Forces unit, the 376th Bombardment Group. The 515th Bombardment Squadron was activated as one of its four component squadrons. The squadron was originally equipped with a mix of Liberators and Flying Fortresses, but by the end of the year, the B-17s were transferred to Twelfth Air Force and the squadron became an all B-24 unit.

Moving forward to bases in Egypt and Libya, the squadron attacked shipping in the Mediterranean and harbor installations in Libya, Tunisia, Sicily, and Italy to cut enemy supply lines to North Africa. After the fall of Tunisia in May 1943, the squadron focused on attacks on aerodromes, marshalling yards, and other objectives in Sicily and Italy, moving forward to Enfidaville Airfield, Tunisia in late September. Its actions during these attacks on enemy targets from its activation through August 1943 earned the squadron its first Distinguished Unit Citation (DUC).

On 1 August 1943, operating from Benina Airport, Libya, the squadron participated in Operation Tidal Wave, the low level attack on oil refineries near Ploesti, with the squadron's parent group leading the attack formation. As it approached its assigned targets, the lead aircraft realized that an order from the group commander, who had misidentified the initial point, put the group off course. The group attempted an attack on the Romana Americana refinery, its assigned objective from a different direction. By this time, enemy air defenses had been alerted and intense flak forced the unit to attack targets of opportunity. The squadron was awarded its second DUC for this operation.

==== Strategic bombing campaign ====
The squadron moved to San Pancrazio Airfield, Italy in November 1943, where it became part of Fifteenth Air Force and would remain until April 1945. It primarily flew long range strategic bombardment missions to targets in Italy, France, Germany, Czechoslovakia, Austria, Hungary, and the Balkans to bomb factories, marshalling yards, oil refineries, oil storage facilities, airdromes, bridges, harbors, and other objectives. On 16 June 1944, it received a third DUC for an attack on oil industry targets in Bratislava. The squadron also provided air support for Operation Shingle, the landings at Anzio and flew interdiction missions to support the Battle of Monte Cassino between February and March 1944. In the fall of 1944, it assisted the Red Army in its advance through the Balkans, and in early 1945, supported Operation Grapeshot, the spring offensive in Northern Italy. The squadron was withdrawn from combat in April 1945 and left Italy for the United States.

The squadron arrived at Harvard Army Air Field, Nebraska in May 1945 and the 376th Group began conversion to the Boeing B-29 Superfortress. However, B-29 groups were organized with three squadrons, rather than the four squadrons of B-24 groups, and the 515th was inactivated on 24 June 1945.

=== Strategic Air Command ===
From 1958, the Boeing B-47 Stratojet wings of Strategic Air Command (SAC) began to assume an alert posture at their home bases, reducing the amount of time spent on alert at overseas bases. The SAC alert cycle divided itself into four parts: planning, flying, alert and rest to meet General Thomas S. Power's initial goal of maintaining one third of SAC's planes on fifteen minute ground alert, fully fueled and ready for combat to reduce vulnerability to a Soviet missile strike. To implement this new system the B-47 wings were expanded from three to four squadrons. The 515th was activated at Lockbourne Air Force Base as part of the 376th Bombardment Wing on 1 December 1958.

Although designated a bombardment squadron, electronic countermeasures was the unit's primary mission. SAC's alert commitment was increased to half the squadron's aircraft in 1962 and the four squadron pattern no longer met the alert cycle commitment, so the squadron was inactivated on 1 January 1962.

== Lineage ==
- Constituted as the 515th Bombardment Squadron (Heavy) on 19 October 1942

Activated on 31 October 1942
Redesignated 515th Bombardment Squadron, Heavy on 3 May 1944
Inactivated on 24 June 1945
Redesignated 515th Bombardment Squadron, Medium on 20 August 1958
Activated on 1 December 1958
Discontinued and inactivated on 1 January 1962

=== Assignments ===
- 376th Bombardment Group, 31 October 1942 – 24 June 1945
- 376th Bombardment Wing, 1 December 1958 – 1 January 1962

=== Stations ===
- RAF Lydda, Palestine, 31 October 1942
- RAF Abu Sueir, Egypt, 8 November 1942
- RAF Gambut, Libya, 10 February 1943
- Soluch Airfield, Libya, 25 February 1943
- Benina Airport, Libya, 16 April 1943
- Enfidaville Airfield, Tunisia, c. 26 September 1943 (detachment operated from Benina Airport, Libya, 3–11 October 1943)
- San Pancrazio Airfield, Italy, 19 November 1943 – 19 April 1945
- Harvard Army Air Field, Nebraska, 8 May – 24 June 1945
- Lockbourne Air Force Base, Ohio, 1 December 1958 – 1 January 1962

=== Aircraft ===
- Boeing B-17 Flying Fortress (1942)
- Consolidated B-24 Liberator (1942–1945)
- Boeing B-47 Stratojet, 1958–1962

=== Awards and campaigns ===
Award streamer	Award	Dates	Notes
	Distinguished Unit Citation	November 1942 – 17 August 1943	North Africa and Sicily
	Distinguished Unit Citation	1 August 1943	Ploesti, Romania
	Distinguished Unit Citation	16 June 1944	Bratislava, Czechoslovakia

Campaign Streamer	Campaign	Dates	Notes
	Air Offensive, Europe	31 October 1942 – 5 June 1944	
	Air Combat, EAME Theater	31 October 1942 – 11 May 1945	
	Egypt-Libya	31 October 1942 – 12 February 1943	
	Tunisia	12 November 1942 – 13 May 1943	
	Sicily	14 May 1943 – 17 August 1943	
	Naples-Foggia	18 August 1943 – 21 January 1944	
	Anzio	22 January 1944 – 24 May 1944	
	Rome-Arno	22 January 1944 – 9 September 1944	
	Central Europe	22 March 1944 – 18 April 1945	
	Normandy	6 June 1944 – 24 July 1944	
	Northern France	25 July 1944 – 14 September 1944	
	Southern France	15 August 1944 – 14 September 1944	
	North Apennines	10 September 1944 – 4 April 1945	
	Rhineland	15 September 1944 – 21 March 1945	
	Po Valley	3 April 1945 – 18 April 1945	

== See also ==
- List of United States Air Force bomb squadrons
- List of B-47 units of the United States Air Force
- Boeing B-17 Flying Fortress Units of the Mediterranean Theater of Operations
- B-24 Liberator units of the United States Army Air Forces
