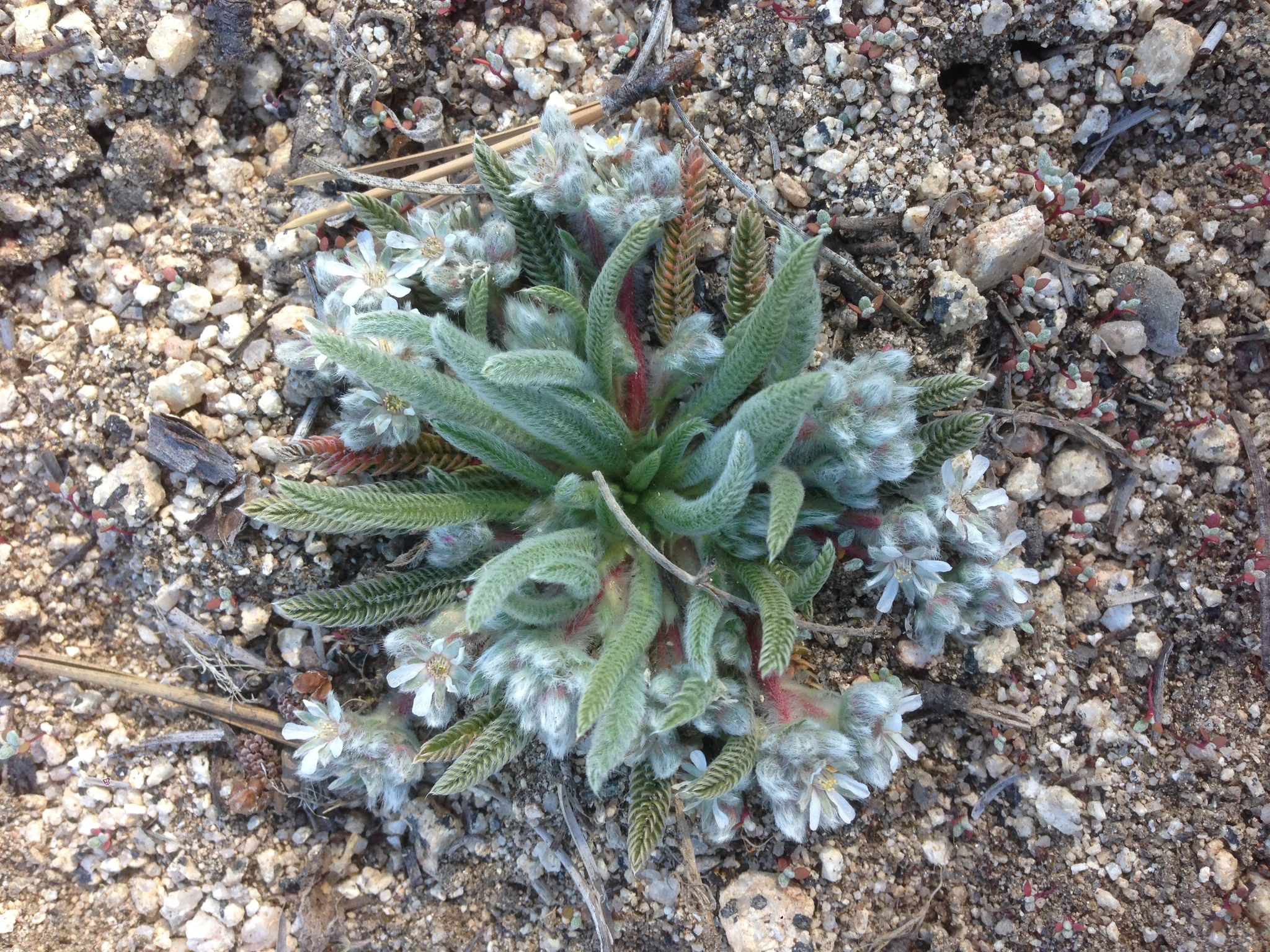

Conservation status
- Imperiled (NatureServe)

Scientific classification
- Kingdom: Plantae
- Clade: Tracheophytes
- Clade: Angiosperms
- Clade: Eudicots
- Clade: Rosids
- Order: Rosales
- Family: Rosaceae
- Genus: Potentilla
- Species: P. argyrocoma

Binomial name
- Potentilla argyrocoma (Rydb.) Jeps.

Synonyms
- Horkelia argyrocoma Rydb.; Ivesia argyrocoma (Rydb.) Rydb.

= Potentilla argyrocoma =

Species of flowering plant

Potentilla argyrocoma, commonly known as silverhair mousetail, is a species of flowering plant in the rose family. It is native to the San Bernardino Mountains of southwestern San Bernardino County, California. A population of Potentilla argyrocoma is also found in Baja California in Mexico; this population may or may not be distinct and further study is required.

== Description ==
Potentilla argyrocoma is a small perennial herb producing a clump of fuzzy reddish naked stems that grow horizontal to the ground and a number of tail-like hairy leaves which grow upright and may curl or droop. The stems are 10 centimetres (3.9 in) to 20 centimetres (7.9 in) long. Each leaf is a nearly cylindrical strip of tightly overlapping leaflets arranged around a central rachis up to 8 centimetres (3.1 in) long. The leaflets are green and covered in a dense coat of shiny silver hairs. Most of the leaves emerge from the base of the stem; a few very small ones may emerge higher up the stem. At the tip of the stem is an inflorescence of one or more clusters of glandular flowers. Each flower has generally five green and red, densely silver-haired, triangular sepals and five smaller oval or spoon-shaped white petals. The center of the P. argyrocoma flowers contain twenty yellow-anthered white stamens and several pistils. The fruit is a tiny smooth brown achene.
