= Islas San Benito =

Island group of Baja California, Mexico

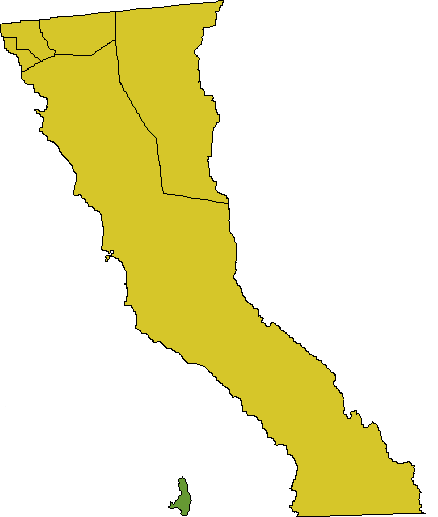
Location of Cedros Island and Islas San Benito in Baja California

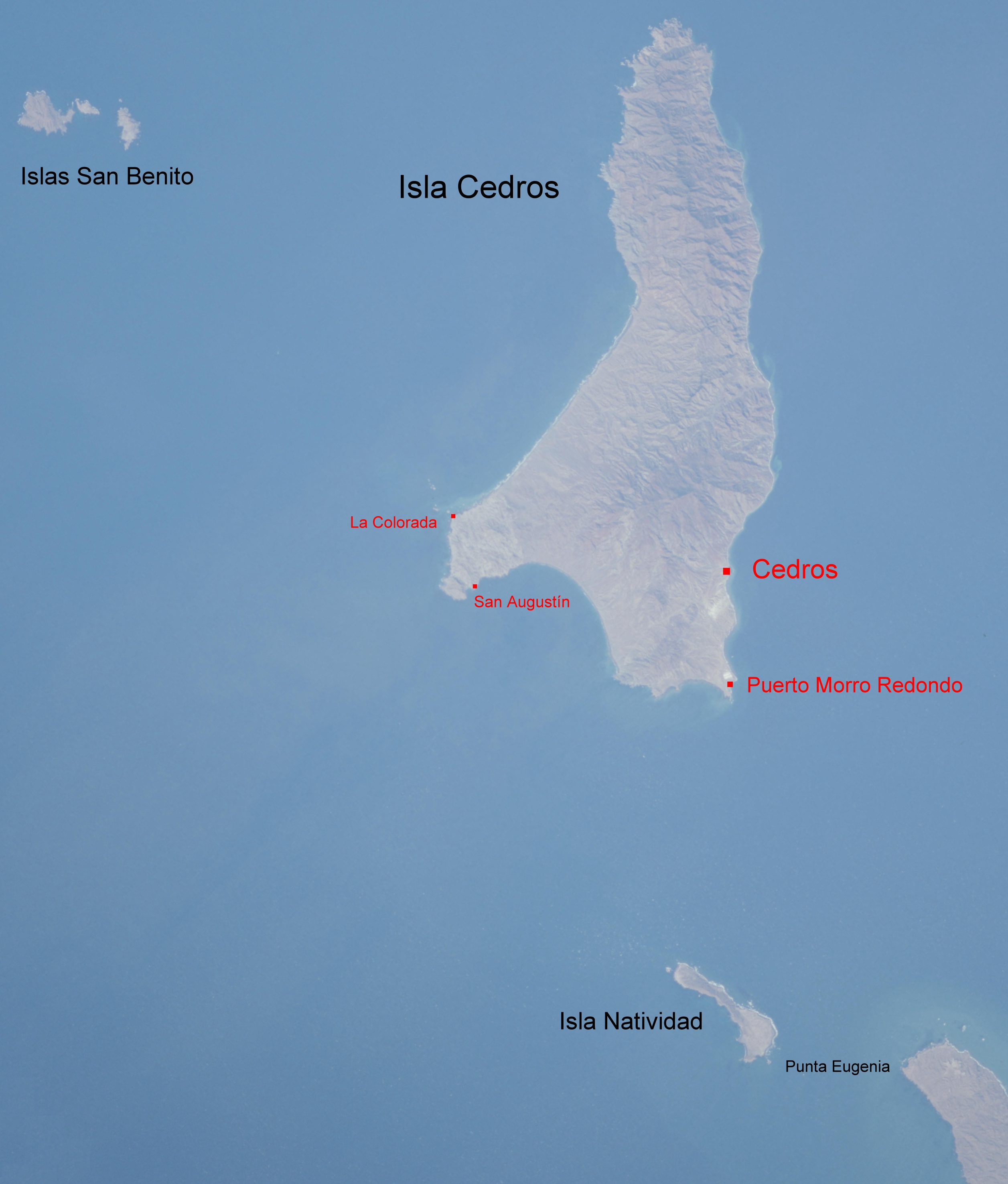
annotated Space Shuttle photo of Cedros Island, with Islas San Benito in the upper left

The Islas San Benito lie in the Pacific Ocean off the west coast of the Mexican state of Baja California, 25 km west of Cedros Island. They are part of the Cedros Island delegación, a subdivision of Ensenada (municipality), Baja California.

The group consists of three barren islands, with a total area of 3.899 km^{2}, and is surrounded by rocks and patches of kelp. The census of 2001 recorded a population of two on Benito del Oeste (West Benito); the other islands are uninhabited.

== Geography and ecology ==
Benito del Oeste (West Benito, 2.6 km^{2}) is the westernmost and largest island of the group. It appears as a plateau with a mound rising 600 ft (202 m) high near the center. A lighthouse tower, 4 m high, stands in the southern part of the island. The main lighthouse, a prominent, 17 m high tower with a dwelling, stands near the northwest extremity of the island. Rocas Pinaculo, two steep-to rocks, lie 1.6 km west of Benito del Oeste.

Benito del Centro (Central Benito, 0.4 km^{2}) 28°18′30″N 115°33′54″W and Benito del Este (East Benito, 0.9 km^{2}) 28°18′03″N 115°32′25″W, the other two islands, lie close east of Benito del Oeste and are separated by Canal de Peck, a deep passage just 200 ft (c. 65 m) wide. Benito del Este is characterized by four well-defined hills up to 421 ft (c.140 m) high. Benito del Centro is low and flat with a hill 82 ft (25 m) high rising near its eastern end.

The vegetation consists mainly of low shrubs and herbs as well as some large cacti (Cylindropuntia prolifera, C. ramosissima). There are few land animals and no native mammals. Birds are moderately abundant due to the islands' barrenness, but Cassin's auklet is rather plentiful at breeding time.

=== Endemism ===
Due to the islands' remoteness, several endemic taxa have evolved here:

Animals:

- San Benito side-blotched lizard, Uta stansburiana stellata
- San Benito house finch, Carpodacus mexicanus mcgregori – extinct

Disappeared c. the 1940s, mainly due to overhunting by biological specimen collectors.

- San Benito sparrow, Passerculus rostratus sanctorum (or Passerculus sandwichensis sanctorum)

Plants:

- Cryptantha patula – only on West Benito
- Dudleya linearis – only on West Benito
- Hemizonia streetsii – West and East Benito
- Malva pacifica – all islands
- Mammillaria neopalmeri – West and East Benito
- Senecio benedictus – only on West Benito
