= Reid Venable Moran =

American botanist (1916–2010)

- San Diego Natural History Museum Curator of Botany Reid V. Moran. (Photo: San Diego Natural History Museum Research Library)
- Born: June 30, 1916; Los Angeles, California, United States
- Died: January 21, 2010 (aged 93); Clearlake, California, United States
- Scientific career
- Education: Stanford University (B.A.); Cornell University (M.S.); University of California, Berkeley (PhD)
- Fields: Botany
- Workplaces: San Diego Natural History Museum
- Author abbrev. (botany): Moran
- Military career
- Allegiance: United States
- Branch: United States Army: United States Army Air Forces
- Service years: 1942–1946
- Rank: Second lieutenant
- Unit: 515th Bombardment Squadron
- Conflicts: World War II; Big Week; World War II in Yugoslavia
- Awards: Distinguished Flying Cross

Reid Venable Moran (June 30, 1916 – January 21, 2010) was an American botanist and the curator of botany at the San Diego Natural History Museum from 1957 to 1982. Moran was recognized as one of the most knowledgeable field botanists of western North America in his time, and was known for his unparalleled expertise on the flora of the Baja California peninsula. He was also well-known among colleagues for his sense of humor that he imparted into his publications.

Moran was the world authority on the Crassulaceae, a family of succulent plants, and in particular the genus Dudleya, the subject of his Ph.D. dissertation. He named at least 18 plants new to science — some in that family and some not — and published many papers elucidating relationships within the Crassulaceae. As a mark of the respect he earned among his peers, more than a dozen plants have been named for him. Jane Goodall described Moran as "a sort of living myth in botanical exploration in Baja California and the Pacific Islands of Mexico," citing specifically his analysis of the environmental impact of introduced species (especially goats) on the flora of Guadalupe Island.

== Biography ==
=== Early life ===
Born in Los Angeles, California on June 30, 1916, to Edna Louise Venable and Robert Breck Moran (a petroleum geologist), Moran was raised in Pasadena. At the age of 10, Moran was already interested in botany, and had a collection of Dudleya in his backyard. By 1932, 16-year old Moran was noted as a "discriminating young collector" of Dudleya. A now invalid species of Dudleya known as Dudleya moranii was named after him. He received his B.A. from Stanford University in 1939 and his M.S. in botany from Cornell University in 1942 before his studies were interrupted by World War II.

=== Military career ===
Moran served in World War II as a second lieutenant in the United States Army Air Forces from 1942 to 1946, his enlistment interrupting his studies at Cornell. By 1944, Moran served as a navigator on a B-24 Liberator in the 515th Bombardment Squadron during the Big Week raids. On the 23rd of February, Moran's aircraft was shot down over Steyr, Austria on its first mission, but the crew had managed to complete their bombing run and bailed out over German-controlled Yugoslavia. Moran ended up tangled in a tree, which he tried to identify, before he was rescued by Yugoslav partisans and managed to return to friendly territory in Italy after 6 weeks with the rest of his crew, collecting plants on the way.

On his way back to the United States, Moran passed through Algeria and Morocco, visiting the French botanist René Maire, at the time the authority on Algerian and Moroccan plants. Moran collected plants and Maire assisted with identification and gave Moran tours of the local botanic gardens. Moran later stopped in Dakar and Brazil before making his way back to the United States, returning with 350 herbarium specimens. By September 1944 Moran was assigned as an Assistant Research Officer in the AAF Instructor's School at Selma, Alabama. Moran was discharged in 1946.

=== Later life ===
After service in World War II, Moran worked at the Santa Barbara Botanic Garden for a year and a half, but left when he was expected to become its next director, as he found the position too restrictive. Moran went on to receive his Ph.D. in botany from the University of California, Berkeley, in 1951. His doctoral dissertation was titled "A Revision of Dudleya (Crassulaceae)."

He then went on to join the Bailey Hortorium at Cornell, and then left to join the University of California's Far East Program teaching biology to military personnel in Korea, Japan, the Philippines and Okinawa. While there, Moran spent time collecting specimens of Crassulaceae and sending them to Charles H. Uhl at Cornell for cytology. After his time in Asia, Moran was hired by his longtime collaborator George Edmund Lindsay, who by then was the director of the San Diego Natural History Museum, as the curator of botany. Moran worked as curator from 1957 to 1982.

As curator of botany, Moran traveled the Baja California Peninsula and its surrounding islands extensively, visiting Guadalupe Island numerous times and exploring the peninsula via car, mule, or by foot. During his time at the museum, the number of specimens in the herbarium increased from 44,000 to 108,000, the majority being Moran's.

In 1996, Moran published the Flora of Guadalupe Island, a culmination of his nearly 50 years studying the island. The book was pivotal in raising awareness to the plight of feral goats on the island and contributed to their removal.

Moran died of pneumonia on January 21, 2010, in Clearlake, California.

== Career ==
Moran conducted a botanical survey of the Channel Islands for the Los Angeles County Museum of Natural History and performed taxonomic work for the Santa Barbara Botanical Garden and the Bailey Hortorium at Cornell University before joining the San Diego Museum of Natural History as curator of botany, succeeding Ethel Bailey Higgins in 1957.

Moran specialized in the systematics of the Crassulaceae (the stonecrop family), and in the floristics of the Baja California peninsula. In addition to a large number of technical research papers, Moran published The Flora of Guadalupe Island and the treatment of the Crassulaceae for the Flora of North America (Vol. 8, published in 2009). He co-authored (with Frank W. Gould) The Grasses of Baja California, Mexico in 1981 and (with Geoffrey A. Levin) The Vascular Flora of Isla Socorro, Mexico in 1989.

=== Scientific humor ===
Moran's serious scientific publications were often characterized by his "well-known, unique sense of humor" that he imparted into a number of papers. He was also known for his practical jokes among colleagues, distinguishing himself at Berkeley by sending an egg through the post office to herbarium botanist Phyllis Gardner. Moran would continue this trend by attempting to send a pumpkin and even a dried manta ray, unwrapped, through the mail. A 2010 obituary for Moran published in The San Diego Union-Tribune noted that he "had a dry sense of humor".

==== A Revision of Dudleya (Crassulaceae) ====
Moran's celebrated dissertation on the genus Dudleya produced at Berkeley contains a humorous acknowledgement similar to the joke he would later make in his paper on Cneoridium dumosum:

I am deeply indebted to Mr. Karl Jakob, without whose kind cooperation this thesis would have been submitted one hour and 35 minutes later.

==== Cneoridium dumosum (Nuttall) Hooker F. Collected March 26, 1960, at an Elevation of about 1450 Meters on Cerro Quemazón, 15 Miles South of Bahía de Los Angeles, Baja California, México, Apparently for a Southeastward Range Extension of Some 140 Miles ====
Cneoridium dumosum
Audio of the "Cneoridium dumosum" section, dated 28 June 2023

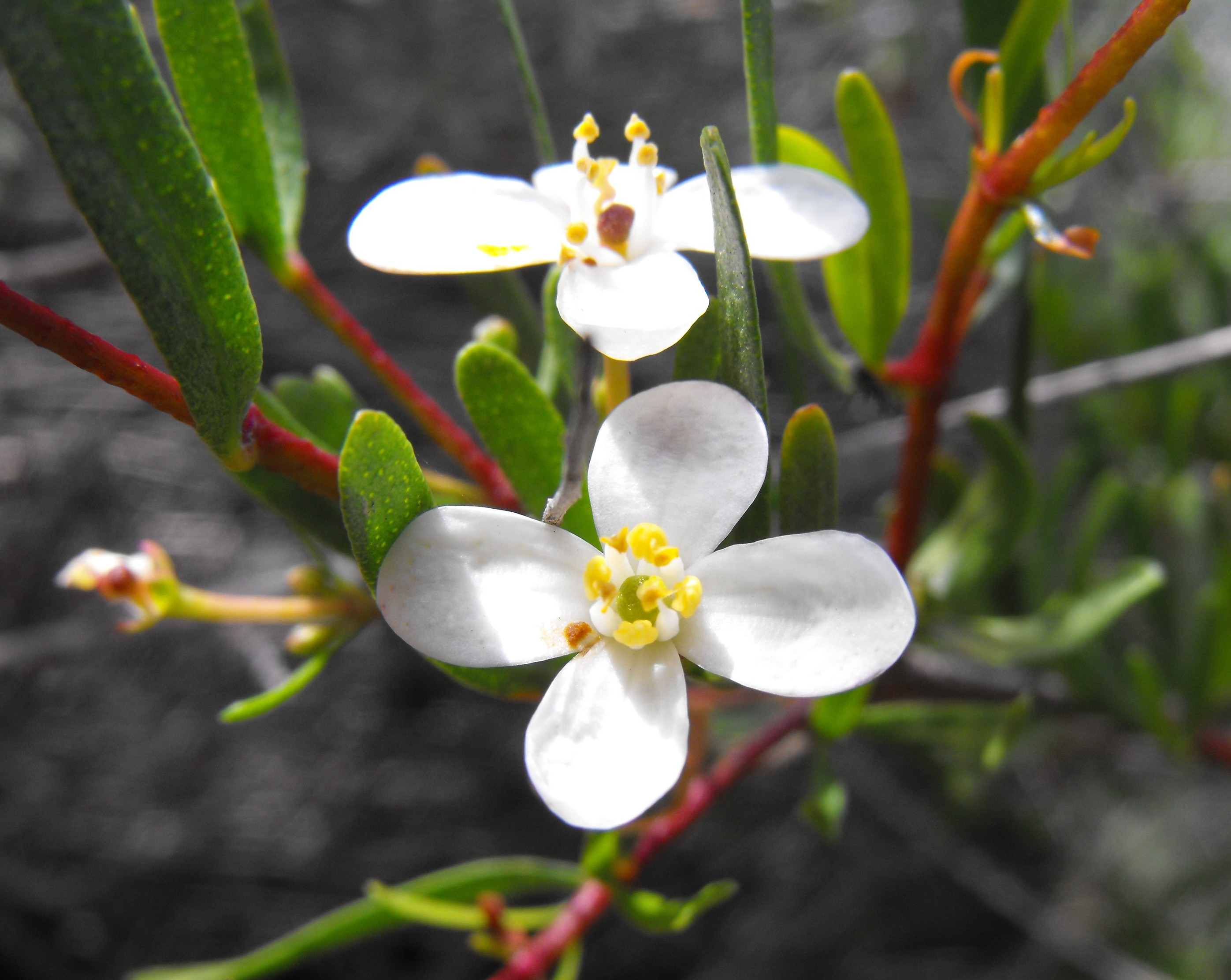
A specimen of Cneoridium dumosum

Among Moran's publications was "Cneoridium dumosum (Nuttall) Hooker F. Collected March 26, 1960, at an Elevation of about 1450 Meters on Cerro Quemazón, 15 Miles South of Bahía de Los Angeles, Baja California, México, Apparently for a Southeastward Range Extension of Some 140 Miles", a humorous yet factual scientific paper on species distribution. Apart from its pangrammatic title and 29 lines of acknowledgements, the entire text of the paper contains just five words and a reference number.

The paper reports a collection of Cneoridium dumosum in the Sierra de San Borja mountains of southern Baja California, representing a new disjunct distribution for the species. As Moran described in a 1983 book on insular biogeography, this disjunct population is part of a relict community of otherwise more northerly distributed chaparral plants that have continued to survive in the higher elevation mountains ("sky islands") of southern Baja California.

Moran and his colleague Glen Ives visited the Sierra de San Borja in March 1960 to conduct a natural history survey, with Moran responsible for collecting plant specimens and Ives for birds and mammals. After driving to Bahía de los Ángeles from San Diego, they packed into the mountains for 10 days. They reached the Cerro Quemazón on March 26, where Moran collected his specimen from a Cneoridium plant on the summit.

The full text of the paper, published in 1962 in volume 16 of Madroño, reads: "I got it there then (8068)" where 8068 is the parenthetical reference number of the specimen collected.

Moran's closing acknowledgement reads:

Last but not least, I cannot fail to mention my deep indebtedness to my parents, without whose early cooperation this work would never have been possible.

The paper was republished as a "Reprinted Classic Madroño Article" in 2013, the California Botanical Society's centennial year. The article was also reproduced in a 1993 issue of the Australian Systematic Botany Society's newsletter.

==== Tacitus bellus, un nuevo género y especie de Crassulaceae de Chihuahua, México ====
In 1974, Moran described a new species and genus, Tacitus bellus, with collaborator Jorge Meyrán. As reported in a 1977 profile of Moran in Madroño by Dr. John H. Thomas, he described naming the genus not after the Roman historian or emperor, but rather from the Latin word tacitus, meaning silent, because of the peculiar form of the corolla, with his reason being:

The corolla is scarcely more silent than in most other plants; but compared with that of near relatives, it is very close-mouthed.

Thomas reported that Moran's description that followed was written in "impeccable Latin prose."

== Legacy ==
A number of taxa have been named in honor of Moran. These include:

Genera

- Reidmorania Kimnach

Species

- Agave moranii Gentry
- Arctostaphylos moranii P.V.Wells
- Astragalus moranii Barneby
- Bajacalia moranii B.L.Turner
- Dudleya moranii D.A.Johans
- Dudleya reidmoranii Mulroy, Guilliams, & Hasenstab
- Echeveria moranii E.Walther
- Eriogonum moranii Reveal
- Erysimum moranii Rollins
- Galium moranii Dempster, (syn. Trichogalium moranii (Dempster) Kadereit & Schneew.)
- Jatropha moranii Dehgan & G.L.Webster
- Lupinus moranii Dunkle
- Penstemon reidmoranii Zacarías & A.Wolfe
- Salvia moranii B.L.Turner
- Sanicula moranii P.Vargas, Constance & B.G.Baldwin
- Sedum moranii R.T.Clausen
- Senecio moranii T.M.Barkley, (syn. Packera moranii (T.M.Barkley) C.Jeffrey)
- Trragia moranii Urtecho
- Verbena moranii G.L.Nesom

Infraspecies

- Buddleja corrugata subsp. moranii E.M.Norman
- Ivesia argyrocoma var. moranii Ertter & Reveal, (syn. Potentilla argyrocoma var. moranii (Ertter & Reveal) Mosyakin & Shiyan)

A white oak found in San Diego County and Orange County was informally described as Moran's oak and was to be described as Quercus moranii by botanists Kevin Nixon and Kelly Steele. It was later discovered that these oaks were in fact the same as Nuttall's type specimen for Quercus dumosa, which had previously been misapplied to include a large number of other white scrub oaks.

== See also ==
- Joseph Nelson Rose
- Nathaniel Lord Britton
