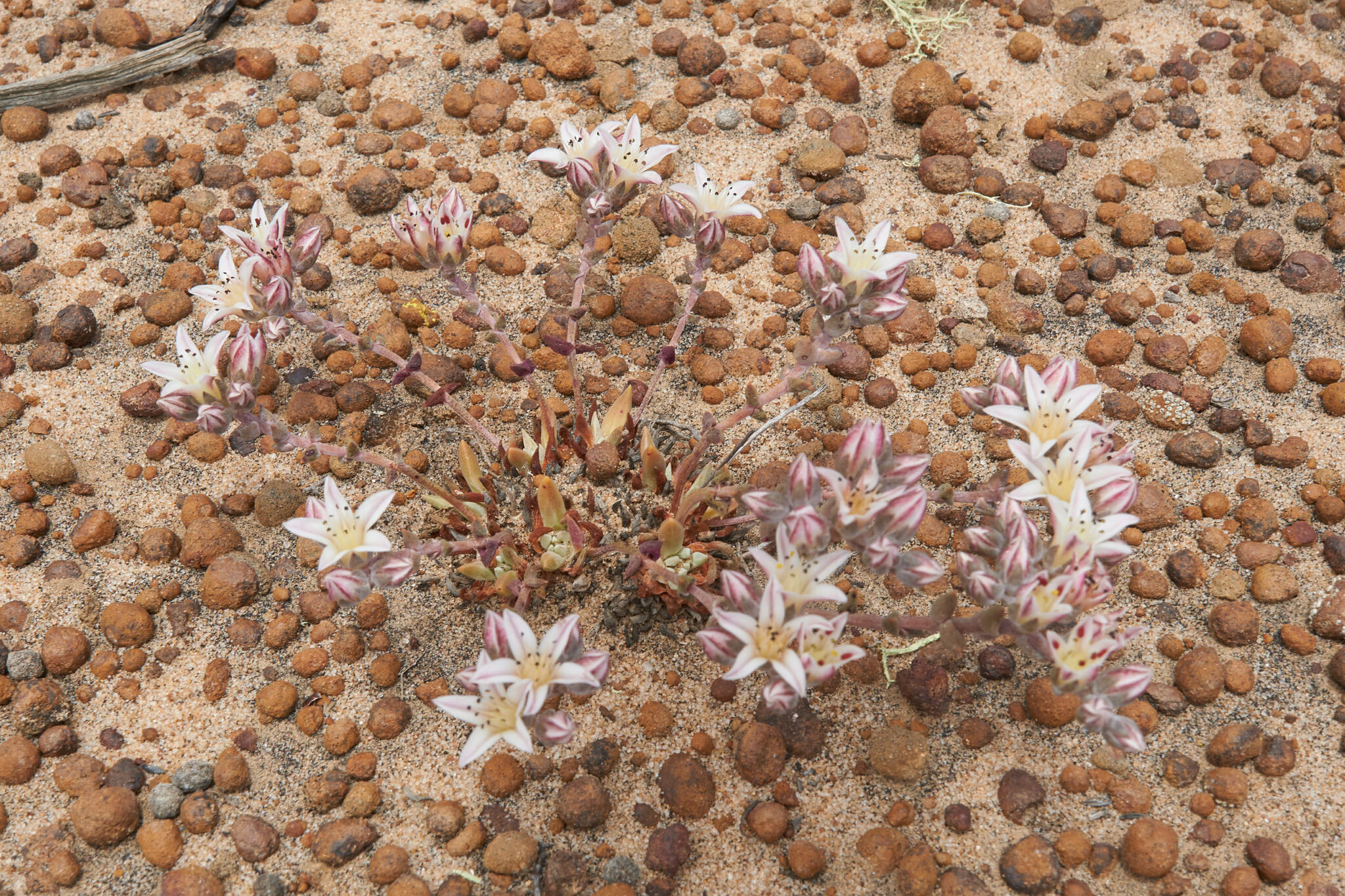

Scientific classification
- Kingdom: Plantae
- Clade: Tracheophytes
- Clade: Angiosperms
- Clade: Eudicots
- Order: Saxifragales
- Family: Crassulaceae
- Genus: Dudleya
- Species: D. crassifolia

Binomial name
- Dudleya crassifolia Dodero & M. G. Simpson

= Dudleya crassifolia =

Species of succulent plant from Mexico

Dudleya crassifolia is a species of drought deciduous, corm-forming succulent plant known by common name as the thick-leaf dudleya. It is an incredibly rare and cryptic plant native to one small locale less than a hectare in area on the Colonet peninsula in Baja California. It is threatened by urban development, including a proposed seaport. It is characterized by white, spreading flowers with leaf bases that are persistent on the stem. Although it did not receive as much media attention as the neighboring Dudleya hendrixii, it has been noted that the plant has several similarities to cryptic succulents like Anacampseros.

== Description ==
This Dudleya is one of numerous species in the genus that form a corm out of their caudex, an underground storage organ that helps them survive. This means that plants can persist even when their above-ground features have gone.

=== Vegetative morphology ===
The plants may have anywhere from one to 10 rosettes, branching at the base. The caudex is shaped cylindrically or irregularly, and is 1 to 5.5 cm long, 2 to 20 mm thick, with a persistent, conspicuous dried leaf base from previous seasons. This is in contrast to the leaves of other deciduous Dudleya that disappear and typically do not persist after. There are 3 to 21 leaves in a rosette. The leaf shape of mature plants is oblanceolate. The tip of the leaf is acuminate to acute. The leaves are 6 to 35 mm long, 3 to 11 mm wide, 1.5 to 7.5 mm thick, with the petioles 0.9 to 12.4 mm long, and 1 to 8 mm wide. The leaf blade is only slightly wider than the petiole. The leaves are drought deciduous, but the dried leaf base is persistent.

Juvenile plants may have globose leaves with rounded tips, and narrower petioles.

=== Reproductive morphology ===
The inflorescence is 6 to 17 cm tall, with the peduncle 1.5 to 3.5 mm thick at the base. The bracts start within 1 to 2 cm of the base, with 7 to 19 lower bracts, shaped ovate to widely ovate, with an acute tip. The lowermost bracts are 9 to 20 mm long, 6 to 11 mm wide, and 3 to 7 mm thick. There are 2 to 3 ascending branches on the inflorescence that may rebranch once. The terminal branches are 1 to 4 cm long, and have 2 to 10 flowers. The pedicels are ascending, 1 to 3.5 mm long. The flowers have a characteristic "musky" odor. The sepals are shaped narrowly triangular to ovate, with acute to acuminate tips. The petals are white, fused at the base 1 to 2 mm (connation), with the keel and the base of the corolla colored maroon.

Plants flower from late May to June. Chromosome number is n = 34. Seed dispersal is via wind or rain, with the seeds moving along with grains of sand on a windy day. In optimal conditions, germination may occur in less than 72 hours.

== Distribution and habitat ==
This species is endemic to Baja California in Mexico. This plant grows 7 miles south of the town of Colonet, on the reddish sandstone bluffs of a mesa. It grows in maritime chaparral, on a soil with iron concretions, similar to Dudleya brevifolia's habitat, which is also on a sandstone bluff with iron concretions. The entire locality where Dudleya crassifolia occurs is less than one hectare. It shares the general locality with numerous species of Dudleya, including other deciduous species like Dudleya hendrixii and Dudleya blochmaniae.

== Ecology ==
This plant is likely pollinated by members of the sand wasp group Bembicinae, and beetle species of Dasytes. Rabbits and small rodents are significant herbivores of the plant, especially consuming it in dry periods. The leaves of the plant are also consumed during the winter growing season. Plants may re-sprout from beneath the soil even if the above-ground parts appear to be dead.
