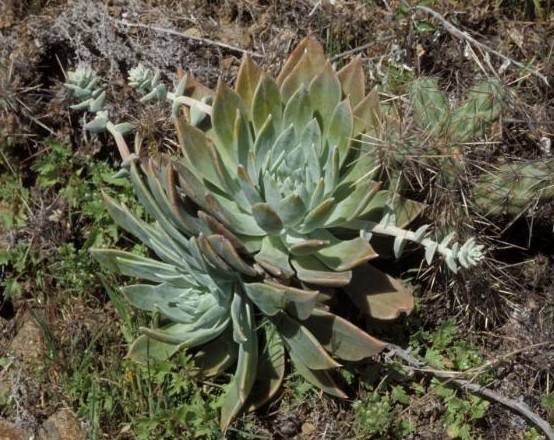

Conservation status
- Critically Imperiled (NatureServe)

Scientific classification
- Kingdom: Plantae
- Clade: Tracheophytes
- Clade: Angiosperms
- Clade: Eudicots
- Order: Saxifragales
- Family: Crassulaceae
- Genus: Dudleya
- Species: D. traskiae

Binomial name
- Dudleya traskiae (Rose) Moran
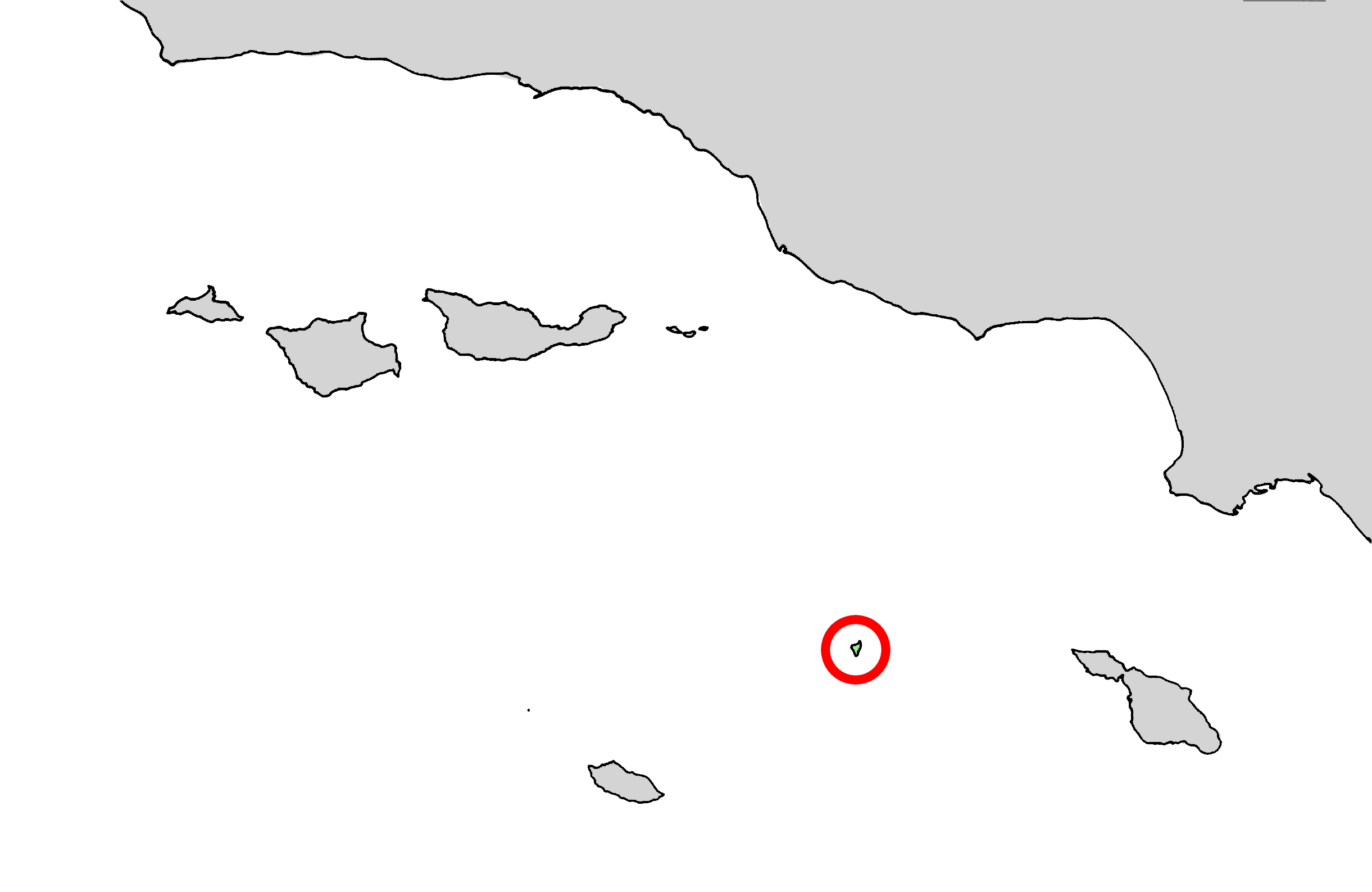
- Natural range of Dudleya traskiae

Synonyms
- Stylophyllum traskae Rose; Cotyledon traskae Fedde; Echeveria traskae Berger

= Dudleya traskiae =

Santa Barbara Island liveforever

Species of succulent

Dudleya traskiae (originally spelled Dudleya traskae) is a rare succulent plant known by the common name Santa Barbara Island liveforever. Dudleya is endemic to Santa Barbara Island, one of the Channel Islands of California, where it grows on rocky bluffs. The plant has a basal rosette of flat, spade-shaped fleshy leaves up to 15 centimeters long, which are pale green to yellowish. It erects tall stems bearing dense, rounded inflorescences of many bright yellow flowers.

== Description ==
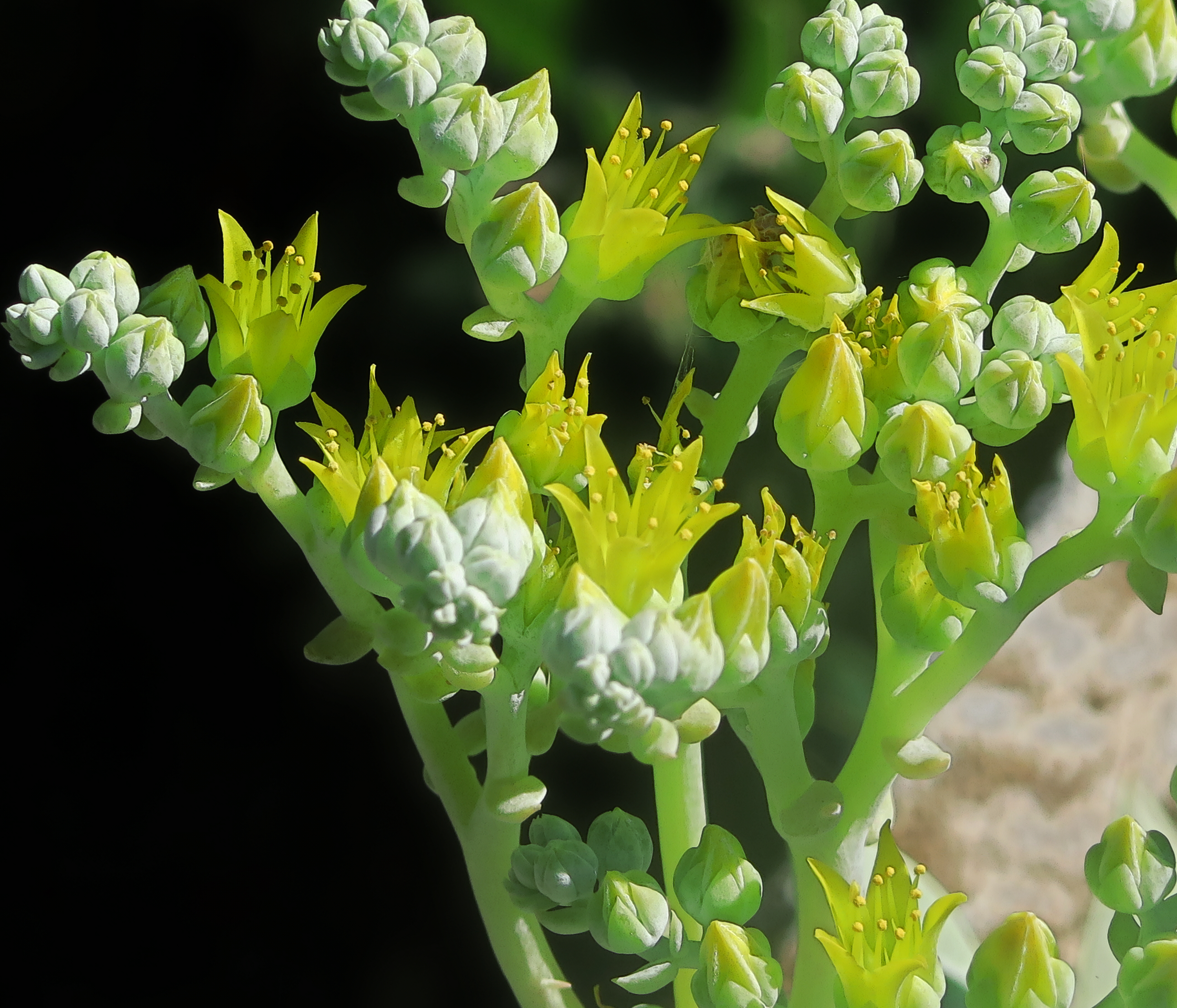
The flowers.

Dudleya traskiae is a perennial succulent herb with foliage leaves in a basal rosette. The plants are evergreen, with a branched primary stem (caudex) and are composed of one to several hundred rosettes. The branching of the stem is dichotomous. The rosette leaves number 25–35, are strap-shaped - oblanceolate to subacuminate and are 4–15 cm long and 1–4 cm wide. Leaves may be green or glaucous with a waxy covering. The flowering stems are axillary and flowering is indeterminate in paniculate or cymose clusters. The petals (5) are bright yellow, often with red veins, fused below and curving outward in the upper half. Stamens (10) are borne on the corolla tube. The fruit is composed of 5 carpels that are spreading in age, 7–8 mm long. Seeds are many and minute, narrow and pointed. Dudleya traskiae is tetraploid with a chromosome number of 34. Flowering most commonly occurs from May–July, although flowering may begin as early as mid-February.

== Taxonomy ==
The first photographs and specimens of this plant were collected by Blanche Trask. Most of Trask's work was destroyed in the 1906 San Francisco Fire, and many of her remaining work was destroyed in a 1915 fire at her herbarium on Santa Catalina. This species was originally placed into the genus Stylophyllum during Nathaniel Lord Britton and Joseph Nelson Rose's revision of North American Crassulaceae.

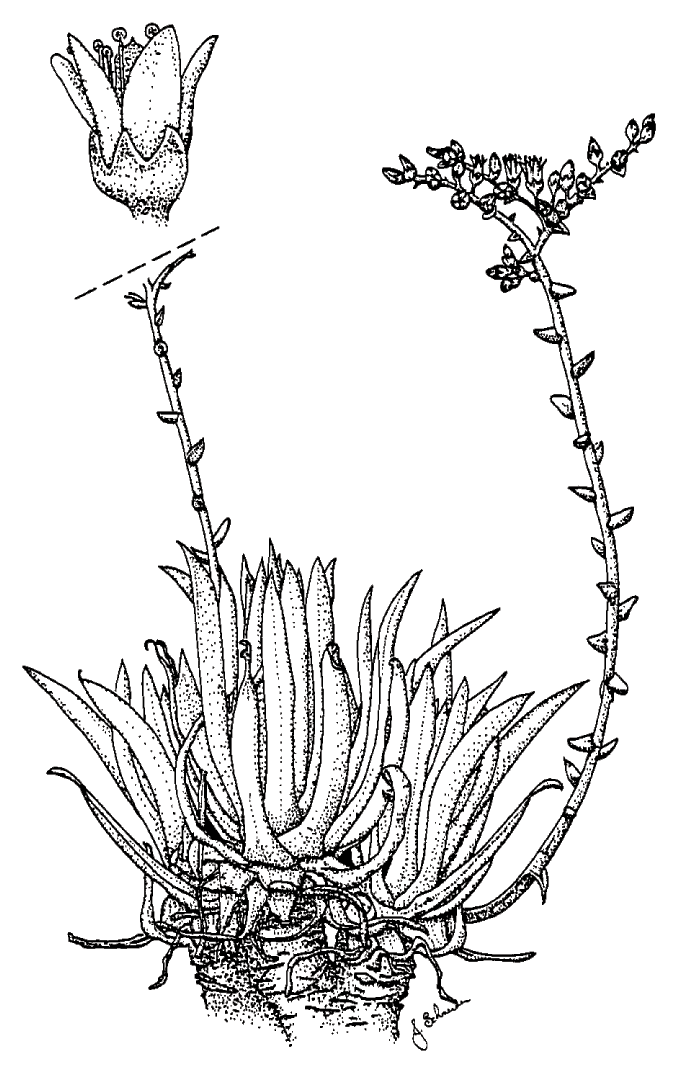
A botanical illustration of Dudleya traskiae.

W.L. Jepson and Philip A. Munz both synonymized it with nearby species. In 1935, Munz placed it with Stylophyllum albidum (Dudleya virens ssp. virens) and S. insulare (Dudleya virens ssp. insularis) in Echeveria albida. In 1936, Jepson regarded it as a synonym of Echeveria viscida var. insularis (Dudleya virens ssp. insularis).

Subsequent taxonomic work by Reid Moran would place Stylophyllum as a subgenus of Dudleya. Moran disagreed with Jepson and Munz's reduction of the species as a synonym, regarding it as "very distinct." Henceforth, Stylophyllum traskae became Dudleya traskae.

=== Nomenclature ===
The plant is named after Blanche Trask, who took the first photographs and collections of the plant. The original spelling traskae is corrected according to the rules of the International Code of Nomenclature for algae, fungi, and plants as of 2011, article 60.

== Distribution and habitat ==
The genus Dudleya is primarily Californian, though it also extends north into southern Oregon, east to central Arizona and southern Nevada, and south to the tip of Baja California, Mexico. Dudleya taxa occur on each of the eight Channel Islands. Dudleya traskiae is known only from Santa Barbara Island, California.

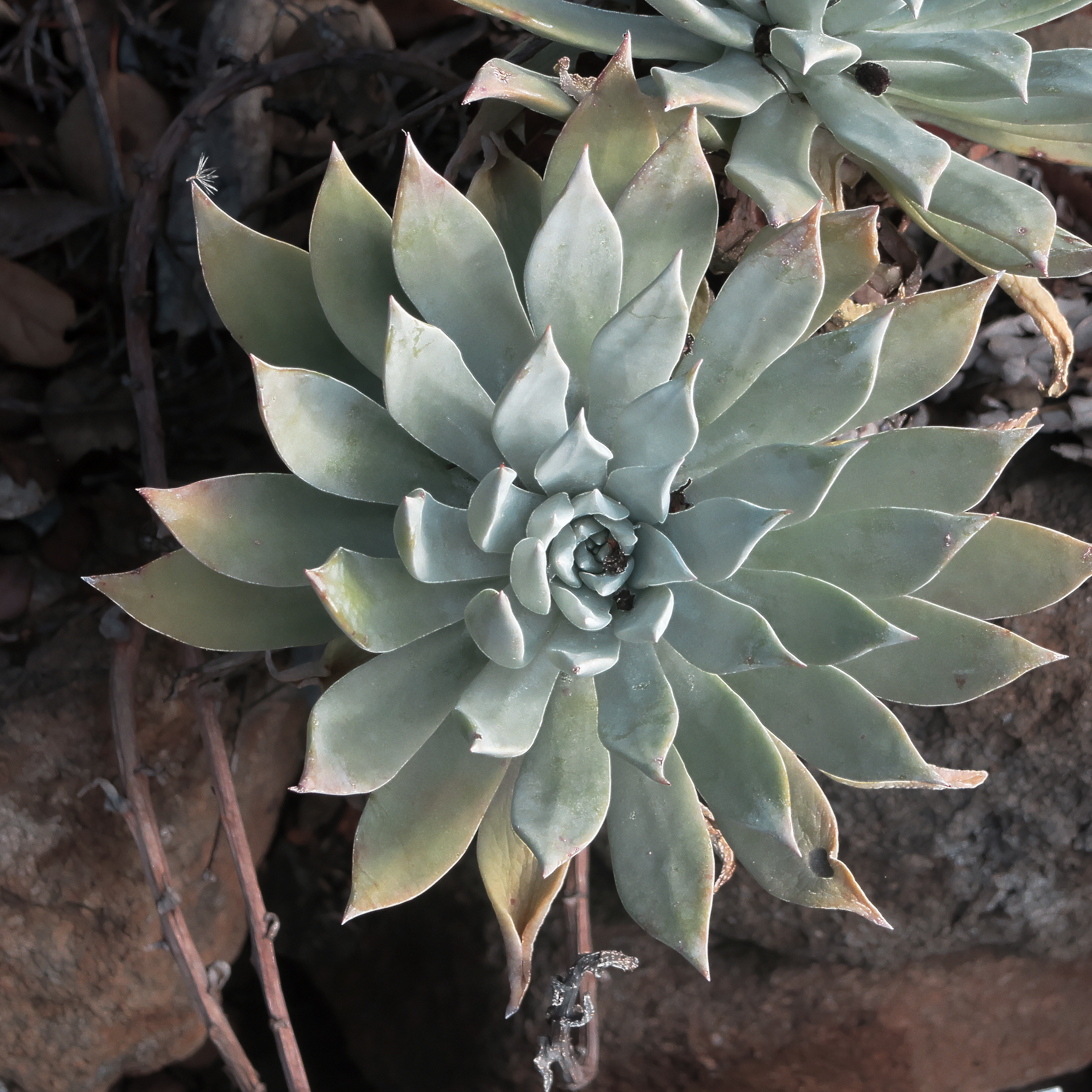
Dudleya traskiae photographed at Regional Parks Botanic Garden located in Tilden Regional Park near Berkeley, CA.

There are ten occurrences on this 652-acre island.

All of the known sites supporting Dudleya traskiae are in rocky areas on the steep slopes of the island's perimeter or on outcrops within shallow canyons where vegetation is low-growing. With the exception of a small population on the far western portion of the island, all locations, historic as well as present day (as of 1989) occur on the eastern, southeastern and southwestern slopes of the island. No Dudleya traskiae plants presently occur on the northern and north-western sides of the island although they do occur elsewhere on north-facing slopes. The habitat of Dudleya traskiae has been described as a maritime cactus scrub, and by Holland (1986) as southern coastal bluff scrub. This assemblage of plants, characterized by cholla (Cylindropuntia prolifera), prickly pear (O. oricola and O. littoralis), boxthorn (Lycium californicum), Santa Barbara Island buckwheat (Eriogonum giganteum ssp. compactum) and annual forbs and grasses, is restricted to the perimeter of the island and south-facing slopes of the canyons.

== Conservation ==
This plant is federally listed as an endangered species of the United States.

It and other native flora were heavily impacted in the 19th century by the presence of hordes of feral goats. The goats were followed by other introduced species, including cats, sheep, New Zealand red rabbits, and Belgian hares.

By 1984 the total number of D. traskiae on the island was about 534. By 2004 the total number was estimated to be around 852. About 80 plants were cultivated and planted in appropriate habitat.

Dudleya traskiae is slow to increase its population due to several factors. Some plants produce few seeds, and some produce few seeds that are viable. Seeds produced are sometimes taken and consumed by deer mice (Peromyscus maniculatus ssp. exilis). On the other hand, when the mice cache the seeds, they may aid in its difficult seed dispersal. Seedlings that successfully emerge are consumed by the mice and by the larvae of owlet moths. Others perished in drought.

Other threats include damage from the activity of nesting brown pelicans, erosion, and introduced plant species.

Conservation efforts include keeping people away from sensitive habitat, performing research, and planting more individuals in the habitat. All the introduced herbivores, including the particularly destructive rabbits and hares, have been removed from the island.
