= Dudleya rigidiflora =

Scientific classification
- Kingdom: Plantae
- Clade: Tracheophytes
- Clade: Angiosperms
- Clade: Eudicots
- Order: Saxifragales
- Family: Crassulaceae
- Genus: Dudleya
- Species: D. rigidiflora

Binomial name
- Dudleya rigidiflora Britton & Rose 1903

Synonyms
- Cotyledon rigidiflora (Rose) Fedde; Echeveria rigidiflora (Rose) A.Berger

Species of succulent

Dudleya rigidiflora is a very rare species of succulent perennial plant known by the common name Playa Maria liveforever, endemic to the coast of southwestern Baja California.

== Description ==
=== Morphology ===
It is a solitary or few-branched plant, but it may form clumps up to 1 meter in diameter. The caudex is 2 decimetres (20 cm) long, and 1.5 to 4 cm wide. Each individual rosette is 0.5 dm (5.0 cm) to 1.5 dm (15 cm) wide, with 20 to 60 erect to ascending leaves. The leaves are light green and glaucous.

The floral stems are 15 to 40 cm tall, green or reddish, 4 to 9 mm in diameter, with 15 to 30 bracts. The inflorescence is of numerous long, slender, and secund racemes. The pedicels are ascending, 4 to 5 mm long. The calyx is deeply 5-cleft, with equal lobes, fleshy, and 6 to 7 mm long, acuminate, and somewhat glaucous. The corolla is 12 mm long, with a tube 5 mm long, the lobes of the petals slender, acute and erect. The color of the corolla is variable, ranging from white with no yellow to red or reddish. There are 10 stamens, much shorter than the corolla, all attached towards the top of the corolla-tube. 5 carpels, slender and erect, free to the base. Type specimen collected in July to October 1896 by an A. W. Anthony.

Specimens collected by Reid Moran show that the chromosome number is n=34.

== Distribution ==
Occurs on the coast of southwestern Baja California, around the Playa Maria Bay (Bahía María), near San José de las Palomas. It occurs on barren hillsides and arroyos near the Pacific Ocean.
