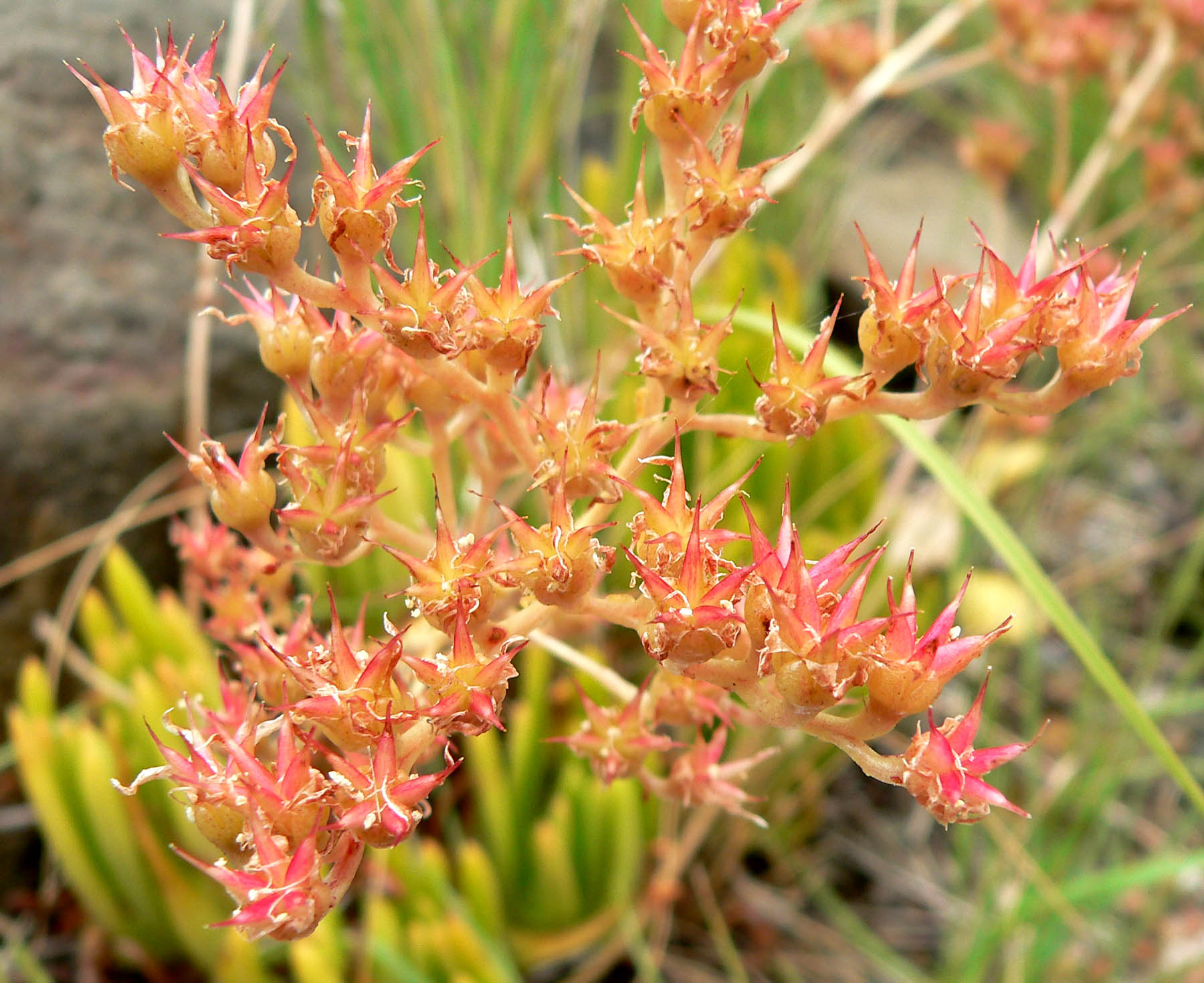

Conservation status
- Imperiled (NatureServe)

Scientific classification
- Kingdom: Plantae
- Clade: Tracheophytes
- Clade: Angiosperms
- Clade: Eudicots
- Order: Saxifragales
- Family: Crassulaceae
- Genus: Dudleya
- Species: D. viscida

Binomial name
- Dudleya viscida (Rose) Moran

Synonyms
- Cotyledon viscida Watson (1882); Stylophyllum viscidum Britton & Rose (1903); Echeveria viscida Berger(1930)

= Dudleya viscida =

Species of succulent

Dudleya viscida is a rare succulent plant known by common name as the sticky liveforever, sticky dudleya or the San Juan stylophyllum. It is endemic to California, where it is found on rocky slopes. It is unique among the genus Dudleya in that it has sticky, fragrant leaves, a trait only shared with Dudleya anomala.

== Description ==
=== Morphology ===
Dudleya viscida has a basal clump of erect fleshy, pointed leaves which are nearly cylindrical or most often elliptical in cross section. They are pale green to yellow-green or red in color and covered in a sticky, oily exudate which has a faintly resinous scent. It grows erect stems with many-branched inflorescences, with each branch bearing up to 10 flowers. Each flower is pink to nearly white with red veining or streaks and protruding stamens between the pointed petals.

Flower is from May to June. Chromosome number is n=17.

Dudleya viscida

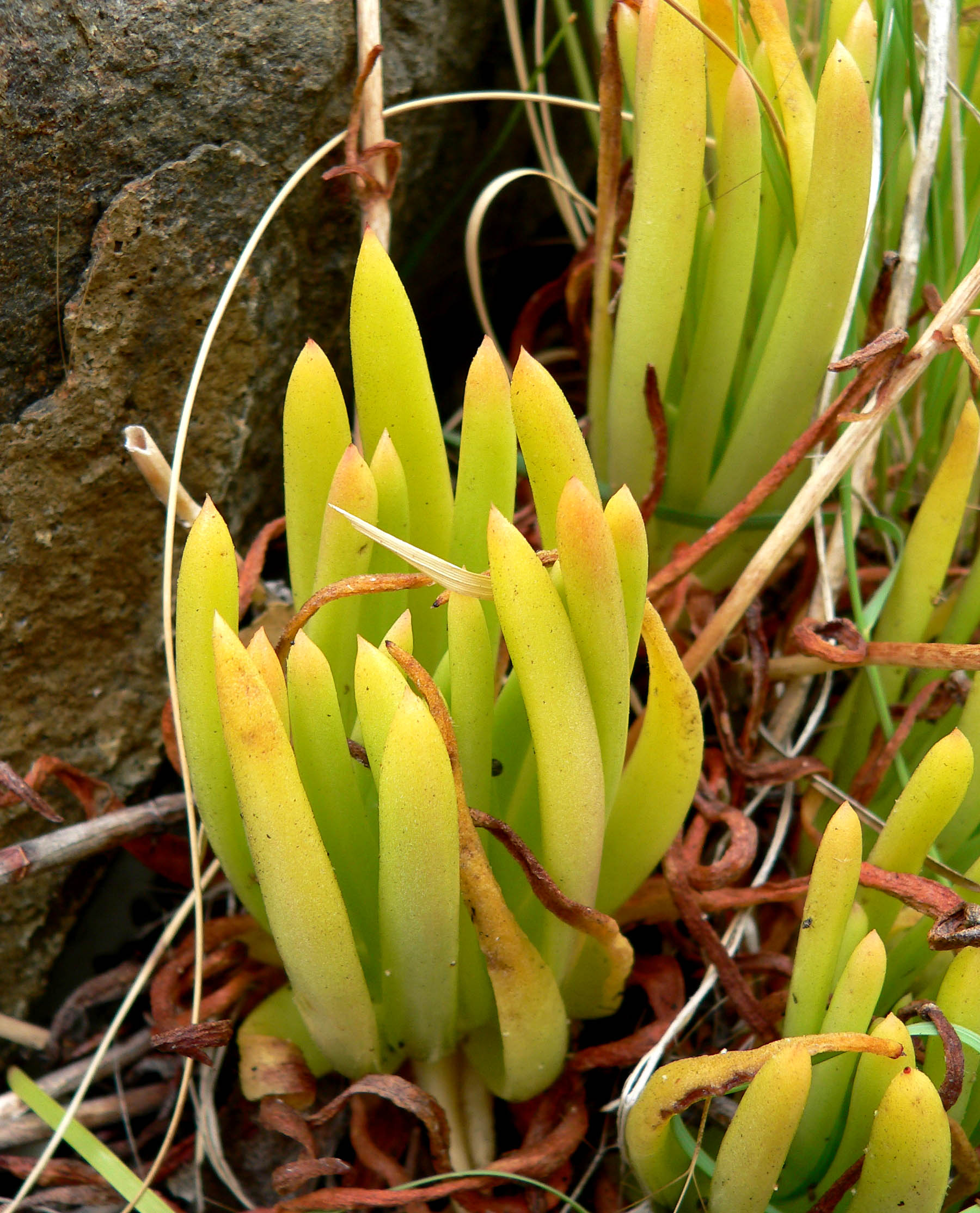
Foliage

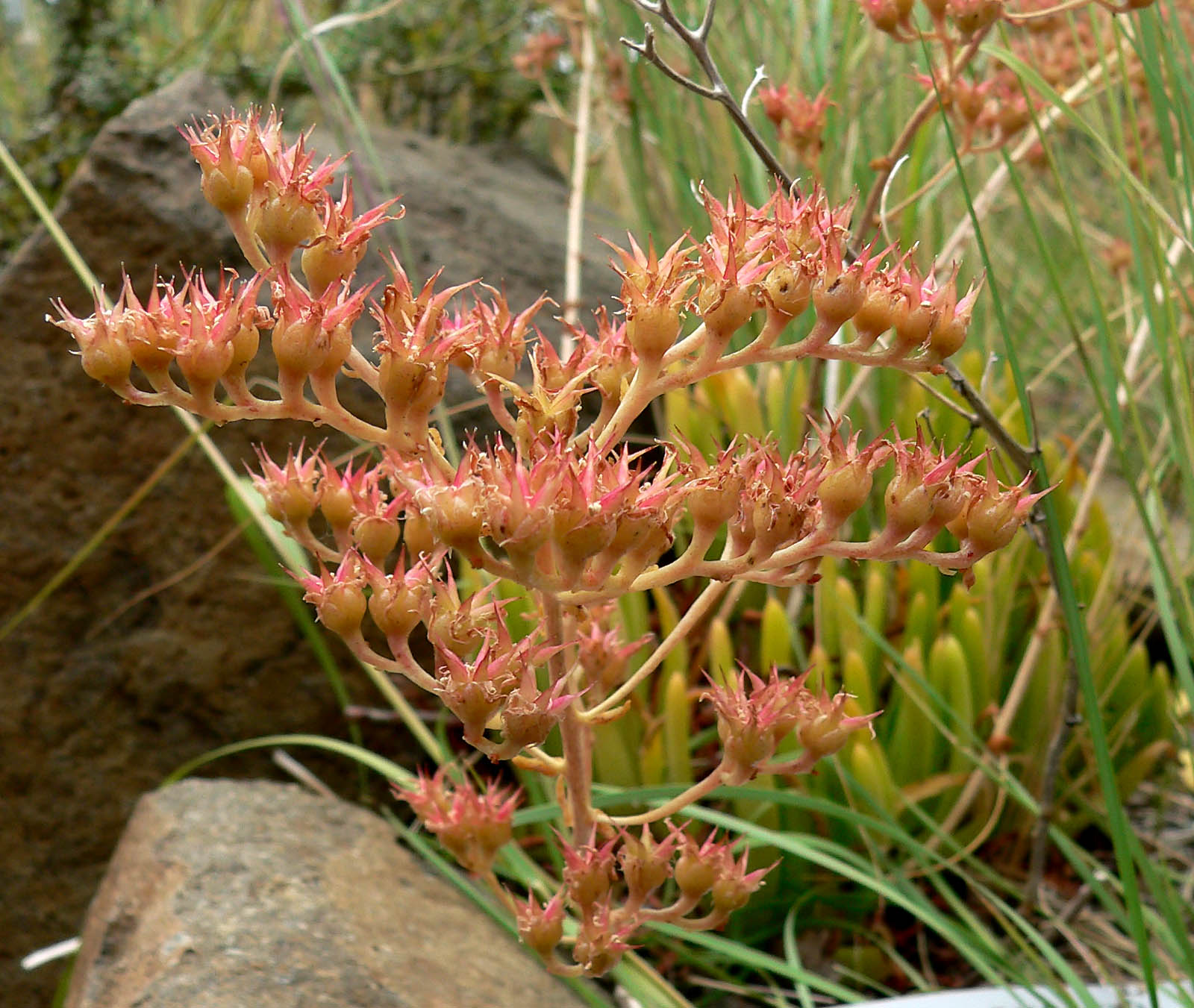
Inflorescence

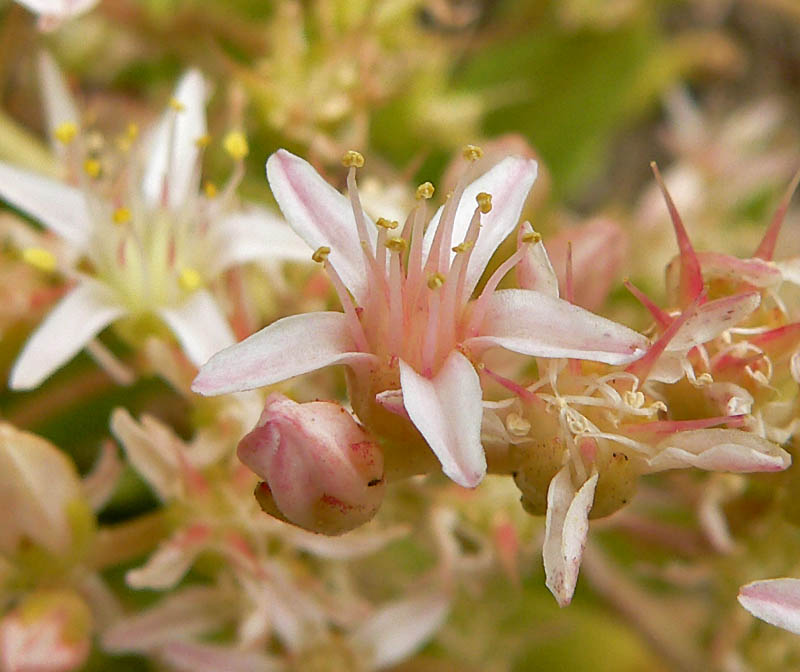
Flowers

== Taxonomy ==
=== Taxonomic history ===
This plant was described from the types collected on rocks near the San Juan Capistrano Hot Springs, by a Rev. J. C. Nevin in October 1881. The collection was deposited at the Gray Herbarium of Harvard University. Joseph Nelson Rose's specimens were labeled as "Ocean Beach, near San Diego," but this is likely an error, probably referring to Oceanside instead. Reid Moran placed the species in Dudleya, as Stylophyllum was recognized as a subgenera.

== Distribution ==
This Dudleya is endemic to southern California, where it is known from only about 20 occurrences in San Diego, Orange, and Riverside Counties. It is mainly found on coastal sage scrub bluffs and inland chaparral rocky slopes, usually below 450 meters. In San Diego County, it is found on the bluffs at the mouth of the Santa Margarita River, Escondido Creek at Olivenhain, and San Marcos Creek.

== Conservation ==
This species was once a candidate for the recognition under the Endangered Species Act, but a federal review in 1996 determined that the population was stable and larger than previously though. The plant's population roughly numbers between 100,000 and 250,000 individuals.
