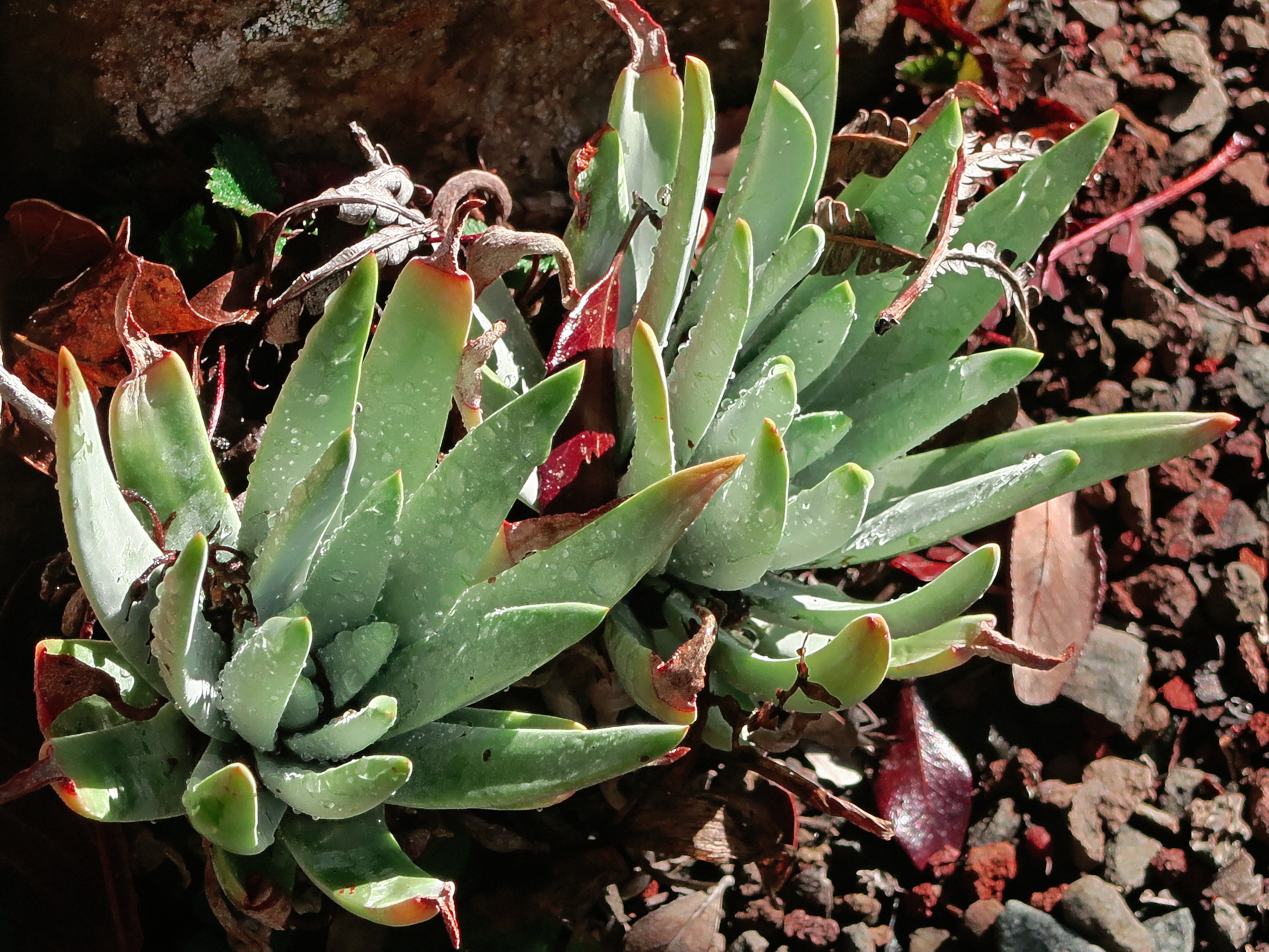
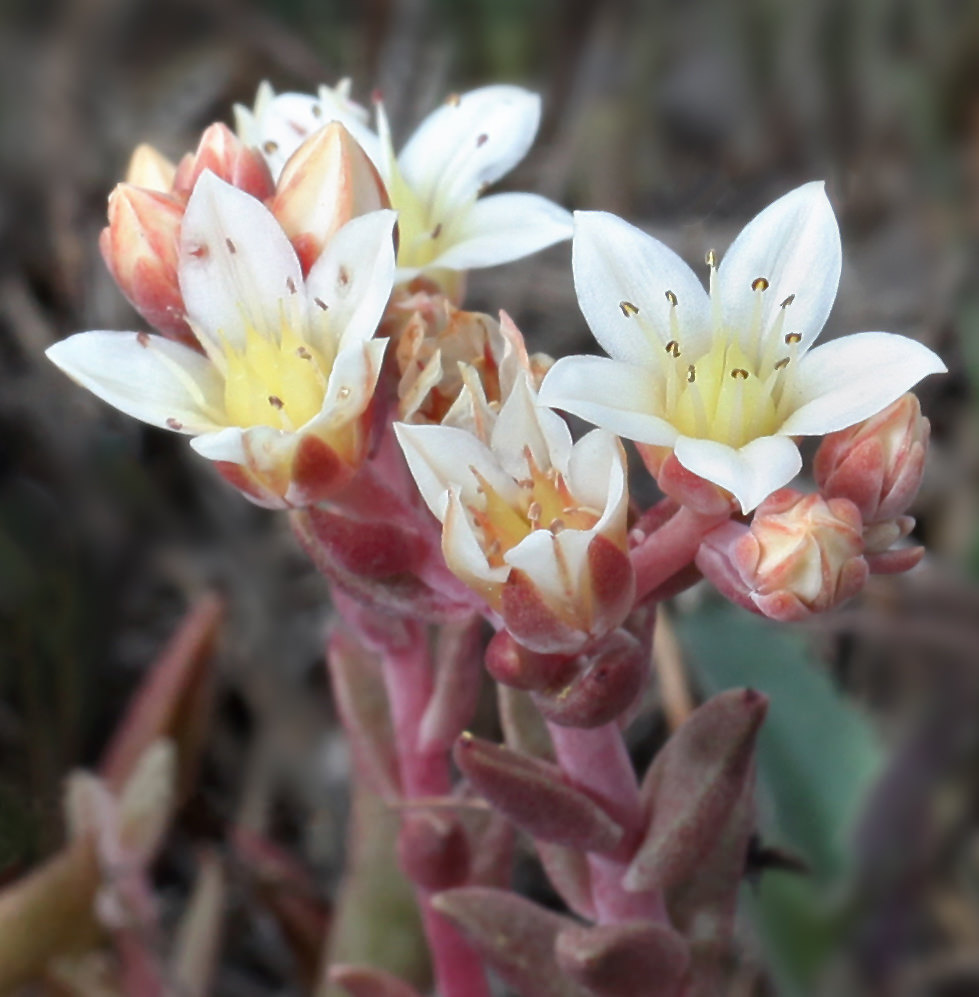
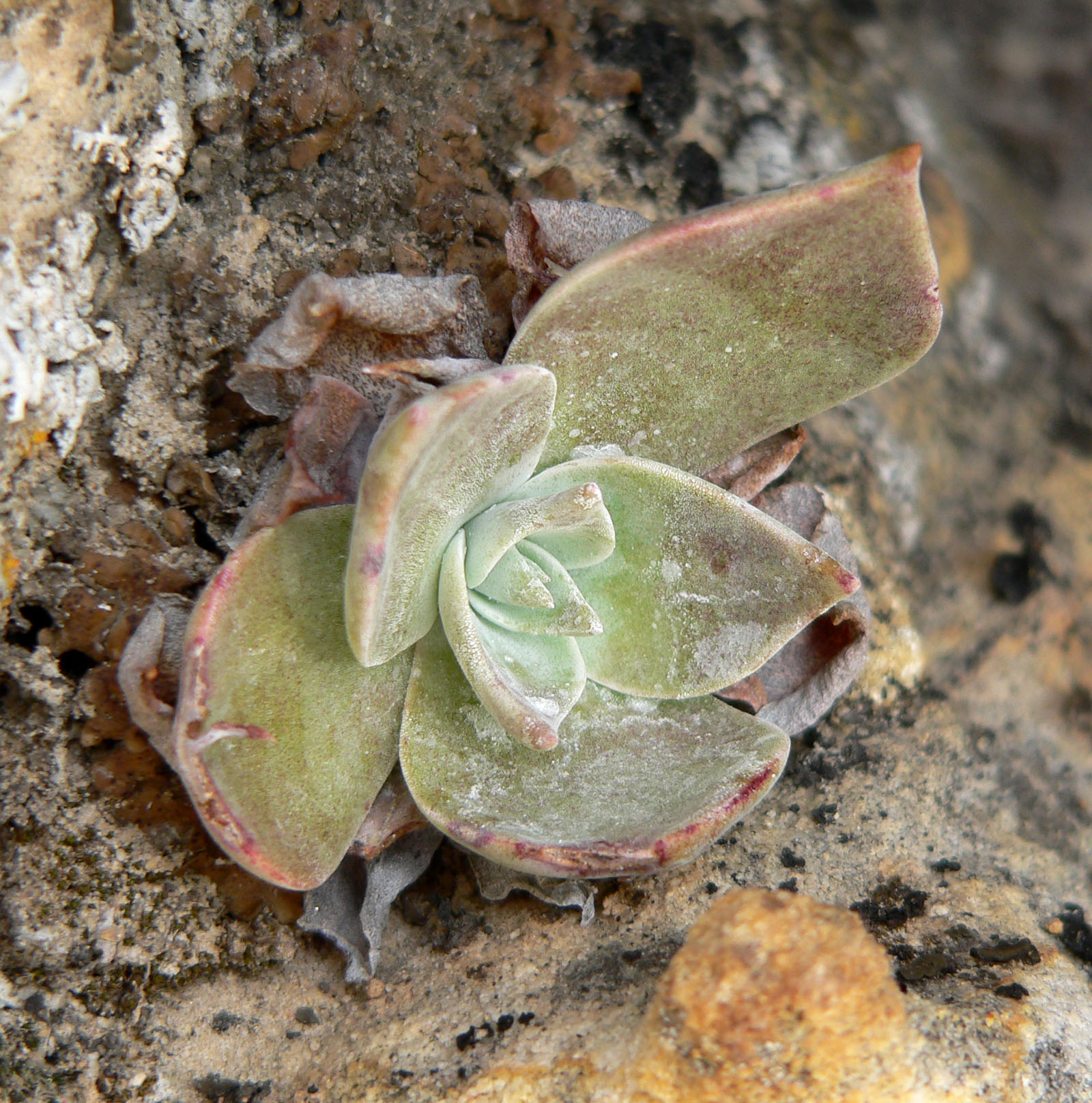
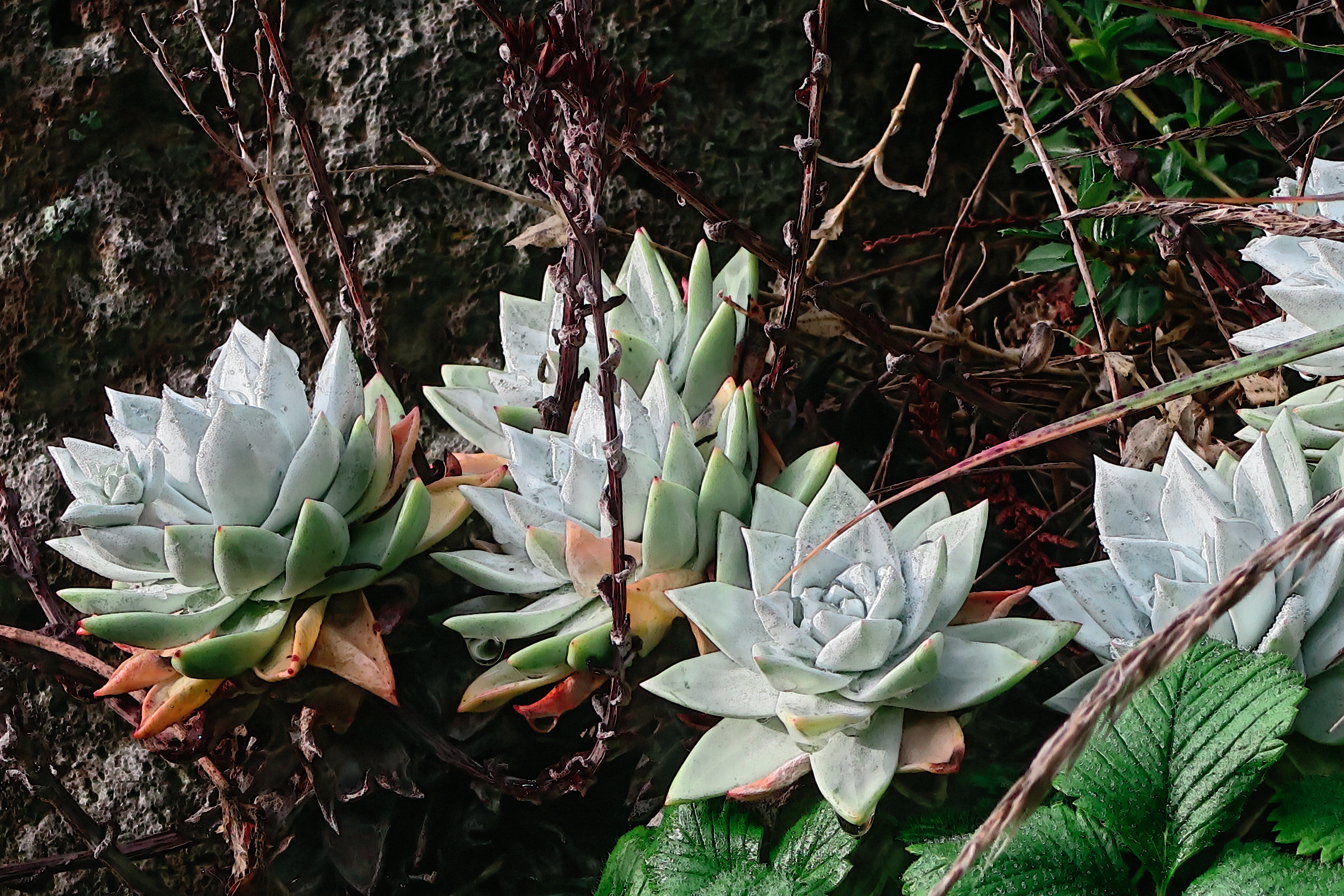

Scientific classification
- Kingdom: Plantae
- Clade: Embryophytes
- Clade: Tracheophytes
- Clade: Spermatophytes
- Clade: Angiosperms
- Clade: Eudicots
- Order: Saxifragales
- Family: Crassulaceae
- Subfamily: Sempervivoideae
- Tribe: Sedeae
- Genus: Dudleya; Britton & Rose

Type species
- Dudleya lanceolata

Diversity
- About 68 taxa
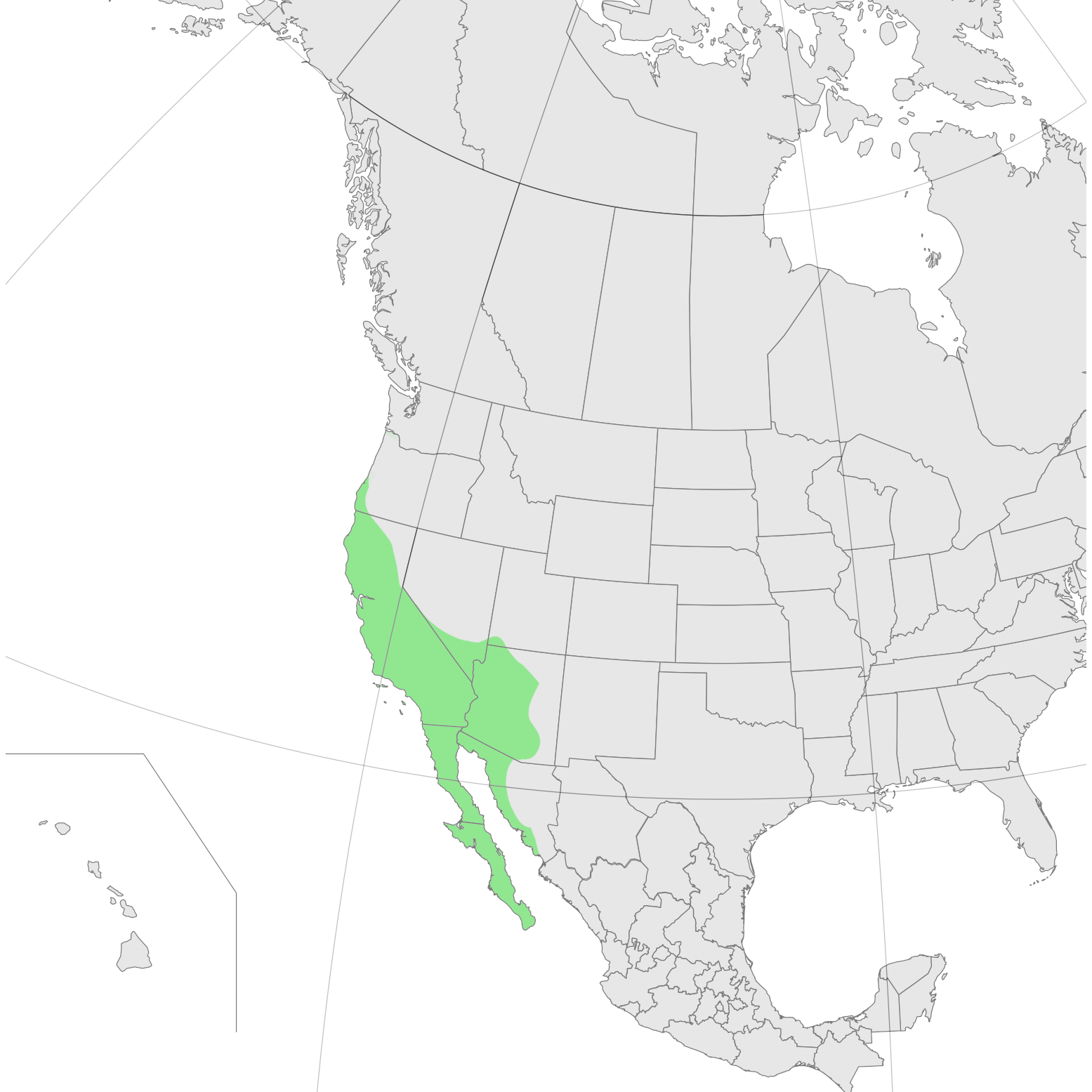
- Distribution of Dudleya within North America

= Dudleya =

Liveforevers

North American succulent genus

Dudleya, commonly known as liveforevers, is a genus of rosette-forming succulent plants in the stonecrop family, Crassulaceae, consisting of about ~70 taxa found in southwestern North America and Guadalupe Island. The genus is very morphologically diverse, with species ranging from large evergreen plants to tiny deciduous geophytic plants. The flowers of Dudleya have parts numbered in fives, with the petals arranged in tubular, star-shaped, or bell-shaped forms and, when fruiting, are filled with tiny, crescent-shaped seeds.

The genus evolved as neoendemics, from ancestors in the stonecrop genus, Sedum. The ancestors probably radiated southward from Sedum during the creation of the dry summer climate, in the California region, five million years ago. Early botanists classified the larger species as Echeveria and Cotyledon, while the geophytic species were placed under Sedum. Taxonomic efforts, started by Joseph Nelson Rose and Nathaniel Lord Britton, created three genera, including Dudleya. These genera were all eventually subsumed into Dudleya proper with the work of Reid Moran. Phylogenetic research is still at an early stage in the genus, and is complicated by the fact that many species are becoming endangered and over-harvested (poached).

Dudleya is a relatively obscure genus, in comparison to other, more widely cultivated succulents; converging interests, by succulent collectors, native plant enthusiasts and gardeners alike, have led to the wider cultivation of many species as ornamental plants. In the wild, many species of Dudleya are vulnerable, as land development and poachers often threaten particularly niche populations of plants. Poached plants are often shipped to East Asia, especially South Korea, where hybridisation and cultivation of succulents is very popular. Conservationists, nurseries and governments combat Dudleya poaching through propagation programs and protection laws.

== Description ==
=== Characteristics and subgenera ===
This genus is the only taxon of the Sedeae tribe to have evolved sympodial branching.

The genus is traditionally divided into three subgenera, two of which were formerly their own genera. The subgenera consist of Dudleya, Stylophyllum, and Hasseanthus.

Subgenera
Dudleya	Stylophyllum	Hasseanthus
The subgenus Dudleya, or the Eududleya, is characterized by broad, flattened leaves, and tight petals on the flower that form a tube (connation). When the flowers go to fruit, they retain the tight and tubular character. The most recognizable plants of this first group would be the chalk dudleya and giant chalk dudleya.	Formerly segregated as the genus Stylophyllum, the plants of this group usually have narrow leaves, often elliptic to round in cross-section, resembling fingers; hence common names like fingertips (Dudleya edulis, also the type species for this subgenus). The flowers have the petals spreading at the middle, and are not arranged connately like in the subgenus Dudleya. However, some plants in this subgenera have flat-leaves, like Dudleya traskiae, and some have campanulate flowers that appear intermediate between Dudleya and Stylophyllum, like Dudleya campanulata. The flowers and fruit of the Stylophyllum are more spreading than in the subgenus Dudleya, but still remain tight towards the base.	Formerly known as the genus Hasseanthus, this grouping is typically distinguished by underground corm-like stems, with small, inconspicuous leaves that usually disappear before flowering, and widely spreading flowers and fruit. The spreading flowers, which resemble those of Sedum, may be a plesiomorphic feature. The seeds are among the largest in the genus. The type species is Hasseanthus variegatus, which is a synonym for Dudleya variegata. Perhaps the most widely known members of the Hasseanthus group are the critically endangered short-leaved dudleya, and Hendrix's dudleya, famous for its name.

==== Epicuticular wax ====
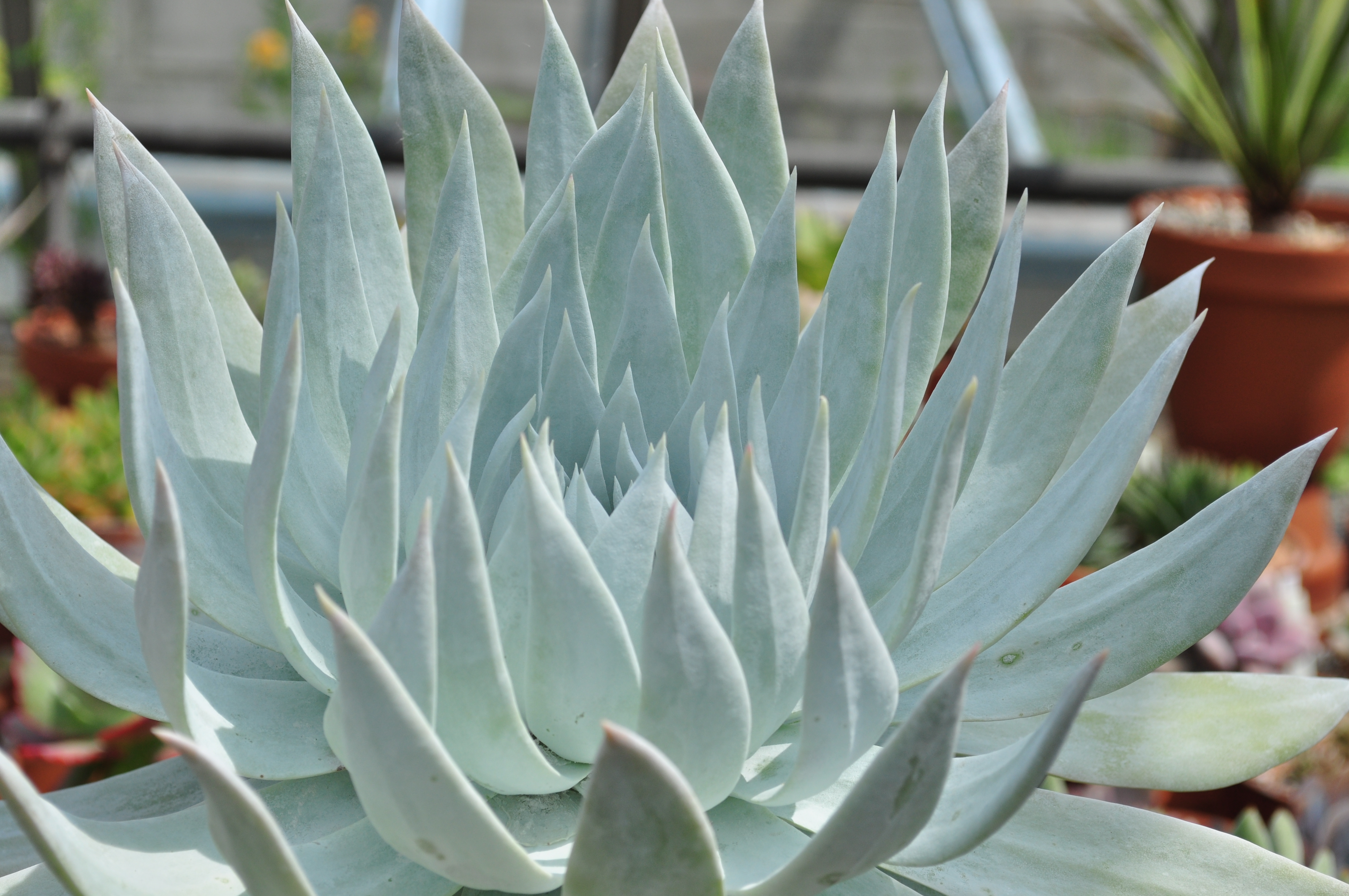
Dudleya brittonii, which has the highest ultraviolet reflectivity ever discovered in a plant.

One of the most famous features of some Dudleya is their waxy coating. Numerous species have their foliage covered in an epicuticular wax, or farina. This waxy coating is usually white, chalky, and mealy, and is the namesake in many epithets, like chalk dudleya, powdery liveforever, and giant chalk dudleya. The wax on the giant chalk dudleya is a surface with some of the highest ultraviolet reflectivity ever discovered in plants. When exposed to water, the wax may coat drops on leaves, preventing their evaporation. The farina is mostly composed of pentacyclic triterpenoids.

Other members, such as D. viscida and D. anomala, have a clear, sticky layer on their foliage. This adhesive layer ultimately helps the plant protect its leaves from the sun, much like ones with "white" wax. It accomplishes this solar protection by allowing dust to adhere to the sticky layer on the leaves, which coats the foliage with dust and debris, blocking solar radiation.

== Taxonomy ==
=== Taxonomic history ===
==== Early history ====
The earliest species of the genus described was Cotyledon caespitosa, by Adrian Hardy Haworth in 1803, which would later be known as Dudleya caespitosa. The same species would later be described again as Sedum cotyledon by Joseph Franz von Jacquin in 1811, and in 1840 Thomas Nuttall described both Echeveria pulverulenta (Dudleya pulverulenta) and Echeveria lanceolata (Dudleya lanceolata). The differing generic placements of these early descriptions suggest that taxonomic disagreements over the genus had an early start, with some of these generic placements persisting even after the proper description of the genus by Britton and Rose.

Nathaniel Lord Britton and Joseph Nelson Rose's revision of the North American Crassulaceae upended many of the early taxonomic classifications, with the newly minted genus Dudleya containing 60 species, of which 41 were newly described by Britton and Rose. The two also defined the related genera Stylophyllum, which contained 12 species, and Hasseanthus, with 4 species. The primary differences between Dudleya and Stylophyllum were between the leaf shape, floral structure and petal orientation, whilst Hasseanthus was characterized by a different vegetative structure and more niche adaptations, primarily corm-like stems and deciduous leaves.

In the 1930s, Alwin Berger revised the status of Dudleya and Stylophyllum into a sectional ranking within Echeveria, while merging the Hasseanthus genera into Sedum. This was in part due to a belief that Dudleya had evolved from Echeveria radiating northward from Mexico, evidenced by the similar tubular corollas, while Hasseanthus possessed aesthetic similarities to Sedum, primarily flowers with broadly spreading petals. Stylophyllum was believed to occupy a transitory position between Dudleya and Hasseanthus. These conclusions were widely accepted by botanists for the first half of the 20th century, until proper molecular and phylogenetic analyses began to appear.

==== Reid Moran, Charles H. Uhl and early phylogenetics ====
In 1942, Reid Moran, a botanist with a longstanding interest in the genera, offered a new revision of the taxa. Moran recognized Dudleya as being distinct from Echeveria, and merged Stylophyllum as a subgenera along with Eududleya (which was changed to just subgenus Dudleya). Moran still recognized Hasseanthus as a separate genus, but realized that it was closely related to Dudleya. With assistance from cytologist Charles H. Uhl, Moran came to the conclusion that Dudleya and Hasseanthus were related closer to each other than they were to Echeveria or Sedum.

As Moran and Uhl conducted more cytological and taxonomic research on the genus, it became clear that Hasseanthus was also a subgenera of Dudleya, citing the karyological uniformity and the formation of hybrids between the genera. In contrast, while Echeveria and Sedum freely hybridize within themselves and each other, all attempts at hybridizing Dudleya with Echeveria have failed. Uhl came to the conclusion that there are probably no intergeneric hybrids with Dudleya, believing that Dudleya had split from Echeveria far enough that intergeneric reproductive success was unlikely. Despite Uhl's research, he still believed that Dudleya had evolved northward from Mexico with Echeveria, probably some time before the formation of the summer-dry climate of California, making Dudleya a paleoendemic.

==== Modern classifications and phylogenetic research ====
Around 1993, one of the only literary treatments of the genus was written, Paul H. Thomson's Dudleya and Hasseanthus Handbook. In the book, Thompson made numerous changes and adjustments to species, and described several new species. The book included a large number of photographs, extensive descriptions, and horticultural practices for the care of Dudleya, derived from a long interest growing, visiting and collecting the plants. However, he failed to follow the International Code of Botanical Nomenclature guidelines for describing new taxa, forgoing designated type specimens, which invalidated his treatment. His treatment also contains extensive pseudoscientific material, including references to the lost continents of Atlantis, Lemuria and Mu, a belief that cosmic rays and divine intervention directly induced the chromosome counts and evolution of Hasseanthus and Dudleya, and criticism of paleontologists and the scientifically accepted age of the Earth.

Later research challenged the notion that Dudleya and Echeveria formed two distinct lineages within Echeverioideae. Joachim Thiede instead proposed that Dudleya evolved completely independently from Echeveria, evolving from relatives within the Leucosedum clade like Sedum moranii. This places Dudleya as a neoendemic that evolved recently with the formation of the summer-dry climate in California. This was evidenced by the similarities of seed-surface ornamentation between Dudleya and Sedum, which is unlike Echeveria, and the reproductive isolation between Echeveria and Dudleya.

Research in the 21st century has supported the hypothesis of Dudleya's relation to Sedum. Phylogenetic analysis has given weight to this hypothesis, concluding that Dudleya is much closer to North American members of Sedoideae than to Echeverioideae. The plant Sedum spathulifolium, which co-exists with Dudleya in Oregon and California, has been shown in multiple phylogenetic reconstructions to be a sister taxon to Dudleya, although it may not be the true sister taxon, as larger samplings are needed. Berger's hypothesis of a relationship between Hasseanthus and Sedum may still prove true, as in addition to morphological similarities, the Hasseanthus-type taxa could be basal to the genus. However, no truly conclusive evidence of significant divergence within Dudleya exists, and it remains unclear which groups are basal or derived.

=== Selected species ===
- Dudleya abramsii
  - Dudleya abramsii subsp. abramsii – Abrams' liveforever
  - Dudleya abramsii subsp. affinis – San Bernardino Mountains liveforever
  - Dudleya abramsii subsp. bettinae – Betty's dudleya
  - Dudleya abramsii subsp. calcicola – limestone dudleya
  - Dudleya abramsii subsp. murina – Mouse-gray dudleya
  - Dudleya abramsii subsp. setchellii – Santa Clara Valley dudleya
- Dudleya acuminata – Vizcaino liveforever
- Dudleya albiflora– White-flower liveforever
- Dudleya anomala – Todos Santos liveforever
- Dudleya anthonyi – Anthony's liveforever
- Dudleya attenuata – Orcutt's liveforever, tapertip liveforever
- Dudleya arizonica – Arizona chalk dudleya. Formerly a subspecies of Dudleya pulverulenta.
- Dudleya blochmaniae – Blochman's liveforever, Blochman's dudleya
- Dudleya brevifolia – Short-leaved liveforever, short-leaved dudleya. Formerly a subspecies of D. blochmaniae.
- Dudleya brittonii – Britton's dudleya, giant chalk dudleya
- Dudleya caespitosa – Coast dudleya, sea lettuce, sand lettuce
- Dudleya campanulata – Punta Banda liveforever
- Dudleya candelabrum – Candleholder liveforever
- Dudleya candida – Coronados liveforever
- Dudleya cedrosensis
- Dudleya crassifolia – Thick-leaf dudleya
- Dudleya cultrata – Knife-leaved liveforever, maritime succulent liveforever
- Dudleya cymosa – Canyon liveforever
  - Dudleya cymosa subsp. agourensis – Agoura Hills dudleya
  - Dudleya cymosa subsp. crebrifolia – San Gabriel River dudleya
  - Dudleya cymosa subsp. costatifolia – Pierpoint Springs dudleya
  - Dudleya cymosa subsp. cymosa – Coast Range dudleya
  - Dudleya cymosa subsp. marcescens – Marcescent dudleya
  - Dudleya cymosa. subsp. ovatifolia – Santa Monica Mountains dudleya
  - Dudleya cymosa subsp. paniculata – Diablo range dudleya
  - Dudleya cymosa subsp. pumila – Transverse ranges liveforever
- Dudleya densiflora – San Gabriel Mountains liveforever
- Dudleya edulis – Fingertips, lady fingers, San Diego dudleya
- Dudleya farinosa – Bluff lettuce, powdery liveforever, powdery dudleya
- Dudleya formosa – La Mision liveforever
- Dudleya gatesii – Gates' liveforever
- Dudleya gnoma – Munchkin dudleya
- Dudleya greenei – Greene's dudleya
- Dudleya guadalupensis – Guadalupe liveforever
- Dudleya ingens – Baja liveforever, rock liveforever
- Dudleya hendrixii – Hendrix's liveforever
- Dudleya lanceolata – Lanceleaf liveforever.
- Dudleya linearis – San Benito Island liveforever
- Dudleya multicaulis – Many-stemmed dudleya
- Dudleya nubigena – Cape liveforever
- Dudleya nesiotica – Santa Cruz Island liveforever
- Dudleya pachyphytum – Cedros Island dudleya
- Dudleya palmeri – Palmer's liveforever
- Dudleya parva – Conejo dudleya
- Dudleya pauciflora– Few-flower liveforever
- Dudleya pulverulenta – Chalk lettuce, chalk dudleya, chalk liveforever
- Dudleya rigida – Sierra de la Laguna liveforever
- Dudleya rigidiflora – Playa Maria liveforever
- Dudleya rubens – Red flowering liveforever
- Dudleya saxosa – Panamint liveforever
  - Dudleya saxosa subsp. collomiae – Gila County liveforever
  - Dudleya saxosa subsp. aloides – Desert liveforever
  - Dudleya saxosa subsp. saxosa – Panamint liveforever
- Dudleya stolonifera – Laguna Beach liveforever
- Dudleya traskiae – Santa Barbara Island liveforever
- Dudleya variegata – Variegated liveforever
- Dudleya verityi – Verity's liveforever
- Dudleya virens – Alabaster plant, Island liveforever
- Dudleya viridicata – Colonet liveforever
- Dudleya viridis
- Dudleya viscida – Sticky dudleya

=== Etymology ===
The genus is named after William Russel Dudley, the first head of the botany department at Stanford University. The term liveforever may refer to the longevity and hardiness of some plants in the wild.

The name of the subgenera Stylophyllum is an allusion to the pencil-shaped leaves of the type species, Stylophyllum edule, now known as Dudleya edulis.

The name of the subgenera Hasseanthus was in honor of Dr. Hermann E. Hasse, a surgeon and collector of California flora. Dudleya virens subsp. hassei is also named after him.

==== Nomenclature ====
- English: Dudleya, liveforever
- Spanish: siempreviva, mezcalito
- Tiipai: milhka’mey (wide-leaf); milh kajmila (narrow-leaf)
- Paipai: awi mielh

== Reproductive biology ==
=== Pollinators and flower morphology ===
The pollinators of Dudleya are mostly hummingbirds and bees, although this has been inferred in some species only from flower morphology. The genus exhibits a wide array of diverse flower varieties, even within species complexes. The flowers are mostly hermaphroditic, although some individuals may have sterile anthers. Plants with long, tubular, reddish flowers, mostly in the subgenus Dudleya, are adapted towards pollination via hummingbirds, while short, spreading, yellow flowers favor pollination by insects. Despite the evolution of long flowers towards hummingbirds, the long flowers also show no performance disadvantage in pollination environments exclusively composed of insects. While the long flowers may provide an evolutionary advantage for more effective pollination, more energy is required to produce the larger amounts of floral tissue.

The flower morphology of Dudleya also corresponds with the aforementioned groups of Hasseanthus, Stylophyllum, and Dudleya. The flowers in Hasseanthus and Stylophyllum are broad, white to yellow, and spreading, with bumblebees and bees as primary pollinators, and hummingbirds as occasional pollinators. As these species grade towards the subgenus Dudleya, the petals begin to fuse at the base, with the flowers becoming tubular and red, due to an association with hummingbird pollinators. This shift in pollinators corresponds to larger nectar volumes and higher energy contents in accordance with the demands of hummingbird pollinators.

=== Seeds ===
Seed morphology also differs between Dudleya. Larger Dudleya have noticeably smaller seeds; this is likely a result of an evolutionary tradeoff. The investment in growing large allows plants to retain moisture in periods of drought, at the cost of energy placed into reproduction. Other reasons for smaller seeds may also be due to allocation of resources into vegetative reproduction via pup rosettes, instead of sexual reproduction. In contrast, the small, inconspicuous, Hasseanthus-type members produce the largest seeds in the genus. These larger seeds are not distributed very far, which contributes to the restricted ranges of the Hasseanthus subgenus.

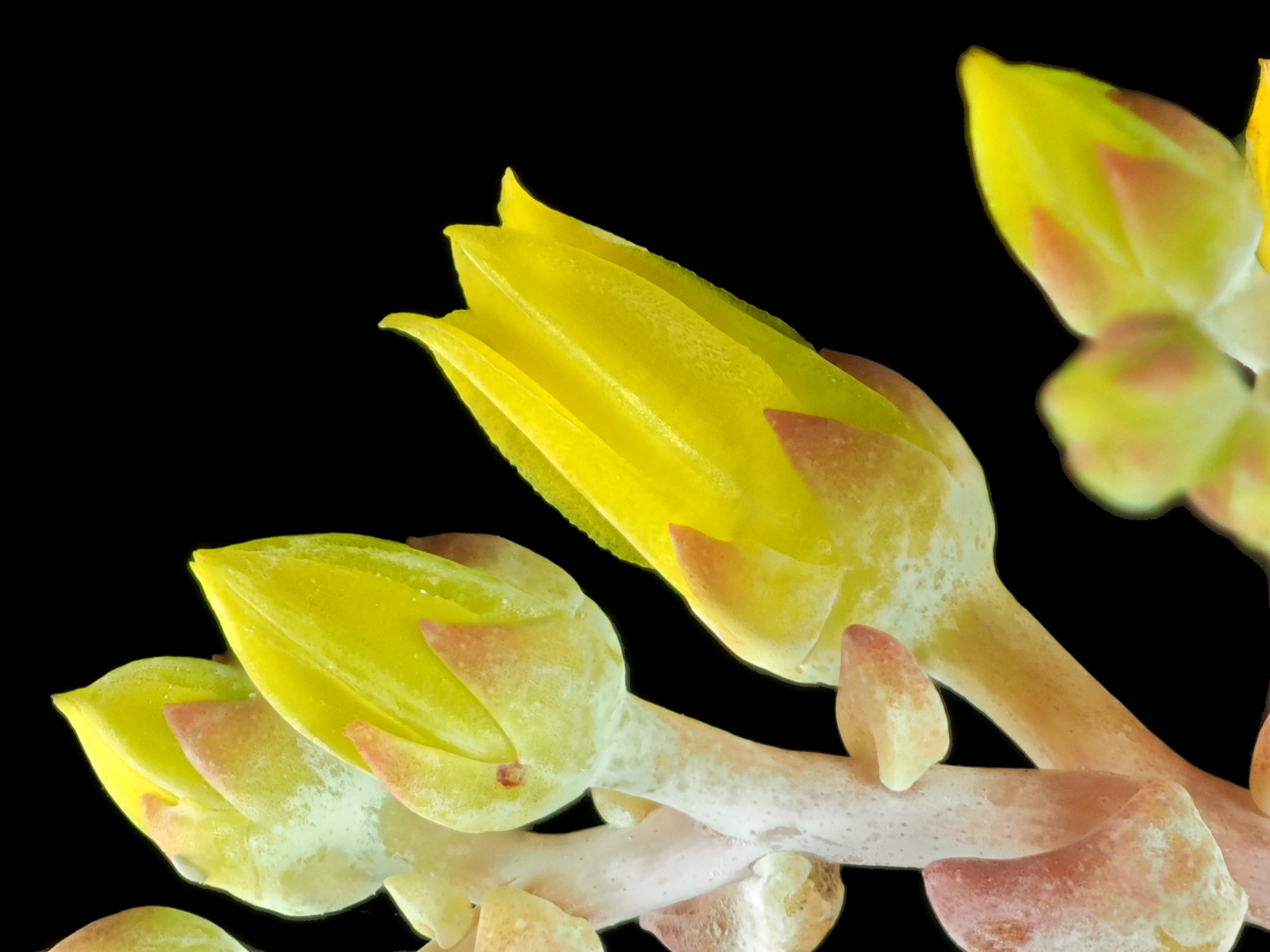
subg. Dudleya — The flowers of Dudleya caespitosa

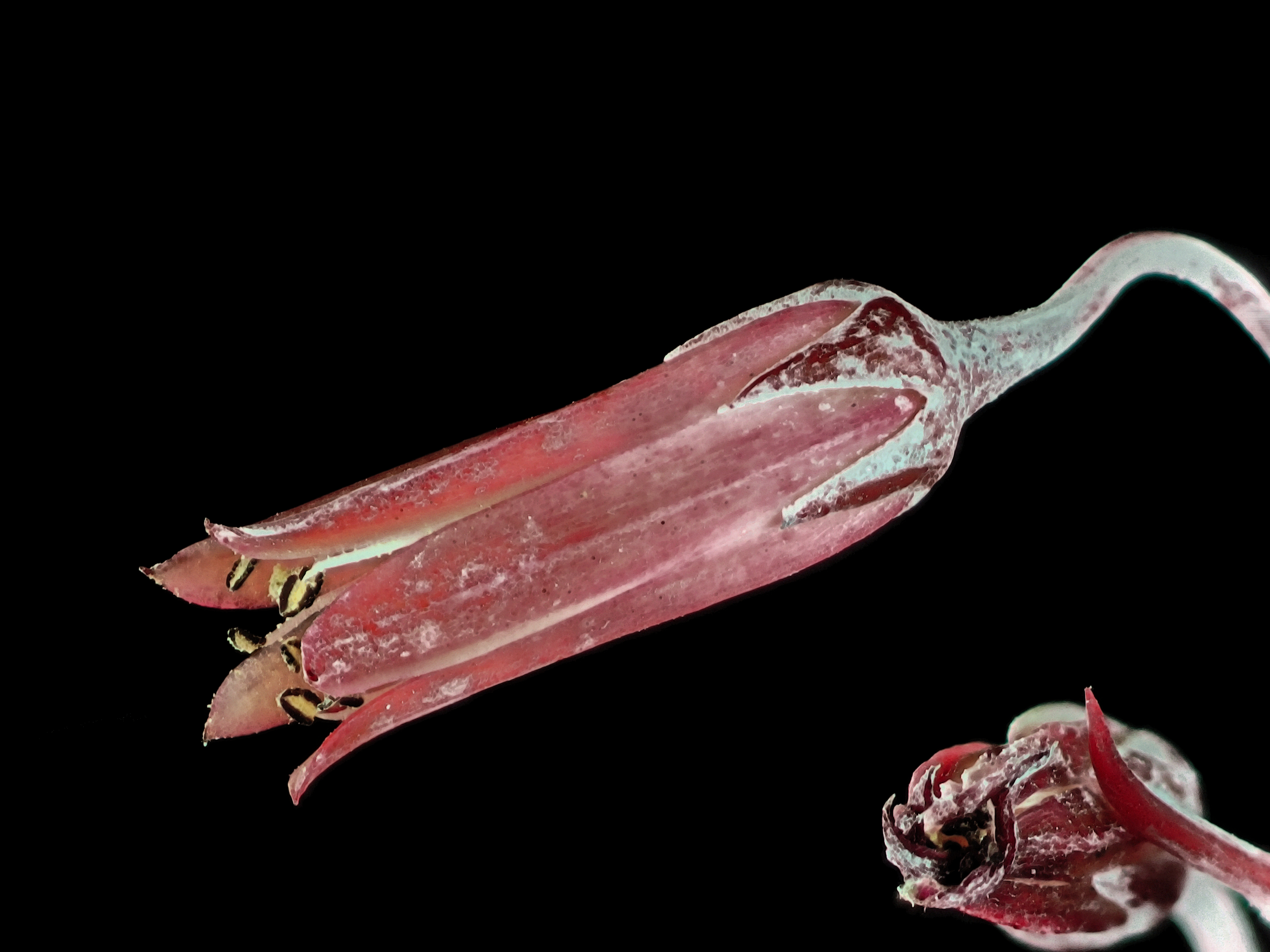
subg. Dudleya — The flowers of Dudleya anthonyi

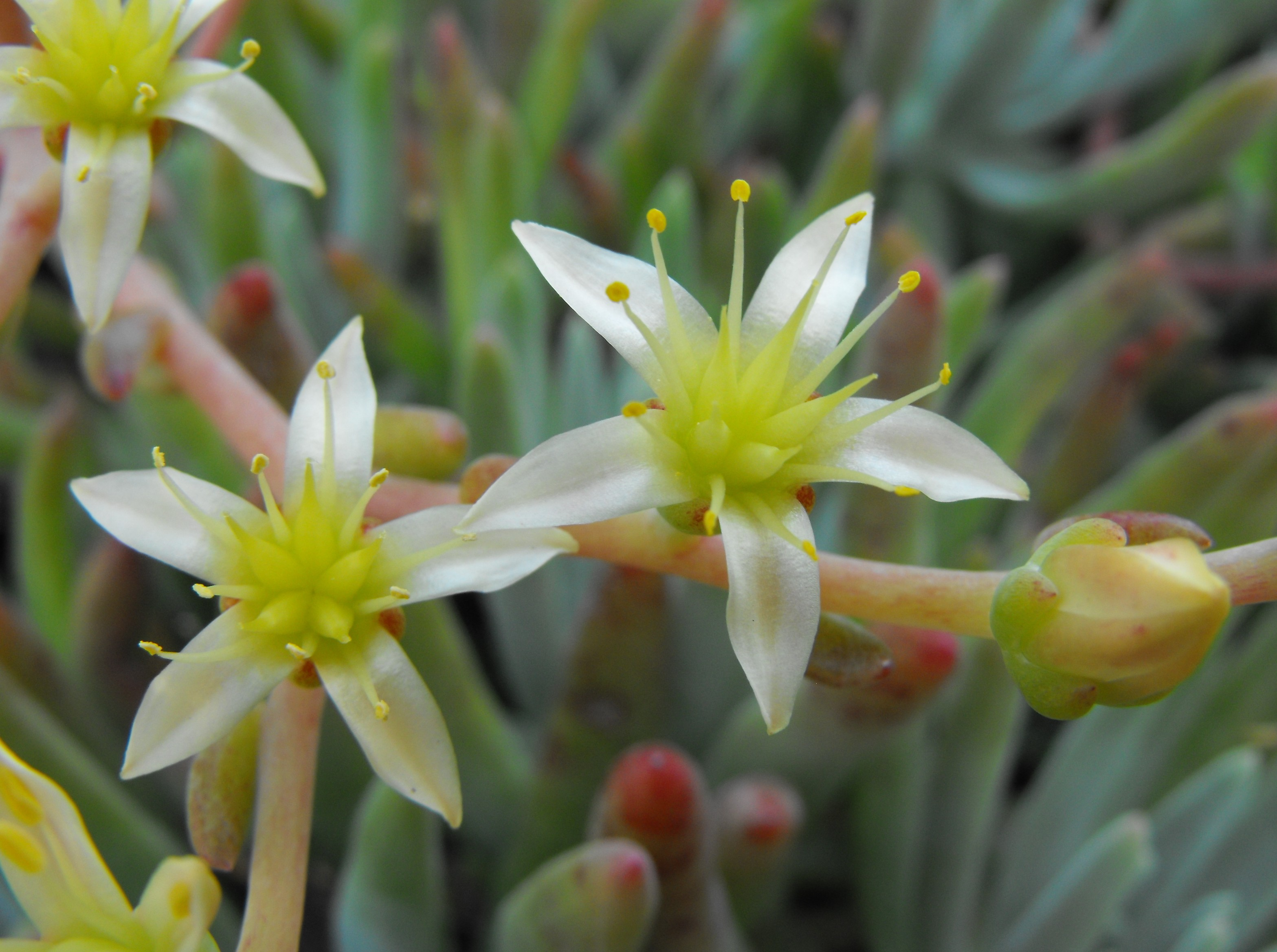
subg. Stylophyllum — The flowers of Dudleya edulis

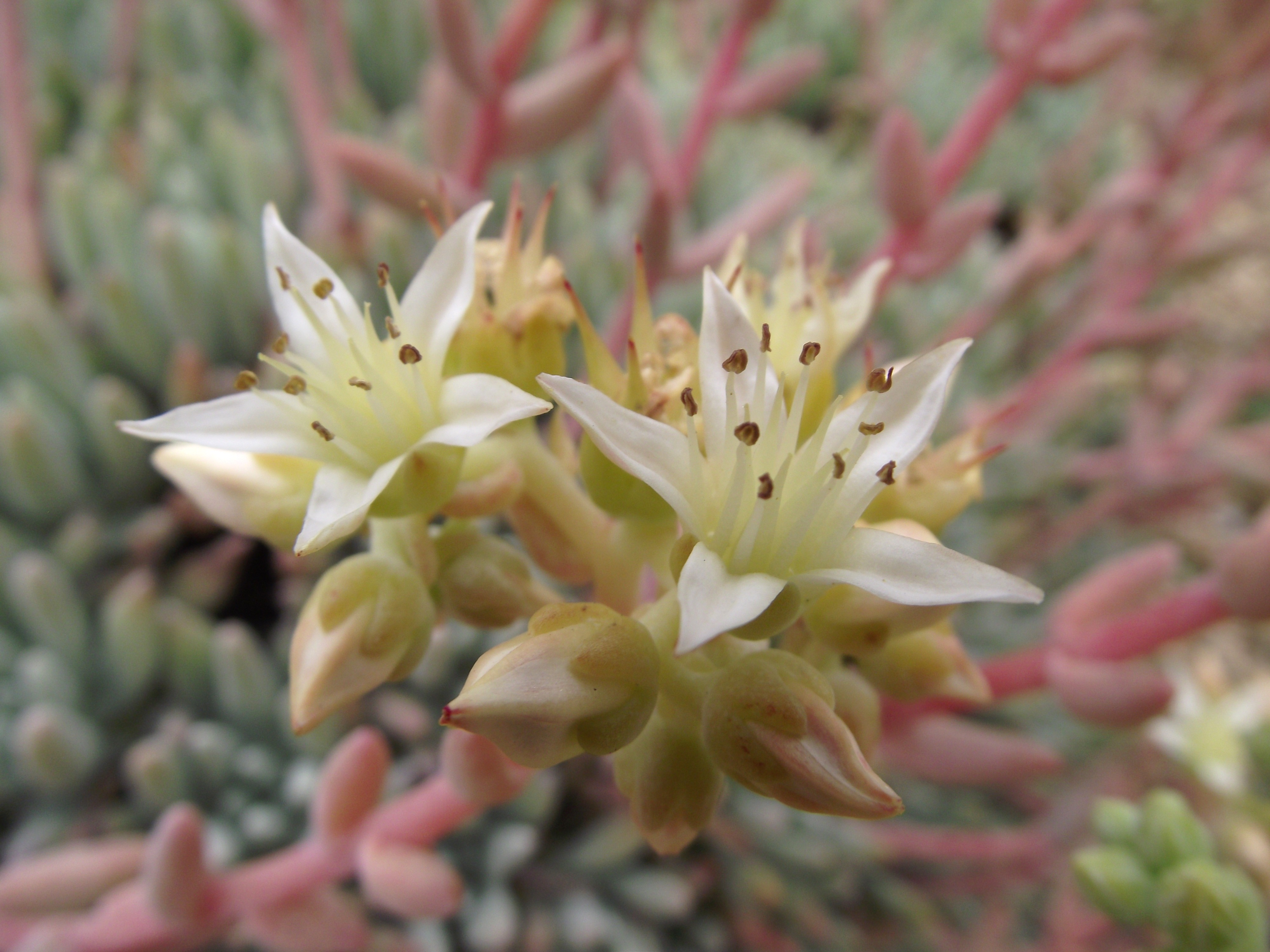
subg. Stylophyllum — The flowers of Dudleya virens subsp. hassei

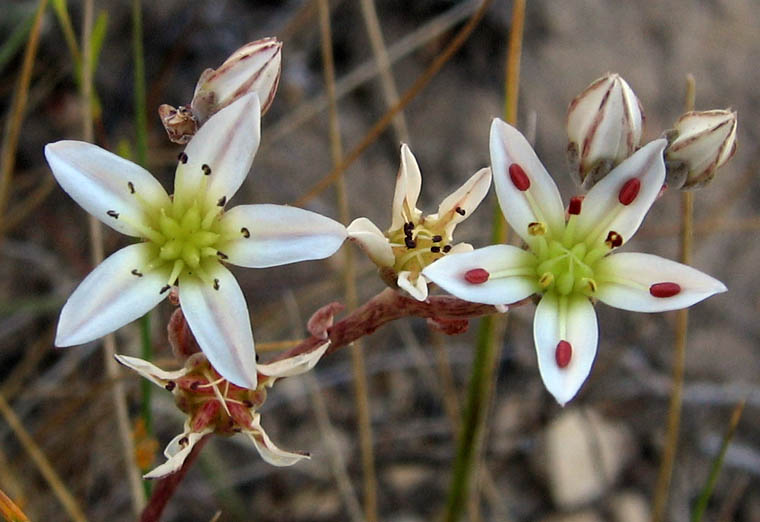
subg. Hasseanthus — The flowers of Dudleya blochmaniae

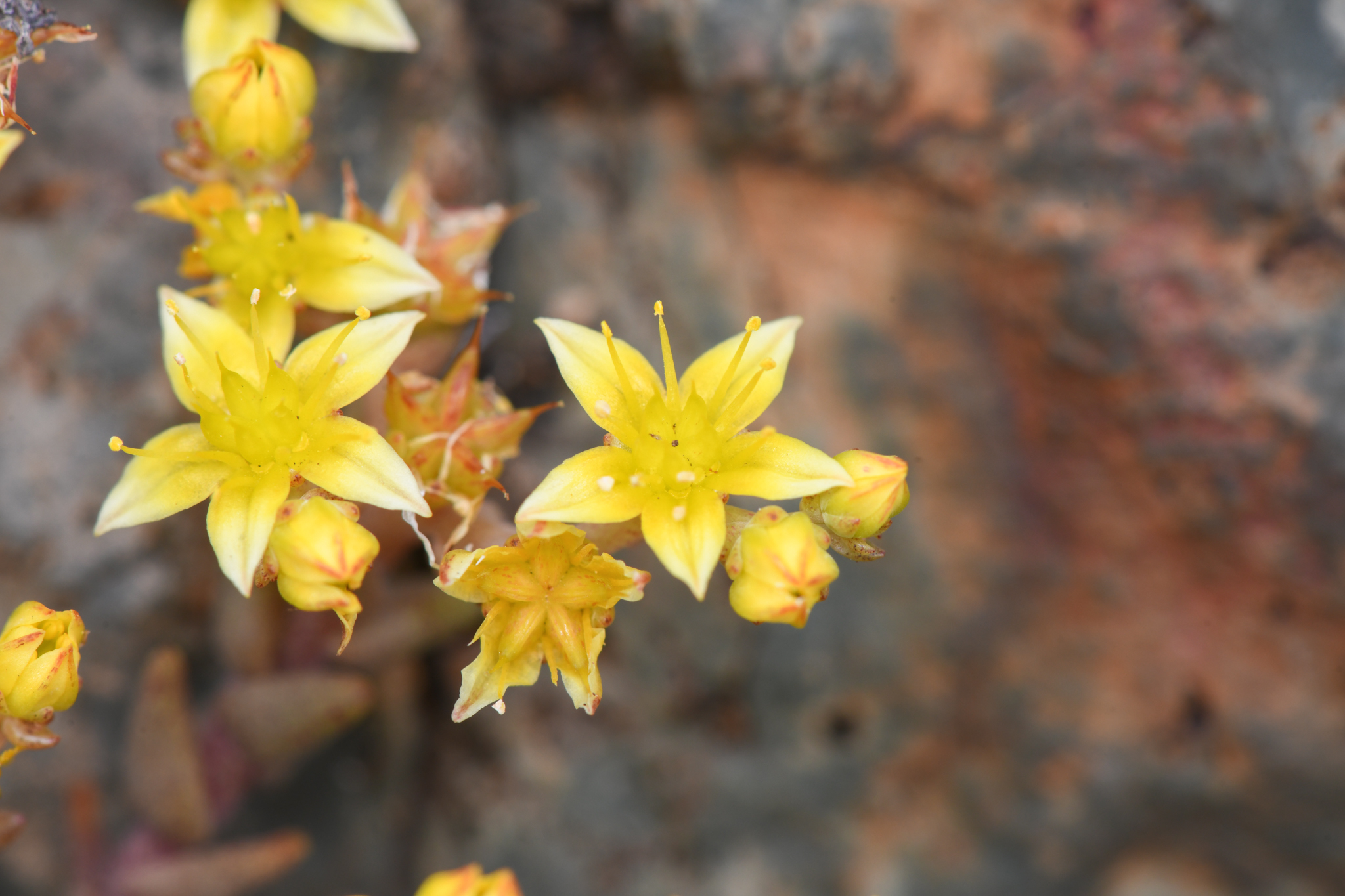
subg. Hasseanthus - The flowers of Dudleya variegata

== Distribution and habitat ==
Dudleya species are widespread and diverse in their range, but are typically found in rock outcroppings, cliff faces, or road cuts, where their leaves help them store water in a setting too dry for most types of plants. Most are small and inconspicuous when not in bloom. The two predominant habitats where plants of this genera may be found are by the coast or mountains. Dudleya favor moderate temperatures, summer dormancy, winter precipitation, and rocky habitats, which means they may be found in diverse, disjunct locales from oceanic bluffs on the California coast to sky islands in Arizona.

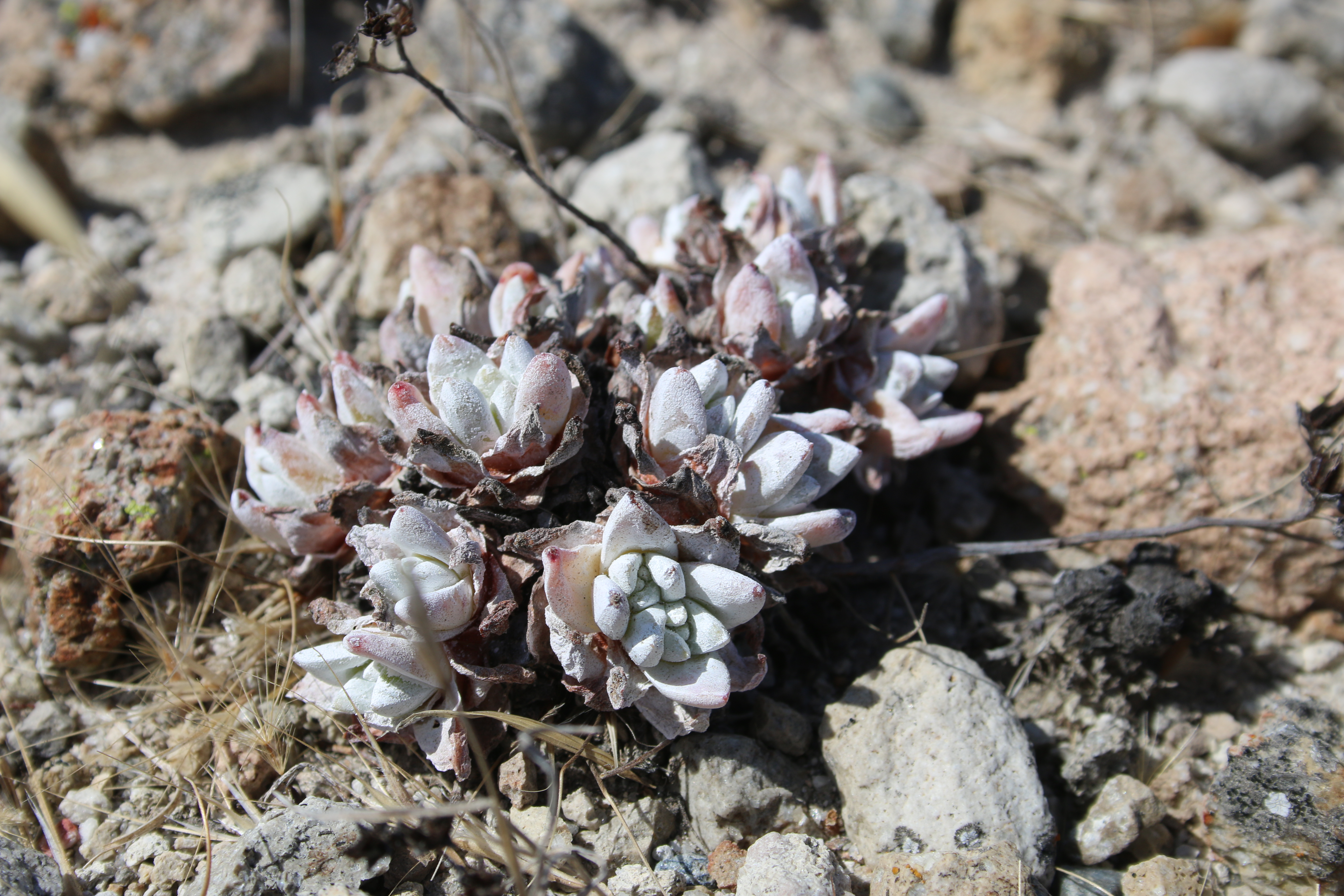
Dudleya gnoma, which grows on Miocene volcanic substrates on Santa Rosa Island

Regions where Dudleya can be found include The Californias, Arizona, coastal Sonora and Oregon, and southern Utah and Nevada. The diversity of species of Dudleya is centered in Southern California and northern Baja California.

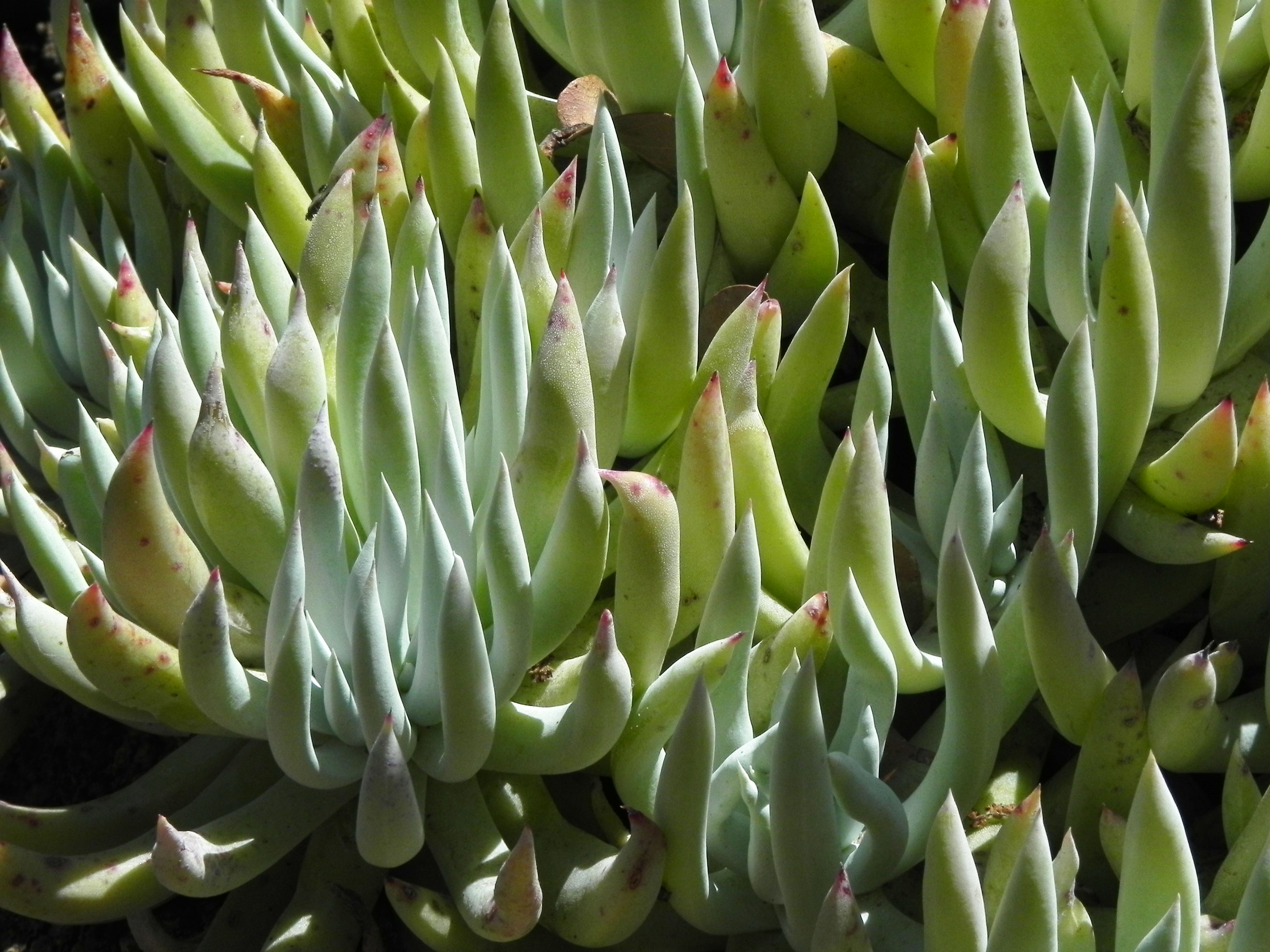
Dudleya albiflora, found on the Baja California peninsula

== Horticulture ==
=== Watering ===
In horticulture, Dudleya should be planted at an angle. This allows accumulated water to drain from the nestlike center of the plant, thus preventing microbial decay. Dudleya should not be watered from directly above, as this may damage their chalky coating known as farina, which is present on numerous species.

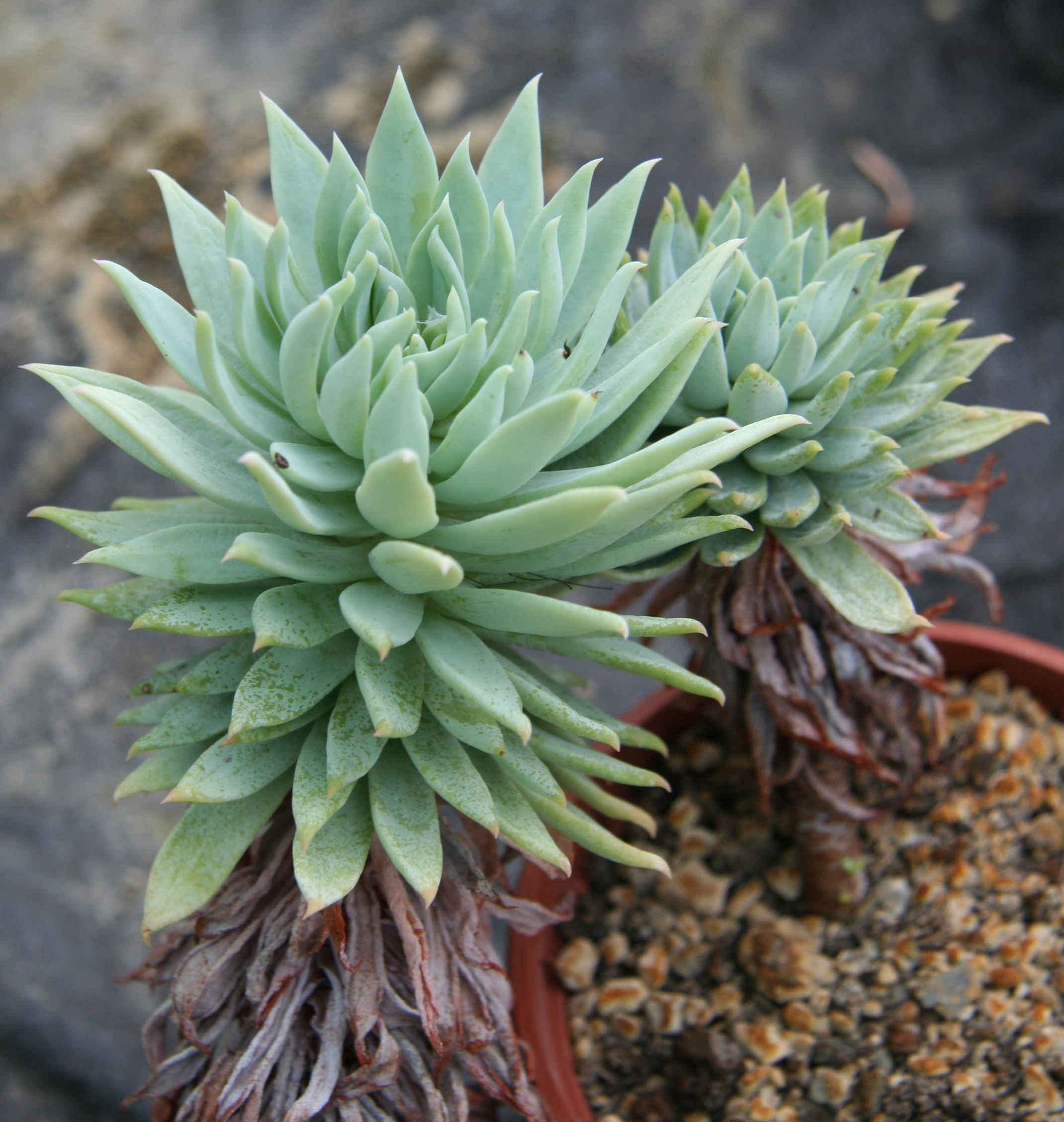
Dudleya candida in cultivation

During the late fall to early spring period of growing, watering should be done frequently in order to promote good growth and flower development. Plants grown with exposure to rainfall, provided they are in a Mediterranean climate, they may obtain optimum moisture. In contrast, plants grown indoors or in greenhouses should be watered to ensure that the plant maximizes growth.

During the dormant period, from late spring to fall, watering should be limited to bi-weekly intervals, but not completely cut out. In nature, plants may completely desiccate themselves during the dormant period. Deciduous members of the genus in the Hasseanthus grouping should not be watered at all during dormancy.

=== Growing medium ===
Growing mediums should attempt to imitate the preferred soil of each species in nature. The most essential element for the medium is good drainage. Good drainage is important, as Dudleya are very susceptible to mold and fungi. How quickly the medium drains should be determined by the amount of shade in the location, which affects the rate of evaporation that the soil will go through. Thus, well-shaded Dudleya must have excellent drainage.

Fertilizers may be used to maintain good color and growth, but they should be diluted.

Clay is preferable to plastic pots when growing the plants due to the advantages with water drainage. Plastic pots may also kill the plants by overheating the roots.

Mealybugs and aphids are main pests of Dudleya. Powdery mildew has also been recorded in cultivated Dudleya.

=== Shade ===
The amount of shade a species of Dudleya requires is dependent on the location. Plants growing in coastal regions may require little shade at all, whilst plants growing in the deserts, inland valleys and mountains will require shade. The majority of plants in the genus will appreciate north-facing sites and shade during the heat of the day. During the summer months, 50% shade may be beneficial for plants. If a cold-tolerant Dudleya is grown during a freeze or snow, it should be shaded as not to damage the plant, as a quick thaw may be detrimental.

=== Propagation ===
Unlike their related genera Echeveria, many Dudleya cannot be propagated through leaf cuttings. Propagation is mostly achieved via offsets, germination by seed, or in nurseries, plant tissue culture.

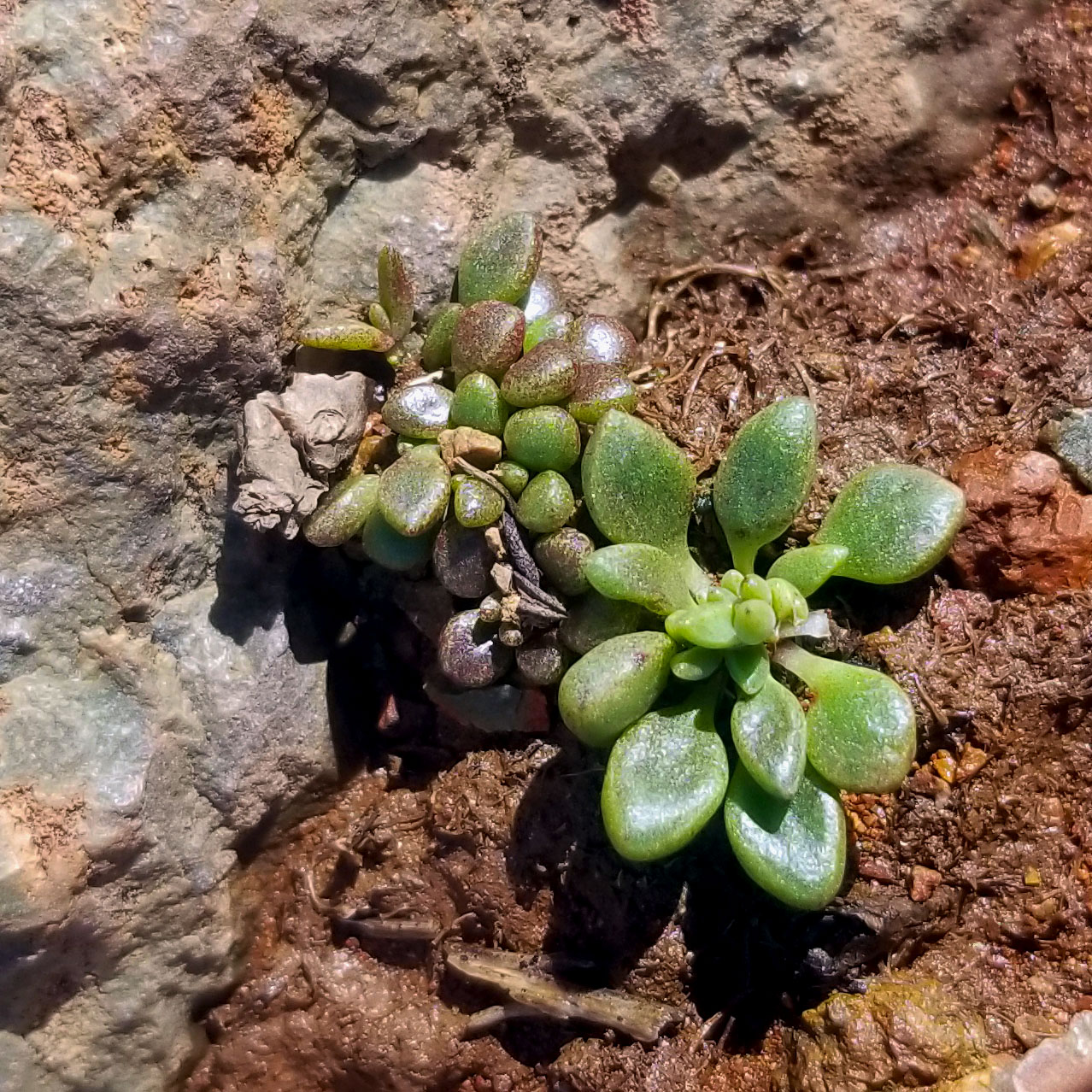
Dudleya variegata, one of the few species that can be propagated from the leaves

==== Sexual reproduction ====
Dudleya seeds are crescent shaped and near-microscopic, and can be collected by taking the dried flower buds and crushing the ovules inside, which can contain hundreds of seeds. Seeds can be sown into a soilless medium, such as pumice or vermiculite, after which germination can occur within a week to 10 days.

==== Asexual reproduction ====
Vegetative reproduction may occur in multiple ways:

1. The rosette of the plant divides into two, eventually branching off to develop two separate rosettes.
2. Plantlets will form in the axillary buds of old leaves around the primary rosettes, forming as many as 10 new rosettes.
3. After a wildfire, when the plant has its main rosettes burned off, new ones will emerge from either the stem or the roots, forming a new plant within a single growing season.
4. Rosettes emerge out of a long, horizontal root. This is commonplace when the plant has been decapitated on a cliff face, leaving only the long roots, which send out rosettes.
5. Plants multiply via stoloniferous growth. Many Dudleya may send out stoloniferous rosettes, but they do not root. Only does the Laguna Beach Liveforever (Dudleya stolonifera) sprout roots out of stoloniferous plantlets, yet this can be difficult or impossible to induce in captivity.
6. When the underground portion of the plant is lost to root rot, but the rosette and part of the caudex survive, the parts above the decayed roots can be removed cleanly, and planted provided they send out roots. Conversely, should the top of the rosette die but the lower stem still live, the deceased portion may be removed, a depression will remain in the caudex where the decayed rosette was removed, and at the edges new buds will sprout.
7. Propagation via leaves. Only certain species, like those of the Hasseanthus subgenus and others like Dudleya parva, will root. Most Dudleya will not reproduce from leaves, with the leaves simply dying after being severed.
8. Plant tissue culture methods are also available, and becoming more advanced. Currently, plant tissue culture is used for Dudleya propagation in commercial and conservation settings.

== Ethnobotany ==
=== Kumeyaay and Paipai ===
The indigenous peoples of the Kumeyaay and Paipai region utilized the genus for both medicinal and agricultural purposes. The tender, succulent leaves were chewed on to alleviate thirst, or used to treat calluses and corns. The budding inflorescences, in their early stages, were used as food, with a sweet flavor and juicy texture. The roots were pounded up and soaked in water, used as an astringent to "tighten the gums." The roots were also boiled whole as a decoction for asthma.

== Conservation ==
Several species of Dudleya are threatened by urban development in Coastal California and Mexico, and anthropogenic-induced wildfires. However, one of the most critical threats to Dudleya species is poaching, partially caused by a demand from East Asian succulent collectors paying lucrative prices for certain Dudleya species.

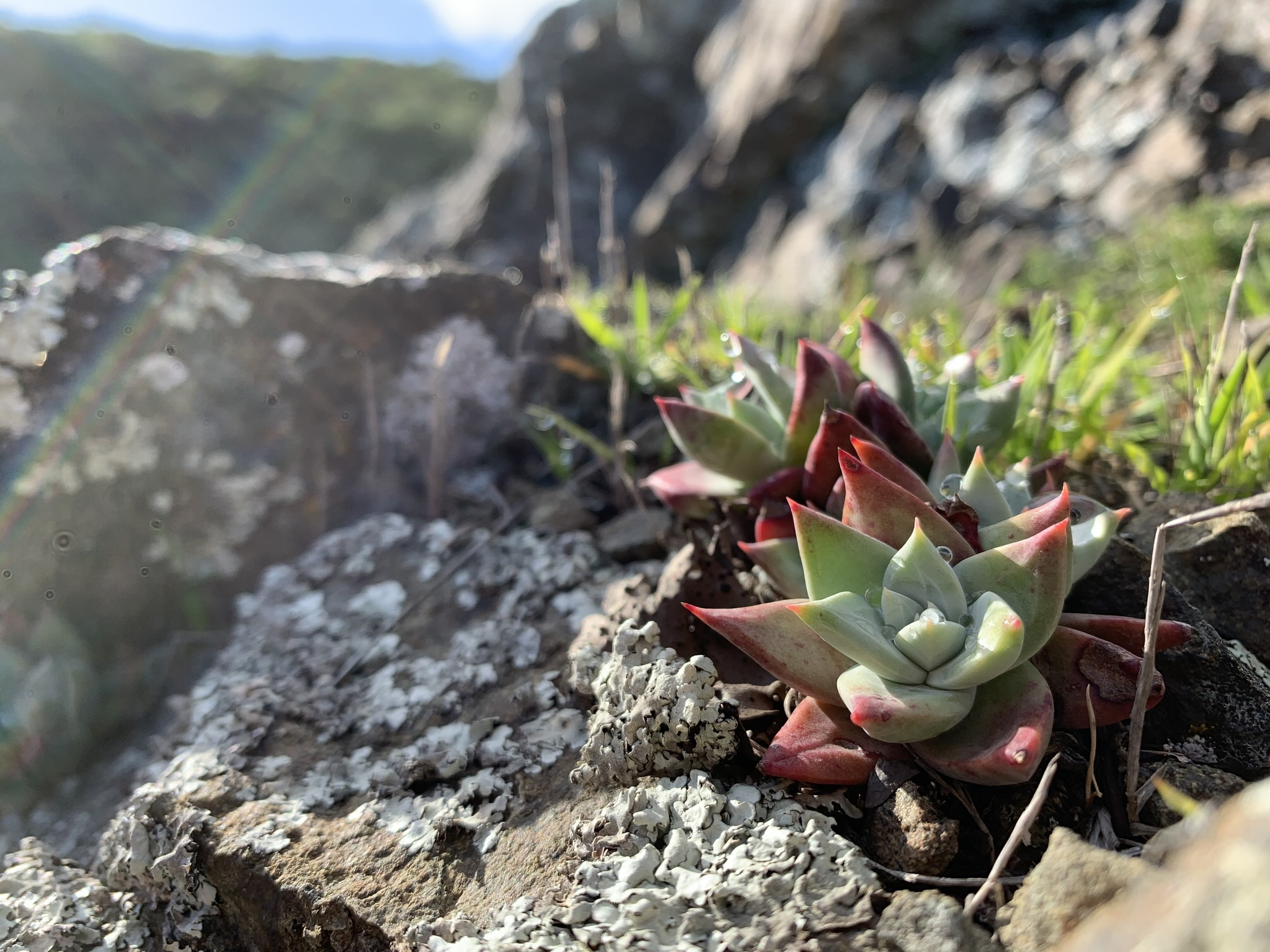
Dudleya farinosa, which was threatened by poachers

The population of Verity's liveforever (Dudleya verityi), which was nearly wiped out during the 2013 Springs Fire, was targeted by poachers.

The Cedros Island liveforever (Dudleya pachyphytum) is a rare and extremely specialized Dudleya endemic to Cedros Island. In 2016, Korean nationals began moving to Bahia Tortugas, a locality in Baja California Sur, to facilitate the poaching and shipping of the plants. The species was seriously threatened after Mexican soldiers discovered poachers taking nearly 5,000 rosettes in a tractor-trailer. It was suspected the poachers rappelled onto the succulent's location via helicopter, as D. pachyphytum occupies a nearly inaccessible habitat. In 2019, the deaths and injuries of several fishermen from Bahía Tortugas who were on Cedros Island was allegedly the result of Dudleya trafficking, a conflict with the Sinaloa Cartel, or both. In 2020, the Mexican Navy in the Second Naval Region revealed that two fishermen were killed after a dispute emerged over the trafficking of the rare plant.

Bluff lettuce (Dudleya farinosa) was also targeted by poachers in numerous large-scale operations. Although not particularly rare, the size of the poaching operation pose a serious ecological threat. Starting in 2017, the U.S. Customs and Border Protection, along with the California Department of Fish and Wildlife, discovered large amounts of D. farinosa being shipped out of the country. South Korean and Chinese nationals have both been arrested in the smuggling of D. farinosa. According to nursery owners responsible for legally exporting Dudleya, buyers in Asia desired plants directly from the wild, owing to the aesthetic quality of their long caudices and weathered leaves.

The candleholder dudleya (Dudleya candelabrum), native to the northern Channel Islands, was reported to have been poached, with the thieves shipping plants to South Korea.

In response to the poaching of Dudleya, California State Assembly member Chris Ward proposed Bill AB-223, sponsored by the California Native Plant Society, which would make it illegal to poach Dudleya from state or private lands without a permit. The California Native Plant Society and conservationists have also initiated propagation programs to oversaturate the market as a means to deter poachers. On September 28, 2021, governor Gavin Newsom signed AB-223 into law.

== See also ==
- Sedum, a genus related to Dudleya.
- Echeveria, a genus similar to Dudleya.
- Reid Moran, who contributed greatly to the taxonomy of the genus.
- Nathaniel Lord Britton and Joseph Nelson Rose, who described the genus.
