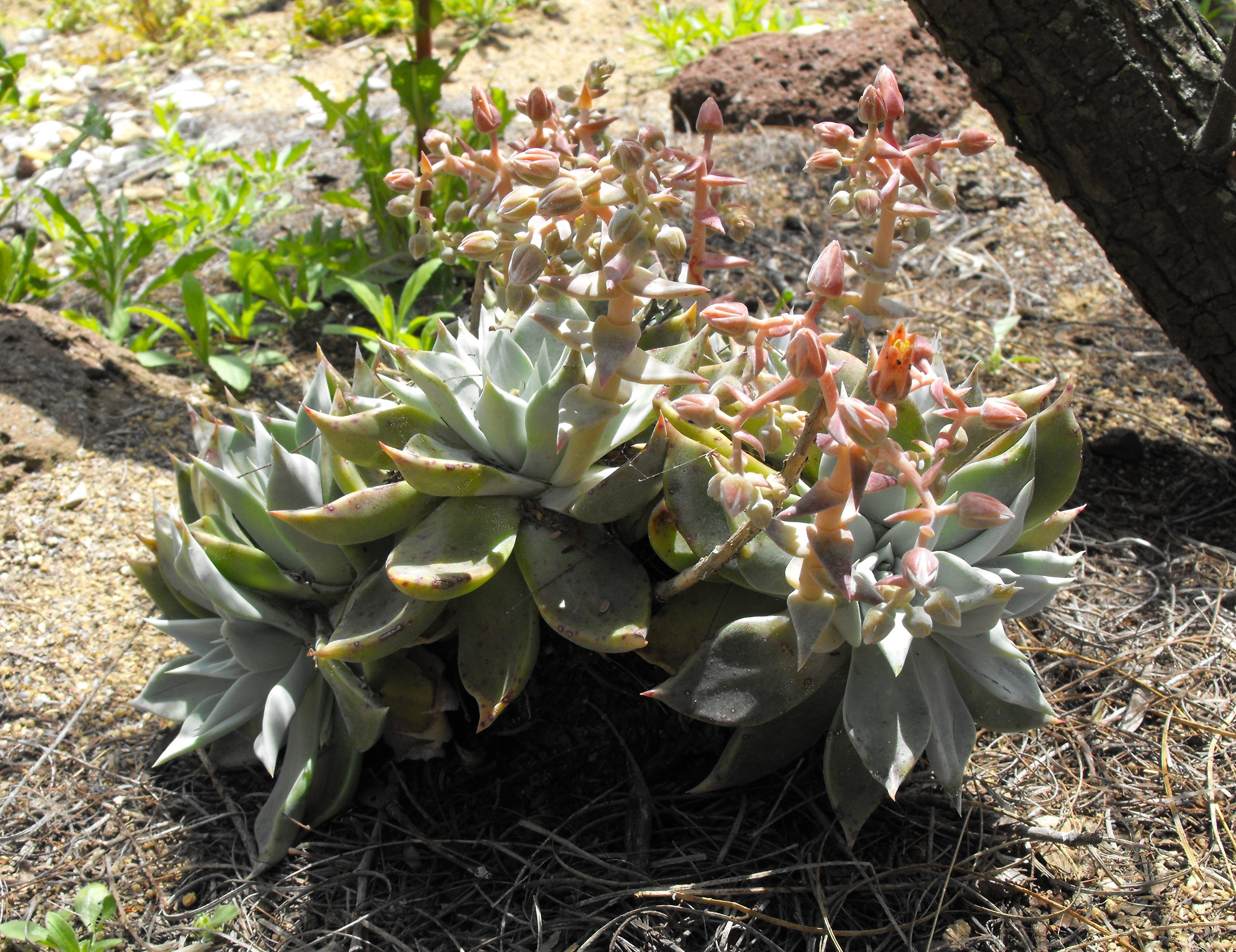
- At San Diego Botanic Garden

Scientific classification
- Kingdom: Plantae
- Clade: Tracheophytes
- Clade: Angiosperms
- Clade: Eudicots
- Order: Saxifragales
- Family: Crassulaceae
- Genus: Dudleya
- Species: D. rubens

Binomial name
- Dudleya rubens (Brandegee) Britton & Rose

Synonyms
- Cotyledon rubens Brandegee; Echeveria rubens (Brandegee) A.Berger

= Dudleya rubens =

Succulent plant species from Baja California Sur

Dudleya rubens is a species of succulent perennial plant in the family Crassulaceae known by the common name as the San Francisco liveforever, native to the mountains of Baja California Sur, Mexico. It is a rosette-forming plant with waxy leaves, characterized by branching stems and dull red to apricot flowers. It is only found above 500 metres (1,600 ft) in the Sierra de San Francisco and the Sierra de la Giganta ranges in Baja California Sur, primarily on north-facing volcanic slopes.

== Description ==
A rosette forming succulent with a similar appearance to Dudleya arizonica, bearing glaucous rosettes with long flowers and erect pedicels. Flowering time is typically from April to May, but this can vary with elevation.

=== Morphology ===
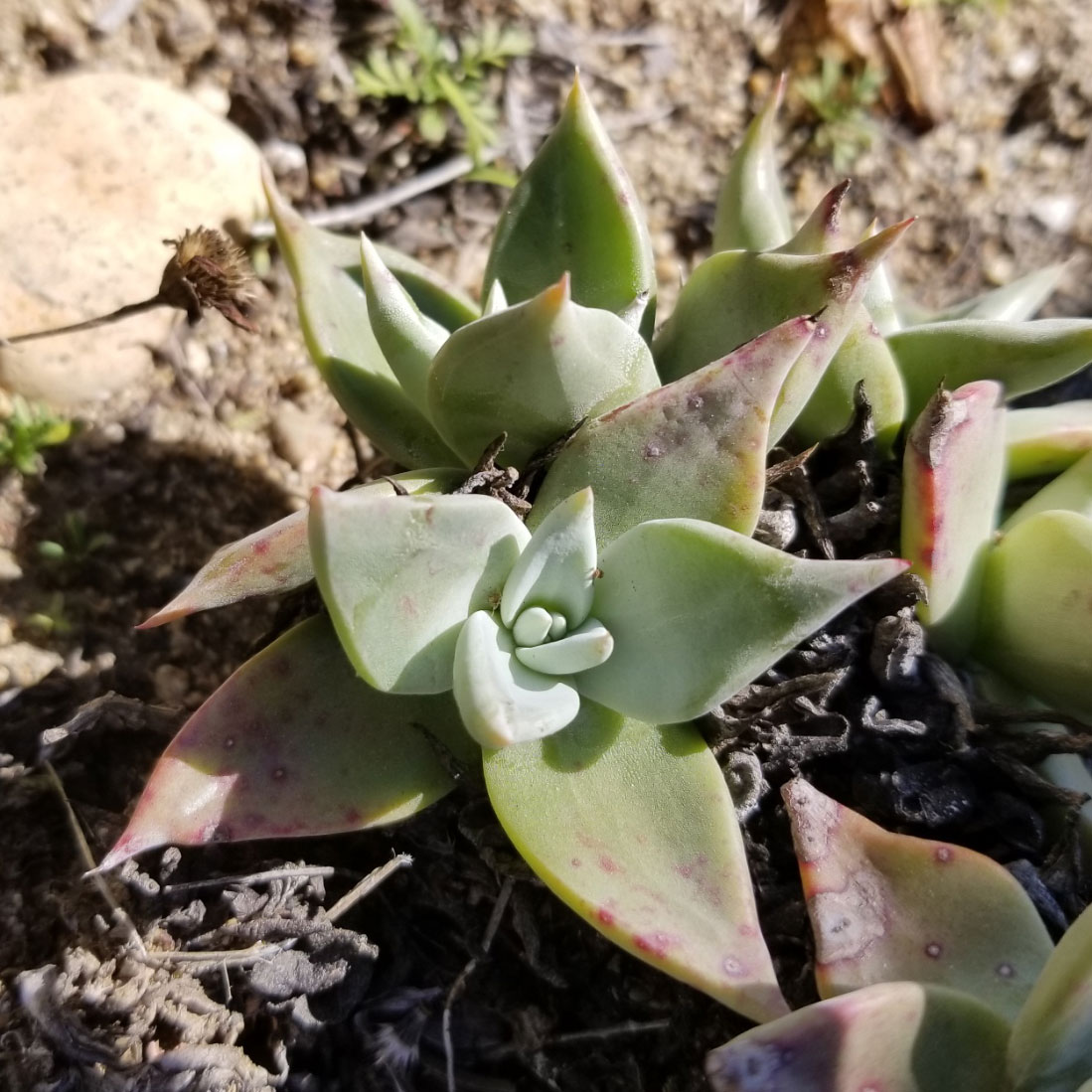
A young rosette of D. rubens

This plant's vegetative leaves emerge from a basal rosette on top of a caudex. The caudex is 10 to 25 mm thick, and 5 to 15 cm long, and is usually solitary or few-branched, although there may be as many as 25 rosettes on top of a branching caudex. The rosettes are 6 to 11 cm in diameter and consist of 10 to 20 farinose leaves. The leaves are shaped oblong to oblanceolate, or rarely obovate, and have a tip that is shaped acute to acuminate or rarely cuspidate tip. The leaves are 3 to 7 cm long, 1 to 2 cm wide, and 3 to 5 mm thick, with the base of the leaves 1 to 2 cm wide. The rosettes are said to bear a resemblance to Dudleya arizonica.

The peduncle is reddish, and is positioned ascending to erect, and measures 7 to 20 cm tall, and 2 to 6 mm thick. 10 to 18 bracts are present on the peduncle, although the lower 2.5 to 5 cm of the peduncle is leafless. The bracts are ascending to horizontal, and textured glaucous to farinose, shaped triangular to lanceolate, with the tips acute to acuminate. The lowermost bracts measure 7 to 15 mm long, and 5 to 8 mm wide, 2 to 3 mm thick. The inflorescence is reddish, consisting of 2 to 3 ascending branches which may bifurcate once, 2 to 12 cm long, with 2 to 12 flowers. The pedicels holding the flowers are positioned ascending to erect, with the lowermost pedicels 4 to 10 mm long.

The calyx is 5 to 8 mm wide, and 4 to 8 mm high, with the tube 1 to 2 mm long. The sepals are shaped triangular to lanceolate, the tips acute to slightly acuminate. The sepals measure 3 to 6 mm long, 2 to 4 mm wide. The diameter of the corolla towards the base is 4.5 to 7 mm wide, and towards the mouth is 4 to 7 mm. The petals are colored reddish to apricot, shaped oblong, erect to slightly spreading at the apex (tips). The petals measure 8 to 15 mm long, and are 1.5 to 3 mm wide, being connate 5 to 7 mm. Within the flower, the epipetalous stamens are slightly longer. The anthers are yellow.

== Taxonomy ==
Chromosome counts and morphology in Dudleya rubens vary based on the location of the specimens. In the Sierra San Francisco, specimens typically have a 34 chromosomes. The second form, 50 miles south, in the Sierra de la Palmas, has 68 chromosomes. Even further south, in the Sierra de La Giganta, some 100 miles south of the previous form, are specimens with narrower leaves with a greenish hue, a larger rosette, and 51 chromosomes. The Sierra de La Giganta form was once split into its own species, known as Dudleya carteri, in honor of the specimen's collector, Annetta Carter.

== Distribution and habitat ==
This species is native to Baja California Sur, being the only Dudleya found above 500 m in the northern part of the state. It is native to the Sierra de San Francisco and the Sierra de Guadalupe in northern Baja California Sur, extending further south as the Sierra de la Giganta south of Loreto. The Sierra de San Francisco form primarily grows on north-facing volcanic cliffs, between 3,000 and 4,000 feet high. The Sierra de la Palmas form grows at 4,000 to 5,000 feet high. Finally, the species growing at the Sierra de La Giganta grows within 6 to 8 miles of the coast, at a height of 2,400 to 3,000 feet.
