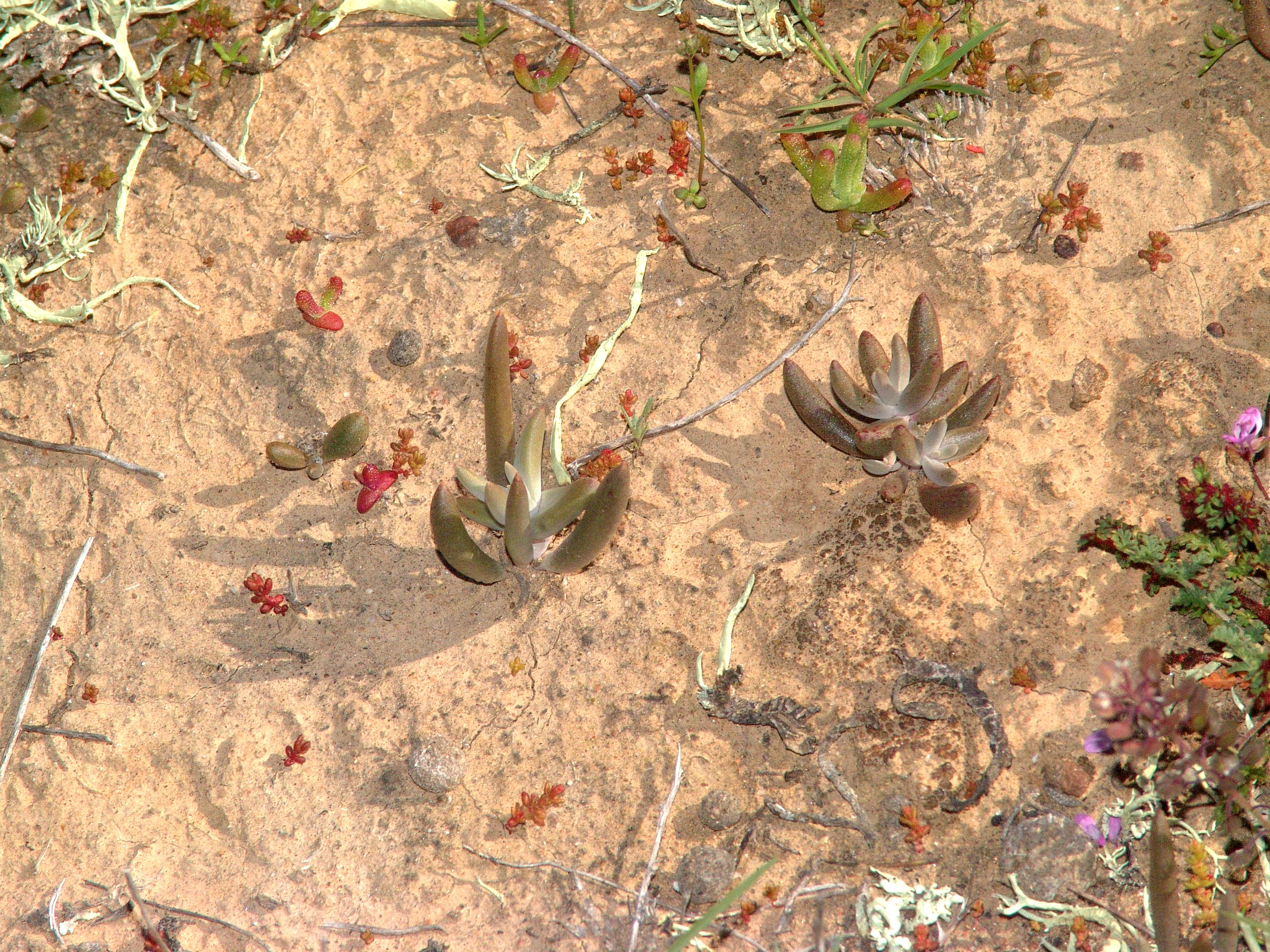

Scientific classification
- Kingdom: Plantae
- Clade: Tracheophytes
- Clade: Angiosperms
- Clade: Eudicots
- Order: Saxifragales
- Family: Crassulaceae
- Genus: Dudleya
- Species: D. hendrixii

Binomial name
- Dudleya hendrixii S.McCabe & Dodero
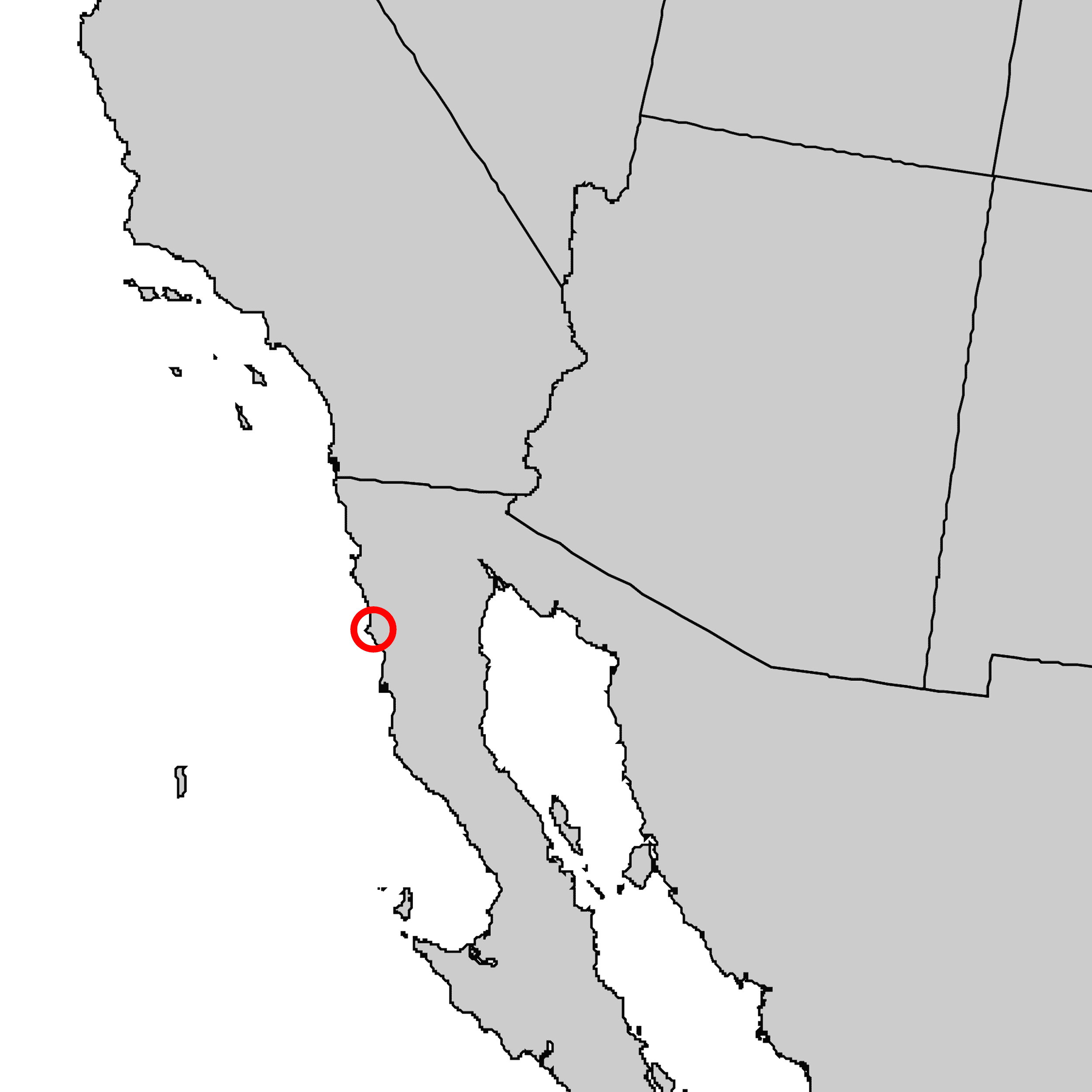
- The location of Punta Colonet, where Dudleya hendrixii grows.

= Dudleya hendrixii =

Species of succulent

Dudleya hendrixii is a species of succulent plant known by the common name Hendrix's liveforever. It is a rare endemic restricted to undisturbed habitat near in the vicinity of Punta Colonet, Baja California, Mexico. The species is a small succulent that grows from an underground stem, producing small flowers in late spring to early summer before becoming summer deciduous and dormant. It was discovered in late 2016 by researchers from San Diego State University and the University of California, Santa Cruz, and is named in honor of the late musician Jimi Hendrix.

== Description ==
Dudleya hendrixii is placed in the Dudleya subgenus Hasseanthus, which consists of species characterized by small drought deciduous leaves, flowers with widely-spreading petals and a tuberous underground stem, similar to a corm. It has been suggested that the corm-like stem and the small drought deciduous leaves are paedomorphic adaptations, as these traits are present in Dudleya seedlings but not usually retained through maturity in the other subgenera.

Among the members of the Hasseanthus, Dudleya hendrixii is distinguished by its combination of white flowers that are absent of odor, a globose-spherical underground stem, and 3 to 5 linear to spindle-shaped leaves borne from narrow petioles. Also notable are the morphological similarities of Dudleya hendrixii to Dudleya attenuata, a non-deciduous species in the subgenus Stylophyllum, as both have narrow, grey-white leaves with acute tips and (in the case of D. attenuata subsp. orcuttii) small white flowers.

=== Morphology ===
Dudleya hendrixii is a low-growing rosette-forming succulent plant, growing to 5 cm (2.0 in) across. It is mostly acaulescent, as the apex of the stem is flush with ground level. The remainder of the stem is a corm-like structure growing underground, with a spherical to slightly longer than wide shape. The stem is unbranching, resulting in solitary rosettes with 3 to 5 leaves.

The leaves are summer deciduous, and usually have a light gray glaucescent appearance. The leaves are shaped linear to fusiform, and may be straight or curved, terminated by an acuminate to attenuate tip. The petioles are narrow and upright. The leaves are oriented upright, their distal ends usually far apart, with one leaf usually curving over the apex of the plant.

Plants usually produce 2 to 4 inflorescences. The peduncles grow from the stem and are 1–2 mm (0.039–0.079 in) thick, and grow to create an inflorescence that measures 10–20 cm (3.9–7.9 in) tall. The peduncle is lined with succulent bracts, the lower ones measuring 4–10 mm (0.16–0.39 in) long by 3–7 mm (0.12–0.28 in) wide with an attenuate tip. The lowermost two bracts are placed nearly opposite of each other, while the subsequent bracts above are mostly alternate. Several terminal branches 1–2.5 cm (0.39–0.98 in) bear the flowers.

Pedicels to 1 mm (0.039 in) long bear the flowers. The calyx is about 3 mm (0.12 in) long, with red-brown sepals, and is more or less glaucous, becoming especially so towards the base. The petals are pink in bud, and in maturity are white with pink on their lower surface, and are striped with red along their keel. The petals are about 8 mm (0.31 in) long by 3 mm (0.12 in) wide, and are united for around 1 mm (0.039 in) or less of their length. The anthers have red tips prior to dehiscence and produce yellow pollen. The carpels are spreading and becoming widely spreading as they mature into follicles.

== Taxonomy ==
=== Etymology ===
The specific epithet of the species, hendrixii, is named in honor of musician Jimi Hendrix, as Mark Dodero, the former graduate student from SDSU who is credited with discovering the plant, was listening to Hendrix's "Voodoo Child" at the moment he found the plant.

== Ecology ==
Because of its small habitat, the plant is under threat of extinction from grazing and development.

== See also ==
- Dudleya brevifolia
- Dudleya multicaulis
- List of organisms named after famous people (born 1925–1949)
