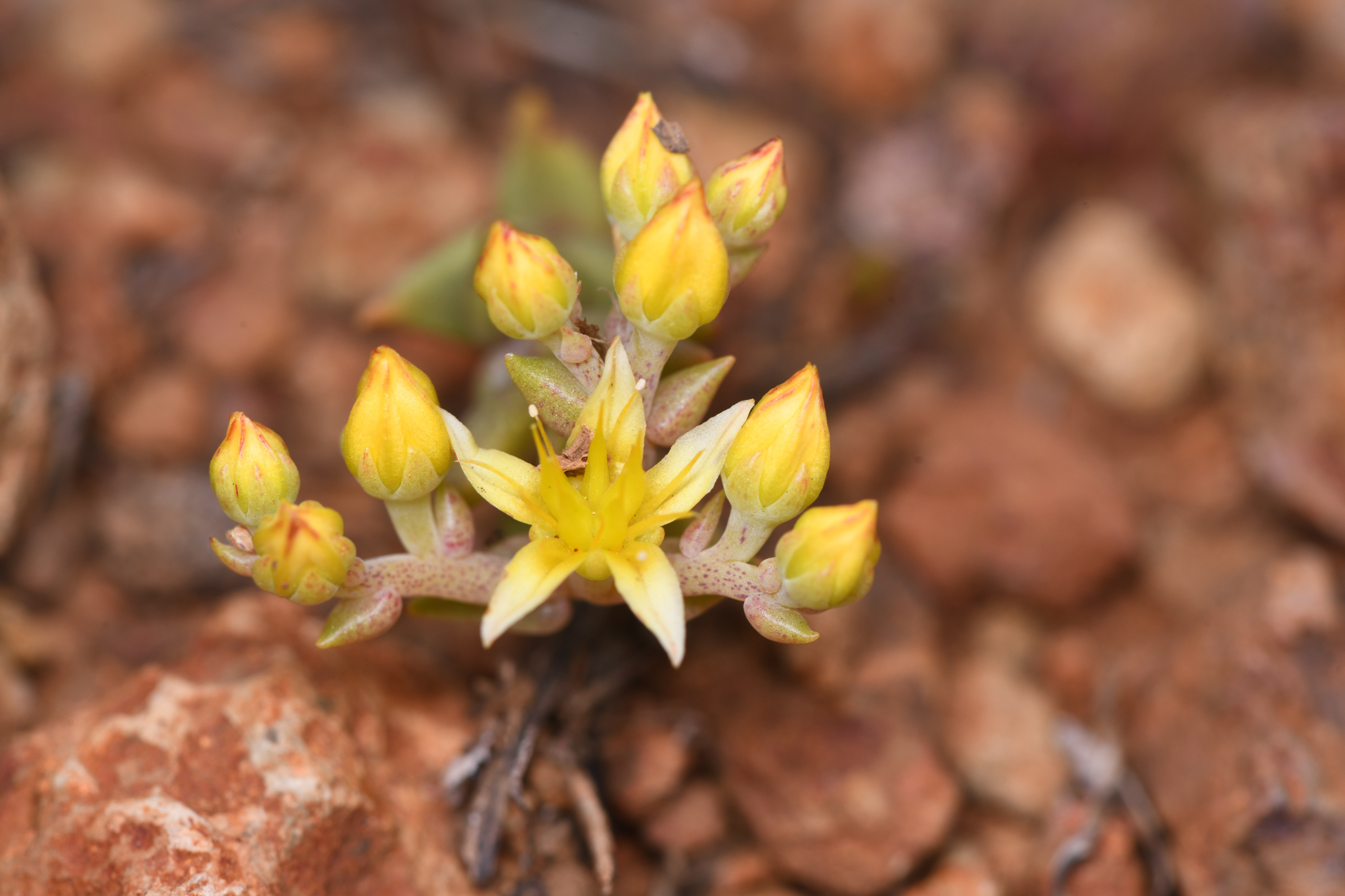
- In flower

Conservation status
- Imperiled (NatureServe)

Scientific classification
- Kingdom: Plantae
- Clade: Tracheophytes
- Clade: Angiosperms
- Clade: Eudicots
- Order: Saxifragales
- Family: Crassulaceae
- Genus: Dudleya
- Species: D. variegata

Binomial name
- Dudleya variegata (S.Wats.) Moran

Synonyms
- List: Hasseanthus variegatus Rose; Hasseanthus variegatus var. blochmanae (Eastw.) Jeps.; Hasseanthus variegatus var. elongatus I.M.Johnst.; Sedum variegatum S.Watson

= Dudleya variegata =

Variegated dudleya

Species of succulent

Dudleya variegata is a deciduous succulent plant in the family Crassulaceae known by the common names variegated liveforever, variegated dudleya or rarely San Diego Hasseanthus. A cryptic plant that survives part of the year dormant underground from starch reserves in a corm, after sufficient rainfall, leaves will emerge, soon giving way to small inflorescences with yellow star-shaped flowers. It is native to Baja California and adjacent San Diego County in California, where it grows in several habitat types, including chaparral and vernal pools.

== Description ==
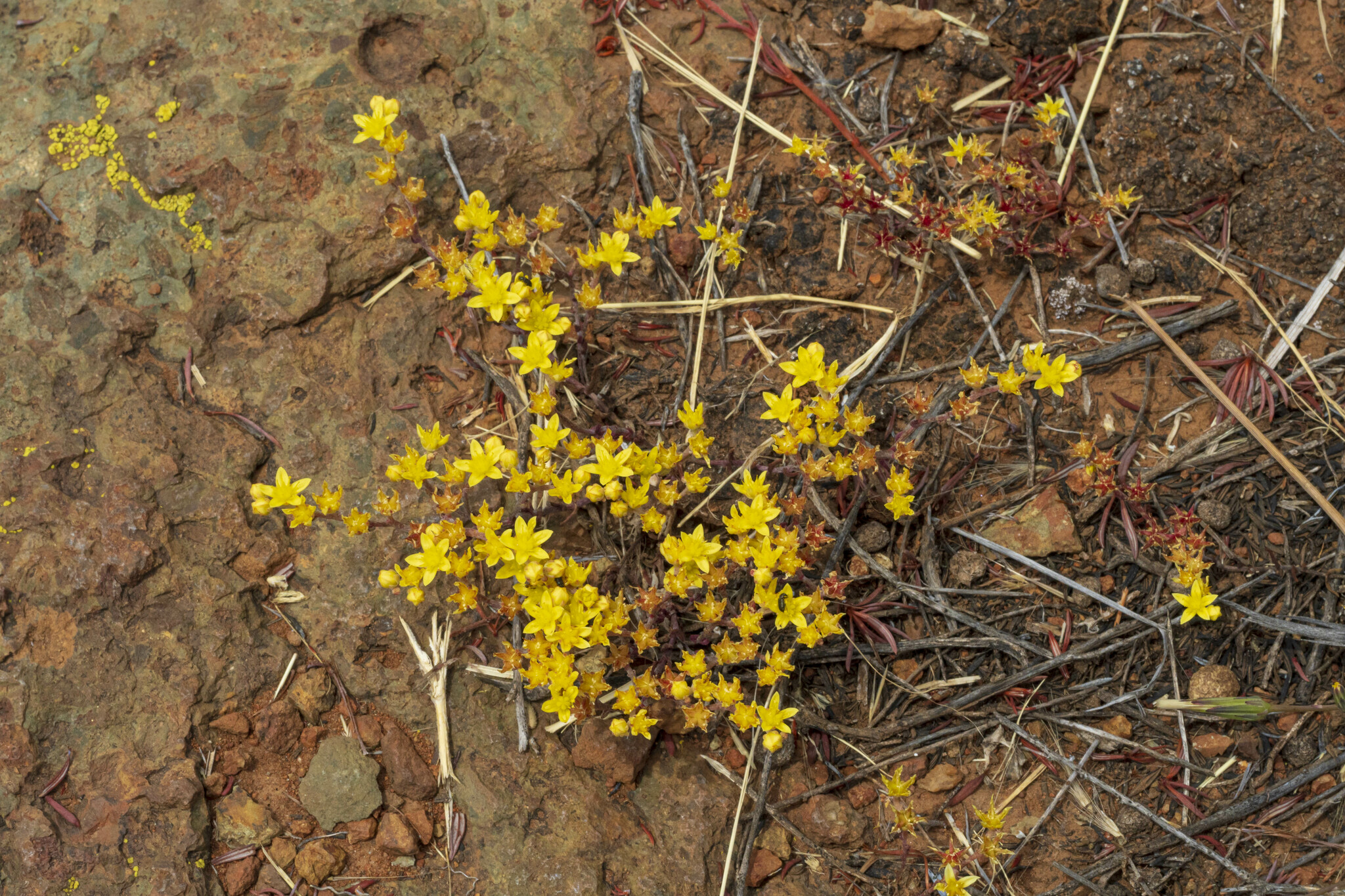
Numerous Dudleya variegata flowering

Although many members of the genus Dudleya are rosette-forming plants with evergreen leaves, this species belongs to the subgenus Hasseanthus, which has diverged into geophytic plants. Species within this subgenus are characterized by small, globose and deciduous leaves similar in appearance and size to the juvenile leaves of plants outside of the subgenus. The stem has evolved into a corm-like unit buried under the surface of the soil, and plants utilize starch reserves within the tuberous root to survive the dry season. The reduced leaves and corm-like caudex are probably paedomorphic adaptations as most Dudleya seedlings have a tuberous caudex and small, drought-deciduous leaves.

This plant has distinctive, often paddle or spoon-shaped leaves with long petioles. The inflorescences contain spreading bright yellow flowers. The stem is an oblong-shaped corm-like structure. Plants can survive the summer without any water, until moisture returns in mid-October, with the leaves finally re-emerging in November.

=== Morphology ===
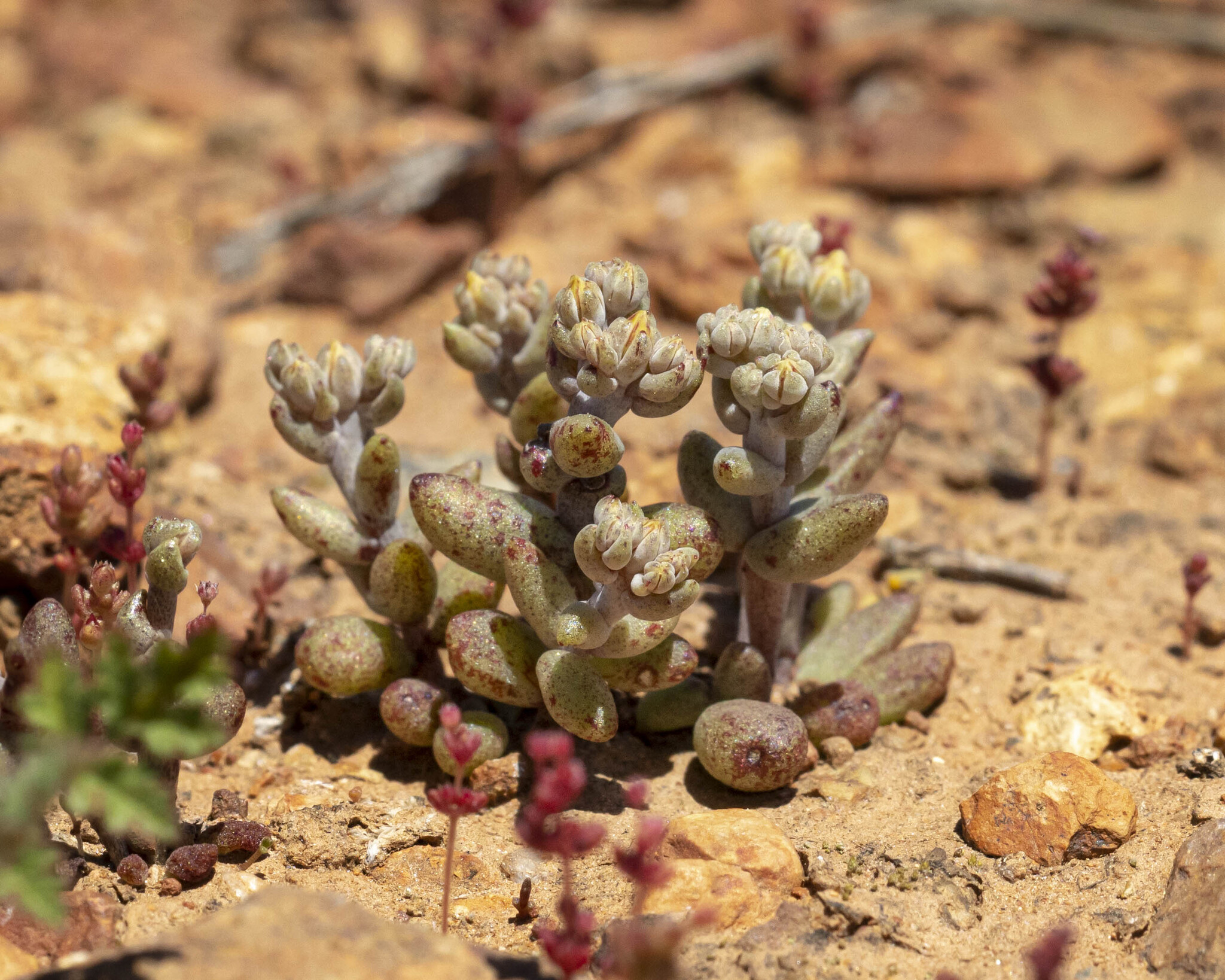
Dudleya variegata with its vegetative leaves and developing inflorescences

Plants of this species form 1 to 3 rosettes from the top of the subterranean stem, with each cluster of leaves around 2–6 cm (0.79–2.36 in) wide. The buried stem itself is 1–3 cm (0.39–1.18 in) long, and 3–15 mm (0.12–0.59 in) wide, with a more or less spherical to oblong shape. The leaves are deciduous in summer, and are generally not glaucous, with an oblanceolate or spoon shape. The leaves measure 1–7 cm (0.39–2.76 in) long by 0.5–11 mm (0.020–0.433 in), with the base generally 1–3 mm (0.039–0.118 in) wide, the tip of the leaf shaped acute to obtuse.

The peduncle is 5–20 cm (2.0–7.9 in) tall and 0.5–2 mm (0.020–0.079 in) wide, with 2 to 3 simple, ascending branches. The branches are 2–15 cm (0.79–5.91 in) long, and have 3 to 11 flowers. The flowers are suspended on pedicels 0.5–3 mm (0.020–0.118 in) long. The sepals of the flower are 2–3.5 mm (0.079–0.138 in) long, and shaped deltate-ovate. The petals are 5–8 mm (0.20–0.31 in) long by 2–3.5 mm (0.079–0.138 in) wide, and shaped elliptic. The petals are bright yellow, and have an acute tip. The fruit is spreading, inheriting the characteristic of the flowers.

Plants flower from April to June. Chromosome number is 2n = 34 (n = 17).

== Taxonomy ==
=== Taxonomic history ===
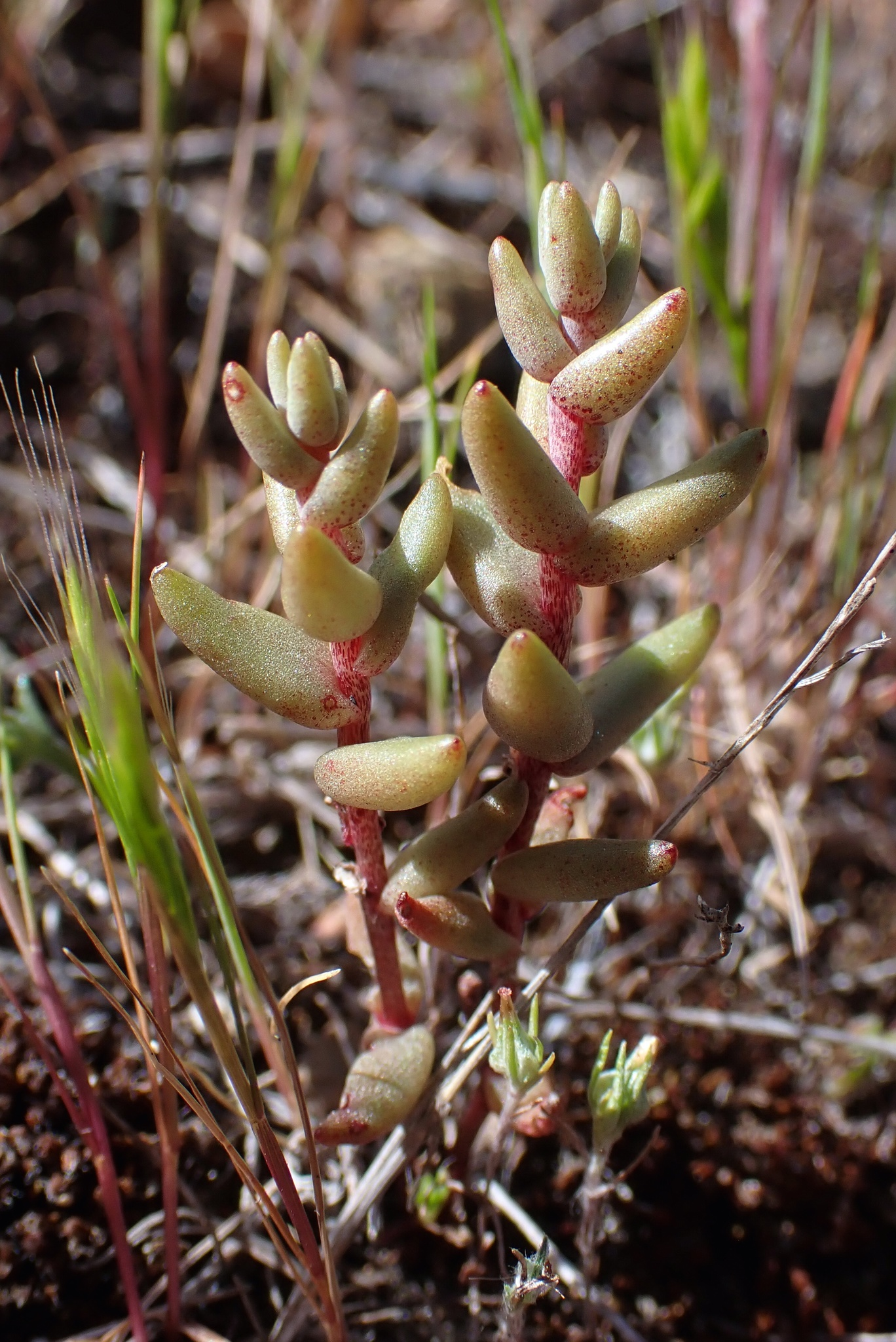
The developing inflorescences

This species was first named by botanist Sereno Watson as Sedum variegatum in 1876, based on collections by Daniel Cleveland in San Diego. In 1903, Joseph Nelson Rose and Nathaniel Lord Britton revised the North American Crassulaceae, and placed this taxon as the type species of a new genus, Hasseanthus, and renamed it Hasseanthus variegatus.

In 1945, it was believed that Dudleya multicaulis, at the time called Hasseanthus elongatus, occurred in the Sweetwater River Canyon, at Dehesa, San Diego County. Botanist Reid Moran studied the population and found that, although containing some morphological differences, they were more well-suited to be Hasseanthus variegatus. Plants at this location flower three to four weeks later than typical D. variegata populations elsewhere, and also differ in their greater size and yellower foliage.

In 1953, Reid Moran transferred the genus Hasseanthus as a subgenus of Dudleya on the basis of cytotaxonomic work with Dr. Charles H. Uhl, thus creating the current name.

In the southern part of its range, particularly near Rosarito Beach and Rancho Cuevas in the north of Baja California, plants similar to this species are found that also combine characteristics of Dudleya blochmaniae. They have relatively thick rosette leaves and a habitat closer to D. blochmaniae, but present with yellow odorless flowers.

=== Phylogeny ===
Dudleya variegata is usually grouped into the subgenus Hasseanthus, a taxonomic rank characterized by diminutive size, deciduous leaves and underground corms. This would have placed it along with 3 other Hasseanthus taxa native to San Diego County, Dudleya blochmaniae, Dudleya brevifolia, and Dudleya multicaulis.

A phylogenetic study from 2013 suggests that the subgenus Hasseanthus is not well-supported by molecular analysis, instead tentatively placing this in a clade which includes the majority of Hasseanthus albeit with the exception of D. multicaulis and the inclusion of D. verityi.

=== Hybrids ===
This species is known to hybridize with other members of the genus. These include:

- × Dudleya attenuata subsp. attenuata – Found in extreme north-western Baja California near Tijuana.
- × Dudleya brevifolia – Hybrids possess intermediate traits, like cream colored flowers. Only identified in the 1970s. Occurred north of Eastgate Mall road in La Jolla and the Sorrento Valley.

== Distribution and habitat ==
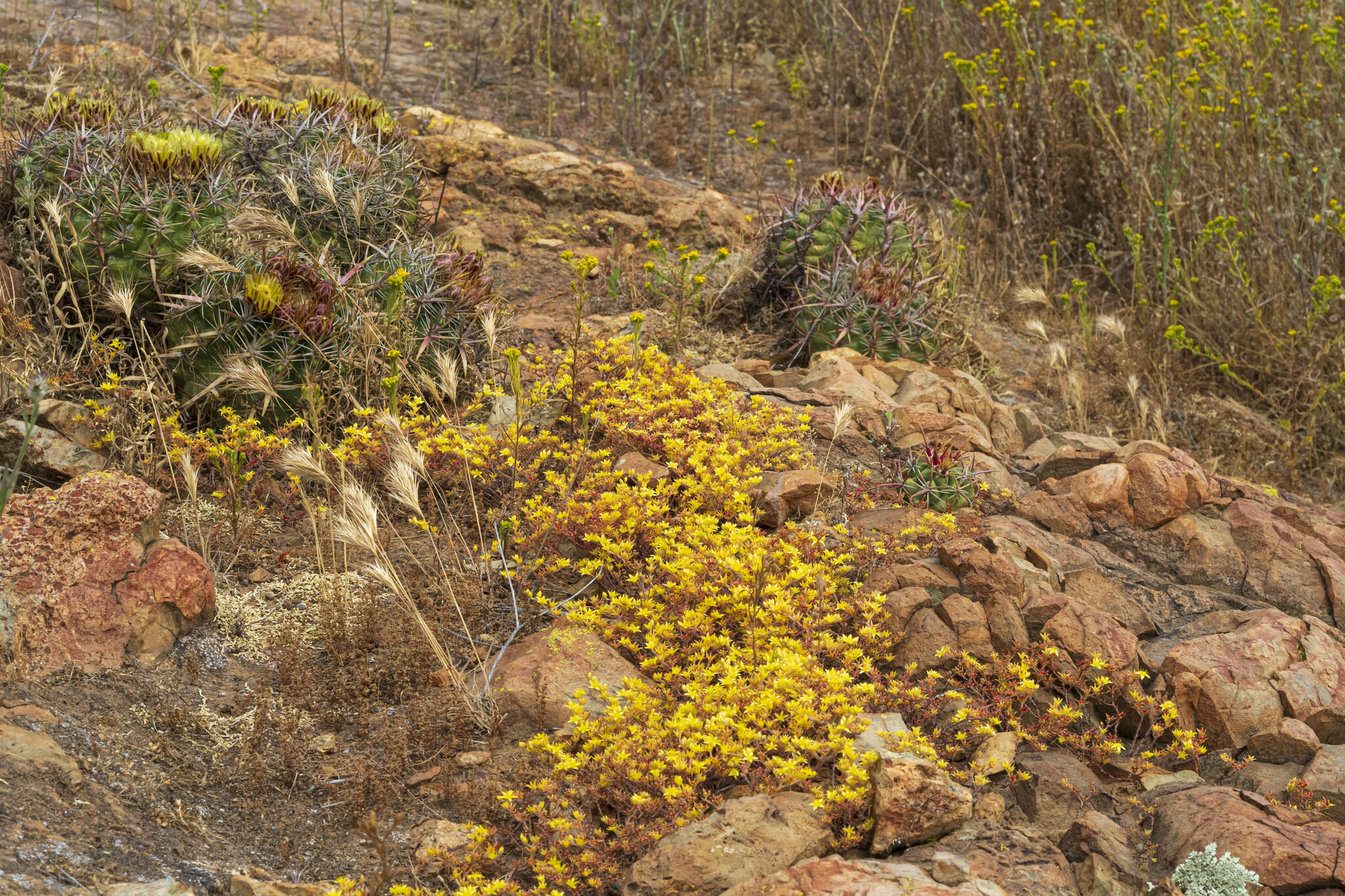
Dudleya variegata with Ferocactus viridescens var. viridescens

The plant is endemic to an area roughly 80 km long, from San Diego County down into northwestern Baja California, from Tijuana to Ensenada. It occurs in relatively small, disjunct populations from near Black Mountain Ranch in San Diego County to Ensenada. Localities in San Diego County that have or had populations include Black Mountain, Kearney Mesa, Dictionary Hill, San Miguel Mountain, El Cajon, La Mesa, Fletcher Hills, Paradise Hills, Rice Canyon, Dehesa, Otay Mountain, Imperial Beach, and the border near the Otay Crossing. There is also an occurrence at the Silver Strand Training Complex, between Imperial Beach and Silver Strand State Beach.

This species is found typically on dry hillsides and mesas, in foothills and coastal regions usually below 300 m (980 ft). It can be found in the open clearings of chamise, sage scrub or scrub oak brush, on clay lenses and vernal pools. Associates include Ferocactus viridescens, Selaginella cinerascens, and Selaginella bigelovii.

== Conservation ==
Severe reversals in the population of the variegated dudleya have been the result of continued urban expansion in the United States and Mexico. The rush to develop industrial parks and suburbs along the Mexican-American border near Otay Mesa has led to extensive devastation of major populations and colonies of the plant. Federal tax benefits for these industrial parks encouraged widespread grading on the mesa, eliminating populations of the inconspicuous plant. Recreational activity is also detrimental to the species.

== See also ==
- Dudleya multicaulis – another deciduous Dudleya with yellow flowers
- Hooveria parviflora – another bulbous plant that is native to the same ecoregion
- Reid Moran
