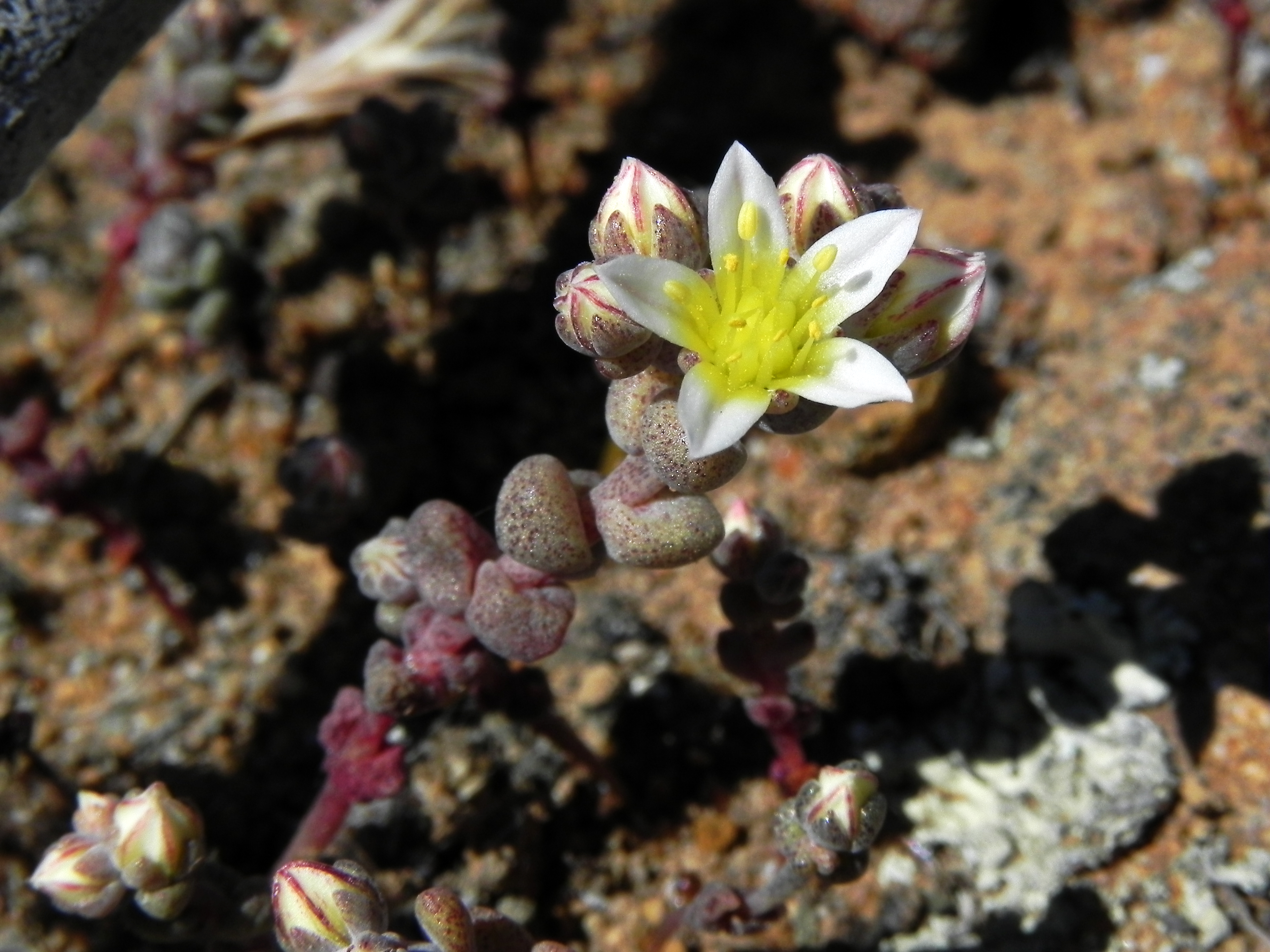
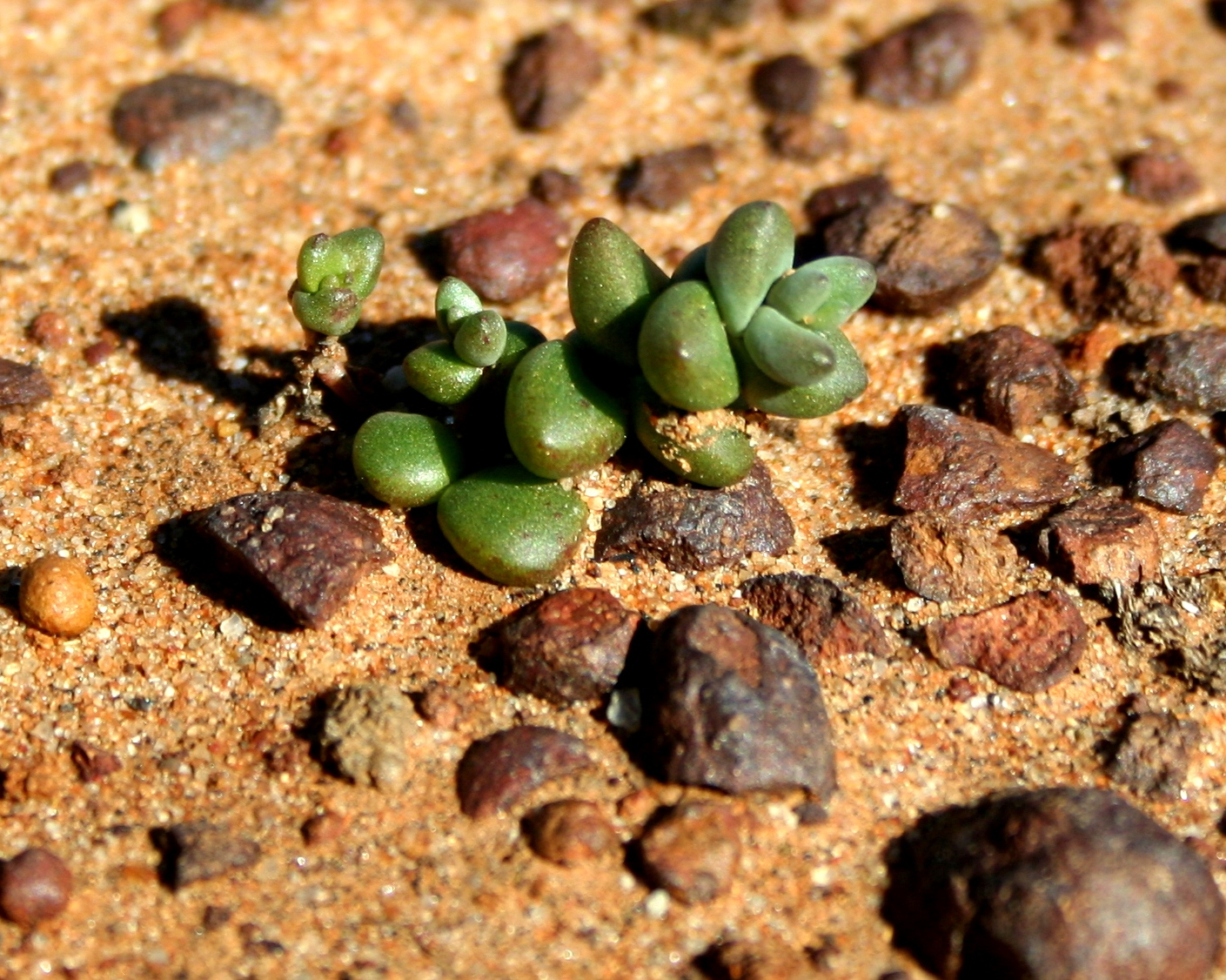
- Flowering (top) and developing inflorescence (bottom)

Conservation status
- Critically Imperiled (NatureServe)

Scientific classification
- Kingdom: Plantae
- Clade: Embryophytes
- Clade: Tracheophytes
- Clade: Spermatophytes
- Clade: Angiosperms
- Clade: Eudicots
- Order: Saxifragales
- Family: Crassulaceae
- Genus: Dudleya
- Species: D. brevifolia

Binomial name
- Dudleya brevifolia (Moran) Moran
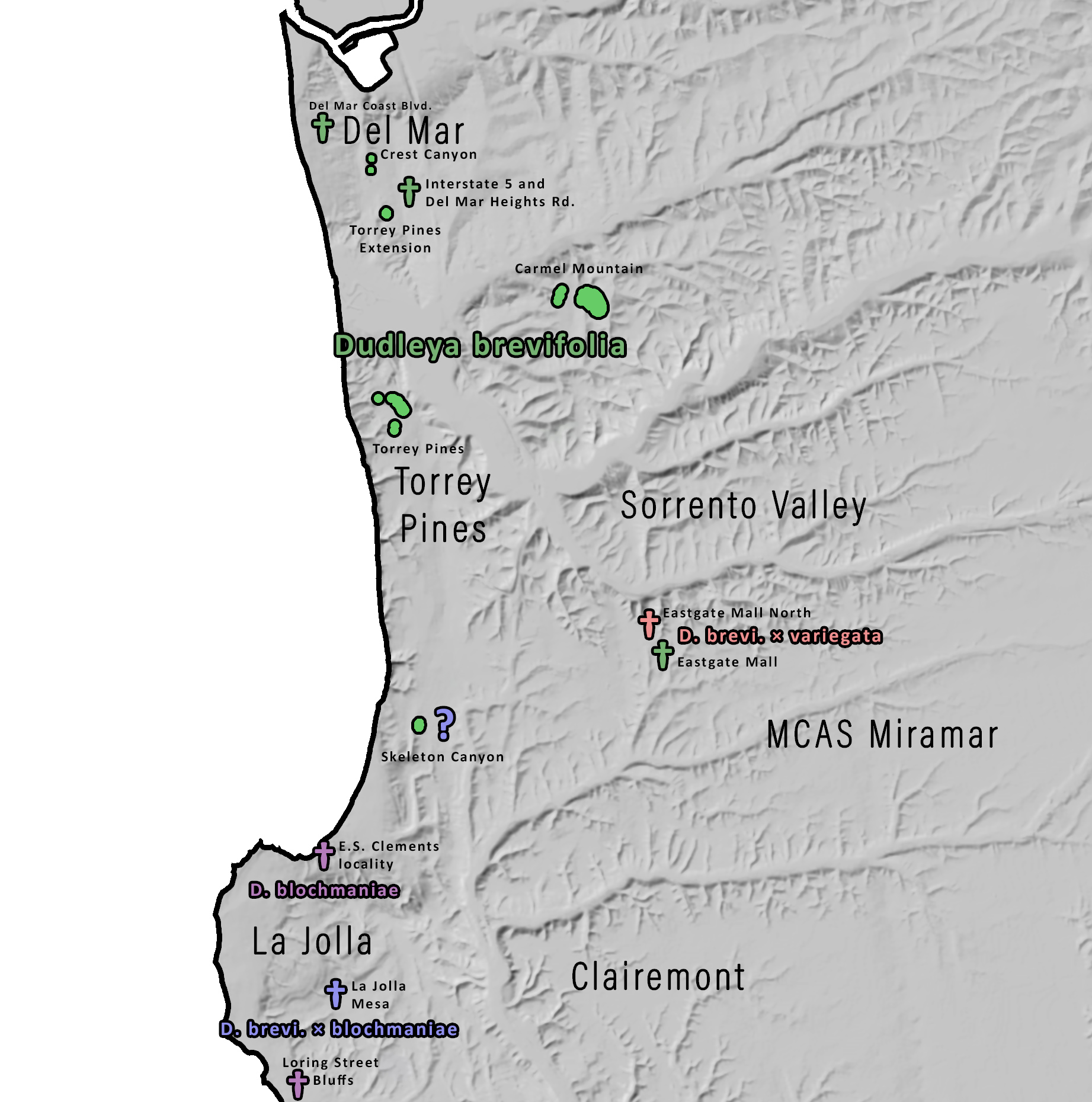
- Natural range of Dudleya brevifolia green - D. brevifolia † red - D. brevifolia × D. variegata † blue - Introgressive populations with D. blochmaniae ssp. blochmaniae † purple - D. blochmaniae ssp. blochmaniae Daggers (†) represent extirpated populations. Populations on the map are given a name based on locality or collector.

Synonyms
- Dudleya blochmaniae subsp. brevifolia Moran

= Dudleya brevifolia =

Species of succulent plant from California

Dudleya brevifolia, is a rare succulent plant known by the common name short-leaved liveforever, short-leaved dudleya or rarely the Del Mar Hasseanthus. It is an edaphic endemic that only grows on Lindavista formation marine terraces, on surfaces with ironstone nodules. The leaves are deciduous, and disappear after the inflorescence develops. The small white flowers are star-shaped with a yellow center. After flowering, any above ground trace of the plant will disappear, and it survives under the earth with a starch-rich subterranean caudex. Dudleya brevifolia is only found on coastal mesas along a small strip of coast in San Diego County, California.

It was formerly a subspecies of the similar Dudleya blochmaniae, and was not recognized as a distinct species because both plants grew and hybridized together. However, the habitats with the intermediate populations were razed for residential development, and with these populations destroyed, Dudleya blochmaniae subsp. brevifolia was elevated to species status as Dudleya brevifolia. Populations continued to be extirpated until the plant was protected. Currently, Dudleya brevifolia is only found in five locations in the world, in an area roughly 8 square miles (21 square kilometres) centered around Torrey Pines State Natural Reserve. It is of conservation concern, as the remaining populations have become fragmented and are threatened by continued disturbance and declining populations at some sites.

== Description ==
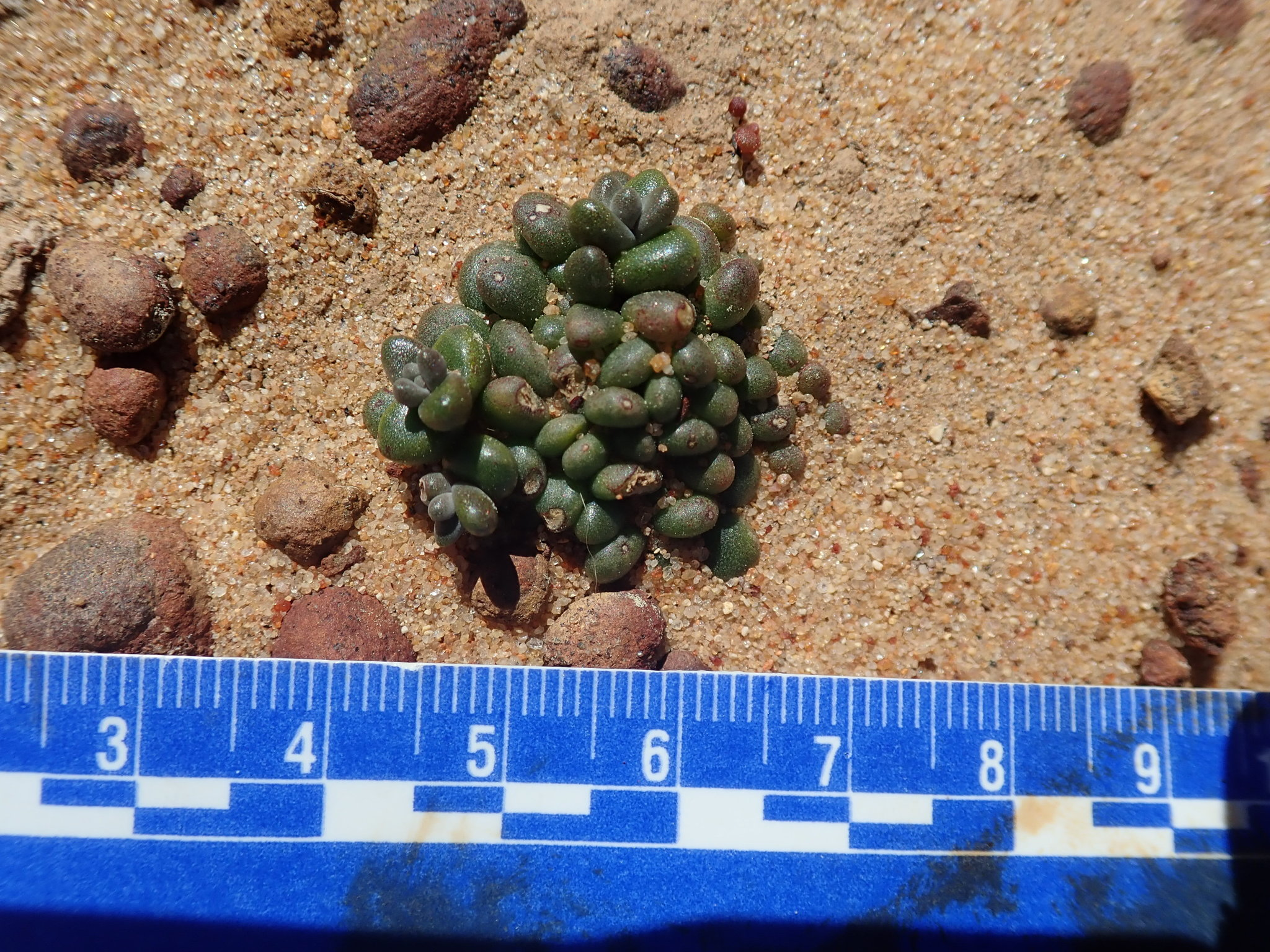
In comparison with a ruler, demonstrating the minuscule size of this succulent

This species is unique as the smallest member of the Dudleya. It is characterized by the ultimate leaf reduction in the genus, having the smallest and most divergent leaf type, which are often almost buried in the soil and connected to the stem by long petioles. This species is neotenous, with the adult leaves essentially remaining unchanged from the juvenile leaves.

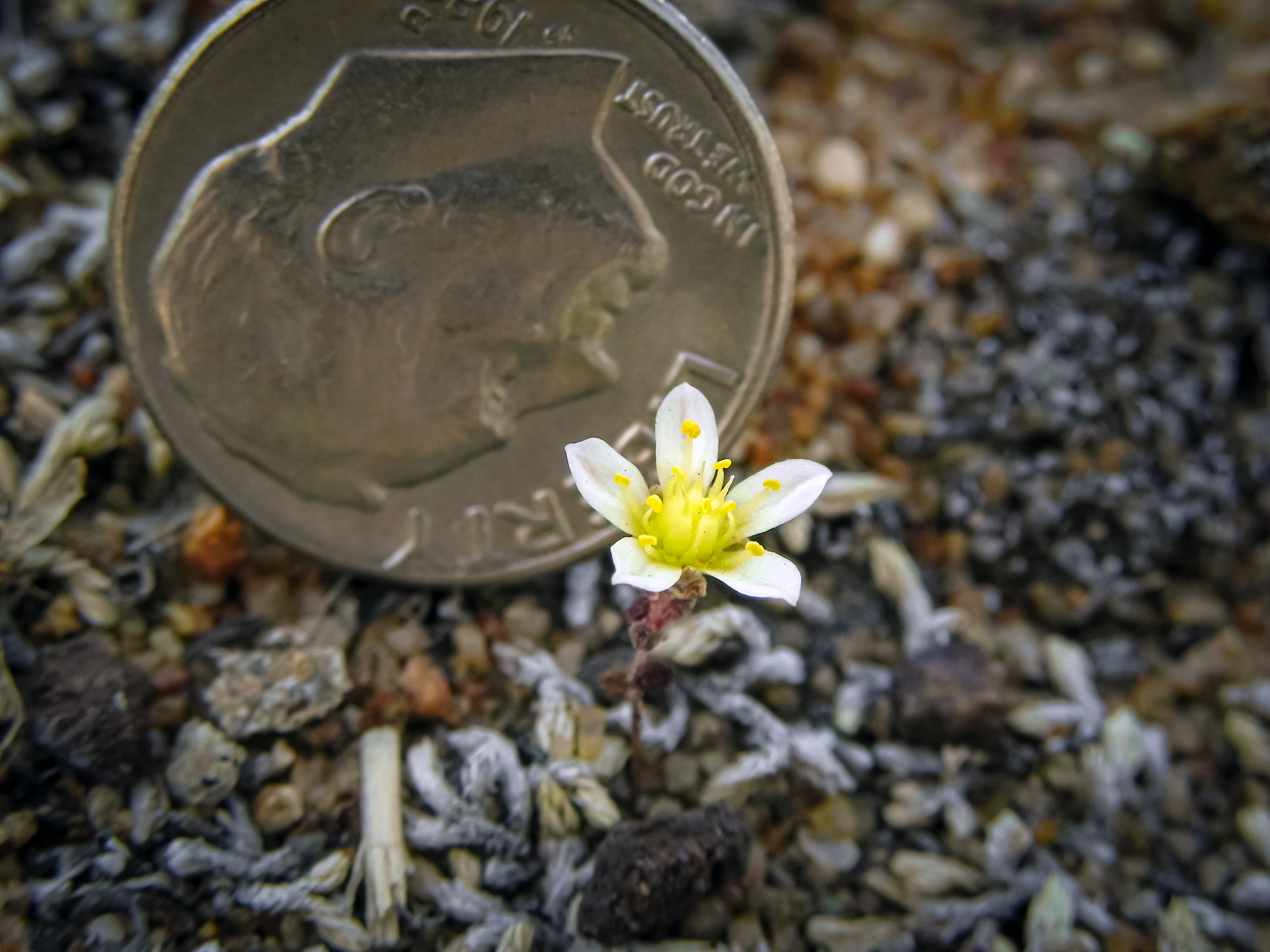
A plant with a sole flower compared to a dime

The leaves are deciduous, and expire towards the summer months. The flowering period usually begins as early as April, and continues through June, with seeds being set in June and July. The populations at Carmel Mountain Preserve tend to flower earlier than those near the coast.

=== Morphology ===
While the majority of species of Dudleya tend to have woody, above-ground stems, in this species the stem has been reduced to a subterranean, corm-like structure. This corm is elongate, and measures 1.5–3.5 cm (0.59–1.38 in) long by 1–6 mm (0.039–0.236 in). Emerging from the corm are the rosettes of basal leaves, with usually one rosette of leaves per plant, but sometimes increasing to up to three. The rosettes measure 0.5–4 cm (0.20–1.57 in) wide. There are 5 to 15 basal leaves, more or less spheric to spoon-shaped distally, which are usually buried in the soil except for the top surface of each leaf blade. The leaves measure 0.7–1.5 cm (0.28–0.59 in) long by 2–7 mm (0.079–0.276 in) wide and 2–4 mm (0.079–0.157 in) thick. The leaves have a long, narrow petiole connecting them to the stem.

The peduncle is 2–11 cm (0.79–4.33 in) tall by 0.5–1 mm (0.020–0.039 in). The peduncle is covered in 10 to 20 bracts. The bracts are shaped triangular-ovate to sub-orbiculate (nearly circular) or reniform (kidney-shaped). The bracts measure 0.2–1 cm (0.079–0.394 in) long by 2.5–8 mm (0.098–0.315 in) wide and 2–6 mm (0.079–0.236 in) thick, with the tip of bracts obtuse. The lower bracts are less than 1.5 × longer than they are wide. The terminal branches (cincinni) on the inflorescence, of which there are typically very few, measure 1–4 cm (0.39–1.57 in) long and have 3 to 10 flowers.

The flowers are white and star-shaped, with a yellow center. The petals are connate 0.7 mm (0.028 in), and spread from near the middle. They are white, colored pinkish on the keel, turning yellow towards the center, and are also often lined with red. The shape of the petals is elliptic, and they measure 5–8.5 mm (0.20–0.33 in) long by 2–3.5 mm (0.079–0.138 in) wide, with the apex subobtuse. The entire corolla measures 8–15 mm (0.31–0.59 in) in diameter. The flowers tend to have a musky-sweet odor.

== Taxonomy ==
=== Taxonomic history ===
The plant was first collected by F. W. Peirson at Torrey Pines in 1922. Willis L. Jepson, in line with the common scientific view at the time, regarded the plant as a new species of Sedum. Specimens later discovered in the area were unable to be distinguished from Hasseanthus blochmaniae (Blochman's dudleya).

The genus Hasseanthus, now moved into a subgenus of Dudleya, includes plants characterized by a geophytic habit. A 1950 treatment of the plant by Reid Moran would then place it under the subspecies brevifolia of H. blochmaniae, noting some significant morphological differences. The genus Hasseanthus would later become a subgenera of Dudleya.

By 1975, Moran's assessment of the species in the journal Baileya was more grim. Lamenting the "progress of civilization," he reconsidered it as a species in its own right, noting that the destruction of the introgressive populations that graded into Blochman's dudleya made these plants distinct enough to be deemed a species.

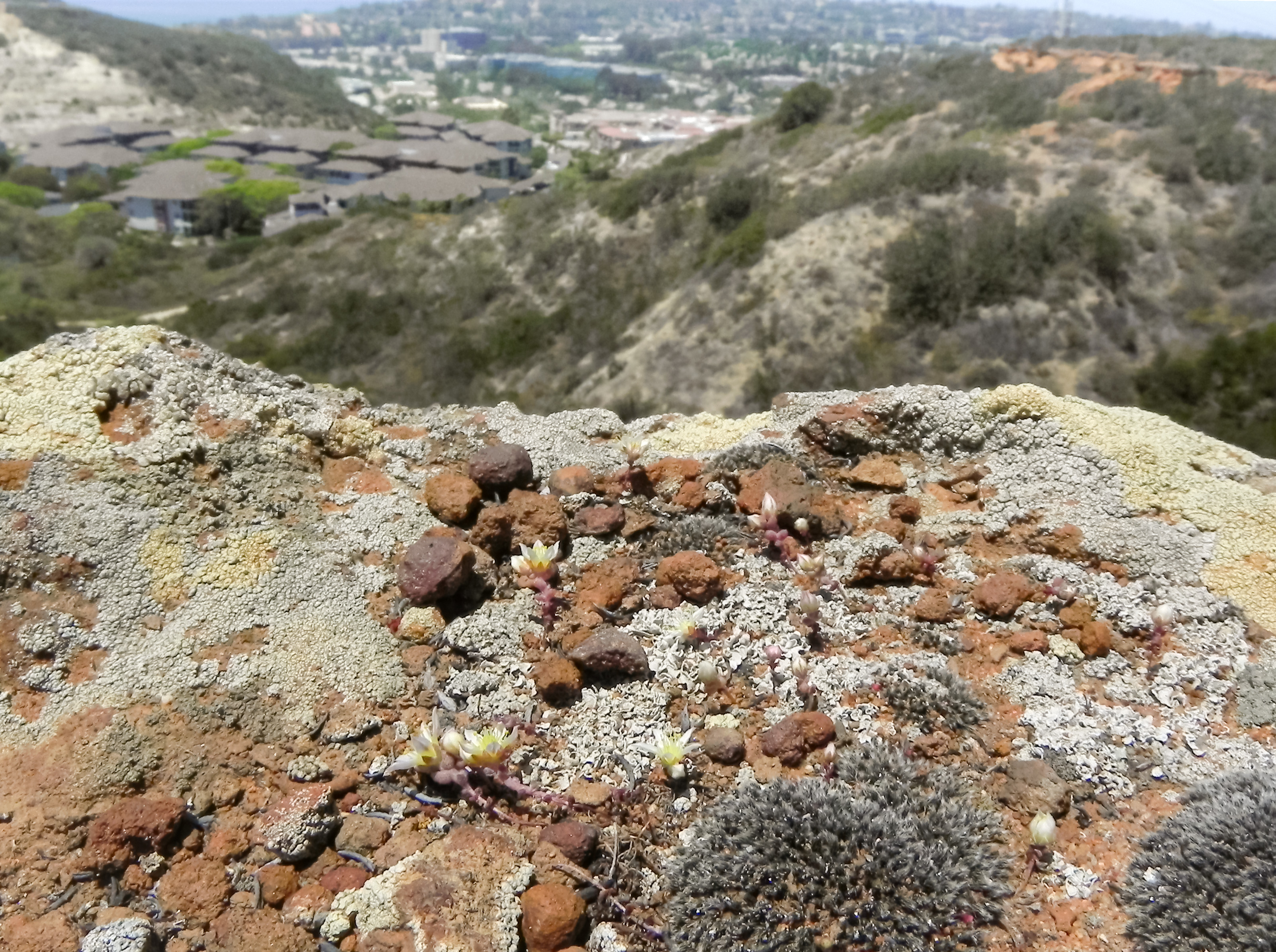
With lichen, moss, and ironstone concretions, overlooking the Carmel Valley.

=== Hybridization ===
Two species of deciduous Dudleya graded into the population of Dudleya brevifolia. Hybrids with Dudleya edulis have also been reported.

==== D. brevifolia × blochmaniae ====
One population approached Dudleya blochmaniae at a mesa east of La Jolla. The plants flowered three to four weeks earlier than the other populations of D. brevifolia, and had a different growth habit, being primarily found in depressions on the mesa. Compared to brevifolia, their rosettes and cauline leaves were slightly longer and narrower. The basal leaves and corms approached brevifolia. Moran noted how it was difficult to distinguish brevifolia from blochmaniae until the advent of land development in the area extirpated the populations that transitioned between the two.

==== D. brevifolia × variegata ====
The plant was also known to grade into Dudleya variegata abundantly at a vernal pool-like depression north of Eastgate Mall road and west of the I-805 near Miramar and the Sorrento Valley. The location is now an office park. The hybrids possessed intermediate traits.

== Distribution and habitat ==
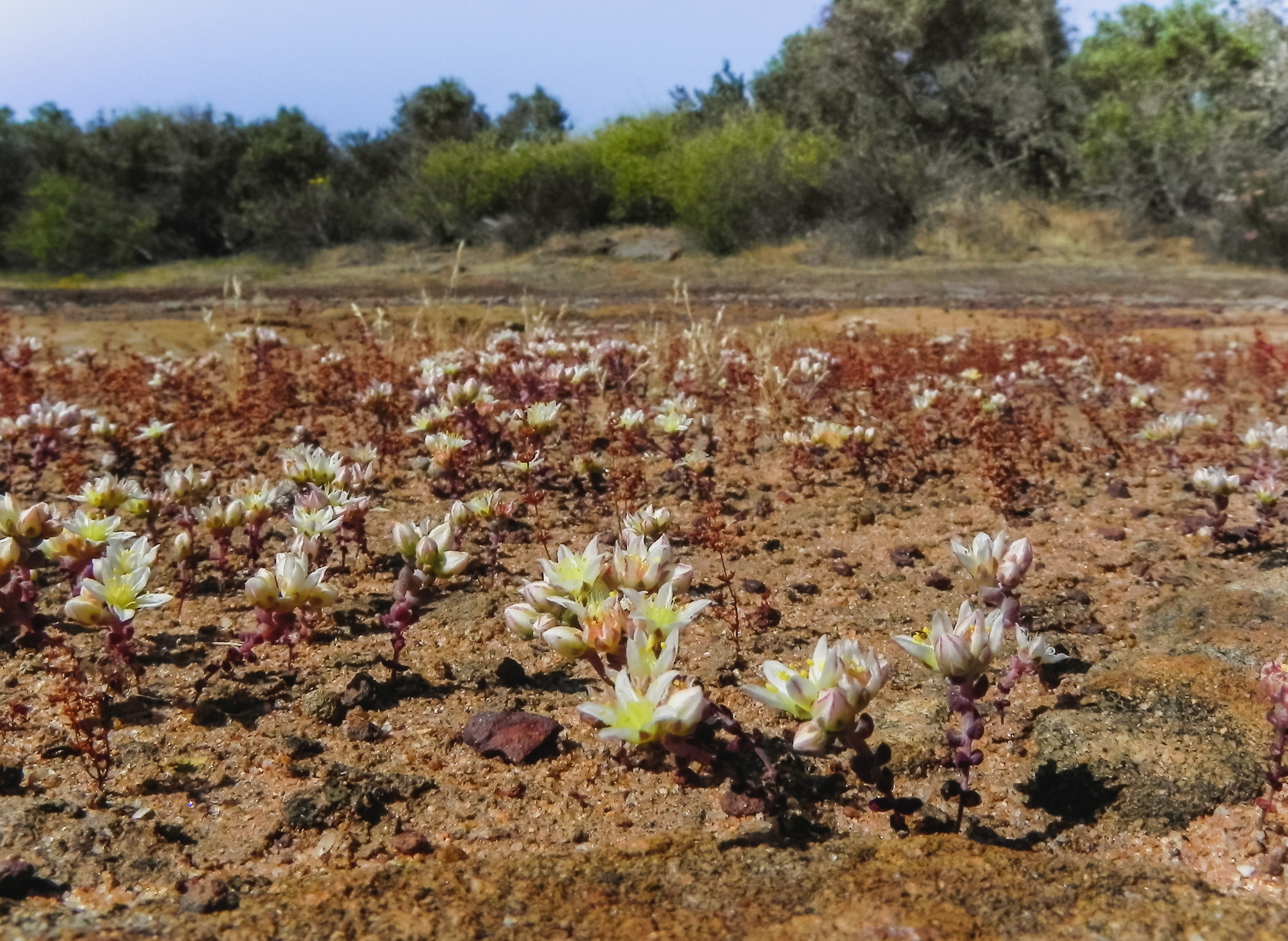
Numerous plants, Carmel Mountain, San Diego.

The plant is endemic to coastal sage scrub habitats in southern California, found only in an extremely limited range within southwestern San Diego County. It is found at Torrey Pines State Natural Reserve in the La Jolla neighborhood of the City of San Diego, and several sites in Del Mar, both coastal communities within the county.

It is only found on bare surface hardpans of Torrey sandstone with minimal topsoil, from 30–250 metres (98–820 ft) in elevation. Small marble-sized, ironstone concretions are present at all sites and are likely an edaphic requirement.

Ira L. Wiggins reported this species in his Flora of Baja California to be growing on sandstone bluffs and stony habitats along the coast of northwestern Baja California, but no specimens have been found to corroborate this claim.

== Ecology ==
=== Phenology ===
As this plant is a geophyte, occupying a habitat consisting mostly of hardpan substrata, it has an unusual growth habit in which once the tuberous, underground stems hit the hardpan, they will then spread out horizontally along the surface of the impenetrable substrate. In areas with the most shallow soil that is still conducive to growth, this plant tends to have incredibly irregular stems.

Annual growth begins after the first autumn rains, but this can be disturbed by any mid-winter drought conditions. If the plants are disturbed by any winter droughts, they will return to dormancy and wait until the next suitable growing season. This is most common in smaller plants, whilst larger plants will usually retain their leaves even through mid-winter droughts. This response may be mistaken for the death of plants, which are in fact dormant underground.

Timing of rains may be more important than the quantity. Years with consistent and evenly spaced autumn-winter rains correlate with the most flowering individuals. Likewise, lack of precipitation in the middle of winter is associated with less plants flowering. In any given year, 10% to 30% of individuals will flower. This means that population estimates made from flowering plants may significantly undercount the number of individuals.

Phenology of Dudleya brevifolia

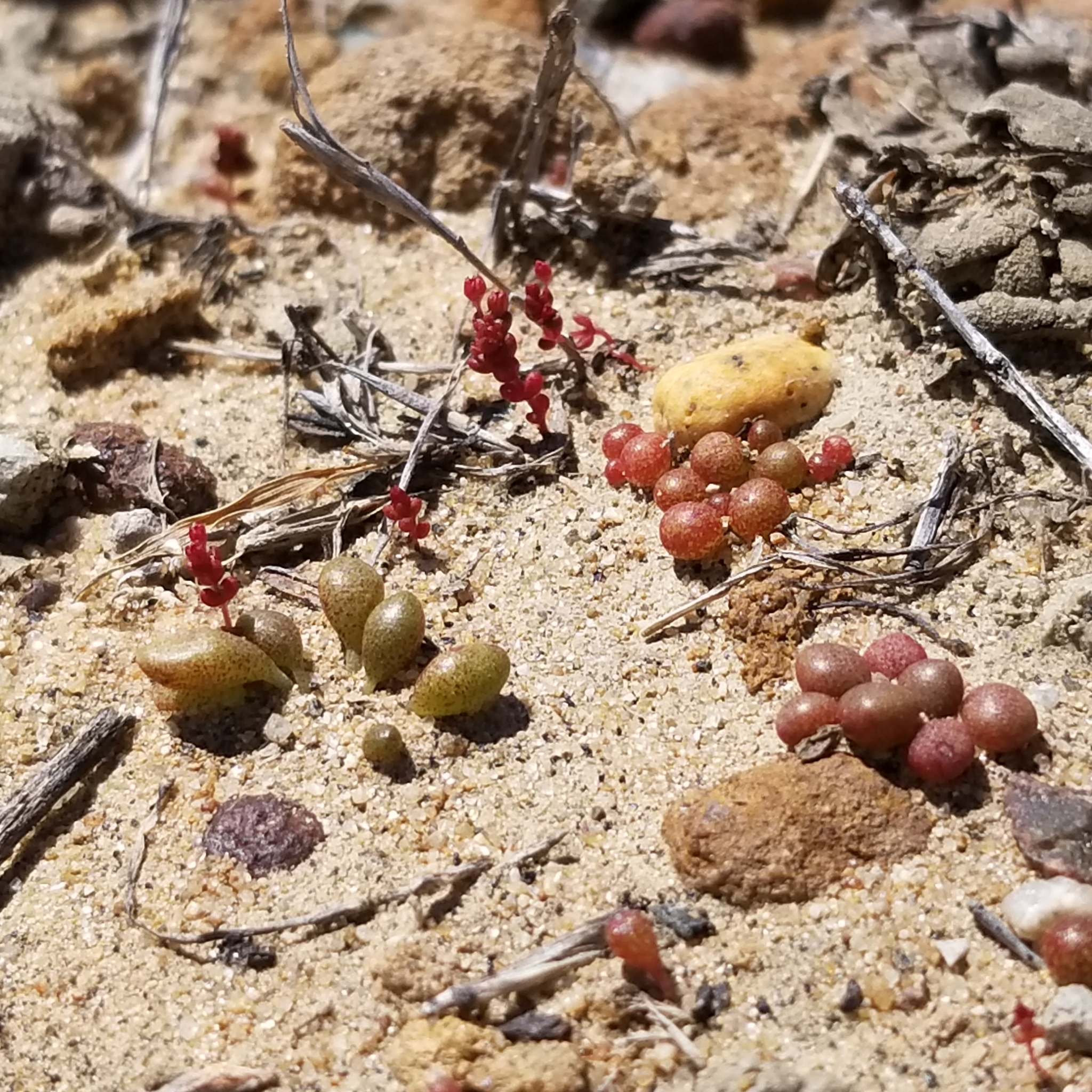
Plants emerge after winter rain.

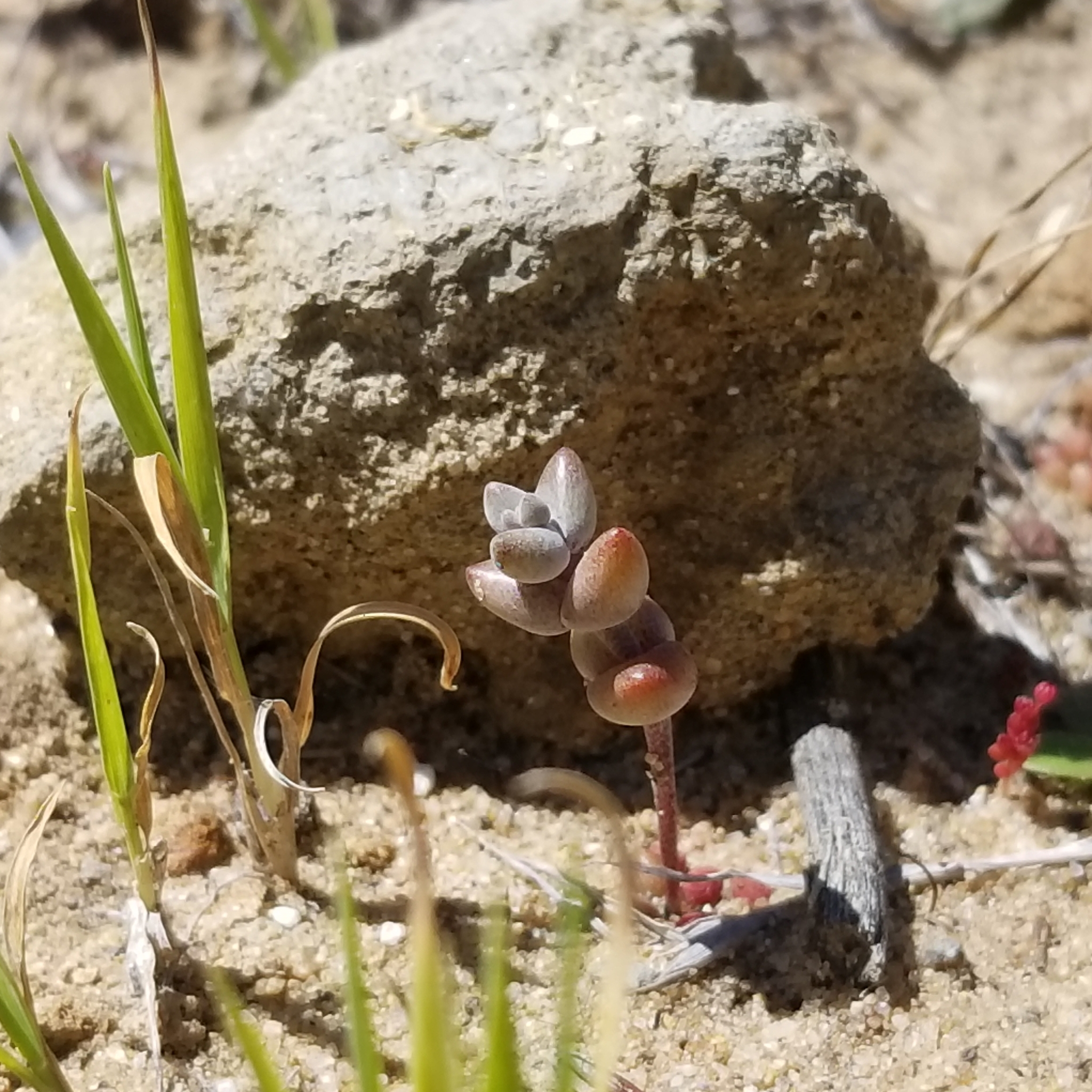
Nascent inflorescences start.

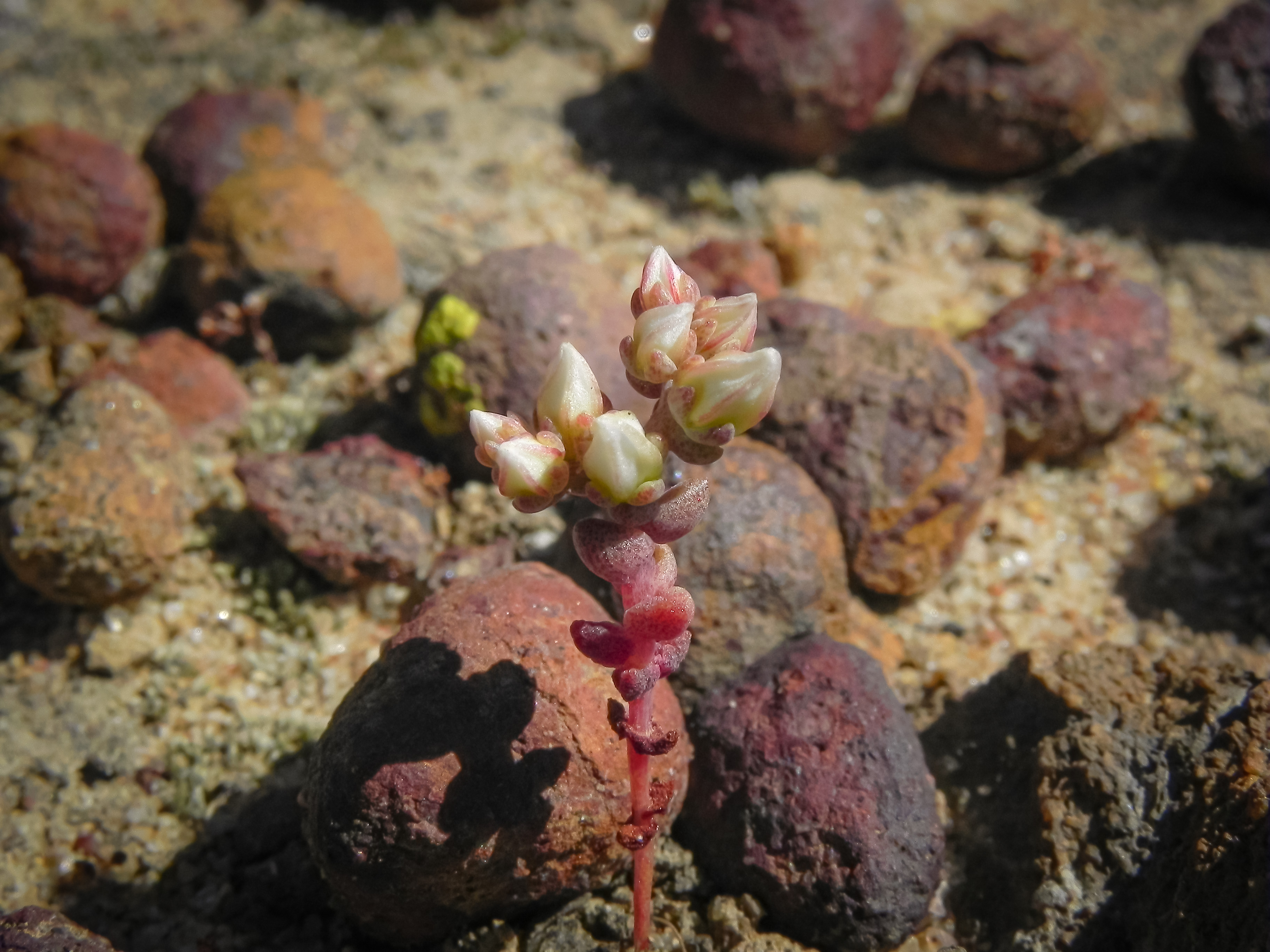
Basal leaves fully disappear, buds nearly mature.

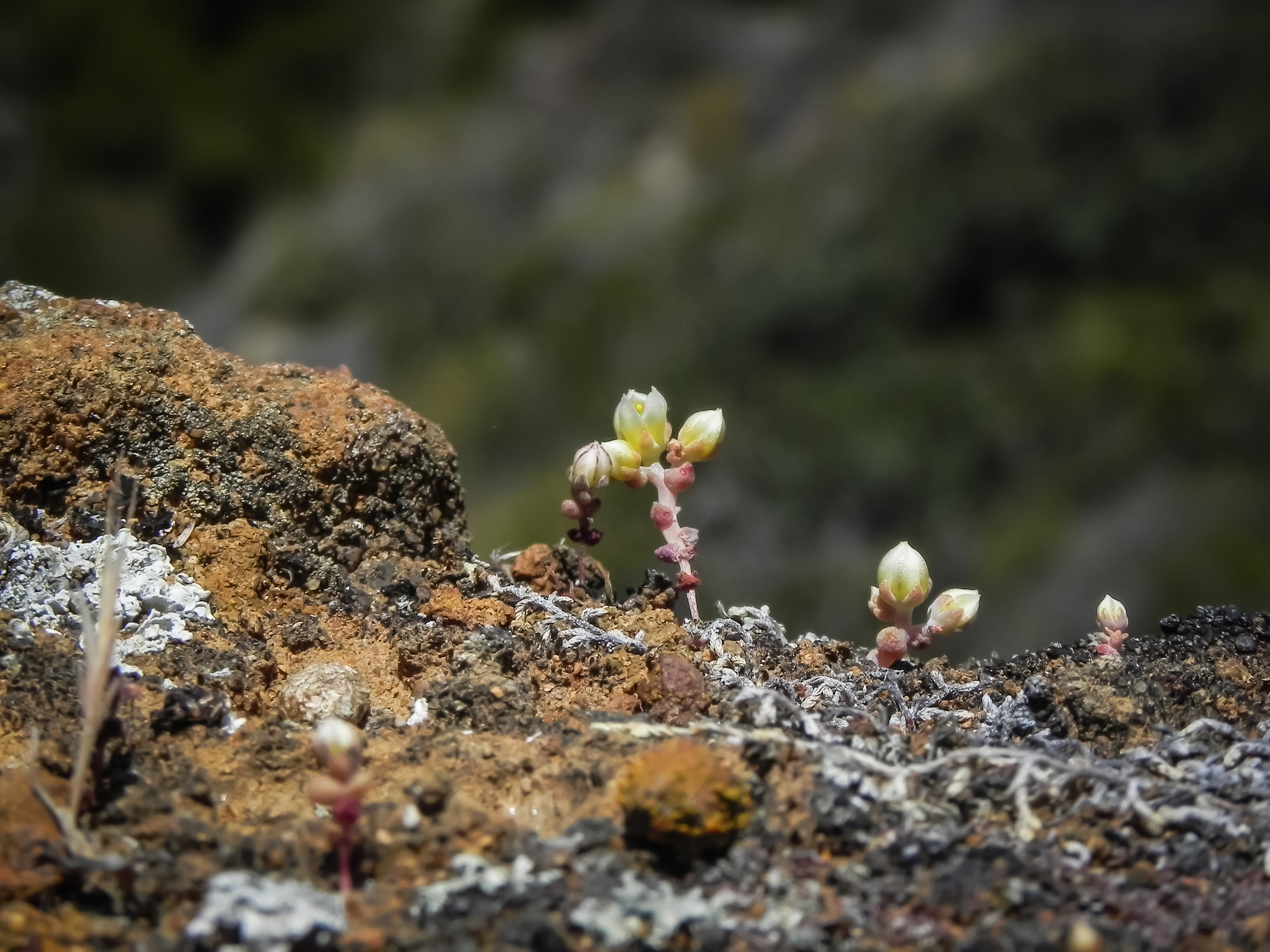
Flowers begin to open.

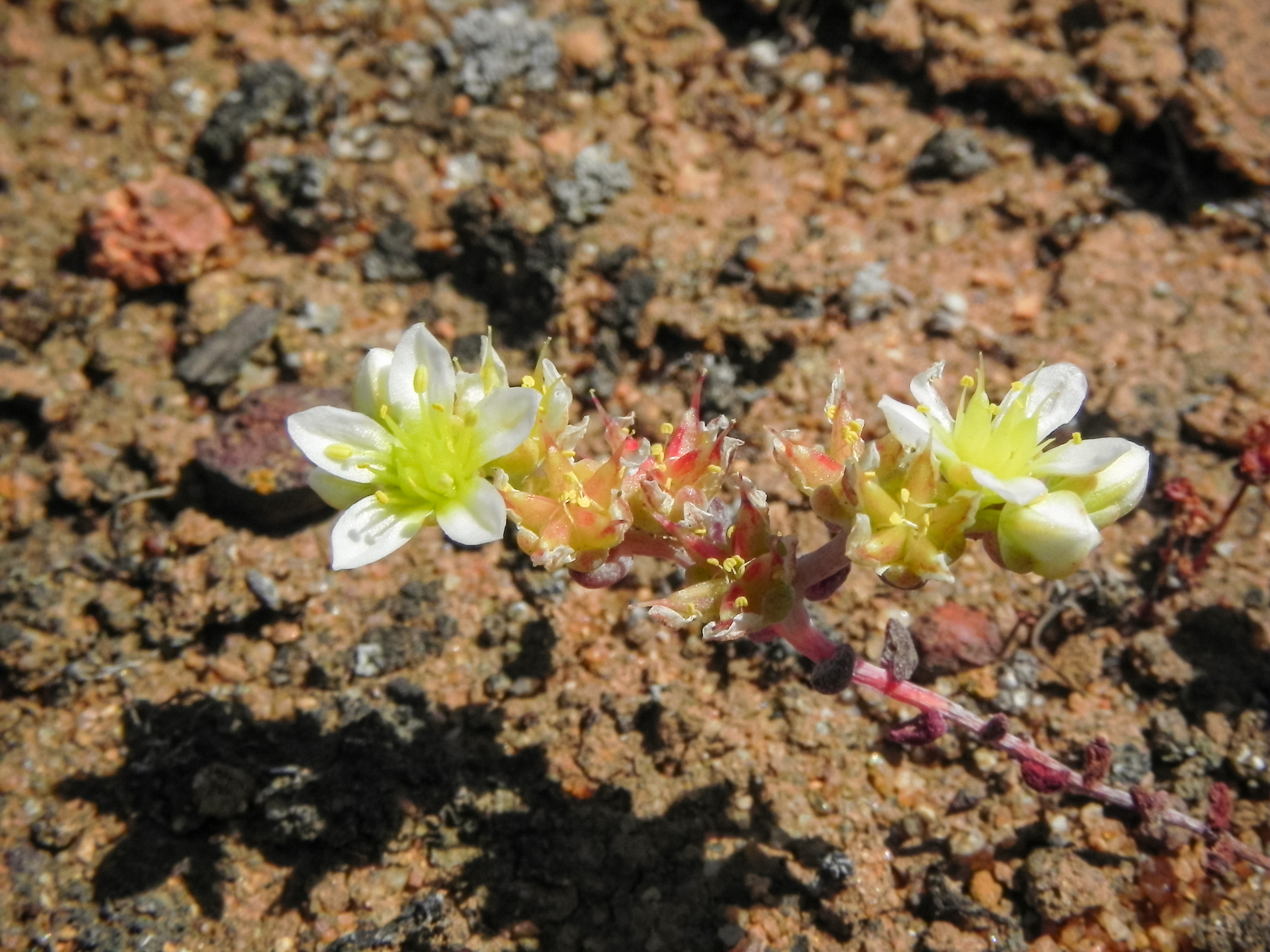
Plant flowers and fruits, before going dormant for the rest of the year.

=== Reproductive biology ===
This plant may reproduce through seed or via vegetative means. The vast majority of Dudleya species have difficulty in rooting from detached leaves, a trait that distinguished them from Echeveria in early taxonomic studies. In most rosette-forming evergreen Dudleya, the leaves will simply callous, wrinkle, and die. However, some species, especially deciduous ones, may reproduce readily from detached leaves. One to three weeks after the leaves are detached from the plant, roots will emerge from the petiole base.

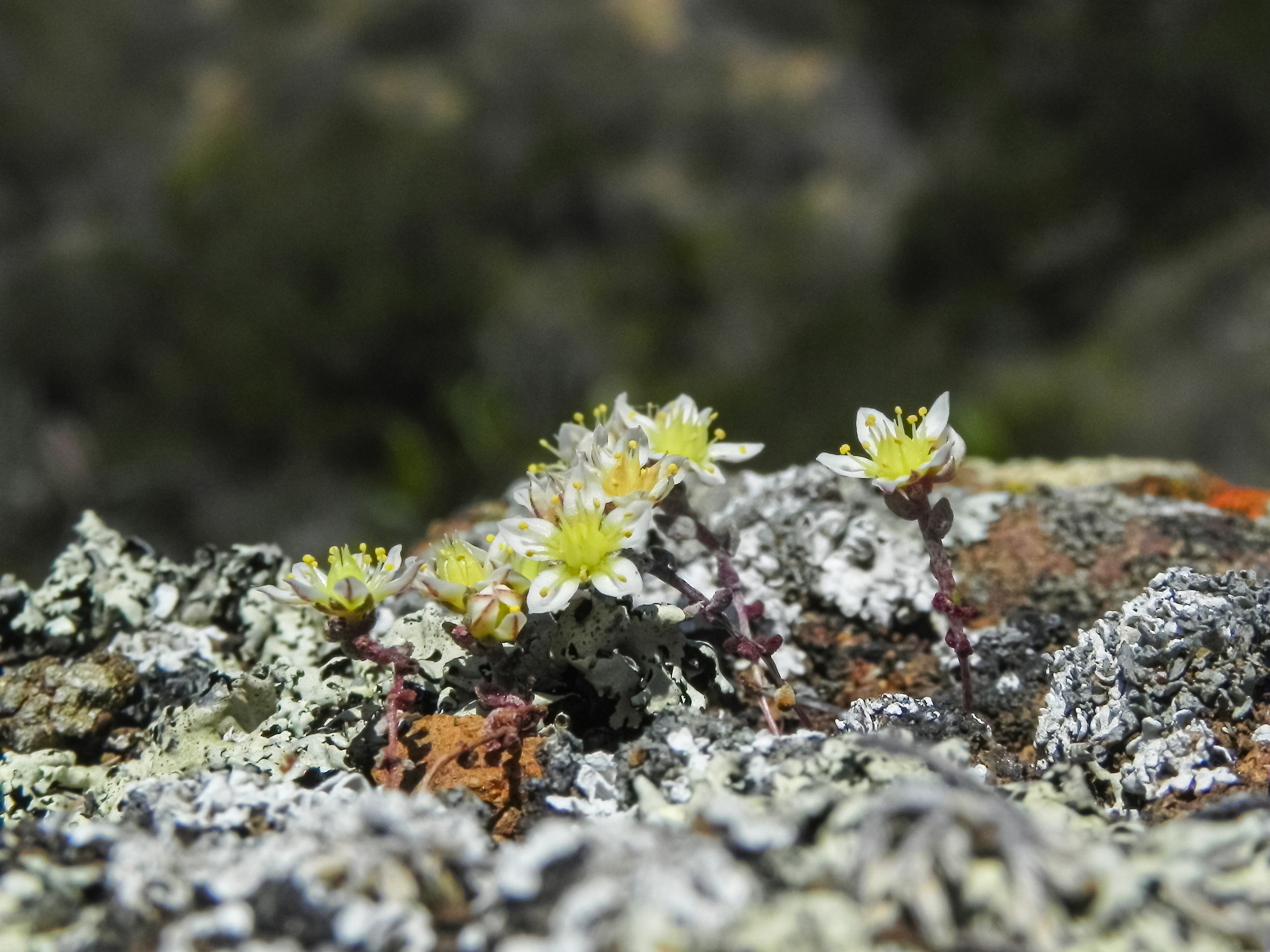
Flowering at the edge of a mesa.

Seeds are typically dispersed by wind or water. The seeds are small, but are larger in comparison to other members of Dudleya, as plant size is inversely correlated with seed size. The dried inflorescences may detach and tumble along the sandy mesas, which presumably may disperse seed.

Many pollinators make visits to the flowers of D. brevifolia. These include bee flies (Bombyliidae), hover flies, soft-winged flower beetles (Dasytes species, within the family Melyridae), western honey bees, bumble bees and digger bees (tribe Anthrophorini).

== Conservation ==
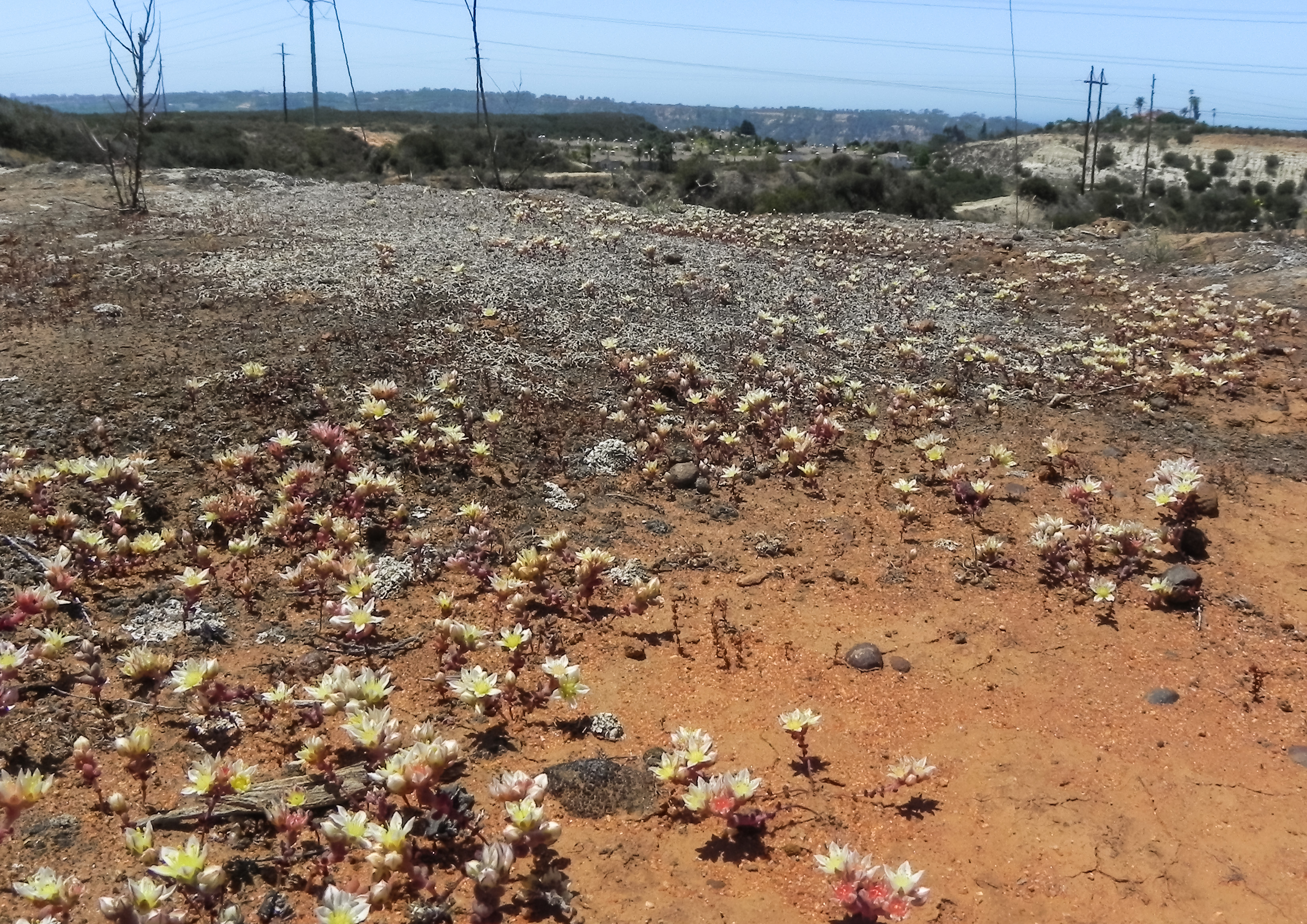
A population at Carmel Mountain, looking southwest to Torrey Pines.

The topography of coastal San Diego County is often challenging for urban development, with steep canyons shearing through flat mesas. The mesas, while suitable for development, were also an important location for vernal pools and other open habitats. Populations of deciduous Dudleya, like the variegated liveforever, Blochman's dudleya, and the many-stem dudleya, are resident to many of the vernal pools and clearings on top of these mesas, with the short-leaved dudleya representing a group localized to the bare surface hardpans of sandstone from Torrey Pines to La Jolla.

Their population is highly dependent on rainfall, exploding in population when there is annual rainfall over 10 inches, and drastically shrinking when there is less than 4 inches of annual rainfall. The species is seriously threatened by urbanization, vehicles, foot traffic, and fire break construction.

Total population estimates vary by year and by the researcher. Extensive studies have been completed on Carmel Mountain in the Carmel Valley community of San Diego. The Multiple Species Conservation Program (MSCP) of San Diego County estimated the Carmel Mountain population at just 1446 individuals in 2002, and at 113,134 individuals in 2006. Most recently, in 2008, UCLA faculty Dr. Hartmut S. Walter and Matthew Luskin estimated the Carmel Mountain population at over 100,000 individuals.

Dudleya brevifolia is a high conservation priority because it exists only in these 5 locations (listed by decreasing average yearly population): Torrey Pines State Natural Reserve, Carmel Mountain (on multiple sites), Crest Canyon, Skeletal Canyon, and Torrey Pines Extension. The total habitat outside of Torrey Pines State Natural Reserve that contains this species was estimated at just 2,667 square meters.

=== Endangered species ===
Dudleya brevifolia is currently listed as an endangered species by the state of California and by the California Native Plant Society.

Dudleya blochmaniae subsp. brevifolia was listed as an endangered species by the U.S. Fish and Wildlife Service in January 1982. In October 1996 they withdrew federal protection as an endangered species, citing the threats to the species had diminished and that it was a "covered species" within the Multiple Species Conservation Program (MSCP) of southern San Diego County.
