= Fletcher Hills =

- Location within California Location within the United States

Highest point
- Elevation: 833 ft (254 m)

Geography
- Country: United States
- State: California
- District: San Diego County
- Range coordinates: 32°48′22.181″N 116°59′37.100″W
- Topo map: USGS El Cajon

The Fletcher Hills are a low mountain range in the Peninsular Ranges, in southwestern San Diego County, California.

The name Fletcher Hills also refers to a neighborhood near San Diego, California which lies primarily in the city of El Cajon and partially in La Mesa. The area was developed in 1927–1928 by San Diego developer Ed Fletcher.

== See also ==
- Ed Fletcher, namesake of Fletcher Hills
