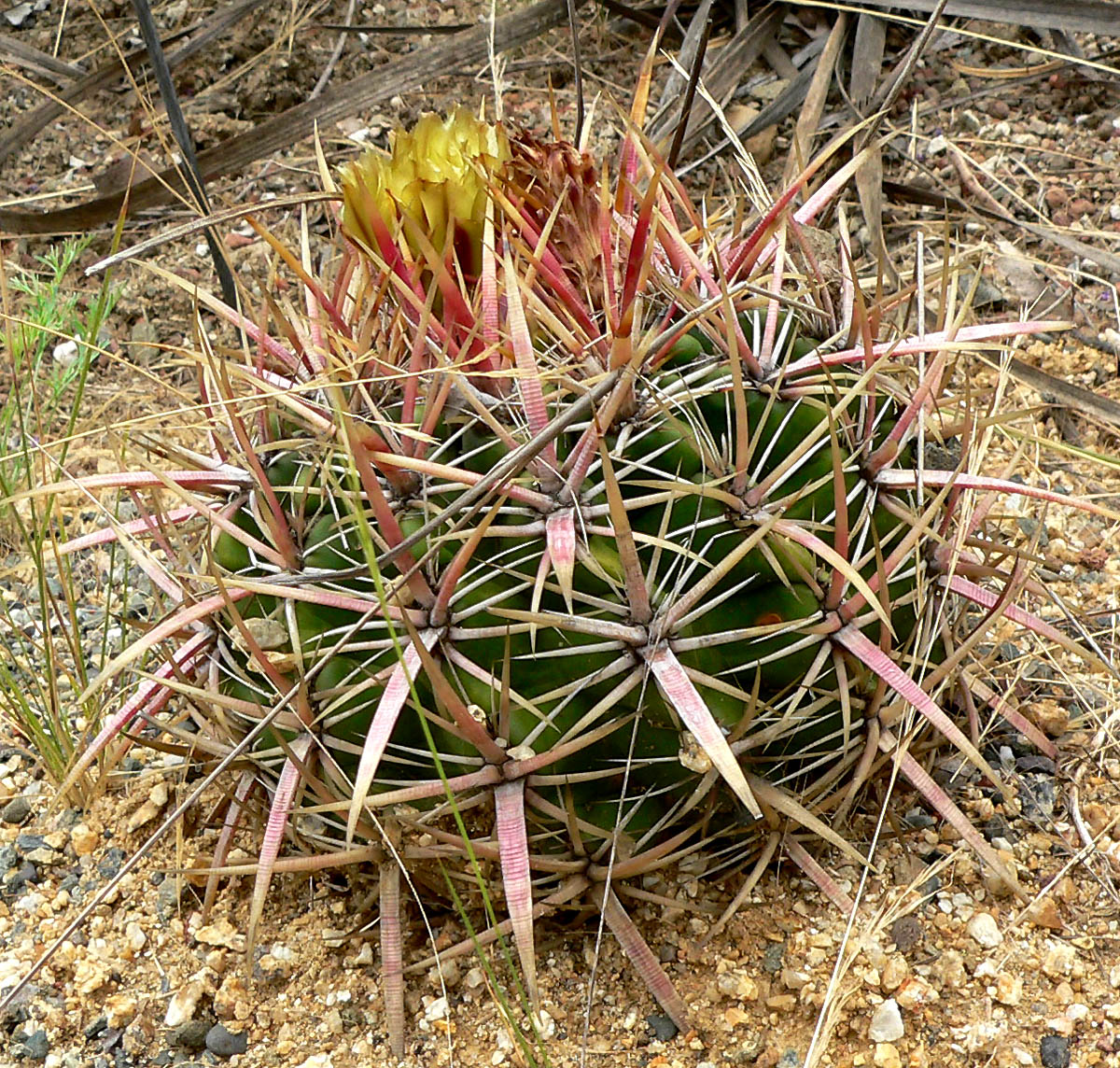
- Ferocactus viridescens (juvenile plant).
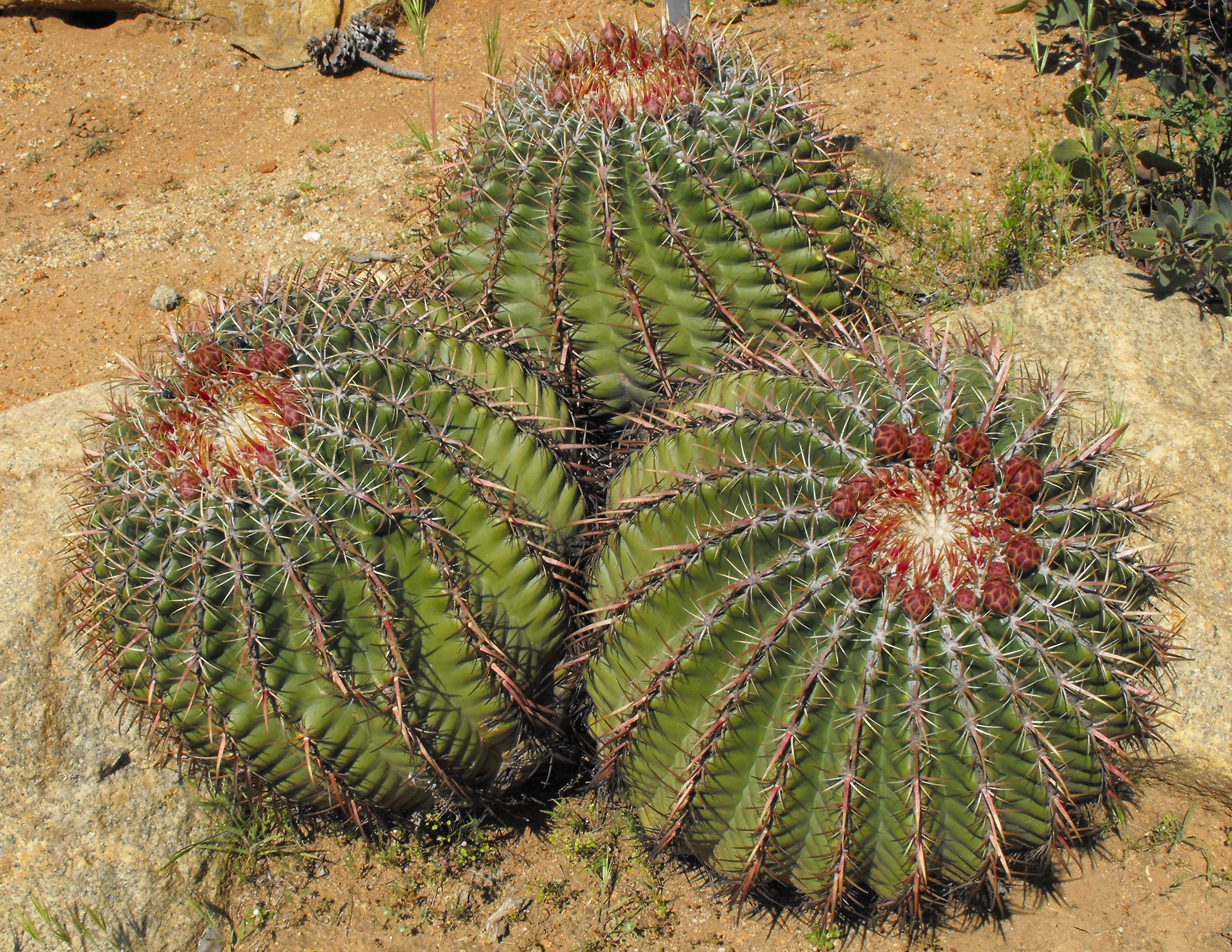
- Trio of mature plants; Escondido, California.

Conservation status
- Least Concern (IUCN 3.1)

Scientific classification
- Kingdom: Plantae
- Clade: Tracheophytes
- Clade: Angiosperms
- Clade: Eudicots
- Order: Caryophyllales
- Family: Cactaceae
- Subfamily: Cactoideae
- Genus: Ferocactus
- Species: F. viridescens

Binomial name
- Ferocactus viridescens (Torr. & Gray) Britt. & Rose

Synonyms
- List: Echinocactus acanthodes Lem.; Echinocactus cylindraceus Engelm.; Echinocactus orcuttii Engelm. ex Orcutt; Echinocactus viridescens Nutt.; Ferocactus acanthodes (Lem.) Britton & Rose; Ferocactus californicus (Monv. ex Labour.) Borg; Ferocactus orcuttii (Engelm. ex Orcutt) Britton & Rose; Ferocactus viridescens var. littoralis G.E.Linds.; Ferocactus viridescens subsp. littoralis (G.E.Linds.) F.Wolf & R.Wolf; Ferocactus viridescens var. orcuttii (Engelm. ex Orcutt) G.Unger; Ferocactus viridescens subsp. orcuttii (Engelm. ex Orcutt) F.Wolf & R.Wolf; Melocactus viridescens Nutt. ex Teschem.; Ferocactus viridescens var. littoralis G.E.Linds. G.E.Linds.

= Ferocactus viridescens =

Species of cactus

Ferocactus viridescens is a species of flowering plant in the cactus family Cactaceae. This barrel cactus is known by several common names, including coast barrel cactus, keg cactus and San Diego barrel cactus. Most of its native range in the United States is in San Diego County, California, where it is threatened by development, agriculture, and other alterations in its habitat. It is also found in northern Baja California, Mexico.

== Description ==
Ferocactus viridescens is a solitary barrel cactus, typically spherical, oblate, or nearly cylindrical, reaching heights of 10-30(-45)cm and diameters of 10-20(-35)cm. It has bright green flesh arranged into several 13 to 34 blunt ribs covered in arrays of long spines. The areoles are narrow elliptic to oval, 10–20 mm (0.39–0.79 in) long, with brownish tomentum, bearing 10-19 spines per areole, including central and radial spines. The central spines are initially pink or yellowish, becoming duller with age, with the principal central spine measuring 30–50 cm (12–20 in) long and 2-3(-5) mm broad. The 10-20 radial spines are similar to the centrals but smaller, 1–2 cm (0.39–0.79 in) long.

Blooming from spring to early summer, the species produces infundibuliform flowers that are 2.5–5 cm (0.98–1.97 in) long and 3–6 cm (1.2–2.4 in) in diameter, with greenish-yellow or greenish perianth segments sometimes tinged with pink. The flower tube bears stamens almost to the top of the ovary, with yellow stigma lobes. The fruits are barrel-like, bright yellow (rarely reddish), with a pleasant acid taste, measuring 20–35 mm (0.79–1.38 in) long and 15–25 mm (0.59–0.98 in) across. They have a leathery skin and about 30 fimbriate-denticulate scales, dehiscent through a basal pore. The seeds are elongate-obovoid, minutely reticulate, and measure 1.6–1.8 mm (0.063–0.071 in) long.

== Taxonomy ==
=== Taxonomic history ===
Ferocactus viridescens was first discovered in 1836 by Thomas Nuttall, an English botanist and naturalist. Nuttall had arrived in San Diego aboard the hide ship Pilgrim, and stayed in the harbor for three weeks while he waited for a Bryant and Sturgis ship to sail him back to Boston. From Nuttall's specimens, John Torrey and Asa Gray described Echinocactus viridescens in 1840. The Latin specific epithet viridescens means "turning green". Nathaniel Lord Britton and Joseph Nelson Rose later reclassified the species under the genus Ferocactus in 1922, creating the current combination.

=== Infrataxa ===
Some authors recognize infraspecific taxa for this species, but vary in their recognition of the rank.

- Ferocactus viridescens var. littoralis G.E. Linds. – It is also infraspecifically recognized at subspecies rank as subsp. littoralis (G.E. Linds.) F. & R. Wolf. Commonly known as the Santo Tomás coast barrel cactus. A variety endemic to Baja California, first collected by Reid Moran at Santo Tomás. Compared to the typical variety, var. littoralis is characterized by a more golden hue, a taller size, and a higher number of ribs and central spines. This variety is occurs from north of Ensenada (near Punta Salsipuedes) south to the vicinity of Misión Santo Domingo de la Frontera.

== Distribution and habitat ==
Ferocactus viridescens occurs in northwestern Baja California, Mexico and San Diego County in the United States. In Baja California, it is a common coastal species occurring from the vicinity of San Quintín, at the fringe of the California Floristic Province, north to the international border near Tijuana. In San Diego County, it mostly occurs in the southwestern coastal part of the county, although declining in abundance due to urbanization. Ferocactus viridescens reaches its northern limit at the San Luis Rey River in Oceanside and the neighboring parts of Marine Corps Base Camp Pendleton.

Its preferred habitat varies, as it inhabits elevations ranging from sea level to 200 meters (656 feet), in coastal, mild-winter microclimates as well as warmer, inland areas that may experience autumn or winter frosts. It grows in sandy and gravelly soils with a generally high mineral content (but comparatively low amounts of organic matter).

Habitats where Ferocactus viridescens may be found include chaparral, arid hills, dry and grassy dunes, or rocky coastal bluffs and sun-baked cliffs; cacti especially thrive along the Californian and Mexican west coasts, as they experience significant fog cover (marine layer) throughout the year, notably in the mornings and evenings, allowing the plants to absorb sufficient moisture before the heat of the day. This habitat also gives Ferocactus viridescens an innate tolerance for salts and minerals that many botanical species simply cannot handle. The San Diego barrel cactus can also be found on shrub-covered hillsides, often at the crests of slopes, and in cobbles. Occasionally, it is found on the edges of vernal pools, sometimes in large numbers. This habitat, which is more moist compared to its usual xeric environment, is unusual for the plant, and may occur sporadically during years of excessive precipitation in the area.

== Cultivation ==
This plant, which is hardy down to 5 °C (41 °F), must be grown under glass in temperate regions, though it may be placed outside in a sheltered spot in the warm summer months. It has gained the Royal Horticultural Society's Award of Garden Merit.
