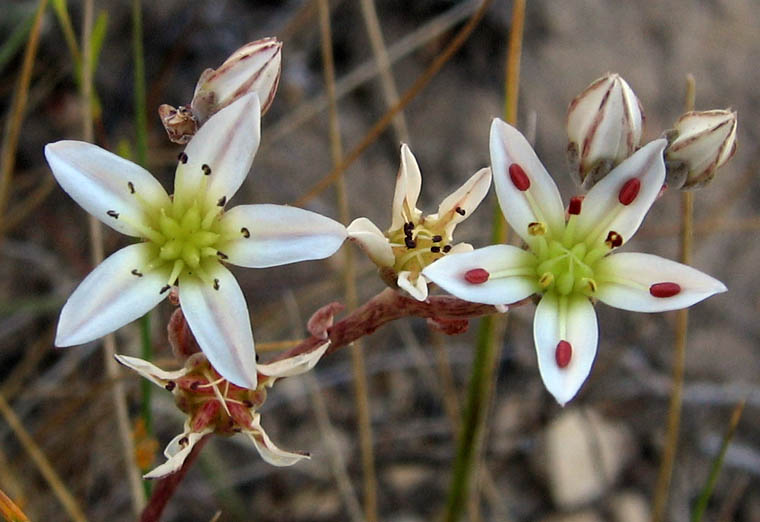
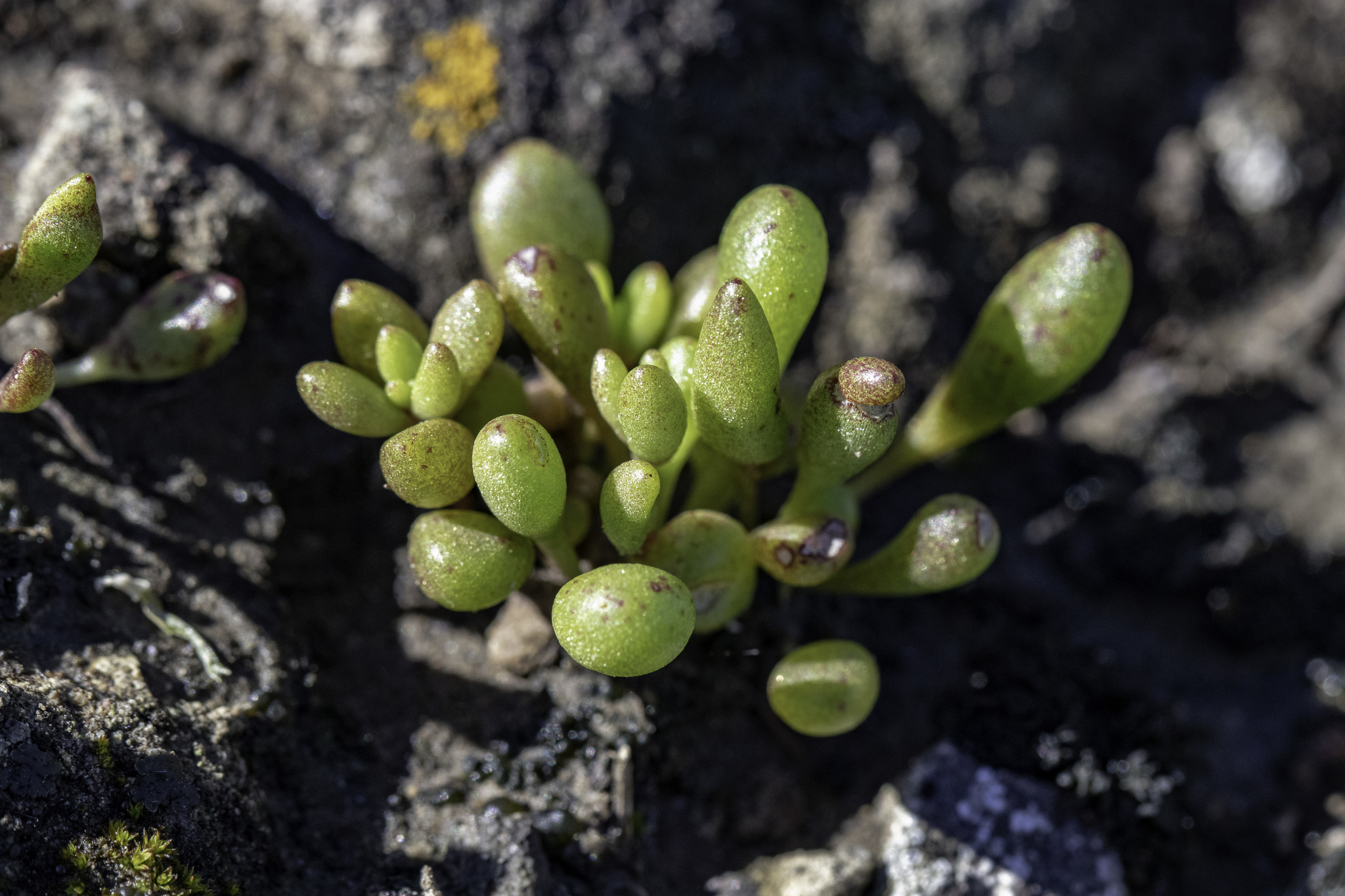
- Flowering (top) and basal leaves (bottom)

Conservation status
- Imperiled (NatureServe)

Scientific classification
- Kingdom: Plantae
- Clade: Tracheophytes
- Clade: Angiosperms
- Clade: Eudicots
- Order: Saxifragales
- Family: Crassulaceae
- Genus: Dudleya
- Species: D. blochmaniae

Binomial name
- Dudleya blochmaniae (Eastw.) Moran
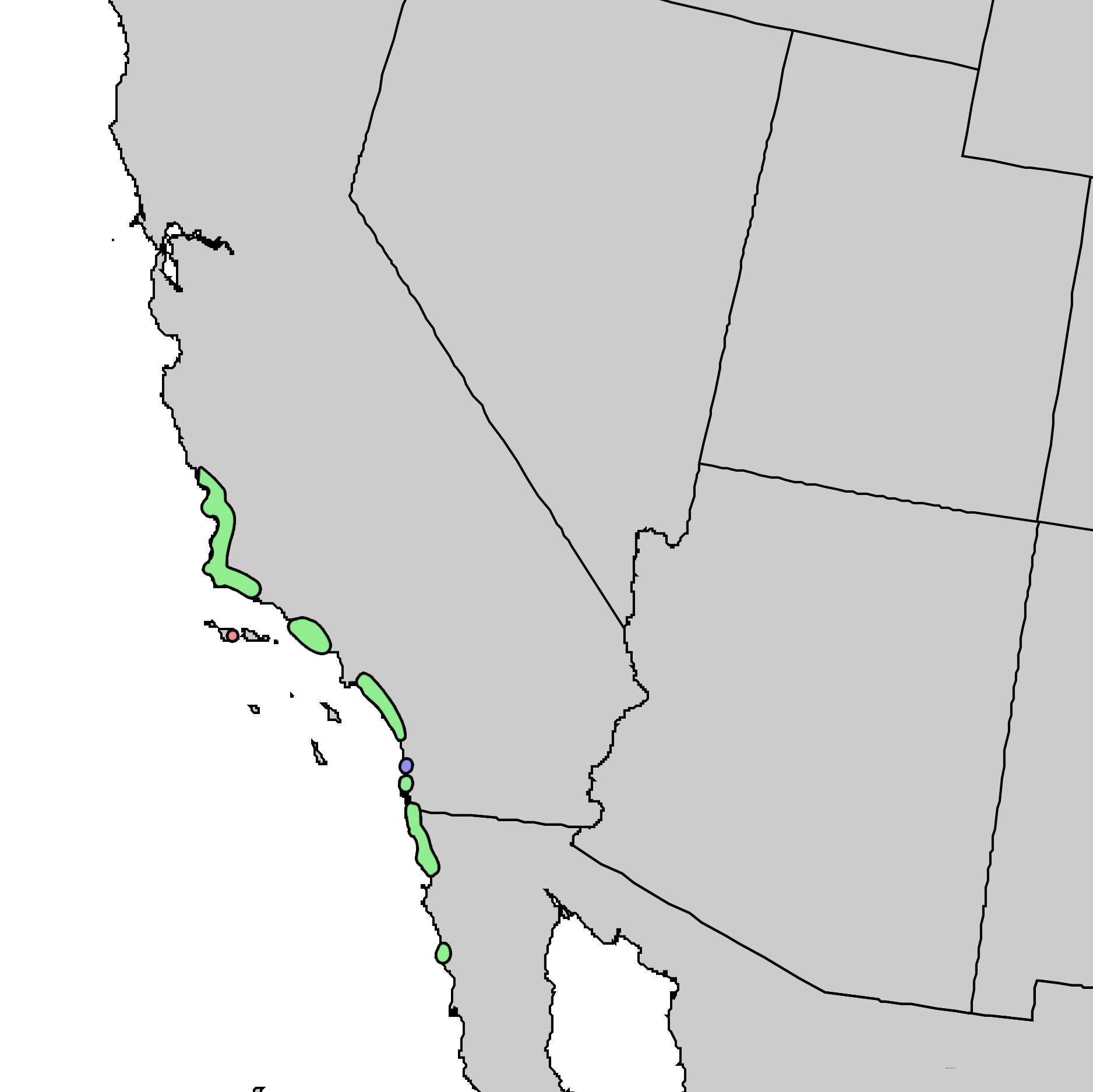
- Range map of Dudleya blochmaniae ssp. blochmaniae (green), Dudleya blochmaniae ssp. insularis (red), and Dudleya brevifolia (blue)

Synonyms
- Sedum blochmaniae Eastw.; subsp. blochmaniae: Hasseanthus blochmaniae Rose; Hasseanthus kessleri Davidson; Sedum gertrudianum Eastw.; subsp. insularis: Hasseanthus blochmaniae subsp. insularis Moran; Hasseanthus insularis (Moran) P.H.Thomson

= Dudleya blochmaniae =

Species of succulent plant

Dudleya blochmaniae is a summer-deciduous succulent plant known by the common names Blochman's liveforever or Blochman's dudleya. This species of Dudleya survives part of the year with no aboveground presence, surviving as underground corm-like roots in deciduous months. It is characterized by white, star-shaped and spreading flowers that emerge after sufficient rainfall. It is found along the Pacific coast of the California Floristic Province, from the vicinity of San Luis Obispo in California to Punta Colonet in Baja California.

== Description ==
=== Vegetative morphology ===
This plant forms a basal rosette from an underground corm. The small rosette is around only 0.5 to 7 cm, and the leaves are summer deciduous. The leaves are 1 to 6 cm long, more or less shaped, oblanceolate to club-shaped, and when removed from the plant, the point of detachment will turn red with the wound. The leaves are 1 to 4 mm wide, and their tip is acute to rounded. The leaf petiole is more or less narrow.

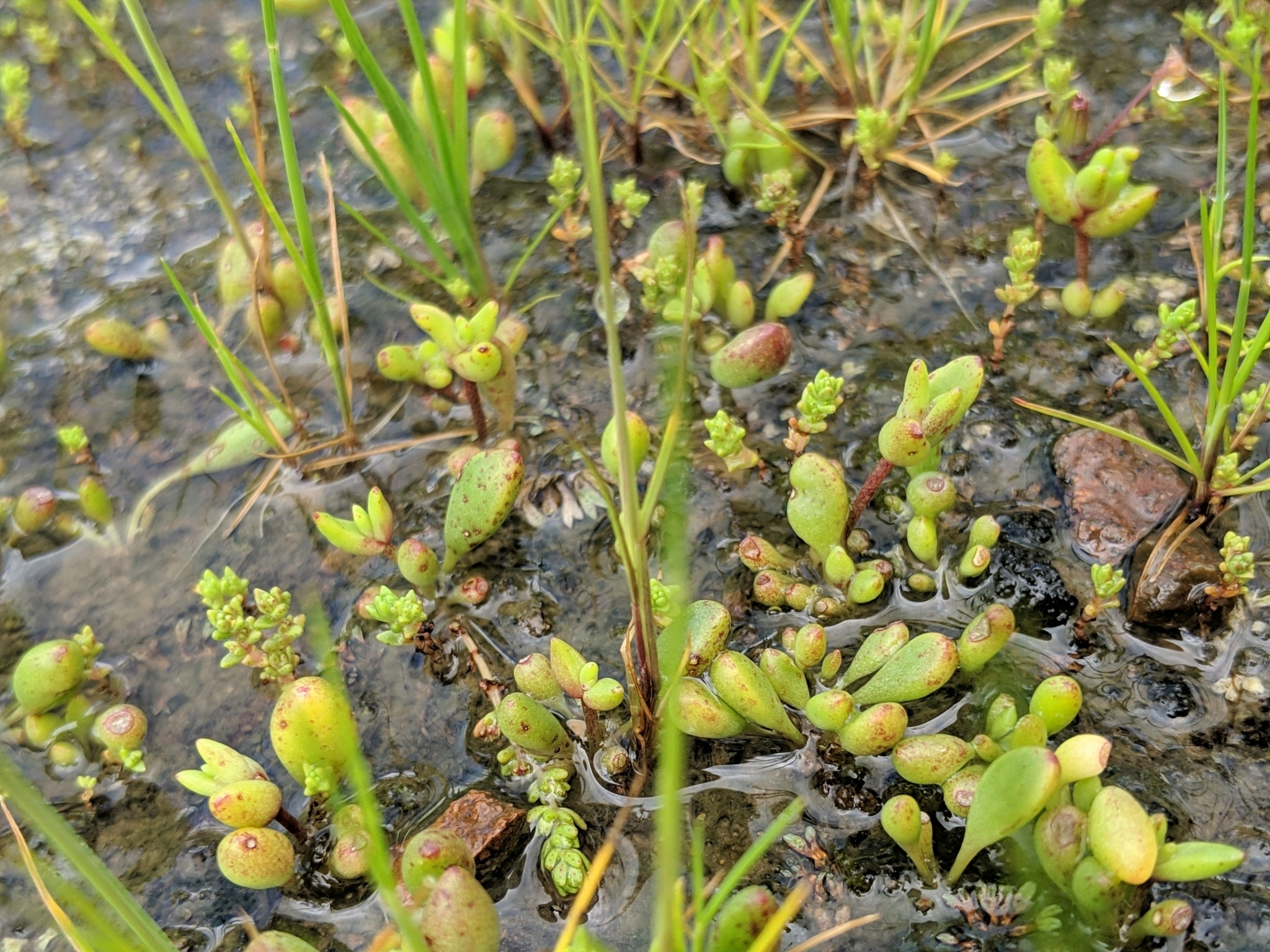
Plants emerging in the rain

=== Reproductive morphology ===
The inflorescence branches 2 to 3 times, and then may or may not rebranch once more. The terminal branches on the inflorescence are 1 to 6 cm long, and have 3 to 10 flowers. The lower bracts on the inflorescence are often more than twice as long as they are wide. The pedicels are less than 1 mm long. The flower is white and star shaped. The sepals are 1.5 to 4 mm long, shaped deltate to ovate. The petals spread from the base, and are 5 to 10 mm large, shaped elliptic, with an acute tip, and colored white. The keel of the petals is often lined with a red-lineolate color.

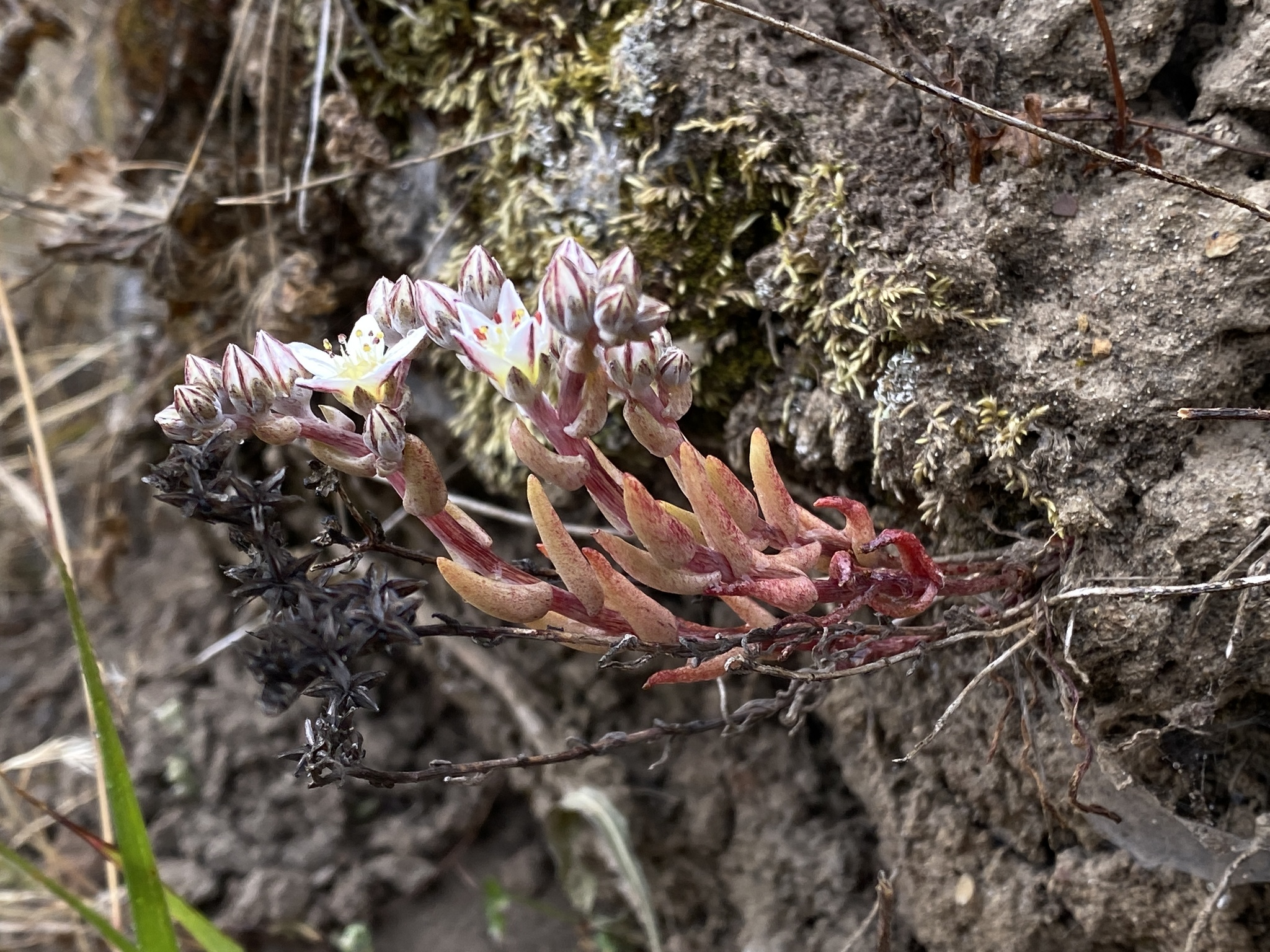
Subspecies blochmaniae flowering in habitat.

== Subdivisions ==
Named subspecies include:

Dudleya blochmaniae Eastwood (Moran) subsp. blochmaniae

Conservation status
Imperiled Subspecies (NatureServe)

Known by the common name Blochman's liveforever or Blochman's dudleya. It is found from San Simeon, California south to Punta Colonet, Baja California. It is also found on Santa Cruz Island.

The plant forms a basal rosette consisting of 3 to 12 leaves. The leaf blade is shaped shaped oblanceolate, 1 to 4 cm long. The floral stems are 3 to 12 cm long, and bracts 0.5 to 1.4 cm large. The young stems and leaves may be slightly glaucous. The petals are 6 to 10 mm long.

Flowering April to June. Chromosome number is n = 17, 34, 51. Occurs on open, rocky slopes and on serpentine or clay-dominated soils, typically below an elevation of 450 meters.

Dudleya blochmaniae (Eastwood) Moran subsp. insularis (Moran) Moran

Conservation status
Critically Imperiled Subspecies (NatureServe)

Known by the common name Santa Rosa Island liveforever or Santa Rosa Island dudleya. Endemic to Santa Rosa Island, where it is only found near Old Ranch Point.

The basal rosette has a high number of leaves for the plant's size, 15 to 30, but sometimes up to 50. The leaf blade is shaped clavate-oblanceolate, 1 to 3.5 cm. The floral stems are 3 to 7 cm long, and the bracts 0.6 to 1.2 cm large. The young stems and leaves are gray-glaucous. The petals are 6 to 8 mm long.

Flowering April to June. Chromosome number is n = 17. Occurs on heavy soil on coastal bluffs, from 3 to 90 meters.

== Conservation ==
This species is of conservation concern, as suitable habitat sites are rapidly declining and face serious threats. Threats include development, urbanization, vehicles, recreation, grazing by feral herbivores, and exotic plants. In 1998 there were only twenty-four confirmed extant sites in California, out of a total of thirty-six sites. In Baja California, this species is represented from fewer than five occurrences.

== Cultivation ==
This species is a corm-like succulent that flowers in late spring to early summer. It often blooms less than a year after being sowed. Plants may disappear if they are placed in locations with high rainfall.
