= Fletcher Hills, California =

Coordinates: 32.793218°N 116.997758°W

- Neighborhood
- Interactive map of Fletcher Hills, California
- Country: United States
- State: California
- County: San Diego
- ZIP code: 92099
- Area code: 619

Fletcher Hills is a neighborhood in El Cajon and La Mesa, California.

== Geography ==
Fletcher Hills is located in the northeastern part of La Mesa and El Cajon.

== Demographics ==
The racial makeup of Fletcher Hills was 57,798 (58.4%) White, 5,207 (5.2%) African American, 724 (0.7%) Native American, 2,435 (2.4%) Asian (1.2% Filipino, 0.4% Chinese, 0.3% Vietnamese, and 0.5% other) and 386 (0.4%) Pacific Islander. Hispanic or Latino of any race were 27,024 persons (27.3%).
