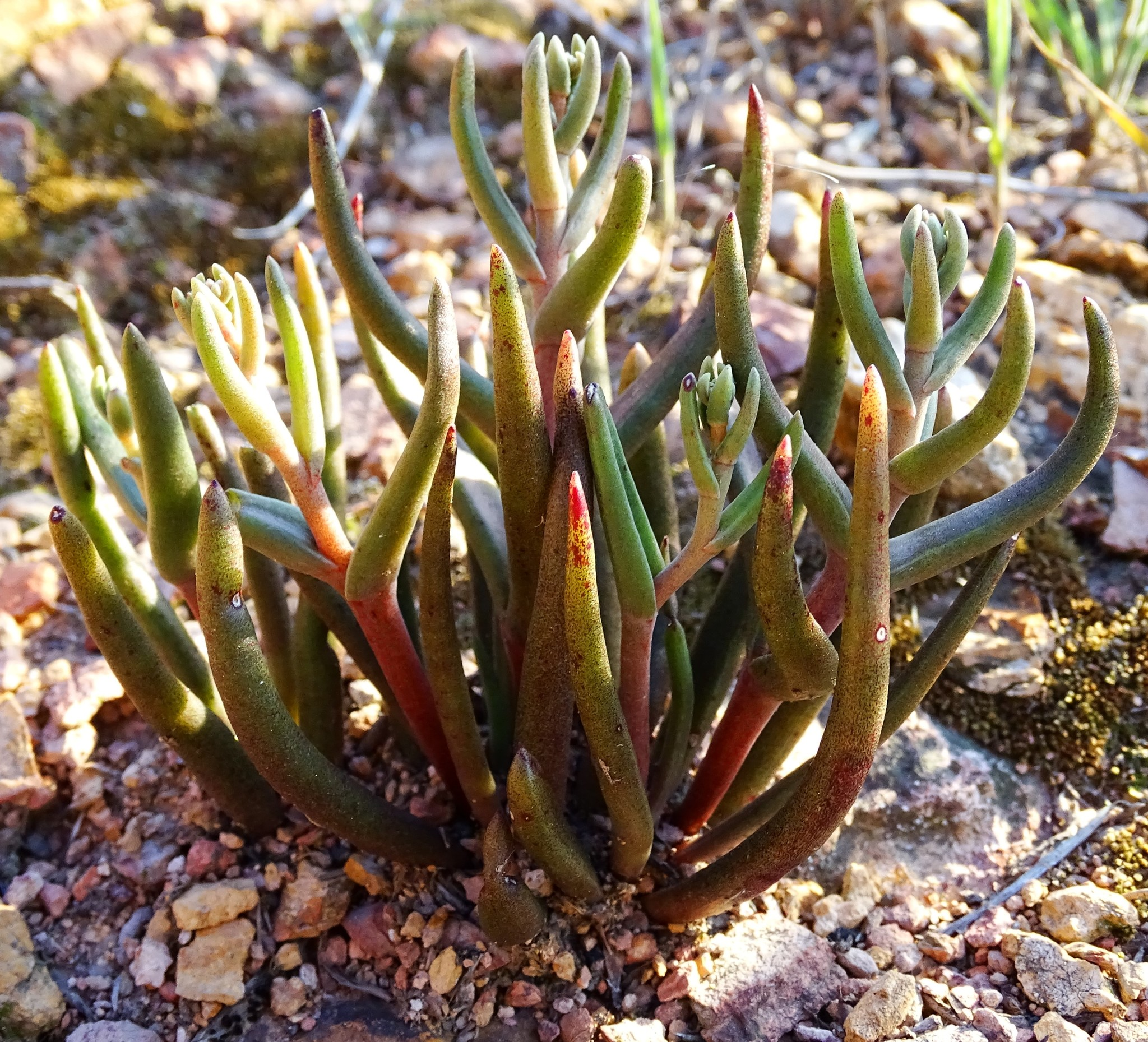

Conservation status
- Imperiled (NatureServe)

Scientific classification
- Kingdom: Plantae
- Clade: Tracheophytes
- Clade: Angiosperms
- Clade: Eudicots
- Order: Saxifragales
- Family: Crassulaceae
- Genus: Dudleya
- Species: D. multicaulis

Binomial name
- Dudleya multicaulis (Rose) Moran

Synonyms
- Hasseanthus elongatus Rose; Hasseanthus multicaulis Rose; Hasseanthus oblongorhizus (A.Berger) P.H.Thomson; Sedum oblongorhizum A.Berger; Sedum sanctae-monicae A.Berger

= Dudleya multicaulis =

Species of succulent

Dudleya multicaulis is a succulent plant known by the common name manystem liveforever or many-stemmed dudleya. This Dudleya is endemic to southern California, where it is rare and seriously threatened as its habitat is altered by humans. Many occurrences of this species have been extirpated. This species is characterized by a few short, fingerlike cylindrical leaves with pointed tips, and its erect peduncle, which is topped with a branching inflorescence bearing up to 15 flowers on each long, thin branch. The flowers, which appear in late spring, have pointed yellow petals and long stamens. It is usually found on heavy clay or rocky soils and outcrops.

== Description ==
=== Morphology ===
Dudleya multicaulis is thought to represent the most basal member of the Dudleya subgenus Hasseanthus, which are characterized by paedomorphic adaptations including vernal foliage and an underground, tuberous caudex also seen in Dudleya seedlings. The caudex has been reduced to a subterranean structure roughly equivalent to a corm. The corm has an oblong shape, and measures 1.5–5 cm (0.59–1.97 in) long by 3–18 mm (0.12–0.71 in) wide. The leaves are arranged in 1 to 4 rosettes which are 2–6 cm (0.79–2.36 in) wide. The 5 to 15 green leaves are summer deciduous, with their surfaces not or somewhat glaucous. The leaves are shaped cylindric and linear except at the base, with the bases flushing with purple-red when the leaves are detached or damaged at that point. The leaves measure 4–15 cm (1.6–5.9 in) long by 2–6 mm (0.079–0.236 in) wide, with the base 4–10 mm (0.16–0.39 in) wide, and the tip of the leaf sharply acute.

The inflorescence is on a peduncle 4–23 cm (1.6–9.1 in) high and 2–4 mm (0.079–0.157 in) wide. There are 7 to 18 strongly ascending bracts, with a similar linear shape to the rosette leaves. The inflorescence may first branch 2 or more times, and then subsequently rebranch 0 to 1 more times. The terminal branches (cincinni) are 2–10 cm (0.79–3.94 in) long, and have 3 to 15 flowers, which are suspended on pedicels 0.5–3 mm (0.020–0.118 in) long.

The flowers are odorless. The petals are connate for 1–2 mm (0.039–0.079 in), and spread from the near middle, colored a bright yellow to a fading pale-yellow, and often lined-red at the keel. The petals are shaped elliptic-lanceolate and measure 5–9 mm (0.20–0.35 in) long by 2–3 mm (0.079–0.118 in) wide. The apex of the petals is acute. The sepals measure 2–3 mm (0.079–0.118 in) long and are shaped deltate-acute. The corolla measures 12–18 mm (0.47–0.71 in) in diameter. The pistils are connate for 1–2 mm (0.039–0.079 in) and are ascending. The ovaries are 3.5–6 mm (0.14–0.24 in) long, while the styles are 1.5–2 mm (0.059–0.079 in). Flowering is in late spring from May to June.

== Distribution and habitat ==
Dudleya multicaulis is endemic to the Los Angeles coastal plain and the adjacent hills, parts of the Transverse and Peninsular ranges, and south towards northern San Diego County. It is distributed in Orange, Los Angeles, Riverside, and San Diego counties, and historically, San Bernardino County. There are 31 extant occurrences of this species, 41 occurrences of unknown status, and at least 31 or more extirpated occurrences. D. multicaulis is primarily found on heavy soils, usually clay, rocky hillsides, and sandstone outcrops. Because of the urbanization of habitat, the species is declining.

== Gallery ==
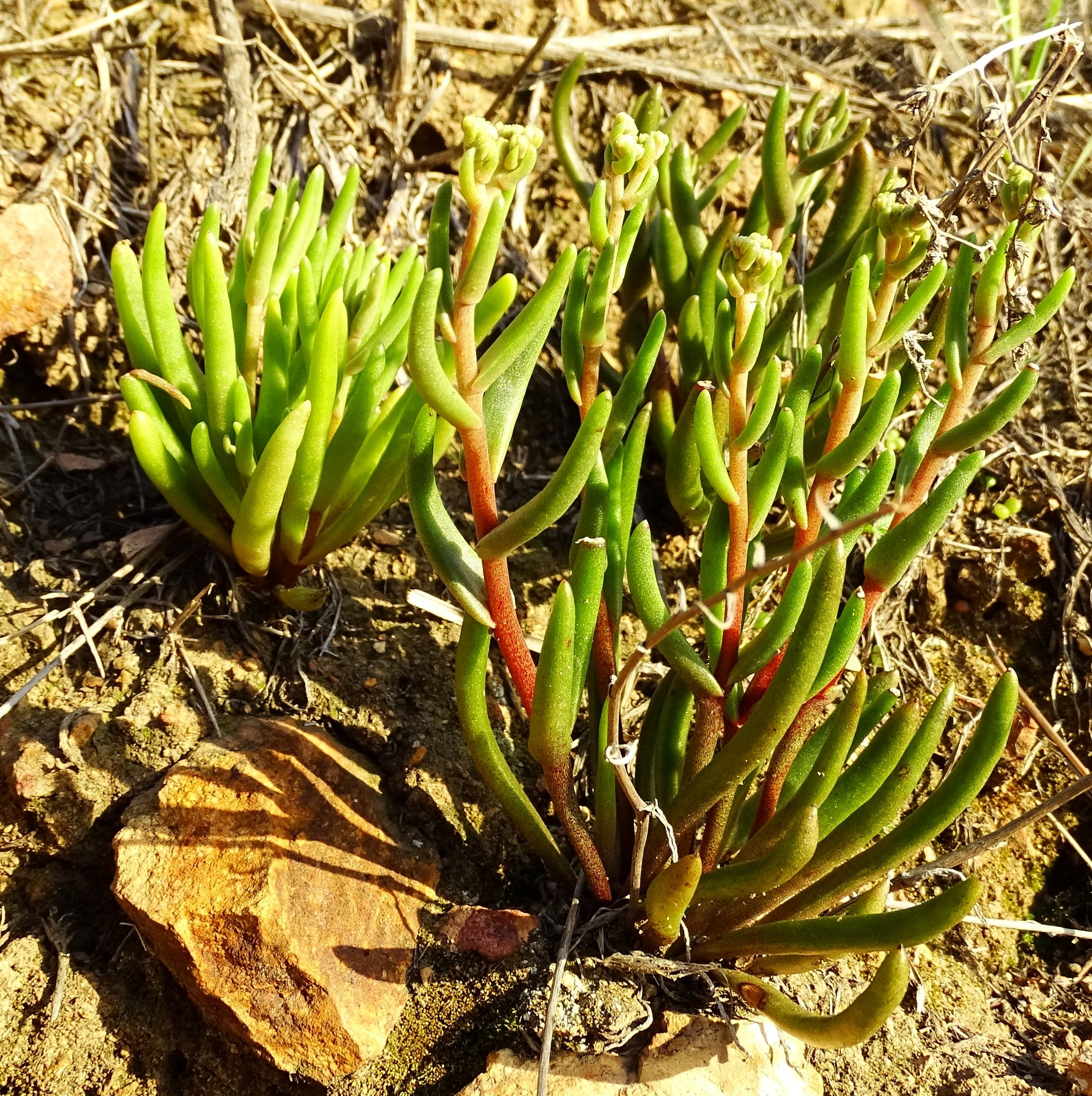
A cluster of plants

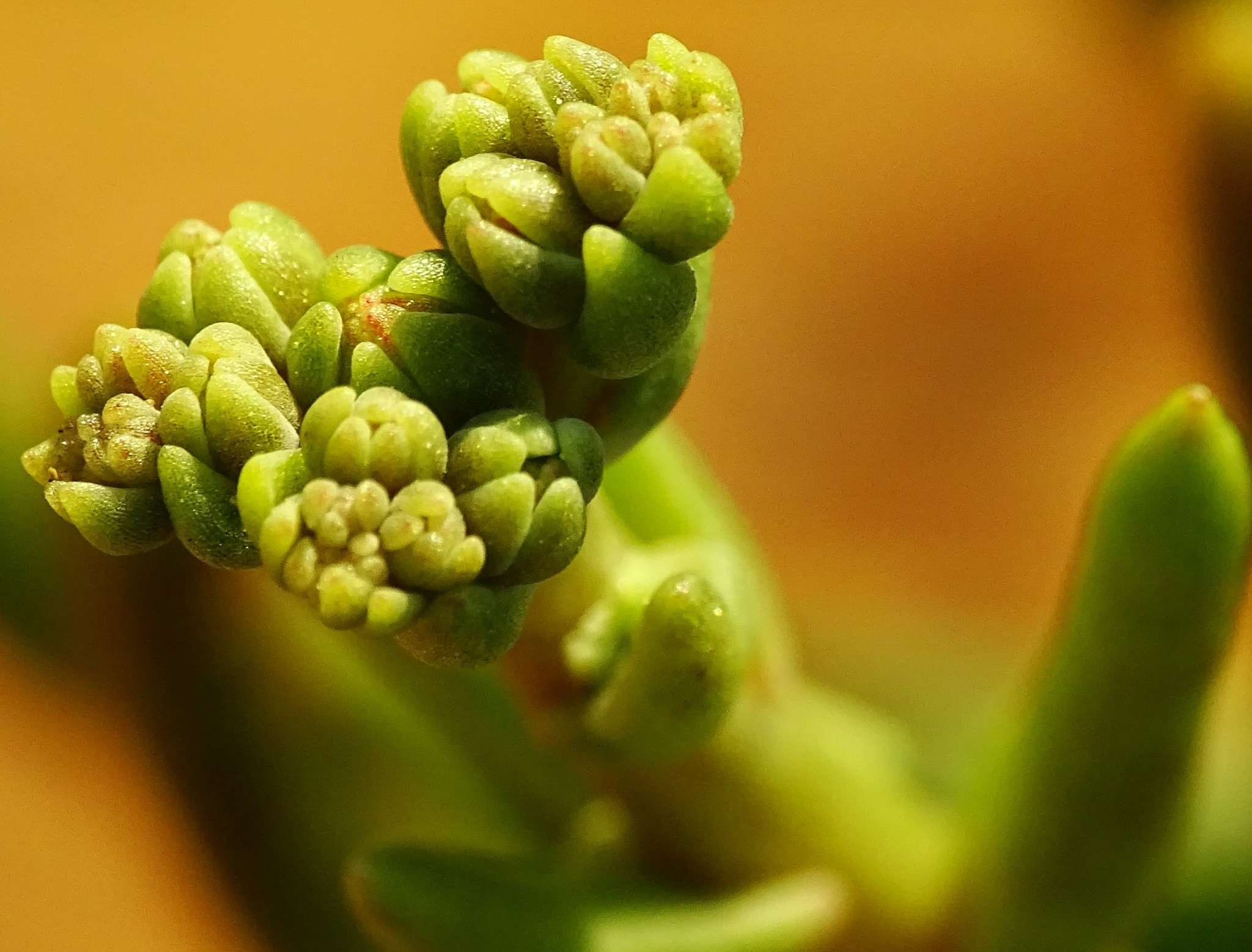
Detail of the developing buds

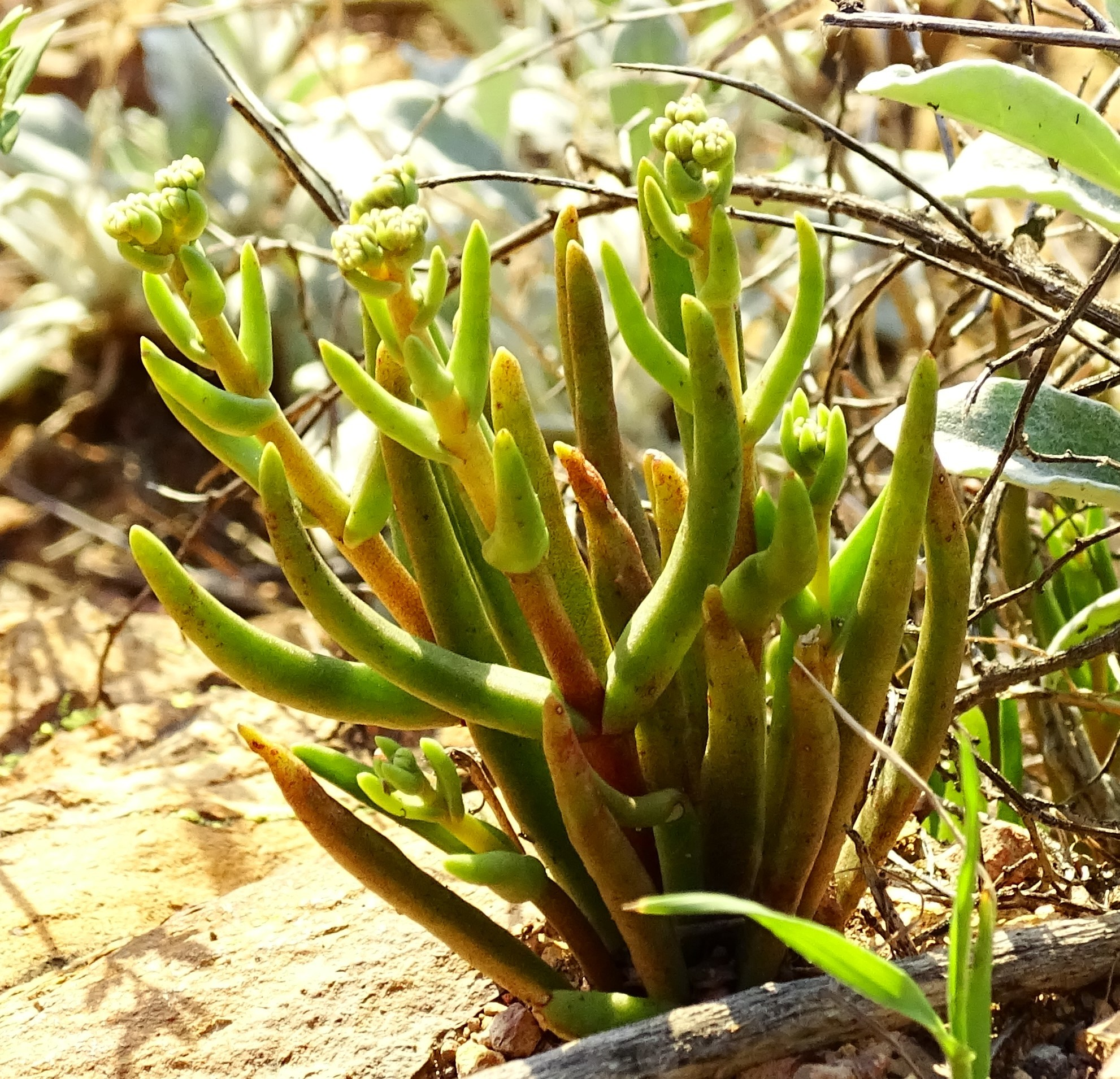
A plant with budding inflorescences

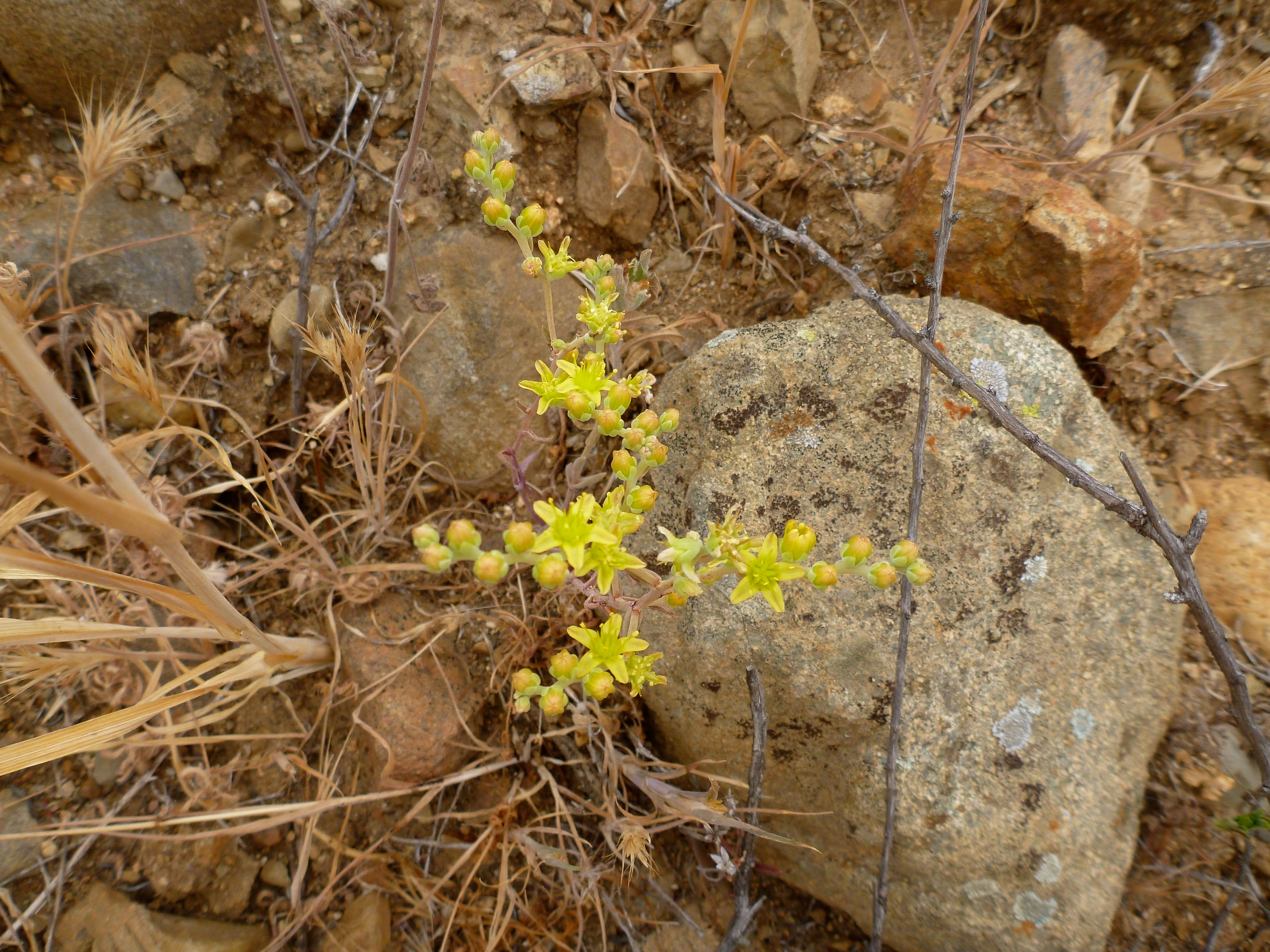
Flowers and buds

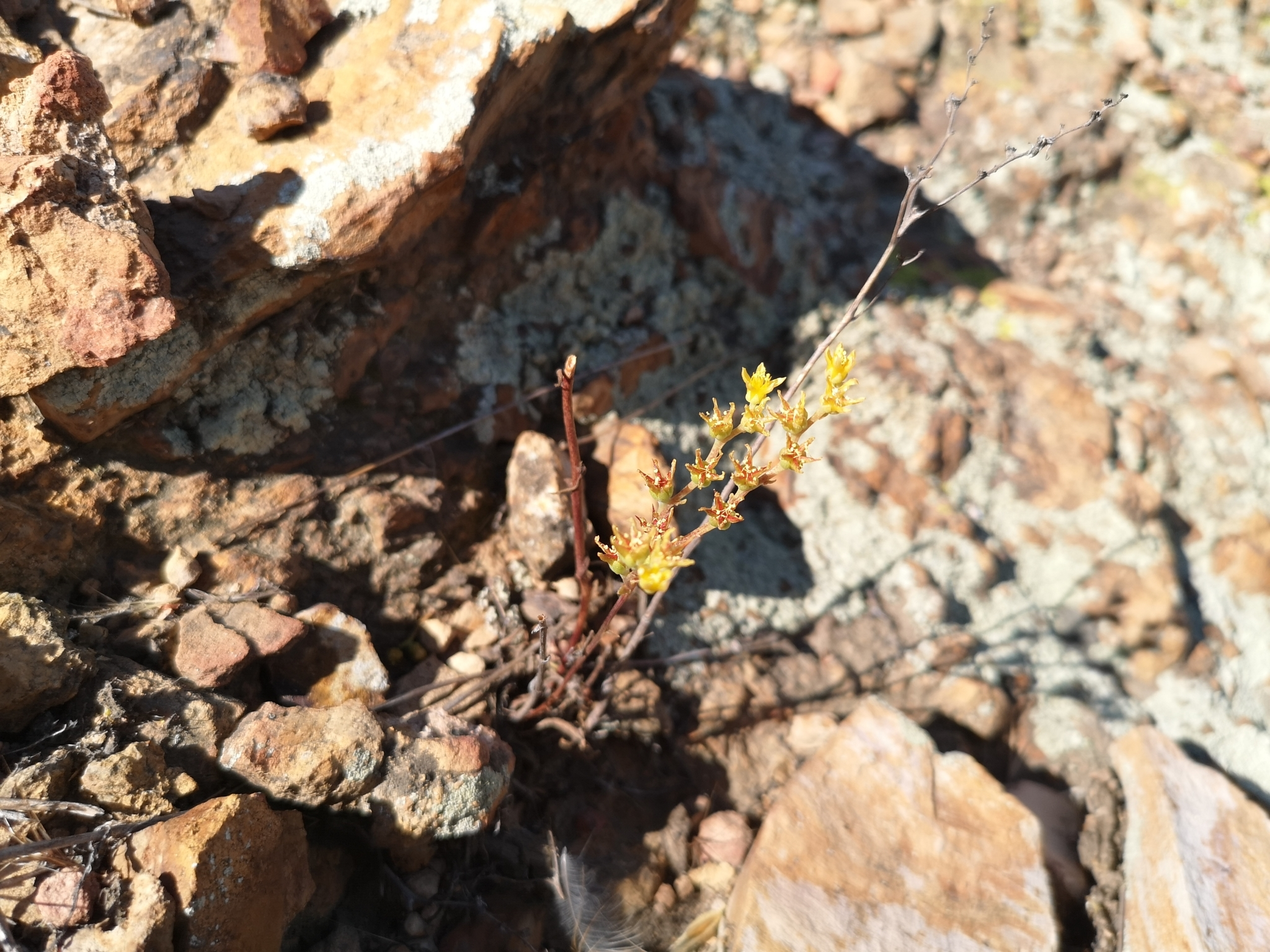
Flowering in habitat
