= Echeveria peacockii =

Echeveria peacockii is a scientific name that has been used for two plants:

- Dudleya pulverulenta, for which it is a synonym
- Echeveria desmetiana, for which it is an illegitimate name
