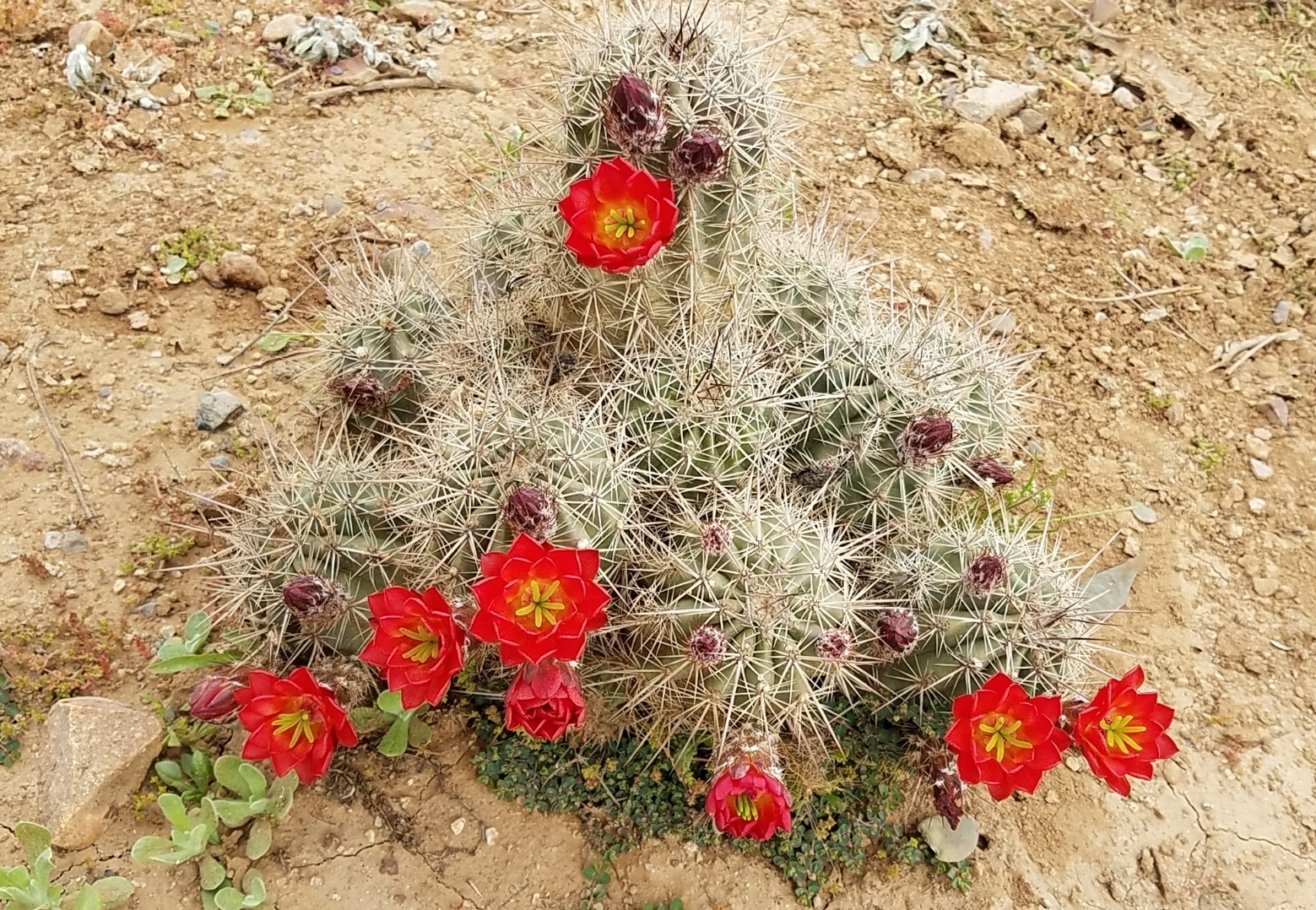

Conservation status
- Least Concern (IUCN 3.1)

Scientific classification
- Kingdom: Plantae
- Clade: Tracheophytes
- Clade: Angiosperms
- Clade: Eudicots
- Order: Caryophyllales
- Family: Cactaceae
- Subfamily: Cactoideae
- Genus: Echinocereus
- Species: E. pacificus

Binomial name
- Echinocereus pacificus (Engelm.) Britton & Rose 1922

Synonyms
- Cereus phoeniceus var. pacificus Engelm. 1886; Echinocereus polyacanthus subsp. pacificus (Engelm.) Breckw. 1996; Echinocereus polyacanthus var. pacificus (Engelm.) N.P.Taylor 1984; Echinocereus triglochidiatus var. pacificus (Engelm.) Bravo 1978; Echinocereus triglochidiatus subsp. pacificus (Engelm.) U.Guzmán 2003

= Echinocereus pacificus =

Species of cactus

Echinocereus pacificus is a species of cactus native to Mexico.

== Description ==
Echinocereus pacificus grows solitary, in clumps of 30–60 cm (12–24 in) in diameter containing around 100 stems. Stems are cylindrical to elongated shoots 5 to 6 cm (2.0 to 2.4 in) long, with 10 to 12 ribs and a 4 to 5, strong, upright central spine that is white or light gray with a darker tip, measuring 25 mm (0.98 in) in length. Additionally, there are 10 to 12 spreading, straight, whitish or grayish radial spines that are 5 to 10 mm (0.20 to 0.39 in) long. The flowers of are cup-shaped and deep red orange and 2.5 to 4 cm (0.98 to 1.57 in) in diameter. They appear in the upper half of the shoots. The spherical, fleshy fruits are spiny, 1.2 to 1.6 mm (0.047 to 0.063 in) long. Chromosome count is 4n=44

=== Subspecies ===
There are two recognized subspecies:

Image	Scientific name	Distribution
	Echinocereus pacificus subsp. mombergerianus (G.Frank) W.Blum, W.Rischer & Rutow	Mexico (N. Baja California)
	Echinocereus pacificus subsp. pacificus	Mexico (NW. Baja California)

== Distribution ==
Plants are found growing on granite slopes and xeric scrub in Baja California, Mexico at elevations around 110 to 2600 meters. Plants are found growing along with Adenostoma fasciculatum, Stipa speciosa, Arctostaphylos peninsularis, Dudleya pulverulenta, Lotus rigidus, Nolina microcarpa, Pinus monophylla, Rhamnus crocea, Opuntia phaeacantha, Cylindropuntia acanthocarpa, Pinus quadrifolia, Ferocactus viridescens and Malosma laurina.

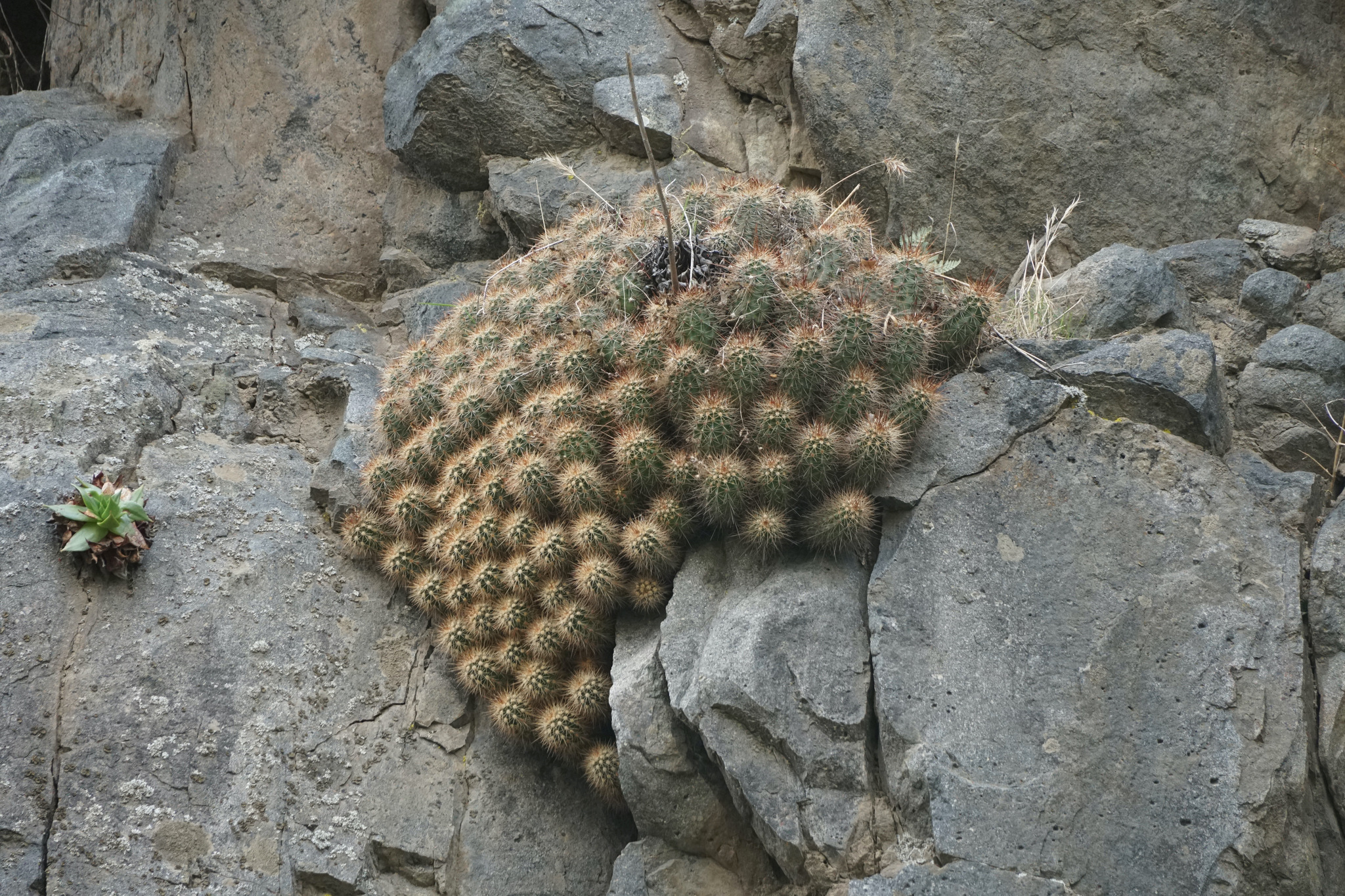
Echinocereus pacificus subsp. pacificus in Ensenada, Baja California, Mexico

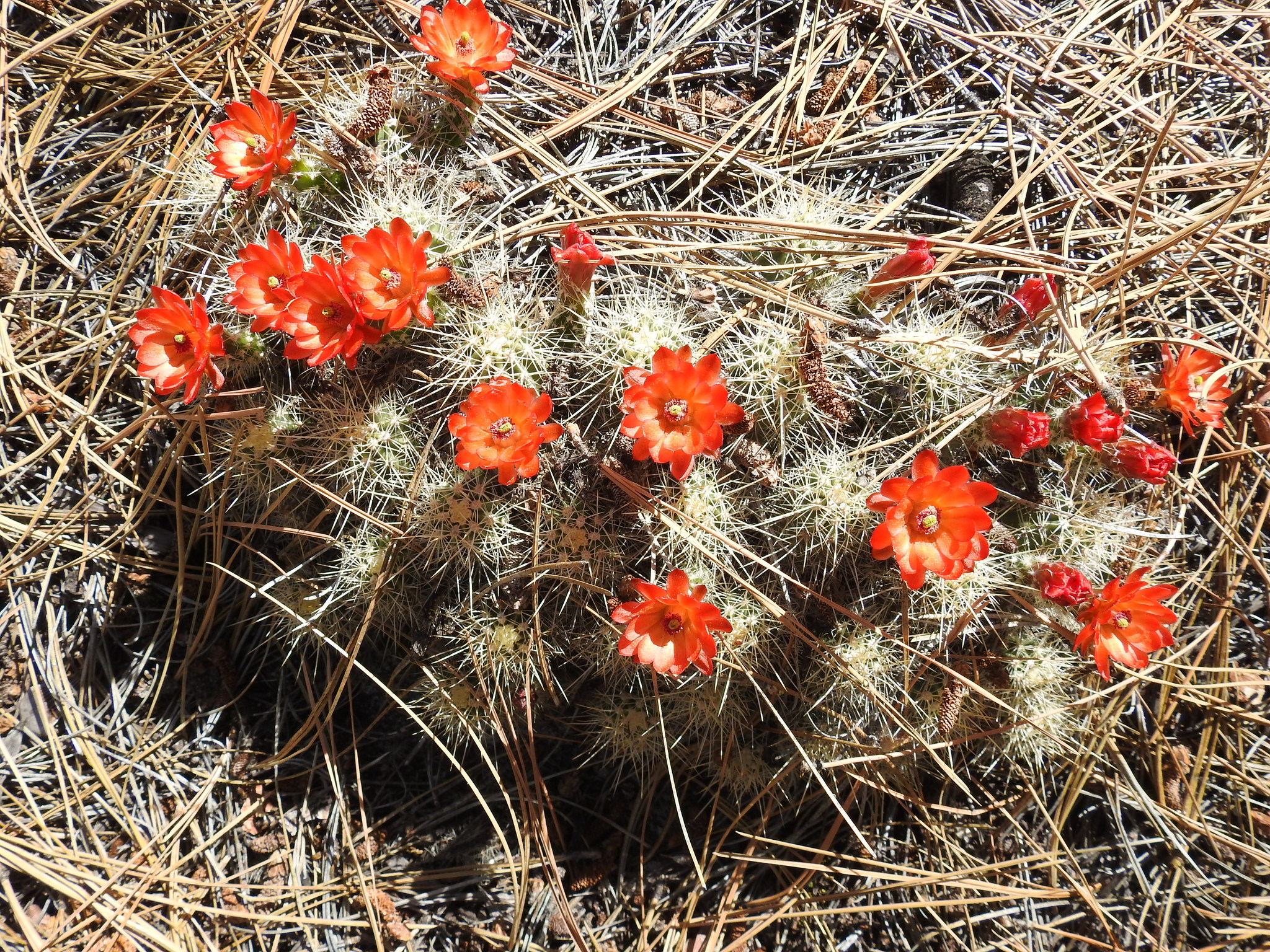
Echinocereus pacificus subsp. mombergerianus growing in San Pedro Mártir, Baja California, Mexico

== Taxonomy ==
The plant was first described by George Engelmann in 1886 as Cereus phoeniceus var. pacificus. It was elevated to a species in 1922 by Nathaniel Lord Britton and Joseph Nelson Rose.
