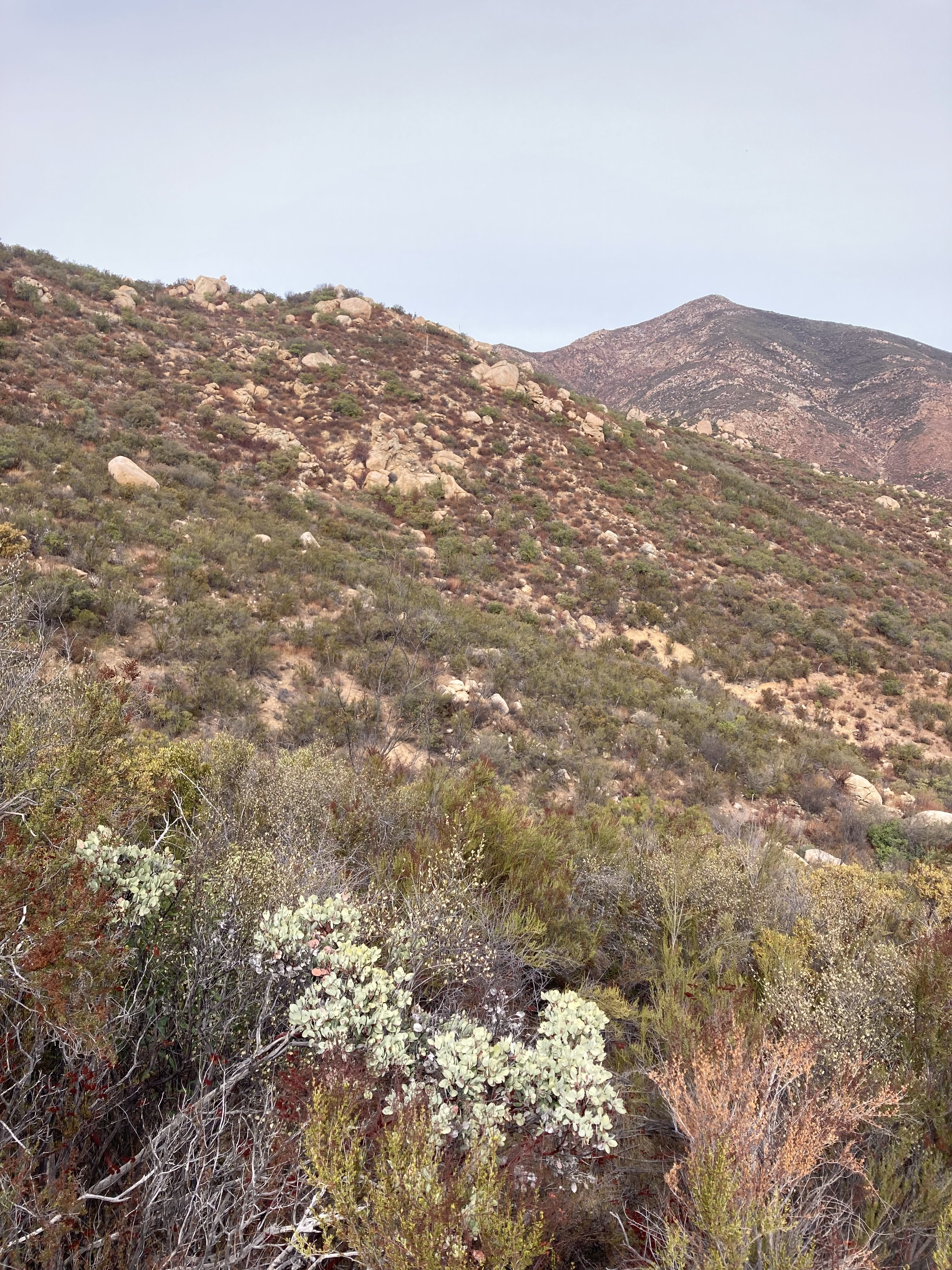
- Growing in chaparral habitat on the north slopes of Cerro Italia, elevation 620m

Scientific classification
- Kingdom: Plantae
- Clade: Tracheophytes
- Clade: Angiosperms
- Clade: Eudicots
- Clade: Asterids
- Order: Ericales
- Family: Ericaceae
- Genus: Arctostaphylos
- Species: A. incognita

Binomial name
- Arctostaphylos incognita J.E.Keeley, Massihi, J.Delgad. & Hirales

= Arctostaphylos incognita =

Species of manzanita

Arctostaphylos incognita, the Cerro Italia manzanita or Incognito manzanita, is a species of manzanita narrowly endemic to the vicinity of Cerro Italia in northern Baja California, where it grows in chaparral west of the town of Ejido Carmen Serdan.

== Description ==
Arctostaphylos incognita grows as a large shrub 1-4m in height, with blue-gray (glaucous) and hairless (glabrous) leaves. It is extremely similar to another Baja California endemic manzanita Arctostaphylos peninsularis, but has different fruit structure and does not overlap in range.

== Distribution and habitat ==
Arctostaphylos incognita only grows on rhyolitic soils near Cerro Italia in extreme northern Baja California at elevations of 300-700m. It has a very small range and has only been noted as far west as the vicinity of San Jose de la Zorra.
