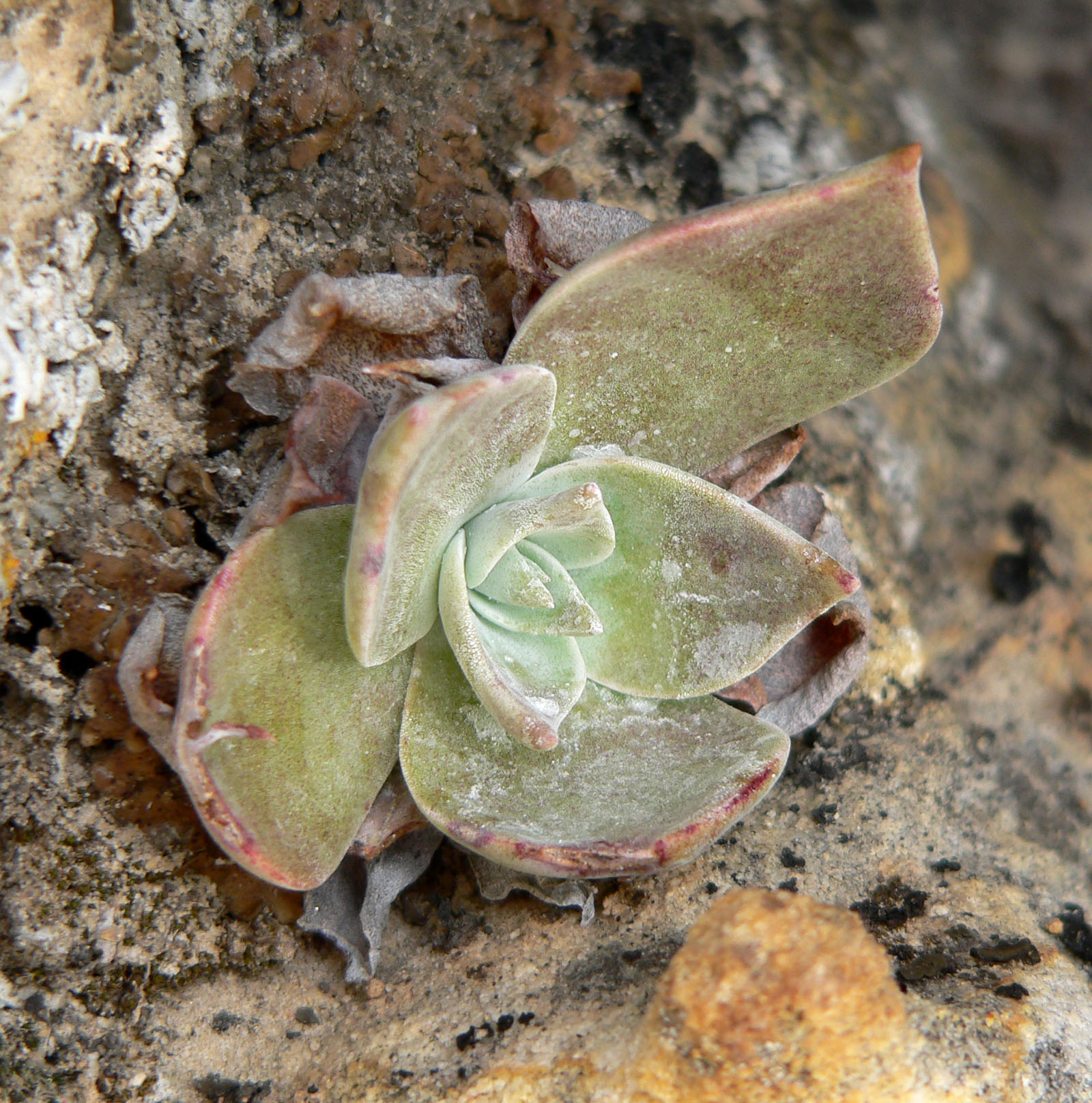

Conservation status
- Apparently Secure (NatureServe)

Scientific classification
- Kingdom: Plantae
- Clade: Tracheophytes
- Clade: Angiosperms
- Clade: Eudicots
- Order: Saxifragales
- Family: Crassulaceae
- Genus: Dudleya
- Species: D. arizonica

Binomial name
- Dudleya arizonica Rose
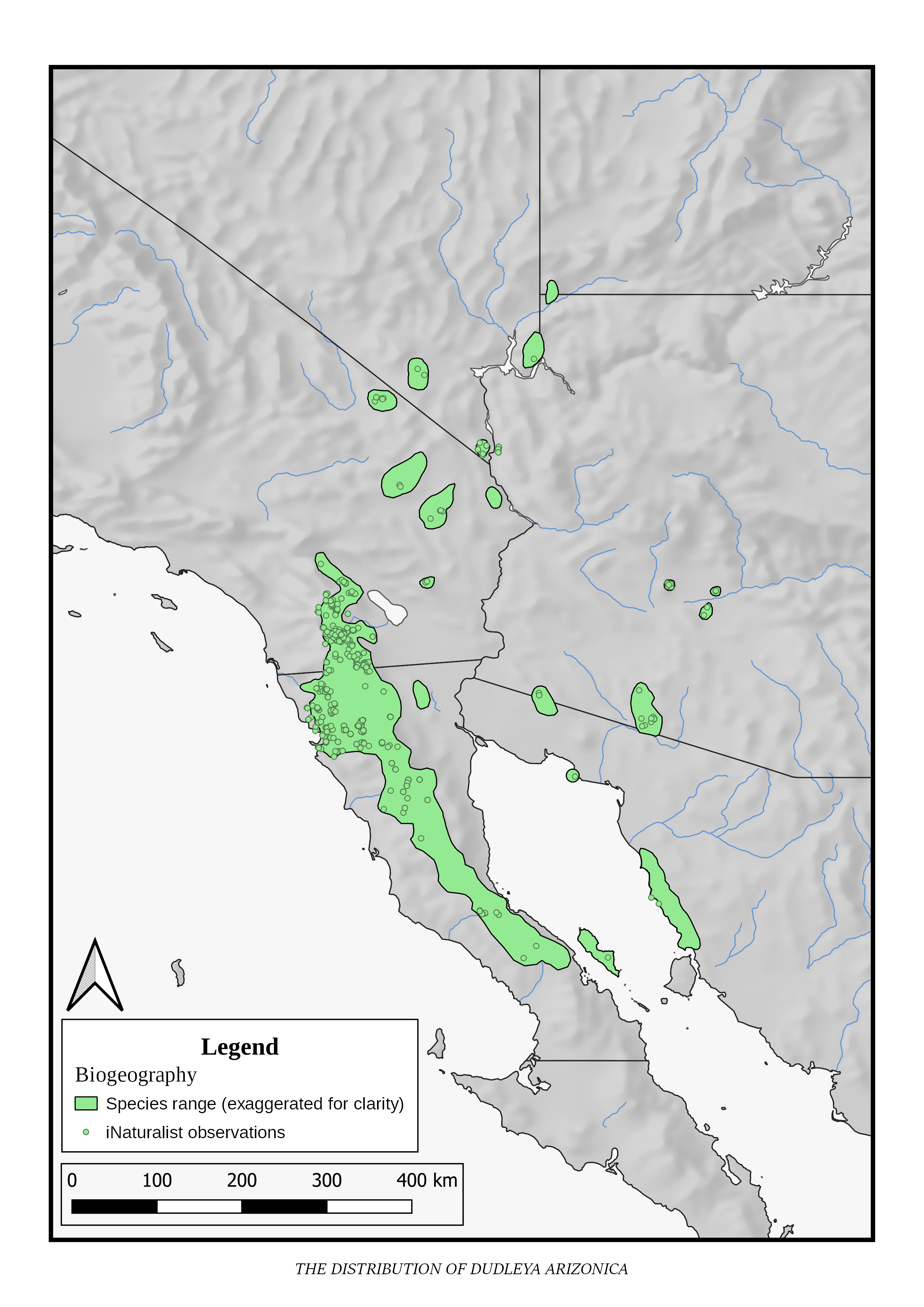
- Natural range of Dudleya arizonica

Synonyms
- Echeveria arizonica (Rose) Kearney & Peebles; Dudleya pulverulenta ssp. arizonica (Rose) Moran; Echeveria pulverulenta ssp. arizonica (Rose) Clokey; Dudleya pulverulenta var. arizonica (Rose) Welsh

= Dudleya arizonica =

Species of perennial

Dudleya arizonica is a species of perennial succulent plant commonly known as the Arizona chalk dudleya and the Arizona liveforever. A member of the genus Dudleya, this species is characterized by long, red flowers that adorn a waxy rosette of succulent leaves. It resembles a reduced desert form of the more coastal chalk dudleya, Dudleya pulverulenta, but differs in its smaller stature, lower number of leaves, and orientation of the flowers. Native to the southwestern United States and northwestern Mexico, it is widespread in range, but is primarily found in scattered, widely separated localities. It can be found as far west as coastal Ensenada to the desolate desert ranges of Nevada. It is one of two species of Dudleya that occur in Arizona, the other being Dudleya saxosa subsp. collomiae, and is the only species on mainland Mexico and in Utah.

== Description ==
=== Morphology ===
A Dudleya of moderate size, starting from the base, the caudex is 1 to 4 cm wide, with one or sometimes more rosettes nestled on top, with the average rosette size ranging from 10 to 25 cm wide. The rosette is composed of 15 to 30 generally farinose or greenish-white leaves, which are usually seated upright in the center of the rosette, either staying upright and forming a cup-shaped rosette or becoming flat away from the center. The leaves are 5 to 15 cm long, 1 to 5 mm wide, and 2 to 4 mm thick, shaped oblong to oblong-obovate, with a long-acuminate tip. Some leaves may have a bronze coloration, and as the plant ages, the foliage may wrinkle and shrink.

The peduncle is 15 to 60 cm in height, 2 to 6 mm thick, with 30 to 45 close-set bracts ascending in a spiral fashion around the floral stem. In shape, the bracts are long-triangular, 2.5 to 3.8 cm long and 1.5 to 1.9 cm wide. 3 to 6 branches split off from the peduncle, each roughly 4 to 27 cm long. The flower buds emerge near-horizontal to upright, and remain erect after they develop. The flowers are suspended on pedicels 5 to 15 mm long, with red or apricot-yellow petals.

== Taxonomy ==
=== Classification ===
The genus Dudleya has complex and unfinished taxonomy; thus, this plant is sometimes regarded as a subspecies of Dudleya pulverulenta, or as a species in its own right.

The main differences in morphology between the Dudleya arizonica and Dudleya pulverulenta are:

- Stem: The caudex of Dudleya arizonica is typically 1 to 4 cm wide, as opposed to 4 to 9 cm wide in D. pulverulenta.
- Leaves: D. arizonica usually has 15 to 25 leaves, compared to 40 to 60 leaves in D. pulverulenta. Leaves in D. arizonica are also much smaller, ranging from 5 to 15 cm in contrast to D. pulverulenta's leaves that can become up to 25 cm long.
- Flowers: The pedicels in D. arizonica are shorter compared to D. pulverulenta. However, the most noticeable difference is that D. pulverulenta has drooping, pendant flowers, whilst D. arizonica possesses, erect, upright flowers.

== Distribution and habitat ==
Dudleya arizonica is native to much of the desert southwestern United States, along with northwestern Mexico. It is native to Arizona, Baja California, California, Nevada, Utah and Sonora.

In the United States, it is found throughout central and western Arizona, the desert southwest of California up into the eastern face of the Peninsular Ranges, southern Nevada, and reaching a disjunct population in the Beaver Dam Mountains of Utah. The occurrences in Utah are only found on limestone outcrops, and are threatened by collecting, recreation and urban growth.

In Baja California, it is found in the Peninsular Ranges continuing from California into the Guadalupe Valley, but not reaching the coast, extending down the desert on sky islands until it reaches the southern limit of Ángel de la Guarda Island. In Sonora, it exists on the desert coast from the Colorado River delta and Puerto Peñasco to just north of Tiburón Island.

== Gallery ==
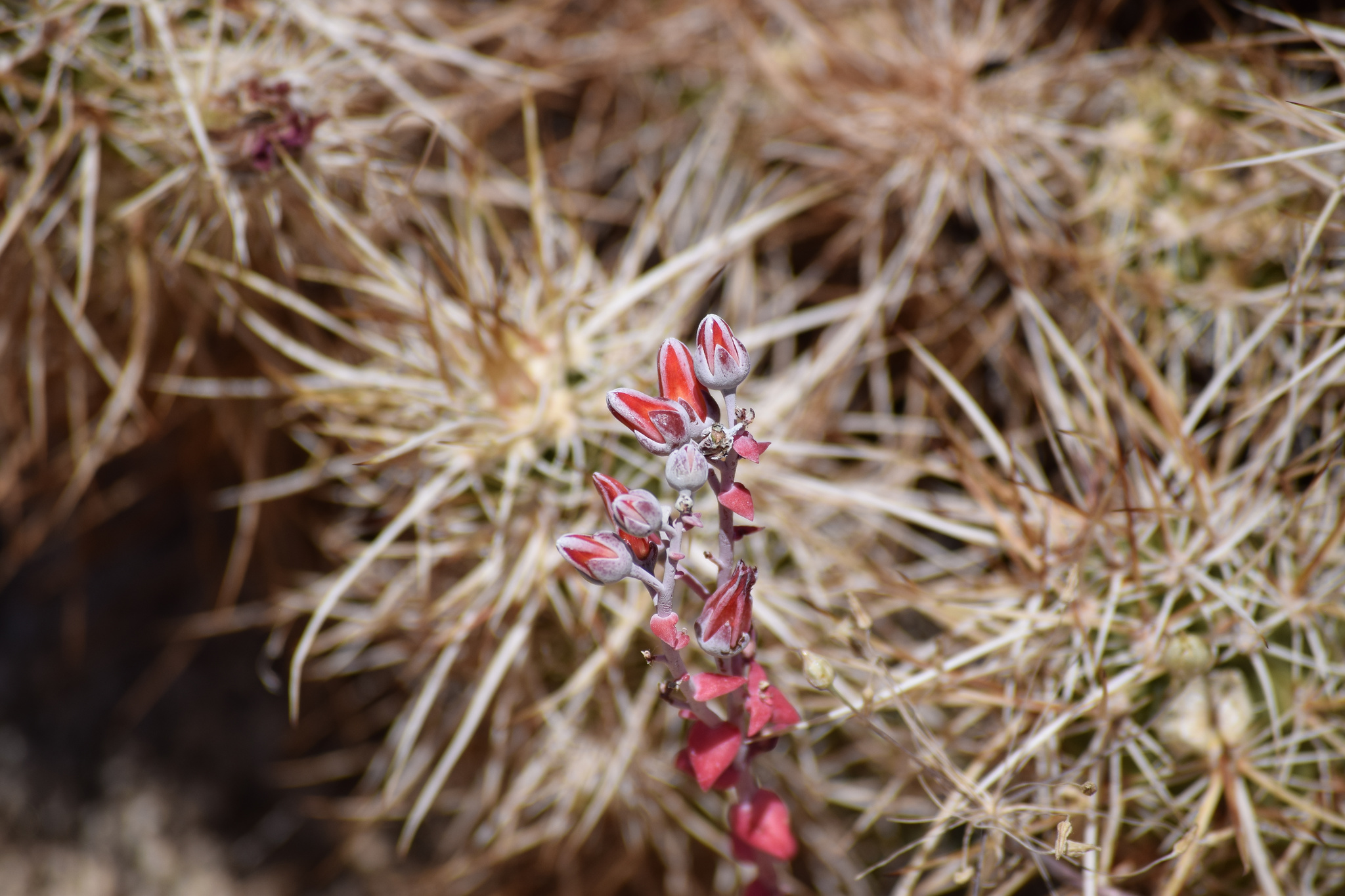
The flowers and the inflorescence

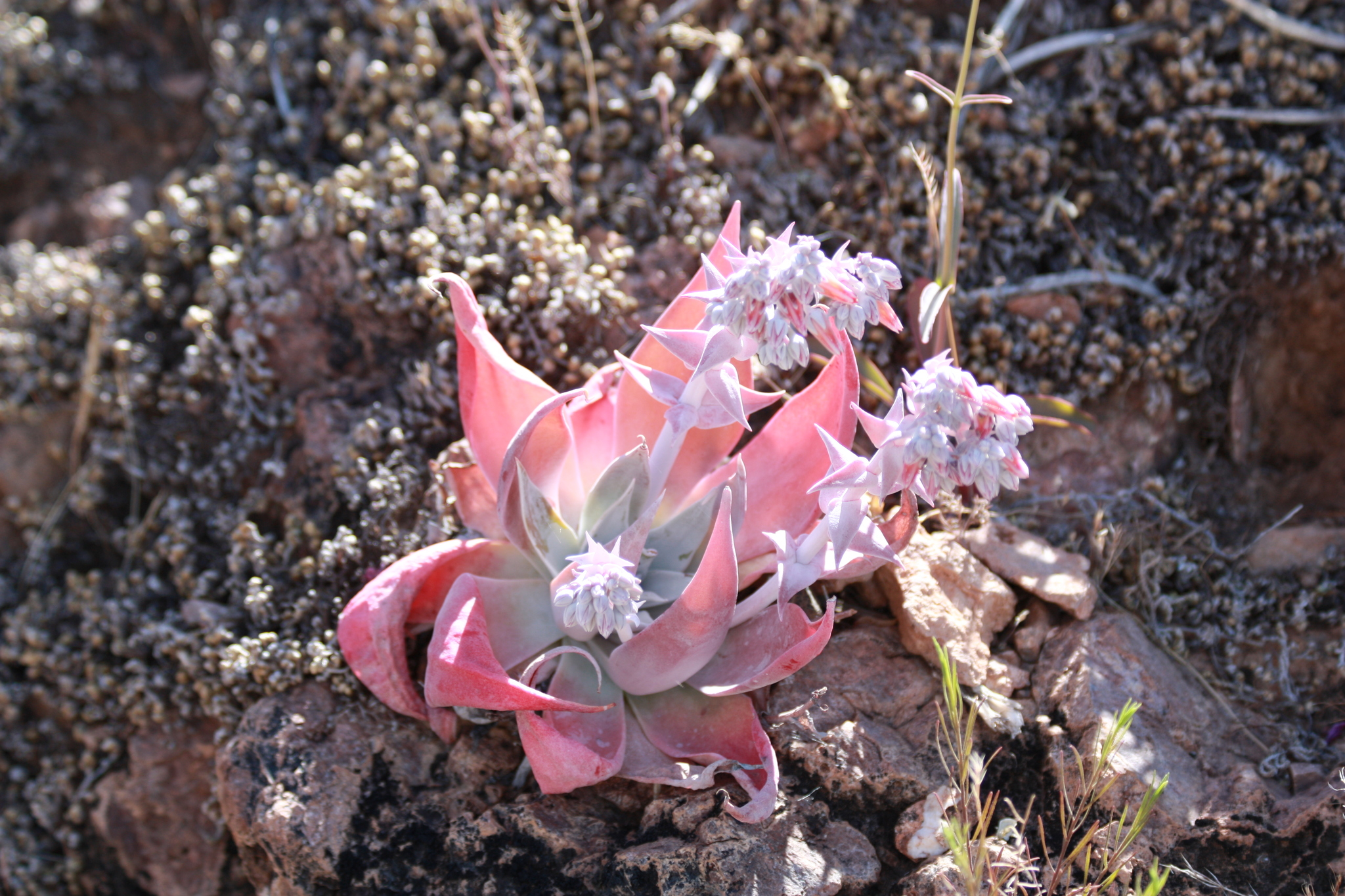
Flowering in habitat

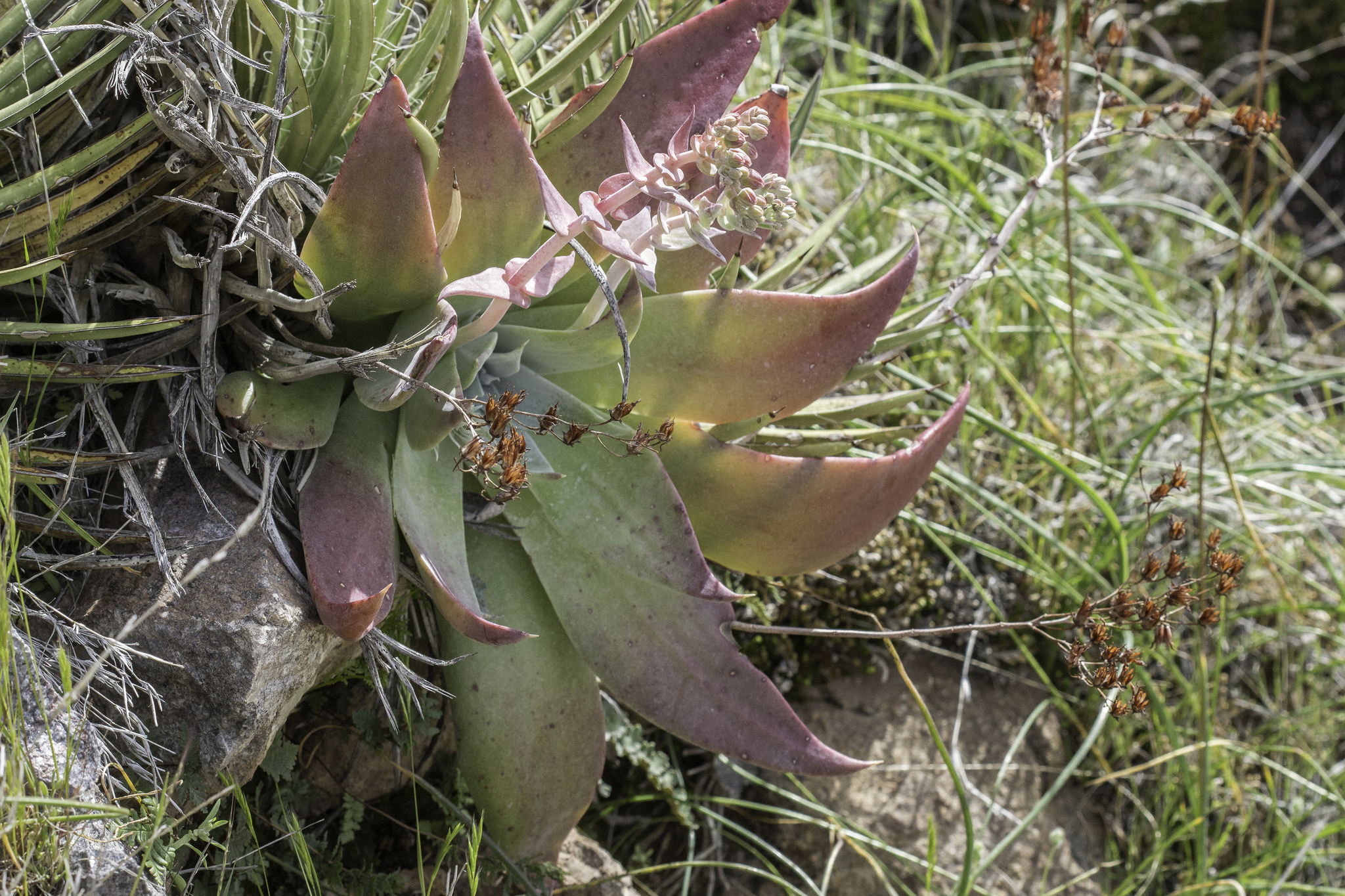
With old flowers and newly emerging stalk

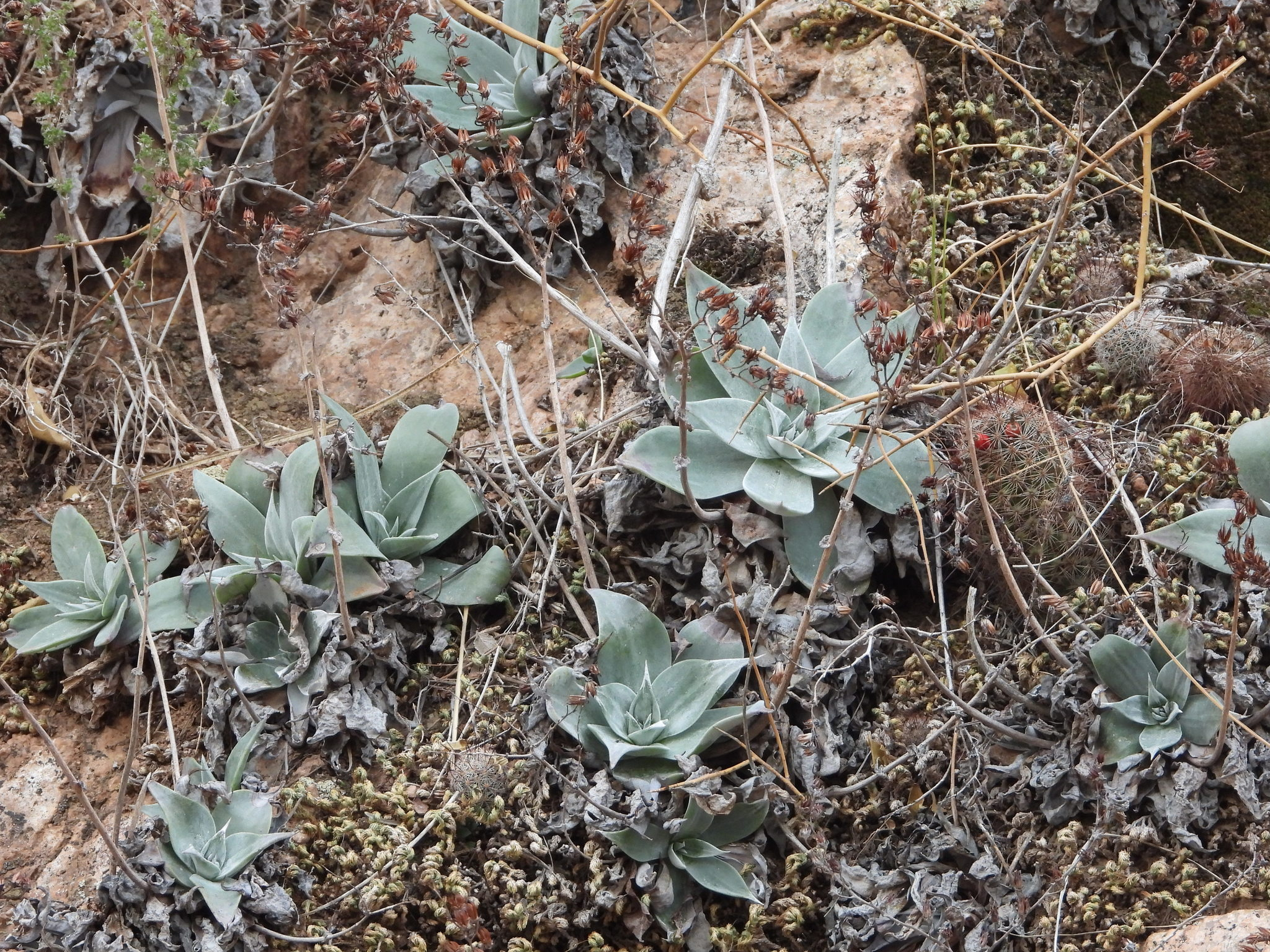
A group of plants, not in flower

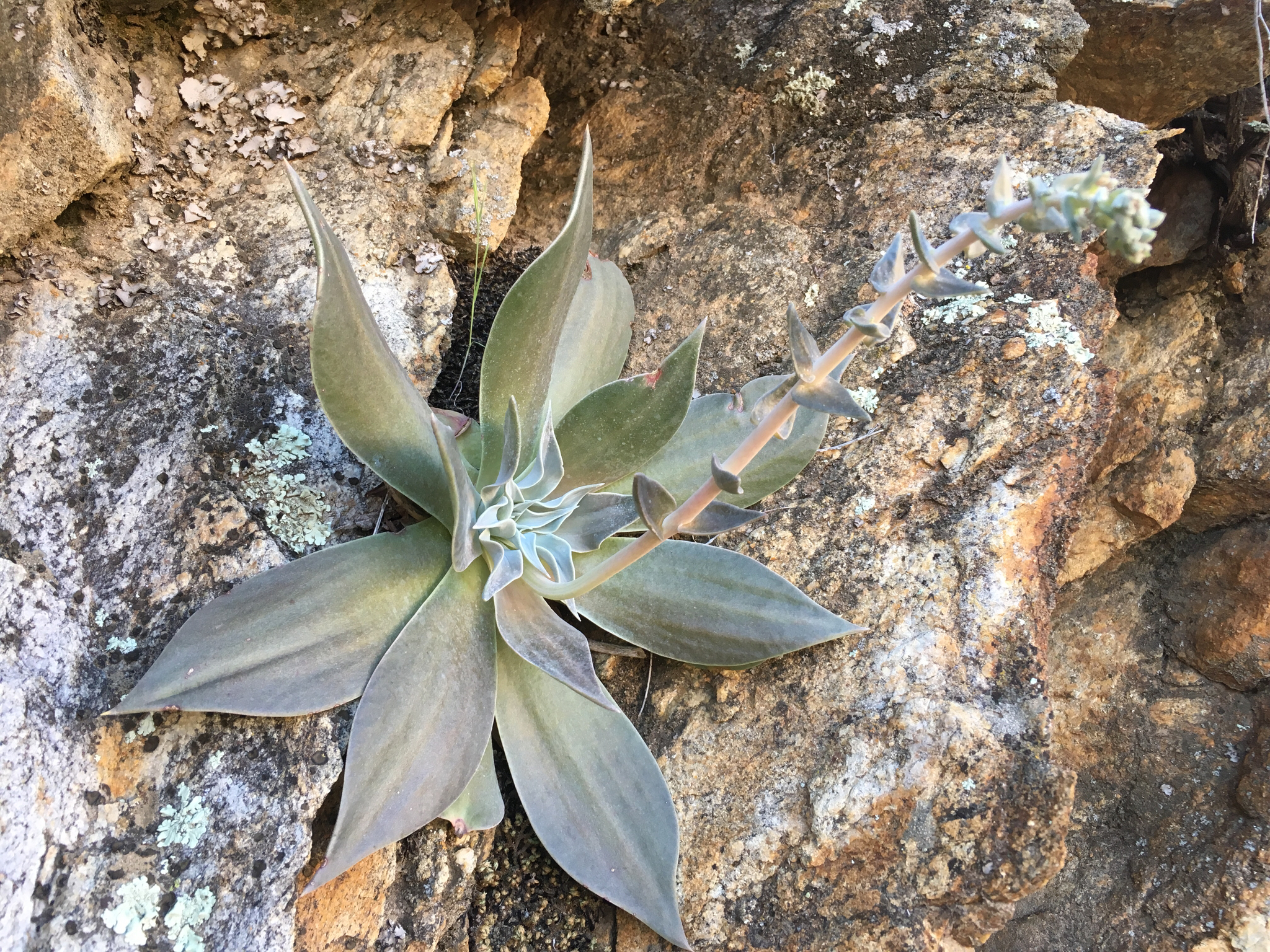
In San Diego County, with growing inflorescence

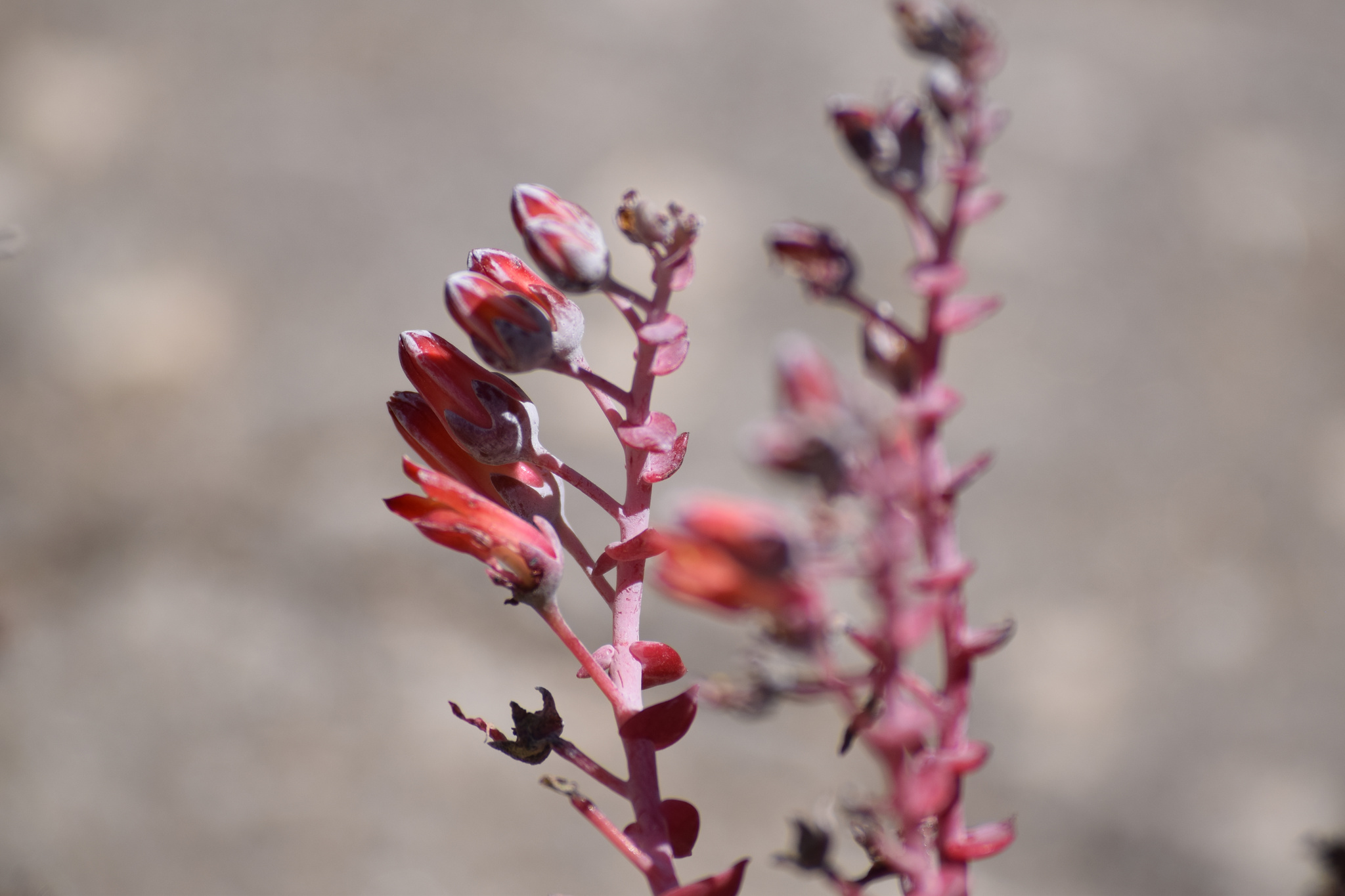
The flowers on their branch. Compared to Dudleya pulverulenta, the flowers are held erect, rather than held downwards

== See also ==
- Dudleya anthonyi
- Dudleya brittonii
- Dudleya pulverulenta
