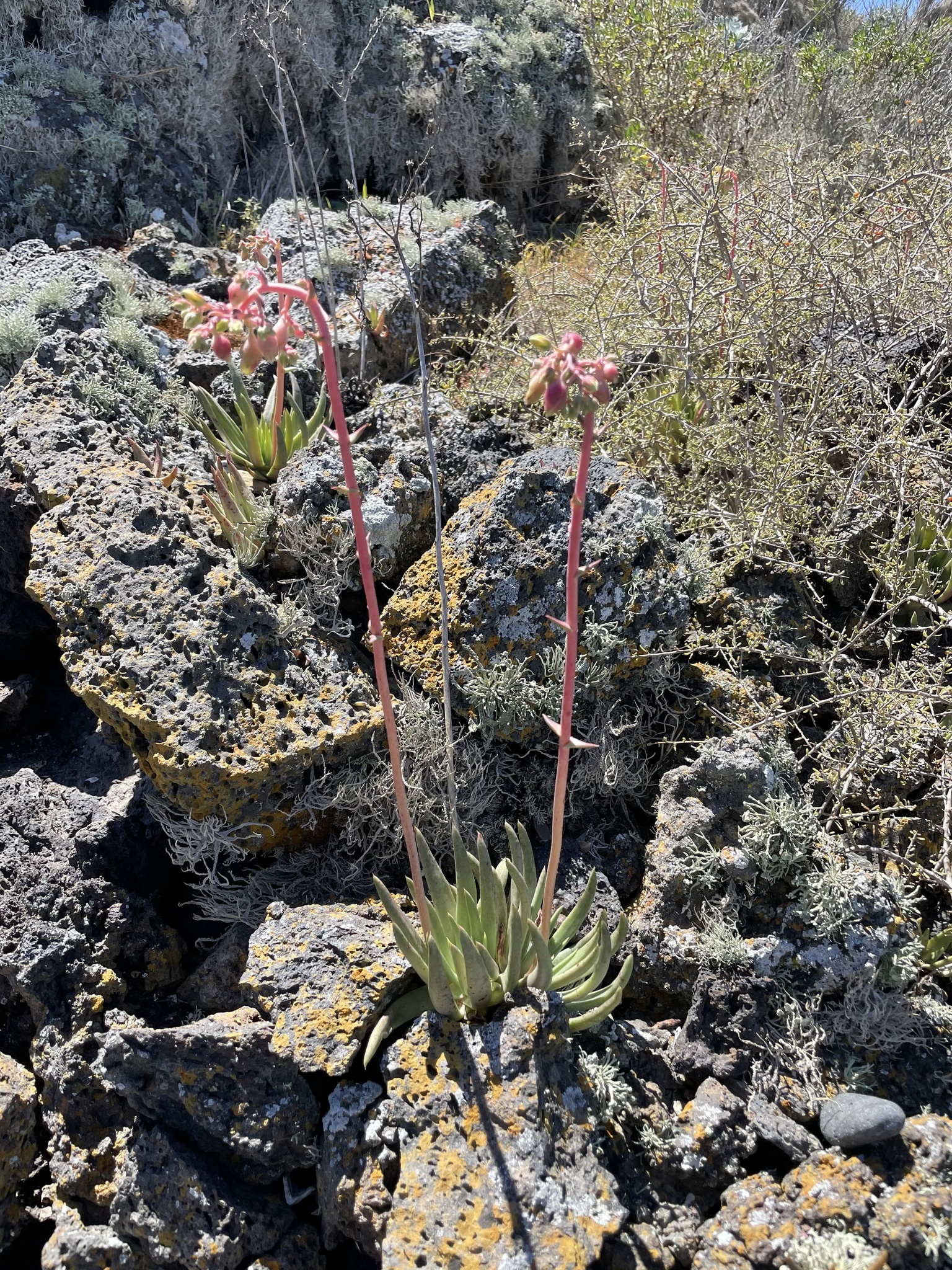

Scientific classification
- Kingdom: Plantae
- Clade: Tracheophytes
- Clade: Angiosperms
- Clade: Eudicots
- Order: Saxifragales
- Family: Crassulaceae
- Genus: Dudleya
- Species: D. cultrata

Binomial name
- Dudleya cultrata Rose

Synonyms
- Cotyledon cultrata Fedde, 1904; Echeveria cultrata (Rose) A. Berger

= Dudleya cultrata =

Species of succulent

Dudleya cultrata is a species of perennial succulent in the family Crassulaceae commonly known as the knife-leaved liveforever or the maritime succulent liveforever. This species is characterized by oblong, narrow green leaves and flowers with pale yellow petals that bloom from April to June. Although similar to Dudleya ingens, this species is most often seen growing sympatric with the larger, wax-covered Dudleya anthonyi. It is native to Baja California, occurring on the coast from Punta Colonet and San Quintin to El Rosario.

== Description ==
Like most other evergreen Dudleya, this species grows as a leaf succulent with a basal rosette of leaves on top of a caudex. This species branches dichotomously, giving multiple rosettes in orders of 2. This species has noticeably less leaves than the coastal form of Dudleya ingens, having only up to 25 leaves, and is similar in appearance to the inland form of Dudleya ingens. The leaves are green, and lack any glaucousness or wax. The flowering stalks may be up to 40 cm (16 in) tall, and are colored reddish or greenish. The flowers have pale-yellow to yellow petals that appear from April to June. Like other members of the subgenus Dudleya, the petals are connate, forming a tube.

=== Morphology ===
The caudex ranges from 2–4 cm (0.79–1.57 in) in thickness, and elongate to 20 cm (7.9 in) long, branching to form clusters of up to 10 rosettes. The rosettes themselves are 3–8 cm (1.2–3.1 in) in diameter, with about 20–30 leaves. The leaves are shaped oblong, with the sides parallel or tapering from the base. The leaves measure 5–13 cm (2.0–5.1 in) in length, 10–15 mm (0.39–0.59 in) in width, and are 3–5 mm (0.12–0.20 in) thick, flat on the upper surface but convex on the lower surface. The margins are acute in the lower fourth of the leaf, but rounded above, the apex sub-terete. The base of the leaf is 1.5–3 cm (0.59–1.18 in) wide, and 2–3 mm (0.079–0.118 in) high.

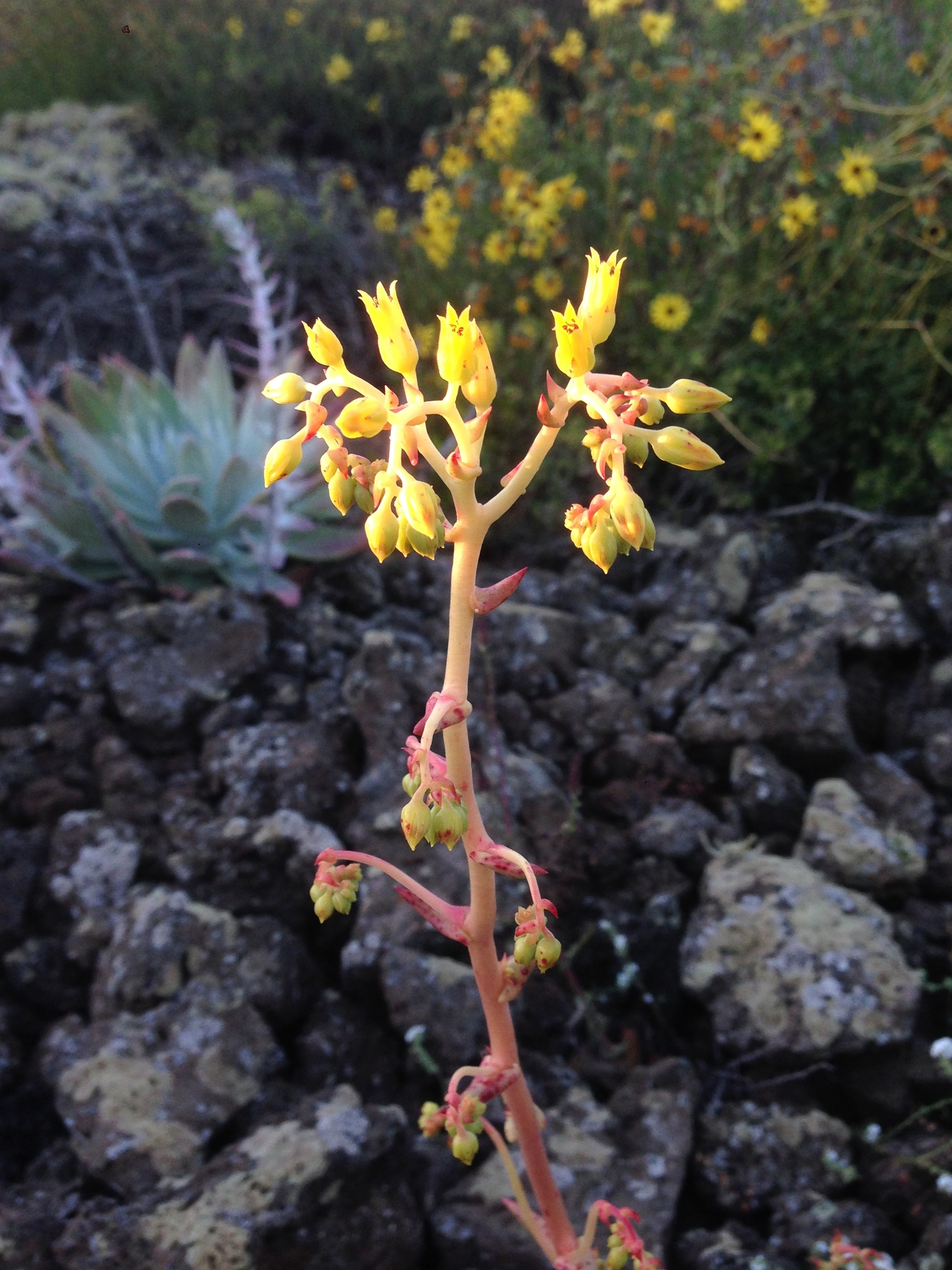
Dudleya cultrata inflorescence with Dudleya anthonyi in the background.

The floral stems are 20–40 cm (7.9–15.7 in) tall, and 3–5 mm (0.12–0.20 in) thick, with about 5–20 cauline leaves. The floral stem is bare of these leaves in the lower 5–15 cm (2.0–5.9 in). The cauline leaves are positioned horizontal to ascending, shaped triangular and acute, the lowermost being about 1–2 cm (0.39–0.79 in) long and 5 mm (0.20 in) wide. The inflorescence consists of about 3 ascending branches, which may in turn rebranch once. The terminal branches (cincinni) are 6–25 cm (2.4–9.8 in) long, with 6–20 flowers held on pedicels. The pedicels are erect, the lowermost ones 5–12 mm (0.20–0.47 in) long.

The calyx is 5–6 mm (0.20–0.24 in) wide, 4.5–6 mm (0.18–0.24 in) high, and rounded to tapering below. The calyx segments are shaped triangular, acute, 3.5–5 mm (0.14–0.20 in) long, and 2.5–3.5 mm (0.098–0.138 in) wide. The petals are pale yellow, shaped elliptic, acute, 10–13 mm (0.39–0.51 in) long, and about 3 mm (0.12 in) wide, connate 3–5 mm (0.12–0.20 in). The anthers are orange. The carpels are erect.

== Taxonomy ==
This species bears a close resemblance to the inland form of Dudleya ingens, differing in its coastal habit and more yellowish flowers. It is a tetraploid relative to the basic chromosome number of the genus, with a gametic chromosome count of n=34.

== Distribution and habitat ==
Dudleya cultrata is typically found abundantly on the coast around San Quintin Bay in Baja California, and also on San Martin Island. Its northern range is near Colonet, and it can be found south in the El Rosario coast as well. On San Martin, D. cultrata hybridizes with D. anthonyi.

== Gallery ==
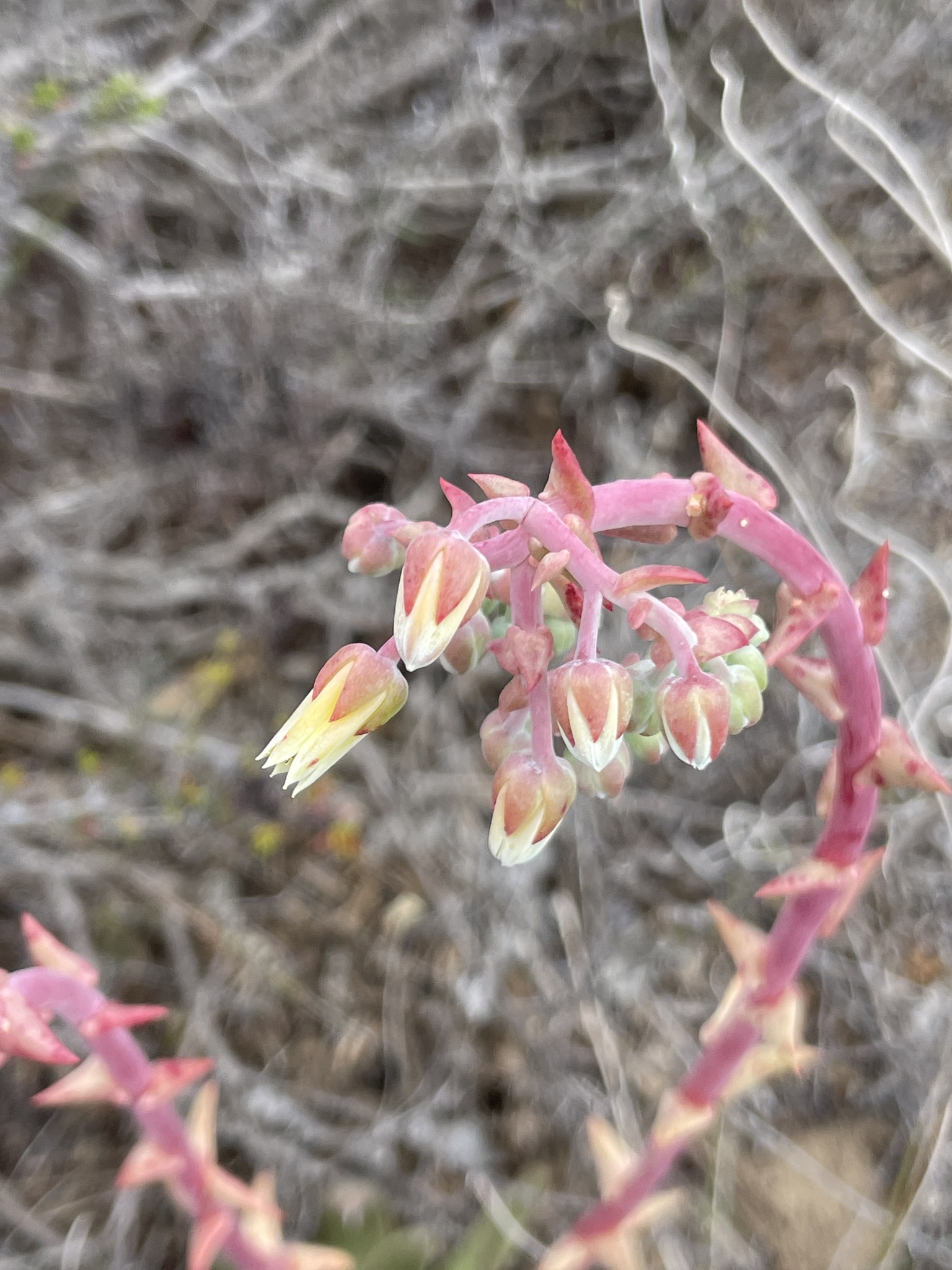
Detail of one of the terminal branches on the inflorescence.

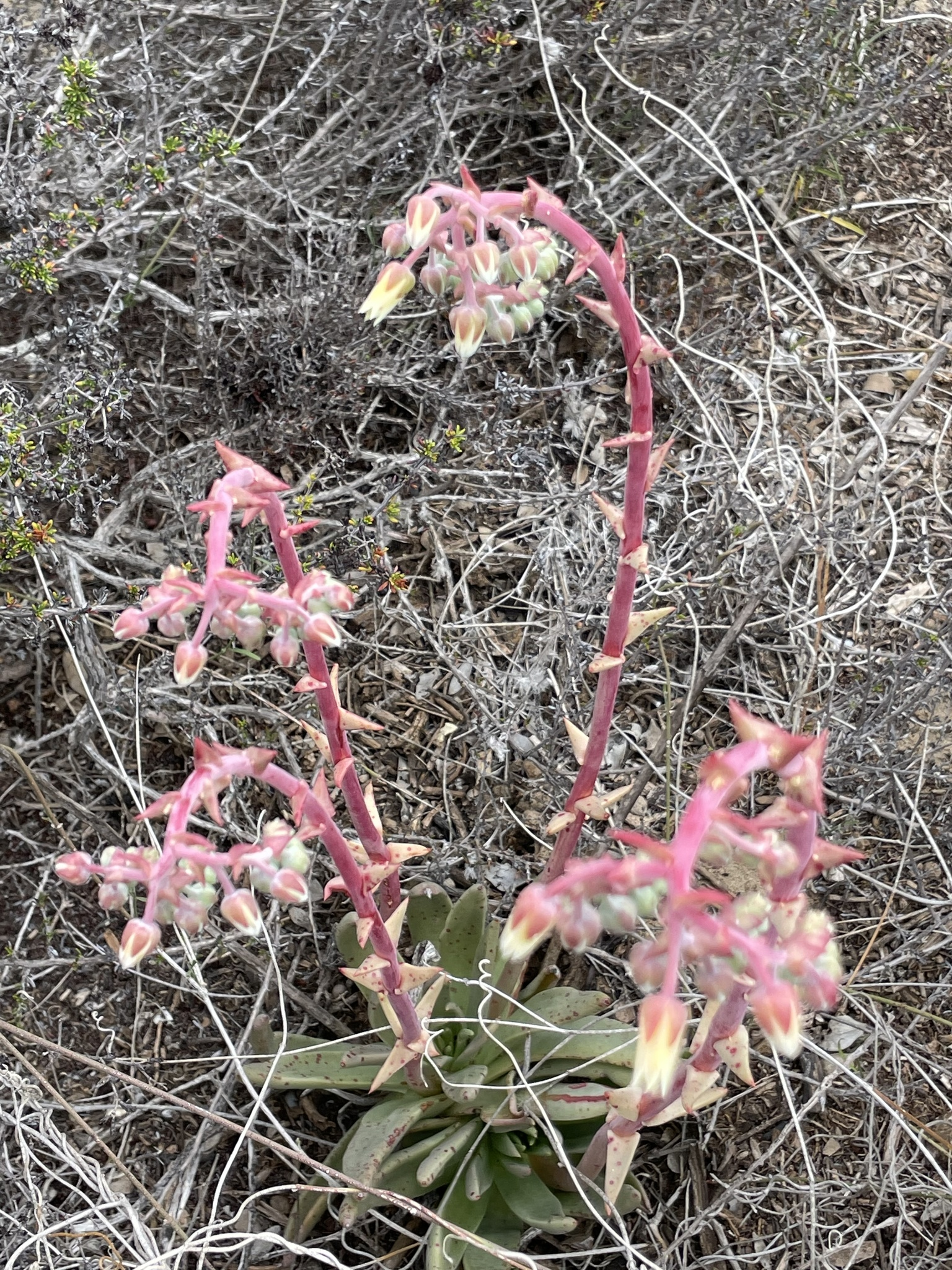
Plant with inflorescences

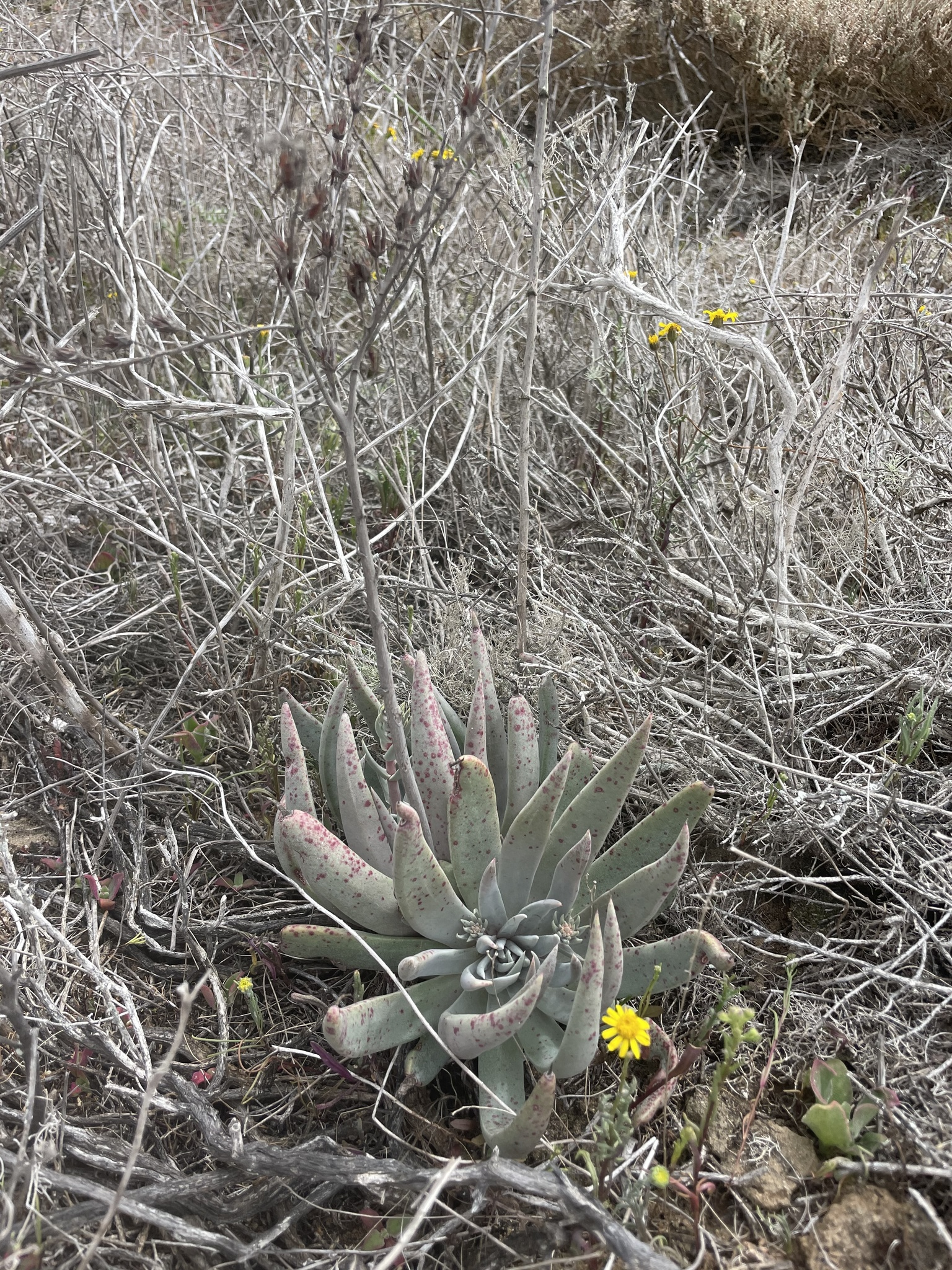
In habitat
