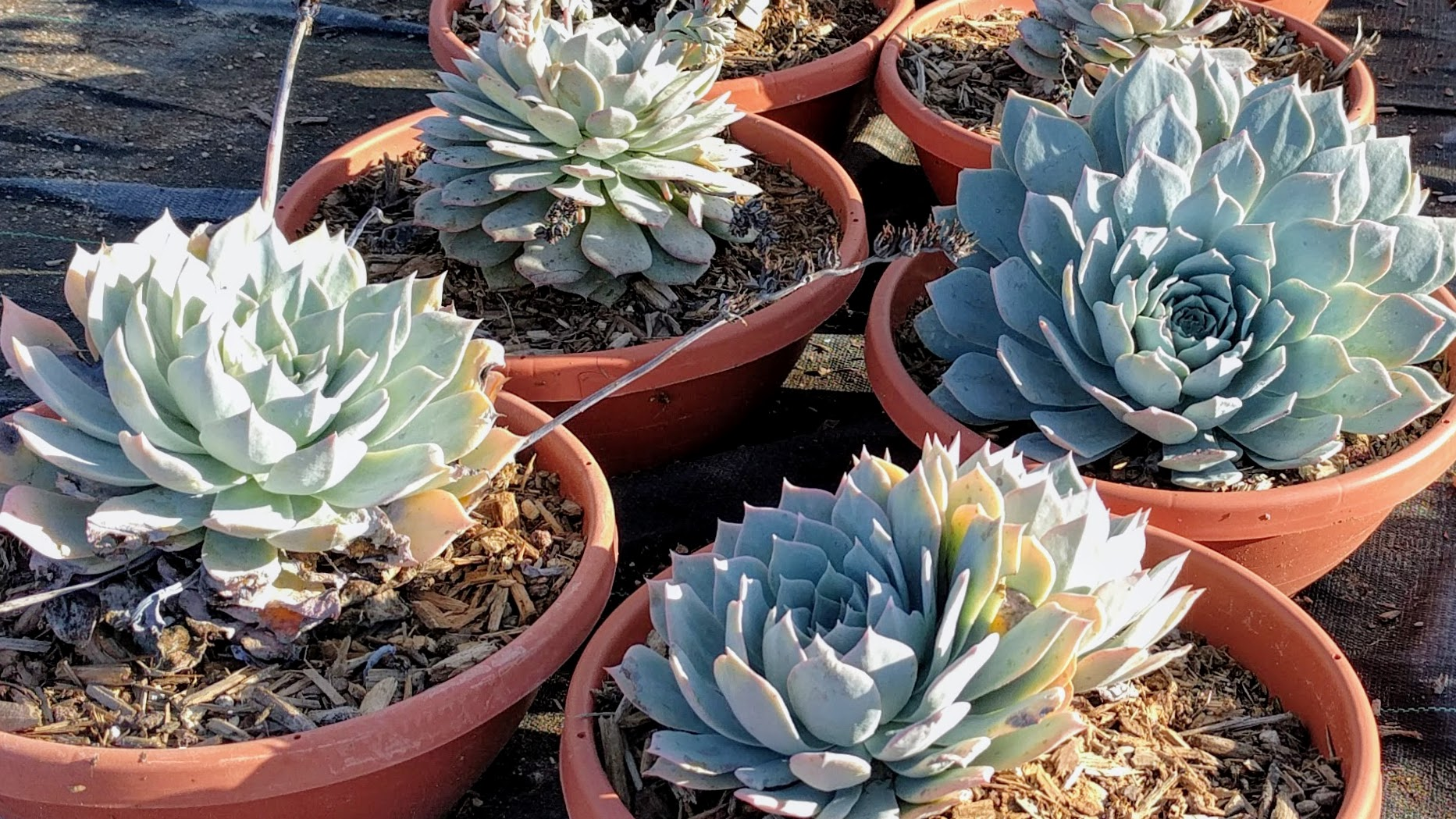

Scientific classification
- Kingdom: Plantae
- Clade: Tracheophytes
- Clade: Angiosperms
- Clade: Eudicots
- Order: Saxifragales
- Family: Crassulaceae
- Genus: Echeveria
- Species: E. desmetiana

Binomial name
- Echeveria desmetiana De Smet

Synonyms
- Cotyledon desmetiana (De Smet ex É.Morren) Hemsl.; Echeveria subsessilis Rose; Echeveria peacockii T.Moore, nom illeg., non Echeveria peacockii Croucher = Dudleya pulverulenta (Nutt.) Britton & Rose

= Echeveria desmetiana =

Species of succulent

Echeveria desmetiana, incorrectly known as Echeveria peacockii, is a succulent plant in the family Crassulaceae. L. de Smet was the first grower of this plant.

== Description ==
The leaves of Echeveria desmetiana are arranged in a rosette, either on a short stem or with no visible stem. The rosette may be about 11 cm in diameter. The leaves are widest at the base with a pointed end (mucronate), about 4–5 cm long, 2–3 cm wide and about 8 mm thick. The leaves are covered with a white to bluish bloom (pruinose), and have reddish margins. The flowering stem is reddish, and may be over 30 cm tall. The inflorescence is a cincinnus; one described specimen had 24 flowers. The individual flowers are about 11–13 mm long with petals that are red on the outside and yellow on the inside. The petals are pressed together, with only the tips curving outwards.

== Taxonomy ==
Echeveria desmetiana was first described by De Smet in 1879. The species had previously been described and illustrated as Echeveria peacockii by T. Moore in 1875, with reference to the name Echeveria peacockii that had been used by Croucher in 1874. However, Croucher's plant is now regarded as a different species, Dudleya pulverulenta, so Moore's name is illegitimate for the species he described, and the correct name is Echeveria desmetiana.

== Distribution ==
Echeveria desmetiana is native to central and southwest Mexico.

== Habitat and ecology ==
Echeveria desmetiana tends to grow on rocky outcroppings at higher altitudes. In this type of environment, water is drained quickly from the roots of the plant, never allowing the plant to be submerged in water. This plant is fast growing and requires a bright light to prevent stretching, which forms an unhealthy plant.

E. desmetiana grows in a warm, dry, sunny climate. They tend to grow in areas that are sometimes covered in shade (cannot tolerate too much sun). The optimal temperature for growth is 20-30°C.

== Cultivation ==
Echeveria desmetiana is cultivated as an ornamental plant, and often used as a drought-tolerant groundcover "carpet plant".
