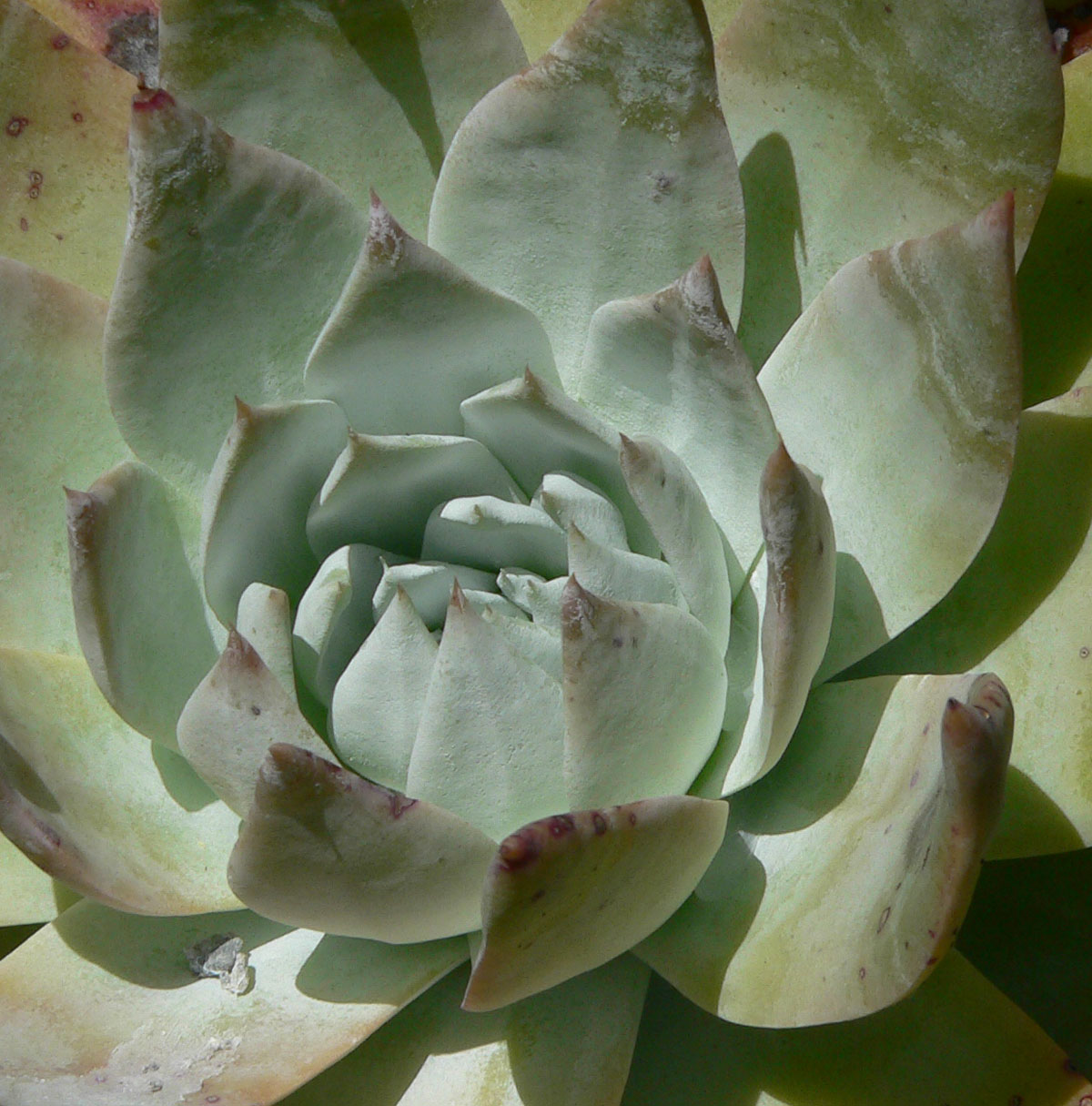

Scientific classification
- Kingdom: Plantae
- Clade: Tracheophytes
- Clade: Angiosperms
- Clade: Eudicots
- Order: Saxifragales
- Family: Crassulaceae
- Genus: Dudleya
- Species: D. anthonyi

Binomial name
- Dudleya anthonyi (Rose, 1903)
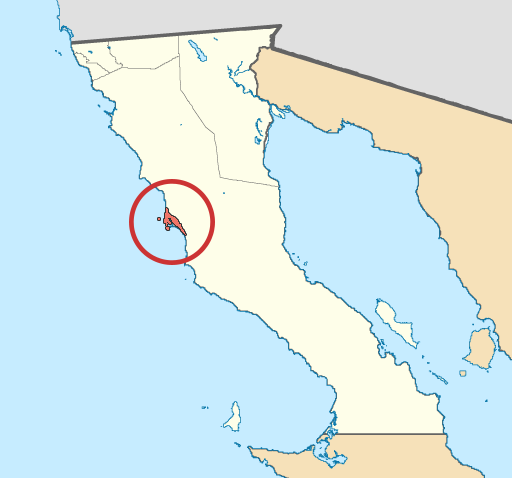
- Distribution of D. anthonyi

= Dudleya anthonyi =

Species of succulent

Dudleya anthonyi is a species of perennial succulent plant known commonly as the San Quintín liveforever. It is endemic to the San Quintín volcanic field, which encompasses the Bahia San Quintín and the adjacent Isla San Martín in Baja California. Dudleya anthonyi is a relatively large rosette-forming succulent and is characterized by its leaves and inflorescences that are coated in a white, chalky powder. It is quite similar to its close relative, the widespread Dudleya pulverulenta, but Dudleya anthonyi is distinguished by its narrower and acute basal leaves and bracts, along with narrower and pointed sepals and petals. Like its close relative, Dudleya anthonyi is one of the few members of the genus Dudleya that have a pollination syndrome almost exclusively favoring hummingbird pollinators, adaptations which are reflected by its long, red, and pendent flowers.

== Description ==
Dudleya anthonyi is very similar in appearance to Dudleya pulverulenta. Its stem leaves are narrower, its petals are narrower and united only below the middle, its sepals are narrow above but broadened at the base, and its petals are sharply acute. Dudleya anthonyi may usually be distinguished from D. puverulenta by its narrower and more rigid leaves, which taper from the base.

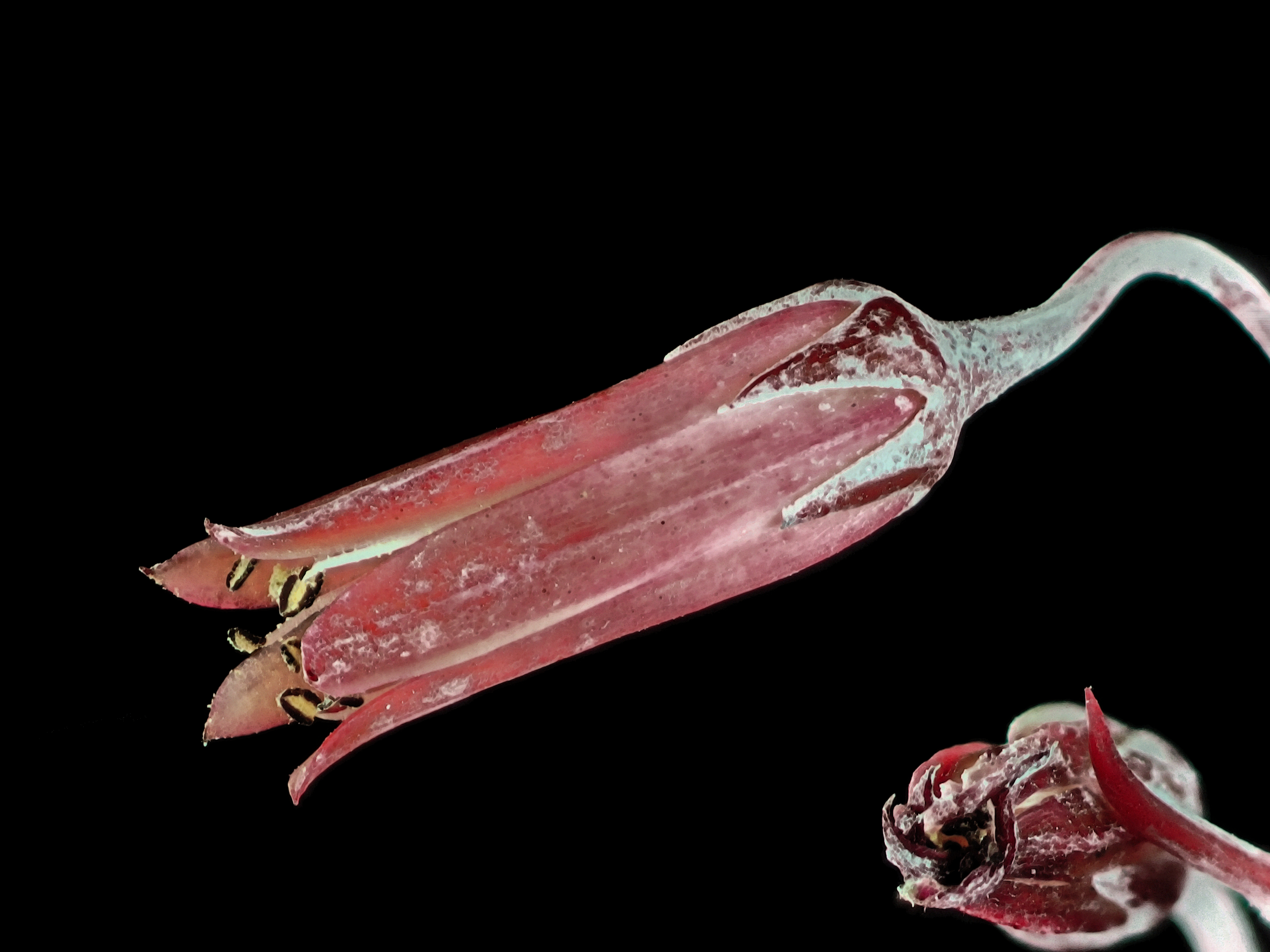
The flower of Dudleya anthonyi

The form of the plants varies persistent with location. Plants found on San Martin tend to be larger and with wider leaves than their counterparts on the coast of San Quintin Bay. Further south along the coast, another form exists in Socorro Canyon, with tall, erect stems, giving a resemblance of miniature trees.

The plant is unusual among Dudleya in that after seed is set, the flowers and their pedicels will become almost vertical.

Flowering is from early June to July.

== Taxonomy ==
The plant is named in honor of the ornithologist Alfred Anthony, who visited the area in 1897.

The species is known to hybridize with Dudleya cultrata on Isla San Martín. Their range overlaps on both the mainland and San Martín, but the hybrid is only obvious on the island.

The chromosome number is n = 17.

== Distribution and habitat ==
Dudleya anthonyi occurs is restricted to the San Quintín volcanic field, the scope of which includes the island of San Martin and the adjacent coast and peninsulas in the San Quintin Bay. The plant has a tendency to occur, like other Dudleya, on cliffs and canyons.
