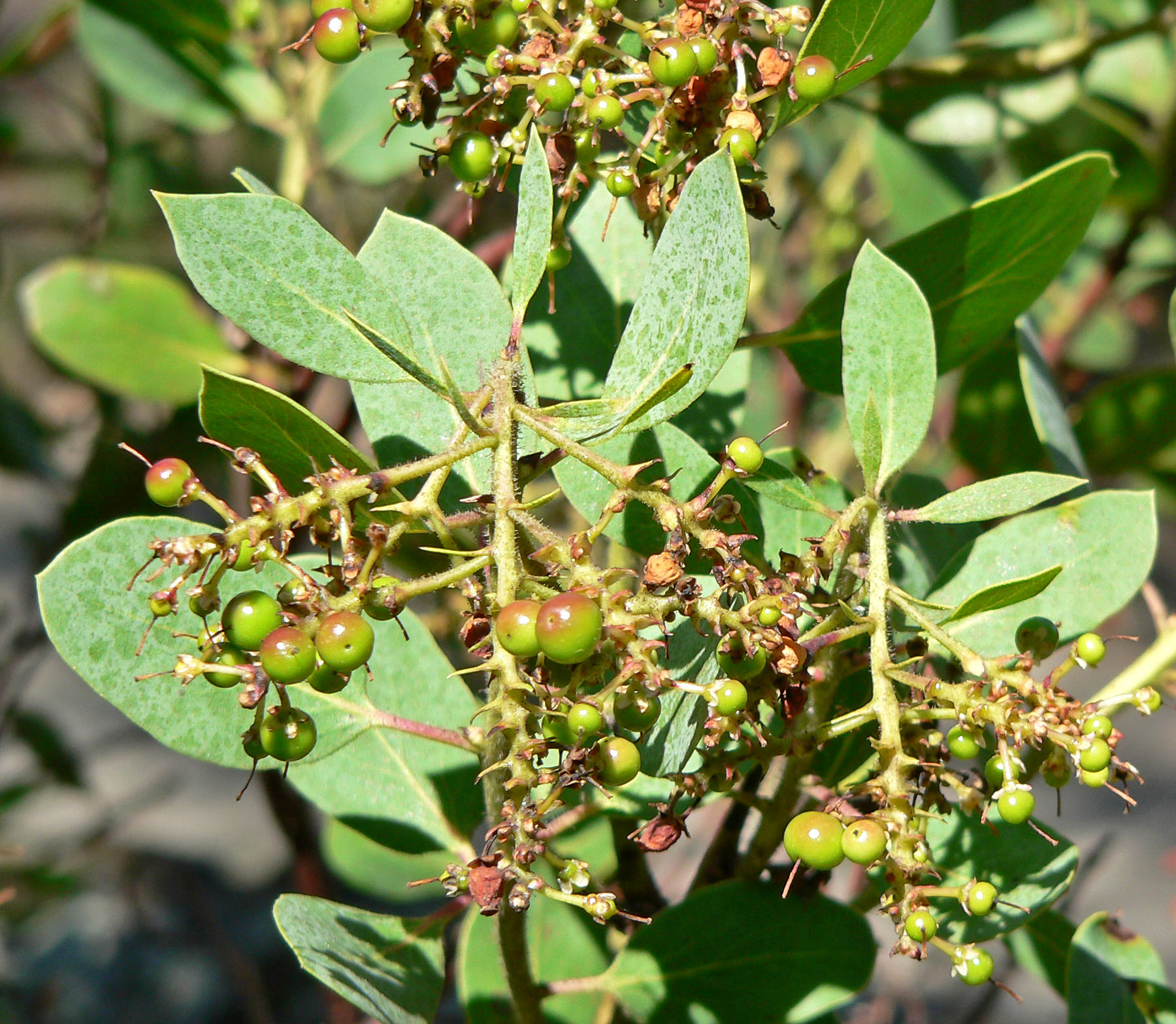

Scientific classification
- Kingdom: Plantae
- Clade: Tracheophytes
- Clade: Angiosperms
- Clade: Eudicots
- Clade: Asterids
- Order: Ericales
- Family: Ericaceae
- Genus: Arctostaphylos
- Species: A. peninsularis

Binomial name
- Arctostaphylos peninsularis P.V.Wells 1972

= Arctostaphylos peninsularis =

Species of flowering plant

Arctostaphylos peninsularis is a species of Arctostaphylos found in the Mexican state of Baja California.
