= San Quintín Volcanic Field =

Volcanic field in Baja California, Mexico

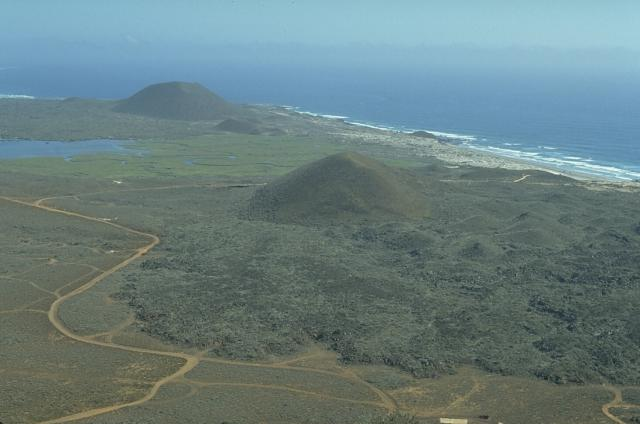
Aerial view of the San Quintín Volcanic Field

The San Quintín Volcanic Field is a collection of ten or eleven volcanic cinder cones situated along the Pacific coast of the Baja California peninsula in Mexico. The field formed by repeated eruptions beginning in the Pleistocene and ending about 3000 years ago. It is one of several known Quaternary period volcanic fields in Baja. The lava shields appear to have first grown as subaqueous volcanoes that emerged as islands.

Currently located in a shallow bay, the cones are found in two groups and two isolated islands. The Northern group is composed of two cones, formed 126,000–90,000 years ago; the Southern group is larger, with two cones in the lagoon itself, and formed over a much larger and undetermined span of time. Most volcanic complexes in the field have a well-preserved scoria cone and lava apron, dotted with eruptive vents and lava flows. 42 eruptive units can be seen on the ground today.

The San Quintín field is the only known location of intraplate-type mafic alkalic volcanism on the Baja California peninsula. The oldest cones mainly erupted primitive magmas with occasional small xenoliths. As the field evolved, differentiated magma became more common, although extremely pure primitive magmas – virtually devoid of xenoliths and unusually rich in olivine phenocrysts – still dominated at the young cones. These primitive magmas originated from progressive partial melting of spinel lherzolite at unusually shallow levels in the mantle. The ultramafic xenoliths found are mostly spinel lherzolite, with the final 20% harzburgites, dunites, and pyroxenites. The San Quintín field is also the only source of peridotitic and granulitic xenoliths on the peninsula. The largest and most abundant xenoliths are found in differentiated magmas.

== Description of the volcanic field ==
The San Quintín Volcanic Field is found about 260 km (160 mi) south of the U.S. border and 200 km (120 mi) south of Ensenada, Baja California, at a latitude of ~30.5°N. Today, the cones rest on over a kilometer of unconsolidated Plio-Quaternary sediment overlaid on the volcanic basement of the lower Cretaceous Alistos Formation.

The ten volcanic complexes recognized in the San Quintín field include Media Luna and Woodford in a northern group; a southern group consisting of Basu, Riveroll, Kenton, Picacho Vizcaino, Sudoeste, and Ceniza; and the isolated complexes Monte Mazo and Isla San Martín. A seacliff north of Basu exposes what may be an eleventh complex.

== Regional geologic setting ==
The Santillán and Barrera Line, an important tectonic boundary, is found about 16 km (9.9 mi) NE of the volcanic field. At the boundary is an emerged portion of the Continental Borderland, a section of marine deposition marking the west coast of the Baja Peninsula and the eastern border of the depositional trough. On the other side lies the Stable Peninsula Province, an area mostly devoid of faulting (as opposed to the Gulf of California escarpment) and covered in pre-batholithic and batholithic crystalline rocks. Another marine terrace escarpment is found 7 km (4.3 mi) to the east, rising 40–80 m (130–260 ft) above the coastal plain, with more late Cretaceous sediments overlain by early Tertiary conglomerates and Pliocene marine sediments.

== Evolution of areal faulting ==
From the Cretaceous period until about 29 million years ago (29 Ma), the oceanic Farallon Plate subducted eastward beneath the west coast of the North American Plate. The arrival of the Pacific-Farallon spreading center at the trench formed two triple junctions that migrated in opposite directions, northward and southward, along the coast. This stopped subduction and formed an interplate transform boundary. The southward-migrating triple junction passed San Quintín about 17 Ma and tip of Baja around 12 Ma, ending subduction in the Baja peninsula.

The cessation of subduction forced the Pacific and North American plates along the fault zones created alongside the San Benito and the Tosco-Abreojos faults, which run approximately parallel to the west coast of Baja. Over time, the direction of relative motion between these plates swung west, accommodated by extension in the protogulf of the Gulf of California. Simultaneously, normal faulting throughout the protogulf further weakened the areal lithosphere.

The northern protogulf was flooded as early as 13 Ma, and by 10 Ma, the region was experiencing eruptions of tholeiitic basalts. By 3.5 Ma, the gulf region was the center of most of the Pacific-North American plate motion, generating new seafloor from mid-ocean ridge basalts (MORB) at spreading centers following areal transform faults.

The fault planes of Baja, going NNW-SSE, now accommodate plate boundary displacement and are currently active. In 1975, a collection of seismic events occurred after a dearth of events for a third of a century about 35 km (22 mi) northwest of the field.

The ten volcanic complexes of San Quintín are all aligned N-S to NW-SE, parallel to an offshore fault, the Santillán and Barrera line, and the main escarpment of the Gulf of California. The cones are therefore related to faulting, but no direct evidence for extensional faulting has been found. Indirect evidence is found in the shared characteristics of the field with other Quaternary volcanic fields linked to extensional faulting found throughout the province. This includes intraplate geochemical signatures in the magmas, and the presence of mantle and crustal xenoliths.

== Volcanism ==
In Baja California, high-volume volcanism ended around 15 Ma, shortly after the end of subduction. The third oldest volcano has reliably (using 40Ar/39Ar step-heating) been dated to 126,000 years ago. Following eruptions in the northern gulf area covered the San Quintin Volcanic Field in alkalic, diopside-rich basalts. General characteristics of these basalts, known as bajaites, are also similar to the alkali basalts found in Baja California Sur, as well as high-magnesium andesites of the Aleutians.

These bajaites, mostly found a bit south of the San Quintín volcanic field, have high Mg, Ni, Cr, and Sr, low Rb, and high K/Rb and La/Yb ratios. The characteristics may suggest that one source is slab-derived melts, i.e. a subducting plate adds volatiles to the ultramafic rock of the upper mantle such that it melts. It has been proposed that the slab fully subducted in the relevant latitudes of the San Quintín field, so that a "no-slab window" allowed the plate to directly access asthenospheric mantle. This is the most obvious explanation of the observered intraplate characteristics of the alkali basalts, with lherzolite. Alternatively, the bajaites could be formed from partial melting in the mantle of metasomatized mantle apatite and amphibole, followed by postsubduction rifting. This explanation leaves the field untouched by a second subduction episode and leads more naturally to the ocean island basalts that are also present.

== Geochemistry ==
The basalt lavas of the San Quintín field have the same composition as ocean island basalts found in Hawaii and the Azores, where they are associated with mantle plumes. Isotopic composition ranges overlap for primitive and differentiated rocks, indicating that the latter was derived from fractional crystallization of the primitive magmas. Xenolith abundance in the differentiated magma hint that fractional crystallization occurred within the mantle, below entrained peridotite. Due to this depth and the estimated speed of ascent, fractionation-elevated volatiles may have been important in driving the differentiated magmas to the surface. Partial melting in the mantle, or the progressive exhaustion of incompatible elements in the source, led to a decrease in abundances of these volatiles as the field evolved.

Crustal contamination can be inferred from samples taken from two cones, and small isotopic variations for the other cones indicate at least three mantle components.

The primitive magmas differ from other reported intraplate-type mafic alkalic suites by having relatively high Al_{2}O_{3} and Yb, as well as low ratios of La/Yb and CaO/Al_{2}O_{3}. Rising Al_{2}O_{3} and falling CaO, along with decreasing incompatible element abundances, are consistent with progressive partial melting.

== Xenoliths ==
The ultramafic xenoliths of the field are composed roughly of 80% spinel lherzolites, with lesser harzburgites, dunites, and pyroxenites. There is a high abundance of clinopyroxenes, about 35% by volume. Granulite xenoliths, interpreted as being derived from the lower crust, and peridotite xenoliths, interpreted as derived from the upper mantle, are particularly abundant in the Woodford, Media Luna, and Basu cones.

The site exhibits strong deformation textures, which may have recorded plastic deformation that occurred with the diapiric rise of mantle through the low-velocity zone. Alternatively, more complicated models suggest that a shallow, active shear zone deformed the xenoliths and it was only later that the deeper, source magmas modified the chemical composition of the field.

== See also ==
- List of volcanic fields
