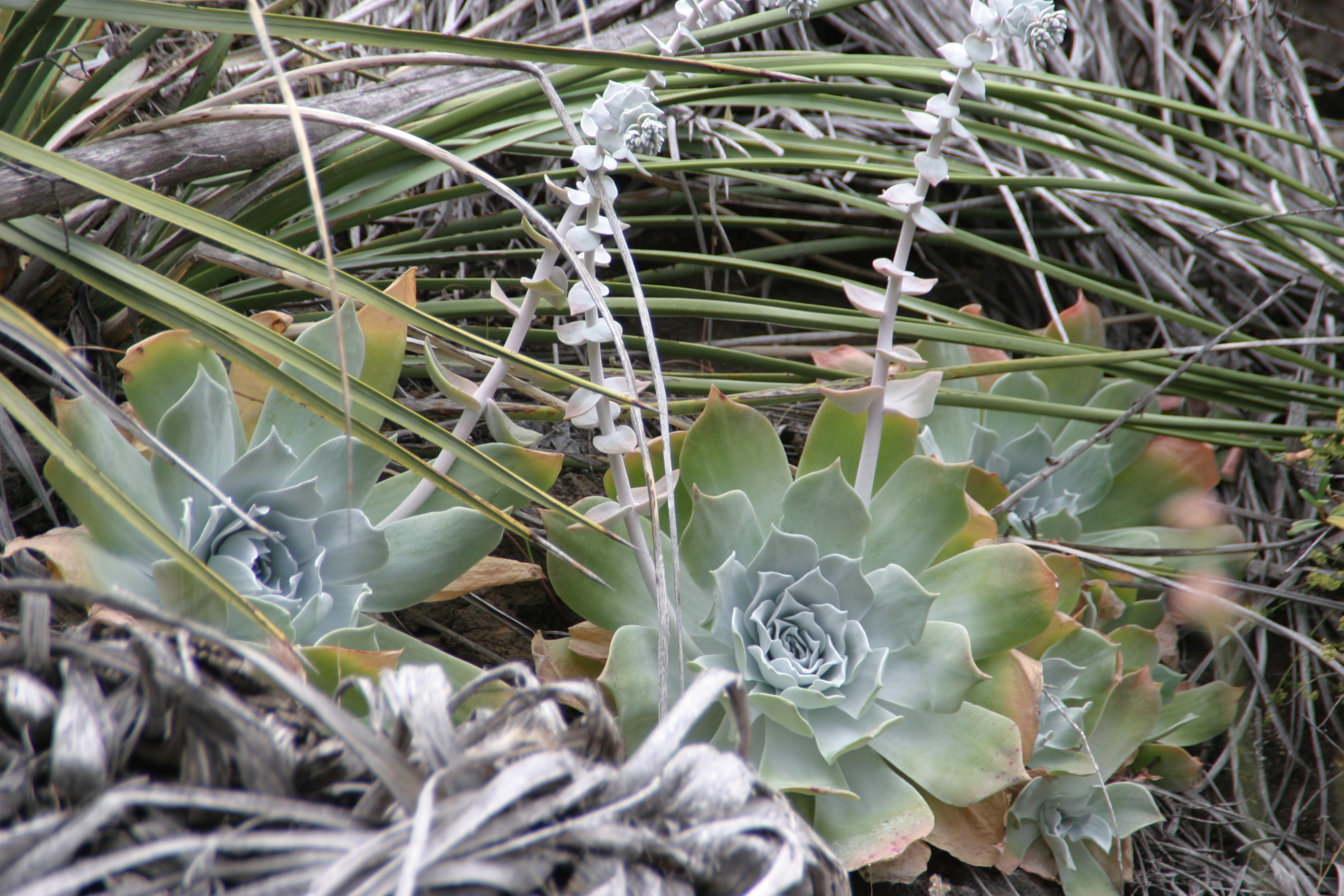

Conservation status
- Apparently Secure (NatureServe)

Scientific classification
- Kingdom: Plantae
- Clade: Embryophytes
- Clade: Tracheophytes
- Clade: Angiosperms
- Clade: Eudicots
- Order: Saxifragales
- Family: Crassulaceae
- Genus: Dudleya
- Species: D. pulverulenta

Binomial name
- Dudleya pulverulenta (Nutt.) Britt. & Rose

Synonyms
- Cotyledon peacockii Baker; Cotyledon pulverulenta (Nutt.) Baker; Echeveria argentea Lem.; Echeveria peacockii Croucher ex T.Moore & Mast.; Echeveria pulverulenta Nutt.

= Dudleya pulverulenta =

Chalk dudleya

Species of succulent plant found in the U.S. and Mexico

Dudleya pulverulenta is a species of perennial succulent plant known by the common names chalk lettuce, chalk dudleya, and chalk liveforever. It is one of the largest Dudleya, with a silvery, waxy rosette that may greatly contrast with its habitat. It is also regarded as one of the most distinctive members of the Dudleya, with one of the most specialized inflorescences in the genus, adapted to hummingbird pollination through its red pendent flowers, the longest corolla, and the highest nectar output. Dudleya pulverulenta has the largest range of all Dudleya, over 1,000 kilometres (620 mi), being found from southern Monterey County in California to the Sierra de San Borja in southern Baja California. It is closely related to Dudleya arizonica, a smaller desert species that tends to lack the specialized floral traits, and Dudleya anthonyi, which differs in a few morphological traits and is restricted to the San Quintín Volcanic Field.

== Description ==
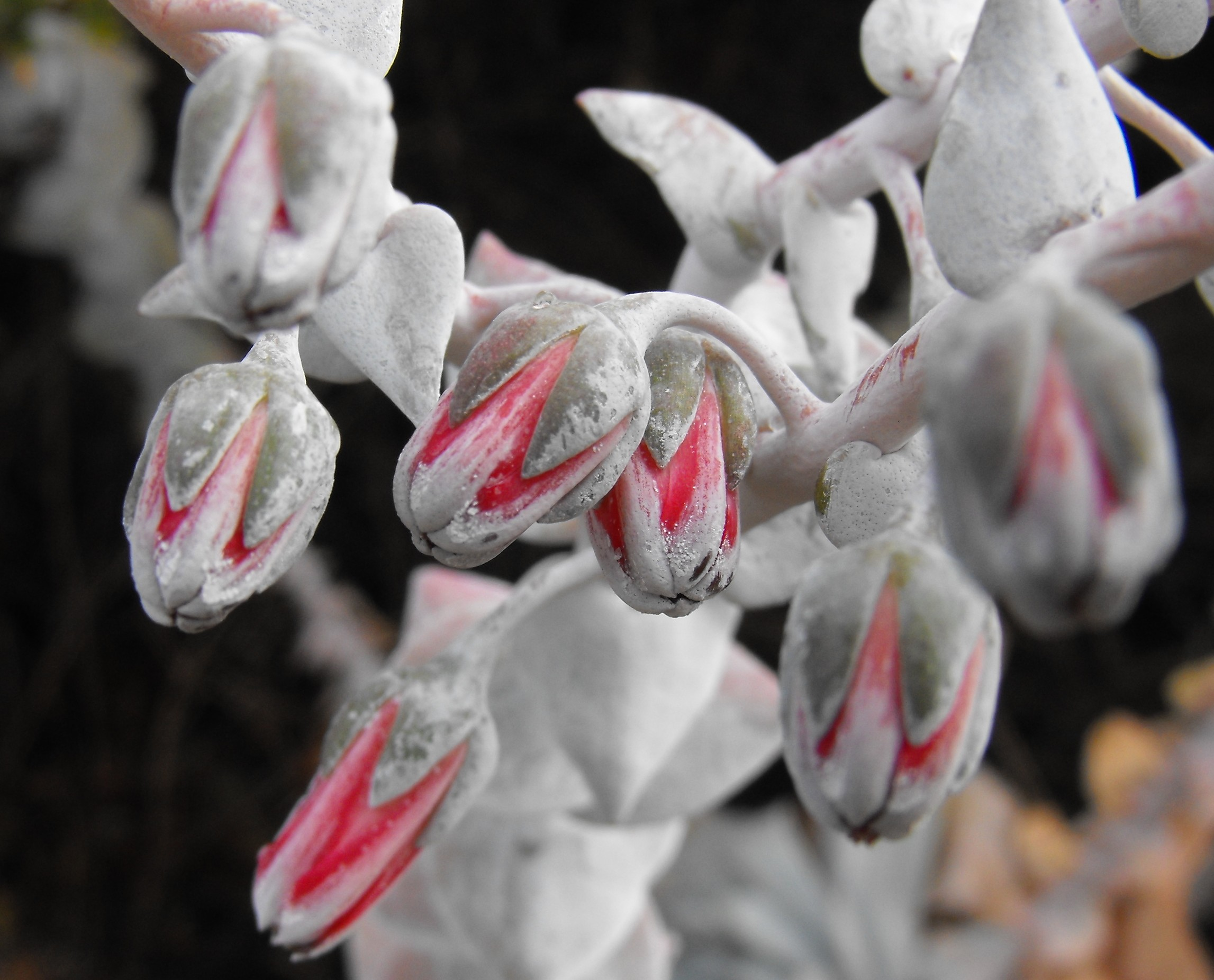
Detail of the flowers.

Dudleya pulverulenta is a rosette-forming, succulent species of plant, covered in a distinctive chalky and mealy wax, known as a farina, or more technically, epicuticular wax. It is one of the largest species of Dudleya. All parts of the inflorescence are covered in a chalky wax, and the flowering stems may reach up to 150 cm (59 in) long.

=== Pollination syndrome ===
Dudleya pulverulenta exhibits a pollination syndrome uniquely adapted to hummingbirds. The flowers have long red petal tubes (corollas) and are unscented. The flowers hang downward (pendent), achieved by a twist at the base of the terminal inflorescence branches, known as the cincinni, which inverts the flowers from the typically erect or ascending position seen in other Dudleya. Like other hummingbird-adapted plants, the pendent flowers allow hummingbirds to readily reach the flowers from below, discouraging bees and other insect pollinators from easily landing. After flowering, the fruits are turned erect by a sharp turn of the branchlet connecting the flower to the inflorescence (the pedicel).

This syndrome is only shared by the other two species in the genus, both close relatives of Dudleya pulverulenta: Dudleya anthonyi and Dudleya arizonica. D. arizonica is similar in appearance, and approaches D. pulverulenta in many aspects, but most populations lack the downward-pointing flowers and unique fruiting behavior, instead having erect flowers and a more reduced size. One of the only other hummingbird-specialized species in the genus, Dudleya rigida, found in far southern Baja California Sur, also has long, red, unscented pendent flowers, but the pendent flowers result from different orientations of the inflorescence structures compared to D. pulverulenta and its relatives. Other Dudleya, like Dudleya cymosa subsp. pumila and Dudleya lanceolata, have some adaptations to hummingbirds, but do not fully attain the traits of typical hummingbird flowers.

=== Morphology ===
Dudleya pulverulenta grows a thick caudex, 4–10 cm (1.6–3.9 in) wide. As the plant grows older, the stem gradually becomes decumbent. The stem is densely clothed with old, dried leaves. Atop this stem is a solitary rosette, as the stems do not form axillary branches. The rosette reaches a width of 7–60 cm (2.8–23.6 in), and is composed of 40 to 60 wide, flat, fleshy, chalky white leaves which age to a pinkish papery texture. The leaves are shaped oblong, broadest at the base or upper third, with the tip acuminate to mucronate, or acute. The leaves are 8–25 cm (3.1–9.8 in) long by 3–10 cm (1.2–3.9 in) wide, and are 3–10 mm (0.12–0.39 in) thick. The epidermis of the plant is covered with a dense coating of chalky, powdery epicuticular wax.

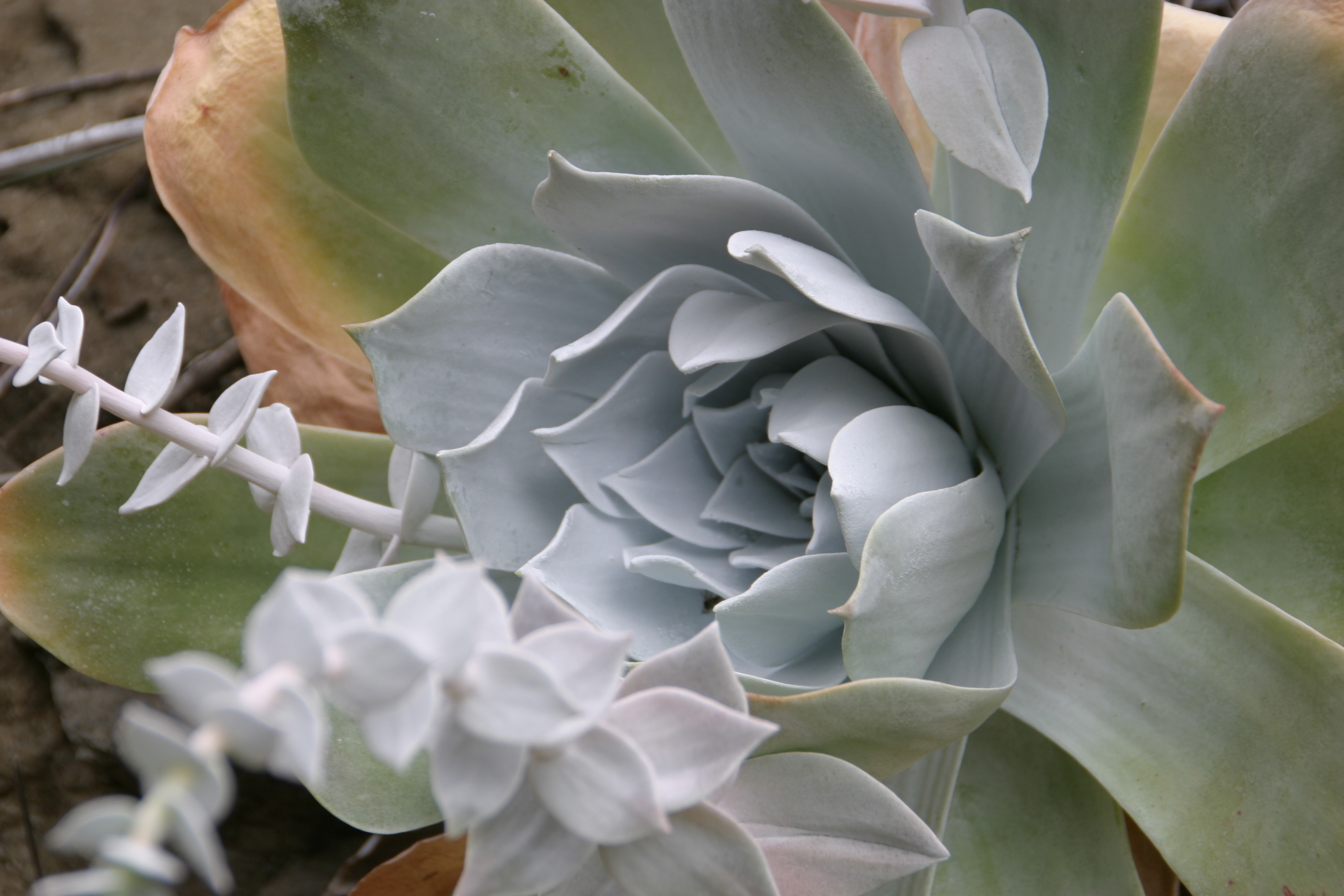
The basal rosette.

The peduncle is 30–100 cm (12–39 in) tall by 5–20 mm (0.20–0.79 in) wide, and is covered in 20 to 70 bracts. The bracts are spreading to deflexed, and are shaped cordate-ovate to suborbiculate, with an acuminate tip. The bracts measure 20–50 mm (0.79–1.97 in) long by 15–30 mm (0.59–1.18 in) wide, and may be a reddish color. The peduncle branches into 2 to 6 branches, which may or may not rebranch. There are 2 to 5 terminal branches, known as cincinni, that are nodding in youth but become spreading in age, and measure 10–50 cm (3.9–19.7 in) long. The cincinni are circinate, unfurling like the frond of a fern. The cincinni hold 10 to 30 flowers, and are twisted at the base, so that the flowers are on the underside.

Suspending the flowers pendent are the pedicels, which measure 10–35 mm (0.39–1.38 in) long. In age, the pedicels sharply bend in the near middle to bring the fruits to a more or less erect position. The calyx measures 5–9 mm (0.20–0.35 in) long by 5–8 mm (0.20–0.31 in) wide, with mostly acute sepals. The petals are 11–19 mm (0.43–0.75 in) long, and united for 6–10 mm (0.24–0.39 in) along their length. The apex of the petals is shaped acute to obtuse, with the tips erect. The sepals are waxy, while the petals are red, with some wax.

Dudleya pulverulenta flowers in early summer, usually from May to July. Plants subject to full sun close their rosettes during the summer, and in July to August the leaves will begin to fold upward and inward, "shrinking" in the heightened temperatures. Plants on north-facing or shaded slopes are less likely to close their rosettes.

=== Phytochemistry ===
Higher temperatures are tolerated well by Dudleya because of their epicuticular wax, which reflects light and prevents evaporation of water droplets.

== Taxonomy ==
The type specimen was collected by Thomas Nutall in San Diego, in May 1835. Dudleya puvlerulenta hybridizes with Dudleya lanceolata where they overlap in their ranges.

=== Characteristics ===
Dudleya pulverulenta intergrades with both Dudleya anthonyi and Dudleya arizonica, and the boundaries between these three entities are not always clearly defined. Dudleya brittonii bears a superficial resemblance to this species, but differs significantly in its smaller yellowish-white flowers and dense inflorescence. Two charts (below) compares the characteristics of these four species.

Comparison of vegetative features of Dudleya pulverulenta with similar species
Species	Dudleya pulverulenta	Dudleya anthonyi	Dudleya arizonica	Dudleya brittonii
Image				
Rosette width	7–60 cm (2.8–23.6 in)	15–50 cm (5.9–19.7 in)	10–25 cm (3.9–9.8 in)	10–50 cm (3.9–19.7 in)
# of leaves	40–60	35–90, 40–60	15–25	40–120
Leaf shape	Oblong, usually widest in distal 1/3	Oblong, widest at base	Oblong-oblanceolate to oblong-ovate	Linear to oblong-lanceolate
Leaf tip	Acuminate, mucronate, to acute	Acuminate or sharply acute	Long-acuminate	Long-acuminate

Comparison of reproductive features of Dudleya pulverulenta with similar species
Species	Dudleya pulverulenta	Dudleya anthonyi	Dudleya arizonica	Dudleya brittonii
Image				
Peduncle length	30–100 cm (12–39 in), 30–80 cm (12–31 in)	40–70 cm (16–28 in), 30–70 cm (12–28 in)	15–60 cm (5.9–23.6 in)	30–100 cm (12–39 in)
# of fls. per cincinni	10–30	12–25	3–6, 4–20	5–20
Pedicel length	5–30 mm (0.20–1.18 in), 10–35 mm (0.39–1.38 in)	12–15 mm (0.47–0.59 in)	5–15 mm (0.20–0.59 in), 5–20 mm (0.20–0.79 in)	6–15 mm (0.24–0.59 in)
Pedicels at anthesis	Pendent	Pendent	Erect, ascending, rarely spreading to pendent	Erect
Petal color	Red, with some wax	Deep red	Red to apricot yellow	Yellowish-white
Sepal shape	Triangular to triangular-ovate, acute	Triangular-lanceolate to linear, pointed	Acute	Long-lanceolate, acute

== Distribution and habitat ==
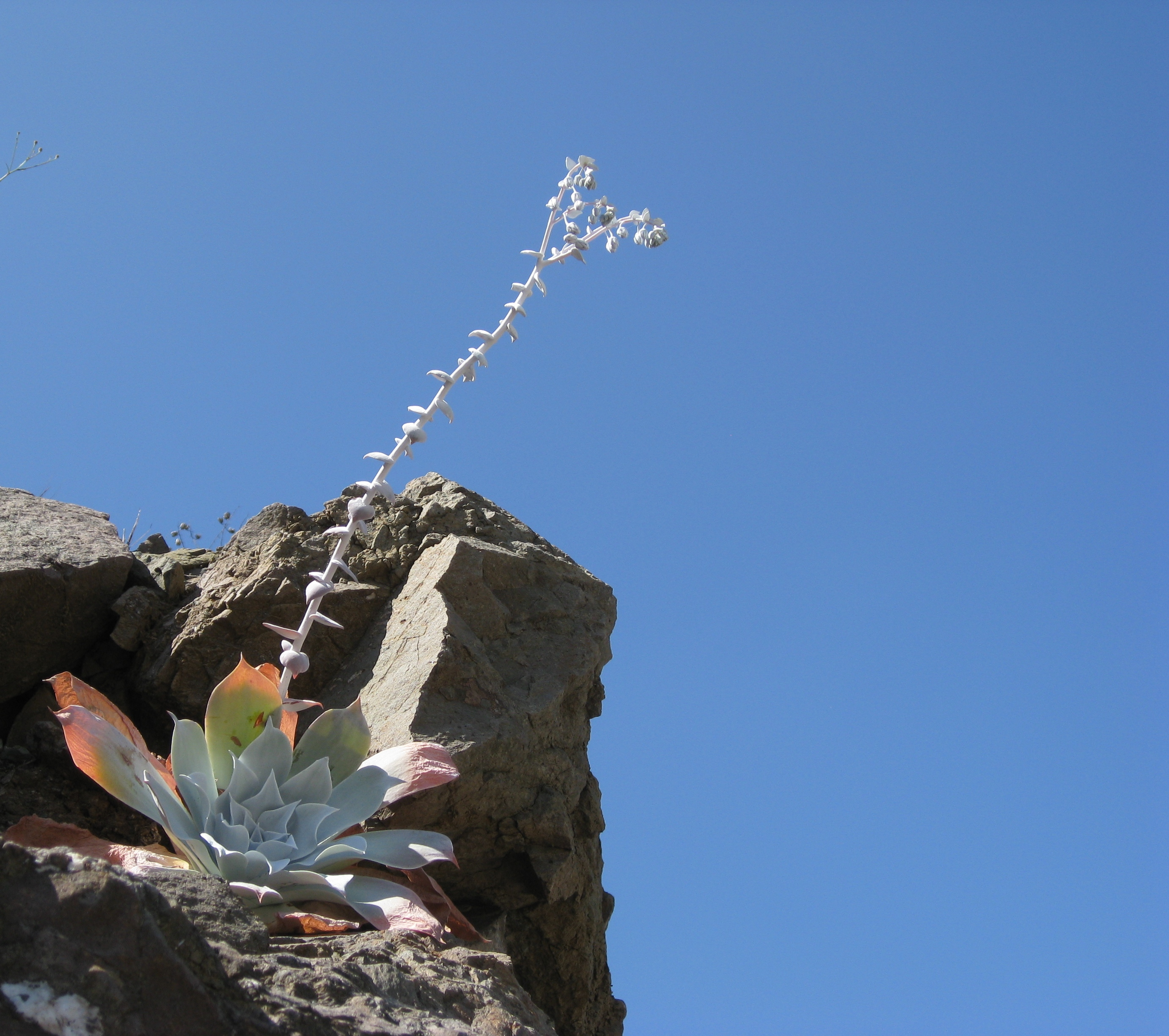
Growing in habitat

Dudleya pulverulenta is native to California and Baja California. Its range extends from extreme southern Monterey County southward to Punta Prieta in the central desert of Baja California. It is typically found in rocky cliffs, and canyons, generally under 1000 meters in elevation. It is primarily a plant of coastal distribution and can often be found within 12 miles of the coast, and more inland occurrences are typically in valleys where the heat is moderated by elevation or coastal influence.

Plants are very rapid recolonizers as evidenced by proliferation on roadcuts or disturbed soil shortly after development. Their habitat preference for rocky, shallow soils and open habitats mean that fuel is limited in proximity to the plants, enabling them to survive wildfire. The plant will resprout after fire.

== Cultivation ==
The plant tolerates full sun exposure or part shade. It is susceptible to aphid infestations which result in flower and rosette deformities. It is a much hardier plant for the garden environment than the more commonly available Dudleya brittonii.

Dudleya pulverulenta is not noted for its longevity and may only live up to 2 or 3 years in cultivation, but some specimens in the wild may be over 40 years old in a most optimal location. When the plant dies, the rosette takes on a withered, ashy gray appearance, resembling a bird's nest. A dormant plant will often surround a few live leaves with a ring of withered leaves until the next growing season pushes them down.

== See also ==
- Dudleya anthonyi
- Dudleya arizonica
- Dudleya brittonii
