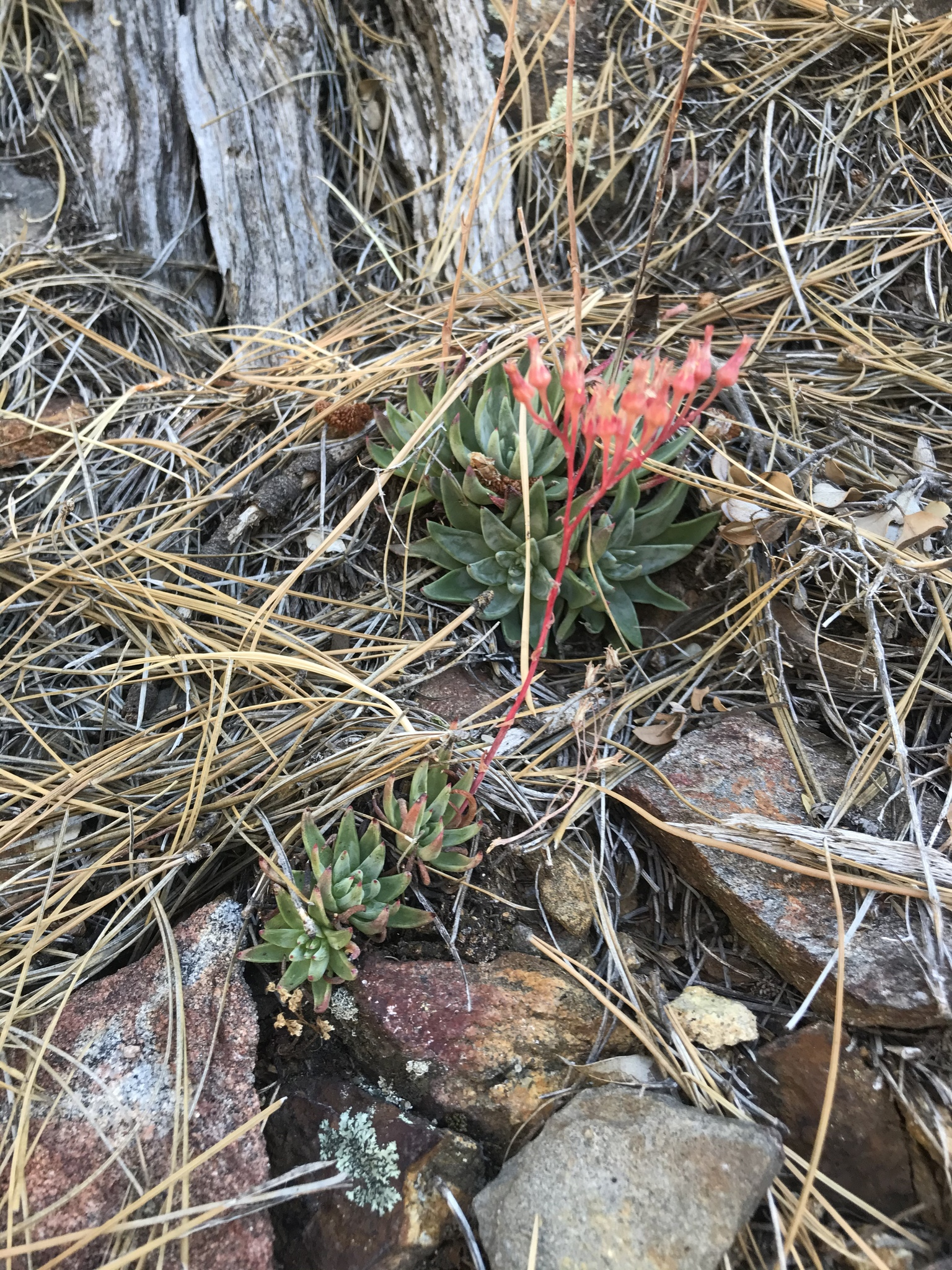

Scientific classification
- Kingdom: Plantae
- Clade: Tracheophytes
- Clade: Angiosperms
- Clade: Eudicots
- Order: Saxifragales
- Family: Crassulaceae
- Genus: Dudleya
- Species: D. pauciflora

Binomial name
- Dudleya pauciflora Rose

Synonyms
- Echeveria pauciflora (Rose) A.Berger; Cotyledon pauciflora (Rose) Fedde

= Dudleya pauciflora =

Species of succulent plant from Mexico

Dudleya pauciflora is a species of succulent plant in the stonecrop family known by the common name few-flower liveforever. It is characterized by its small crowded rosettes of narrow leaves and its colorful inflorescence with red-yellow flowers. Found growing on rocky outcrops and cliffs in the high elevation mountains of the Sierra de San Pedro Martir and the Sierra de San Borja, it is endemic to the state of Baja California, Mexico.

== Description ==
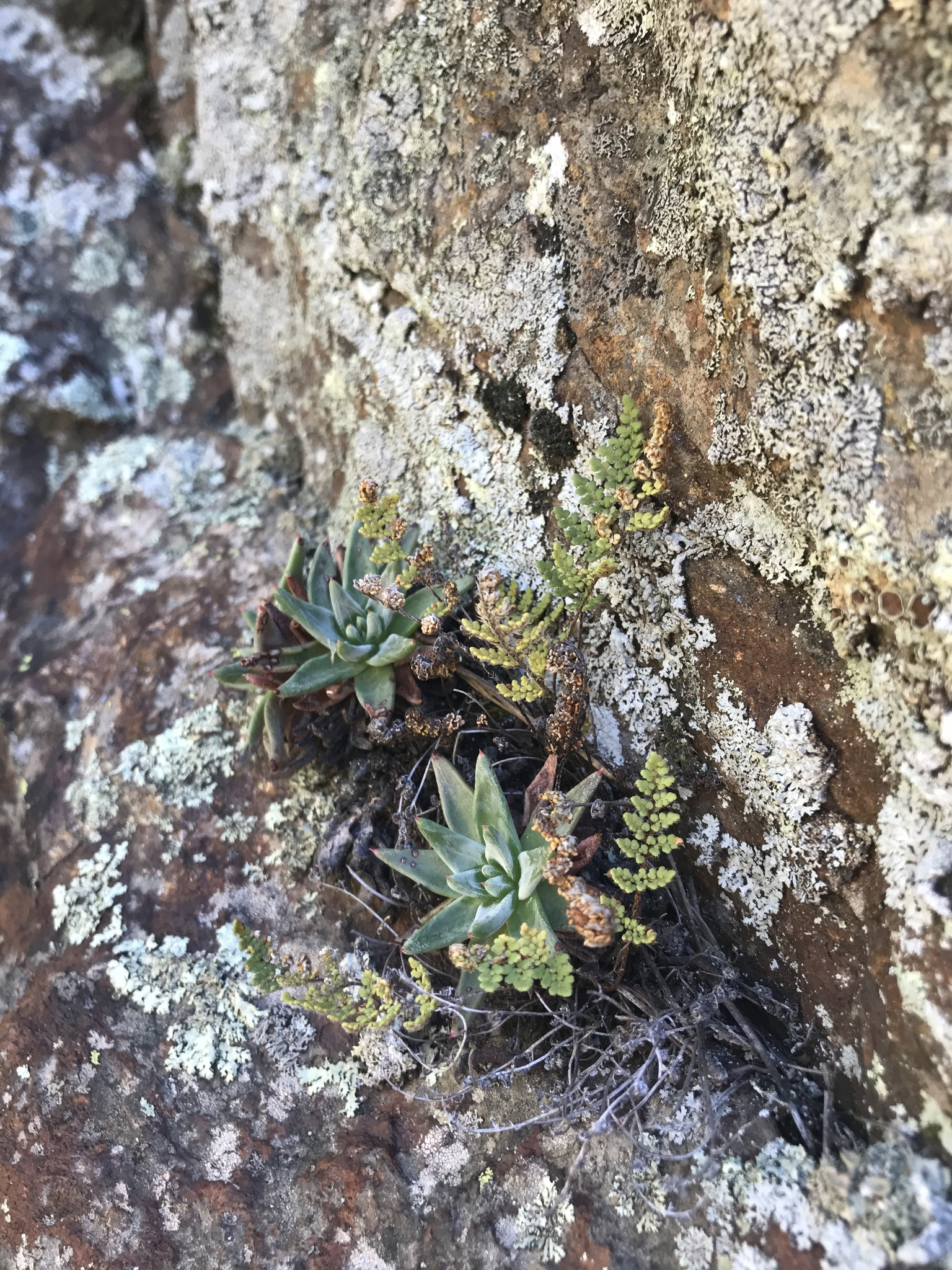
Dudleya pauciflora growing from a crevice

Dudleya pauciflora is a rosette-forming succulent plant that forms clumps by branching dichotomously. It is characterized by small, crowded rosettes, a colorful inflorescence with long pedicels, and small, red-marked yellow flowers. When compared to other congeners, the clustered rosettes resemble those of Dudleya abramsii, while the reddish flowers and inflorescence resemble that of Dudleya nubigena. Both Reid Moran and Joseph Nelson Rose suggested the possibility of a relationship between D. pauciflora and D. nubigena.

=== Morphology ===
The caudex is short, measuring 0.7–2.5 cm (0.28–0.98 in) thick, and densely clothed with persistent dried leaves. The caudex branches caespitosely, forming clumps of rosettes up to 3 dm (12 in) wide and containing up to 100 individual rosettes. When plants have densely crowded rosettes, the leaves are erect to ascending; when plants have few rosettes, the leaves are more spreading. The leaves may be green to farinose, shaped triangular-lanceolate, with a narrowly acute, apiculate tip. The leaves are 2–5 cm (0.79–1.97 in) long and 2–5 mm (0.079–0.197 in) thick.

The floral stems emerge in summer, the peduncle 2–5 mm (0.079–0.197 in) thick, red, and glaucous. The stems are bare of leaves in their lower portions, but have 8 to 30 bracts above. The bracts are ascending, shaped triangular-lanceolate, the lowermost 1–3 cm (0.39–1.18 in) long. The cyme is composed of 2 to 3 bifurcate or simple branches. The terminal branches are circinate, unfurling like the frond of a fern, and in age become nearly erect. The terminal branches have 2 to 16 flowers, which open at intervals of 2 to 5 days. The pedicels are red and mostly erect, although at first ascending, or rarely pendent, the first one usually 7–20 mm (0.28–0.79 in) long.

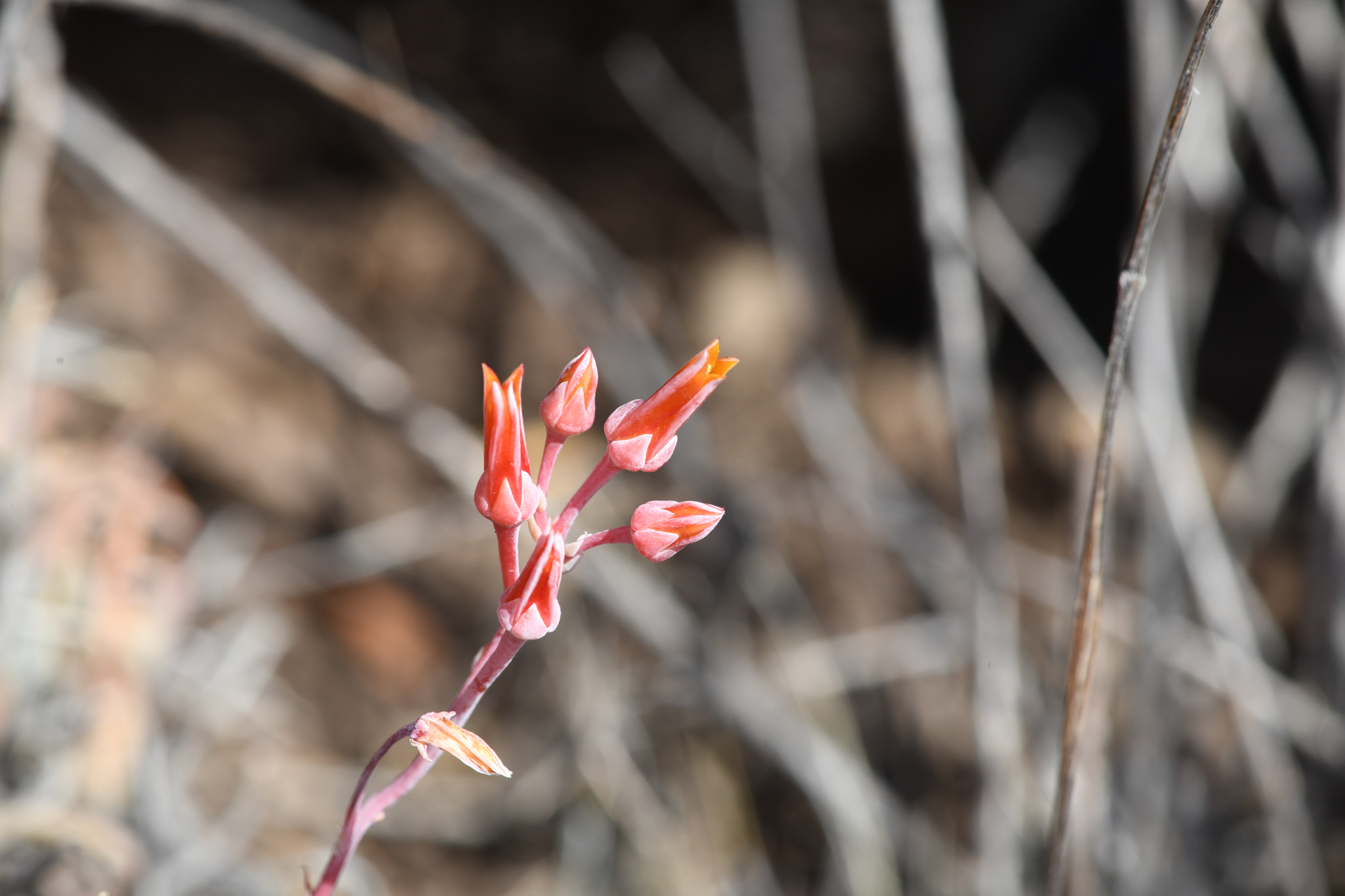
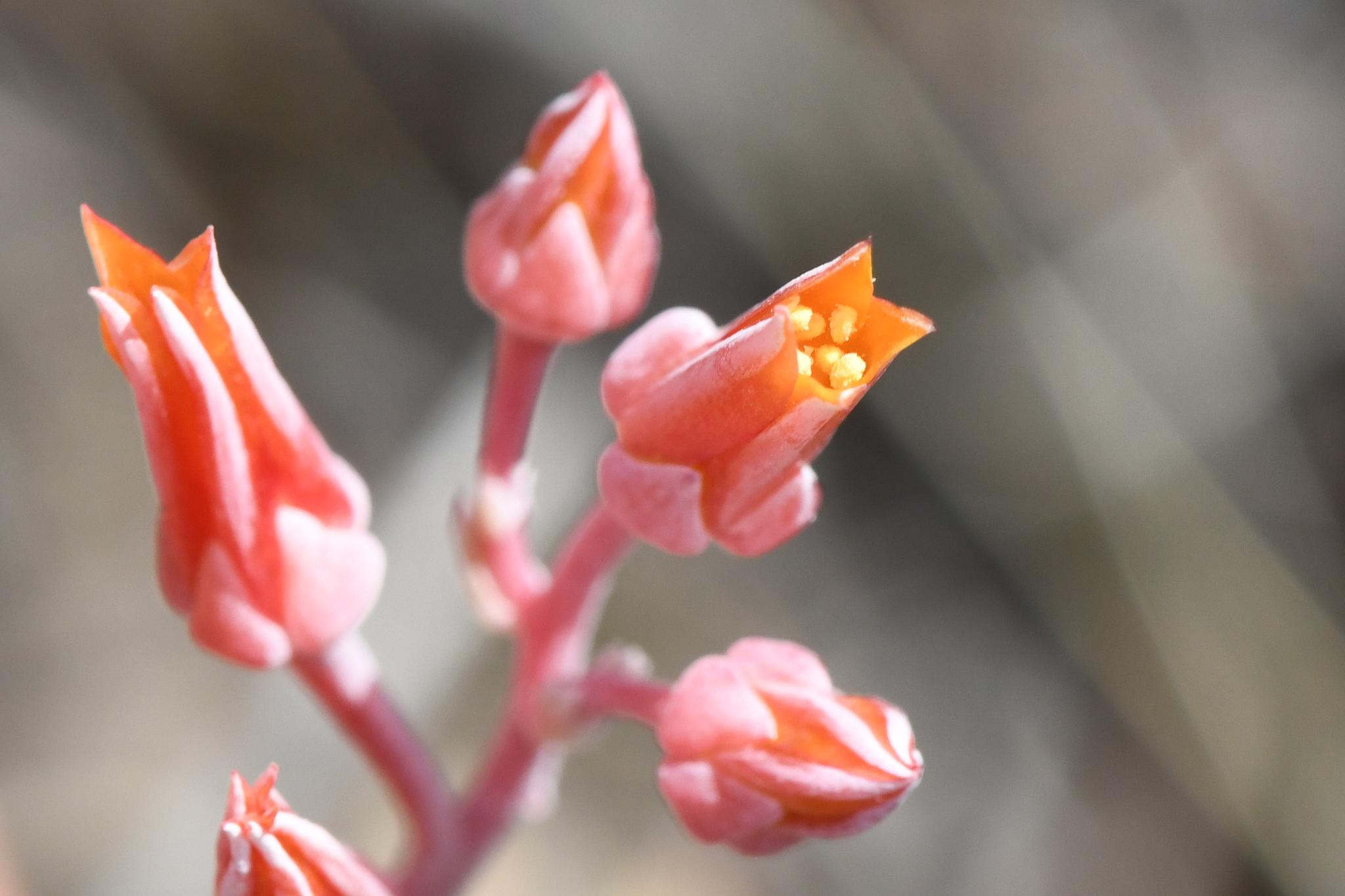
The flowers of Dudleya pauciflora in the Sierra de San Borja

The flowers mostly open from July to September. Flower parts usually number in 5. The calyx is red, 3–5 mm (0.12–0.20 in) long, with deltoid segments. The corolla is pentagonal, 6–10 mm (0.24–0.39 in) long. The petals are yellow within, while the keels are flushed with red, giving an orange or reddish appearance to the corolla. The petals are shaped oblong, with acute tips, 1.5–3 mm (0.059–0.118 in) wide.

== Taxonomy ==
=== Taxonomic history ===
Townshend Stith Brandegee, a noted botanist and explorer of the Baja California Peninsula, collected this plant in May 1893, at a locality some 200 km south of the United States-Mexico border in the Sierra de San Pedro Martir. Brandegee was one of the first botanists to explore this range, which is the highest on the peninsula. As his specimen was collected in May, he was too early to witness the flowers, since this species blooms from July to September. His specimen only contained dry floral stems from the previous season.

Dr. Joseph Nelson Rose, in his revision of the North American Crassulaceae with Nathaniel Lord Britton, named this plant from Brandegee's specimen. Working with only the dried floral stems, the name pauciflora, meaning "few-flowered," was applied. Reid Moran noted that the species does not, in fact, have notably few flowers, but that the epithet was a result of the poor type specimen Rose was working off of.

Two homotypic synonyms exist for Dudleya pauciflora. In 1904, German botanist Friedrich Karl Georg Fedde, in the botanical yearbook Just's Botanischer Jahresbericht, recombined all Dudleya back into Cotyledon, but retained the new species created by Britton and Rose, thus creating Cotyledon pauciflora. In 1930, German botanist Alwin Berger, who worked within the Engler system of plant taxonomy, recombined a number of the new species created by Britton and Rose into Echeveria, creating Echeveria pauciflora.

== Distribution and habitat ==
Dudleya pauciflora occurs at high elevations in the Sierra San Pedro Mártir and the Sierra de San Borja, in Baja California. Occurrences of D. pauciflora can be found from 1,250 m (4,100 ft) to the peak of the San Pedro Mártir, the Picacho del Diablo, at up to 3,025 m (9,925 ft). 240 km (150 mi) to the south-southeast, in the Sierra de San Borja, this species is found on the highest peak in the range, the Cerro la Sandia.

== See also ==
Montane species of Dudleya on the Baja California Peninsula:

- Dudleya abramsii
- Dudleya rigida
- Dudleya nubigena
