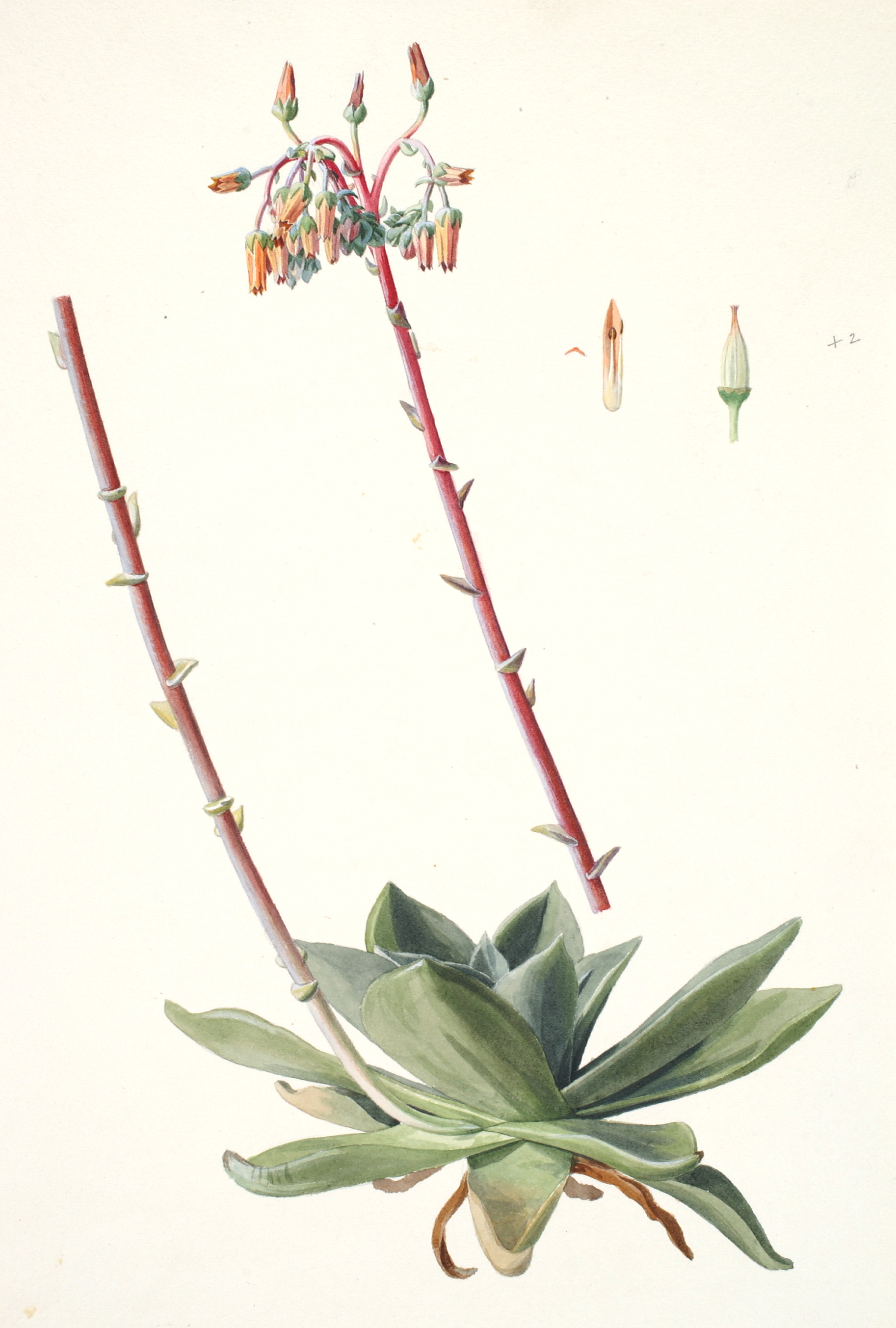
- The watercolor illustration by Frederick Andrews Walpole

Scientific classification
- Kingdom: Plantae
- Clade: Embryophytes
- Clade: Tracheophytes
- Clade: Angiosperms
- Clade: Eudicots
- Order: Saxifragales
- Family: Crassulaceae
- Genus: Dudleya
- Species: D. rigida

Binomial name
- Dudleya rigida Britton & Rose
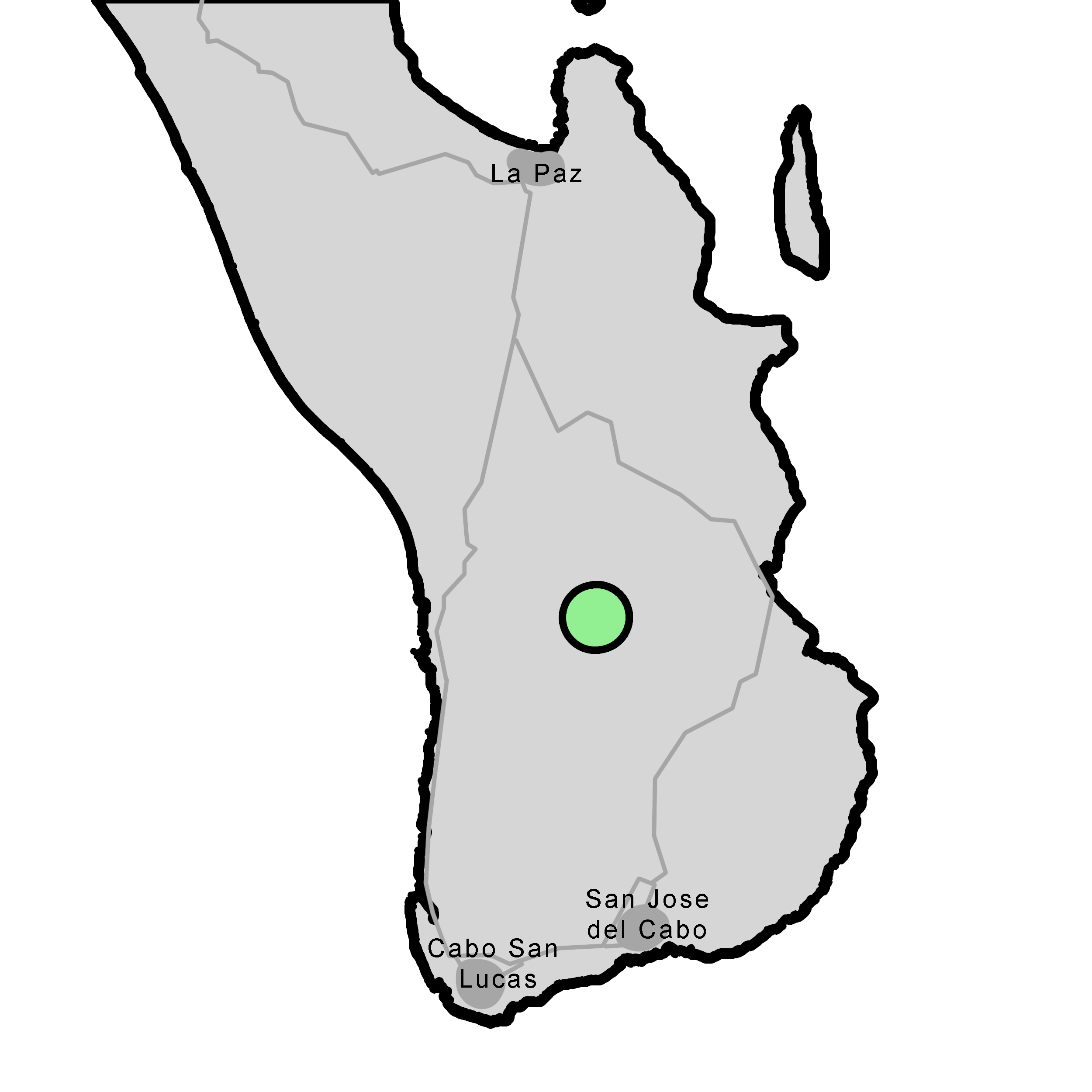
- Distribution of Dudleya rigida within Baja California Sur

Synonyms
- Echeveria rigida Berger

= Dudleya rigida =

Species of flowering plant

Dudleya rigida is a species of succulent perennial plant in the family Crassulaceae known commonly as the La Laguna liveforever. Characterized by a tall inflorescence with pendant yellowish-red flowers, it is a very rare plant whose existence was doubtful until botanist Reid Moran accidentally re-discovered it. It is endemic to the highest peaks of the Sierra de la Laguna in Baja California Sur, Mexico.

== Description ==
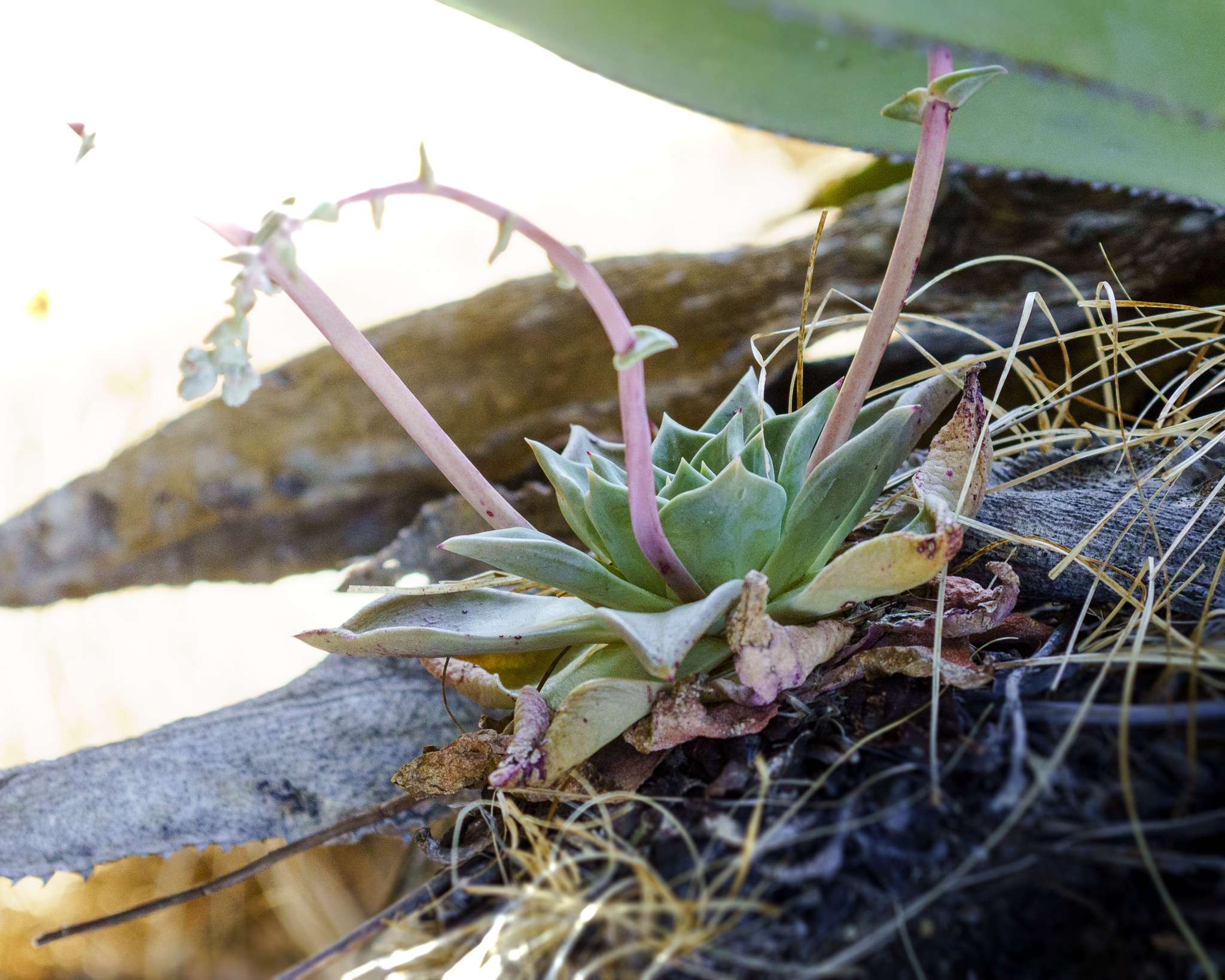
Dudleya rigida at La Aguja in the Sierra de la Laguna

Dudleya rigida has a caudex 1 to 3.5 cm thick, obscured by dried leaves, and branching into clusters with up to 20 rosettes. Rosettes are 6 to 15 cm (2.4 to 5.9 in) wide, with 10–25 leaves. Leaves are green or somewhat glaucous, and oblong to triangular-ovate, short-acuminate. The leaves are 5 to 8 cm (2.0 to 3.1 in) long, 2.5 to 4 cm wide, and 6 to 10 mm thick. The inflorescence has 8–21 flowers, with a yellow corolla marked in red and a pink to red peduncle. The flowers are pendent, a trait only shared by Dudleya anthonyi and Dudleya pulverulenta.

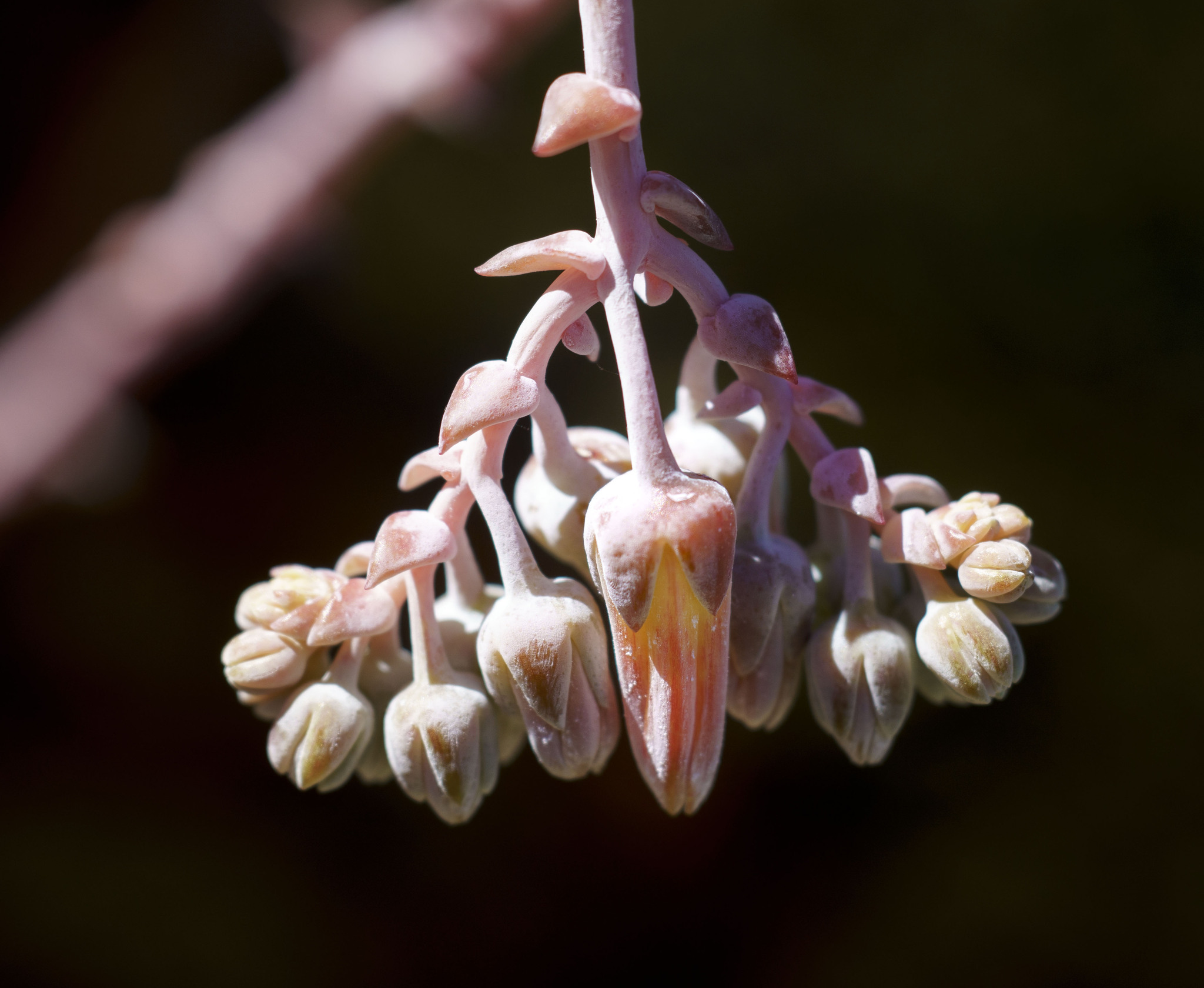
The flowers of Dudleya rigida

Compared with Dudleya nubigena, which has an overlapping range, Dudleya rigida has a thicker caudex, oblong leaves, a taller inflorescence, and is green, not farinose. The pollen grains are much larger than D. nubigena, because D. rigida possesses a much higher chromosome count. The plant is 16-ploid with a count of 136 chromosomes.

== Taxonomy ==
Joseph Nelson Rose named Dudleya rigida from a living specimen brought from Baja California by a J. E. McClelland. In his treatment, Rose gave no exact locality or date. The plant flowered in Washington by June 1897, but he never elaborated as to why he named it rigida. According to Edward W. Nelson, a J. Ellis McLellan collected birds and mammals in Baja California for the U.S. Biological Survey from March 31 to September 1895, visiting numerous locations of the Baja cape. Reid Moran inferred that based on the name of the collector, rigida must have originated somewhere in the Cape Region or the surrounding islands and mountains.

Pressed specimens were boiled and arranged in a way that obfuscated the true layout of the inflorescence. Fortunately, Frederick Andrews Walpole created a watercolor illustration of a living plant, albeit from a greenhouse collection. Curious about the existence of the plant, which had little documentation since Rose's treatment of the Dudleya genus, Reid Moran, on a journey to the Sierra de la Laguna, rediscovered the plant. Initially confused about the accidental discovery of a Dudleya on the 1900 meter high Cerro la Aguja, Moran recalled the existence of the Walpole plate and made the connection.

Moran managed to obtain more information about McLellan's journey to the cape, as an ornithologist with the USFWS sent him the handwritten notes, which mentioned that he had also explored the area near the Cerro la Aguja. Although McLellan never wrote about the collection of his specimen, Moran was able to confirm that the plants he discovered were the same as Rose's description. Moran did previously identify herbarium specimens of Dudleya rigida as being synonymous with Dudleya nubigena, but after his encounter with the plants in the wild, he changed his mind.

== Distribution and habitat ==
Dudleya rigida is native to the Sierra de la Laguna, growing on rocky outcroppings alongside Agave promontorii, Nolina beldingii, and Myrtillocactus cochal.

== See also ==
Montane species of Dudleya:

- Dudleya abramsii
- Dudleya nubigena
- Dudleya pauciflora
