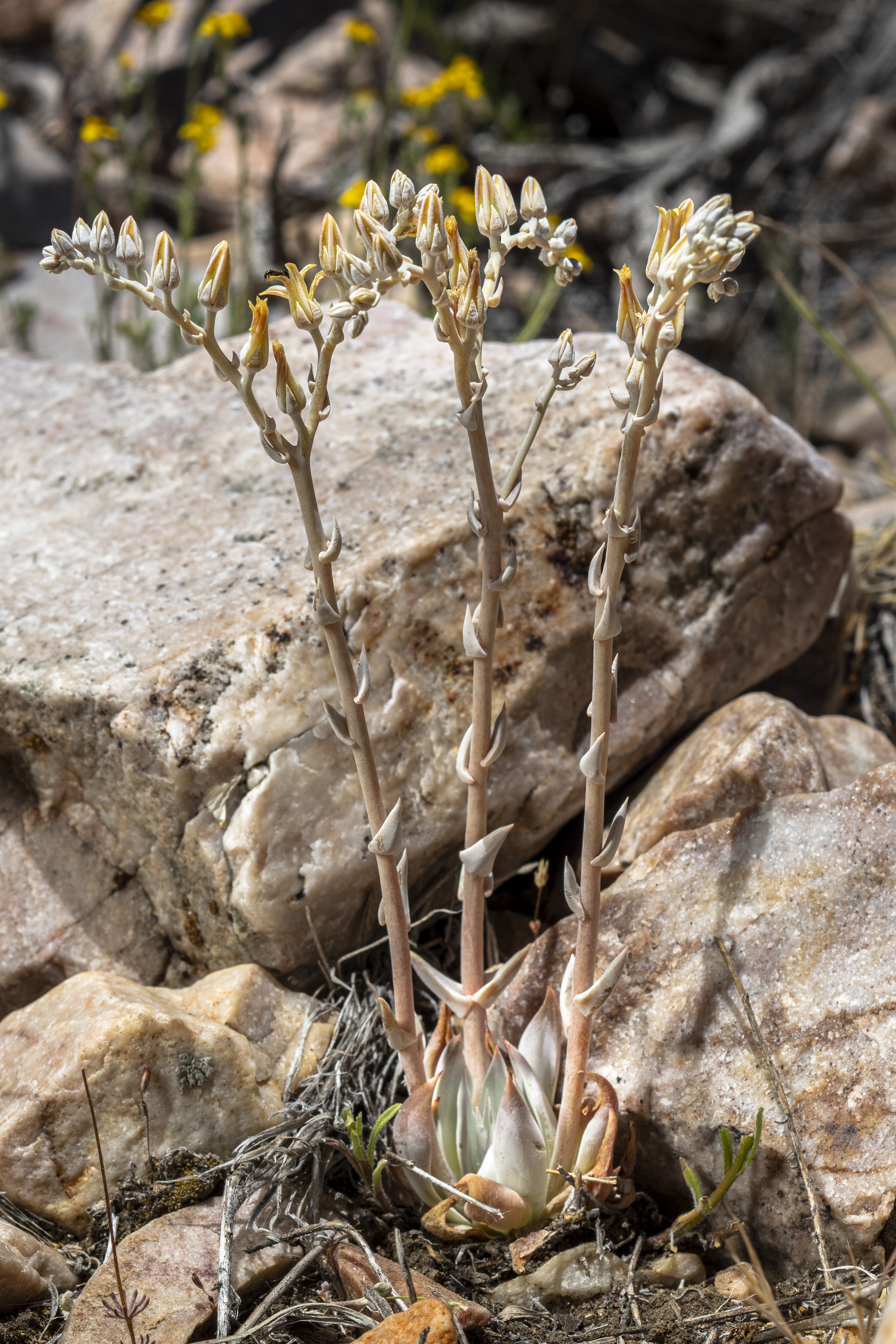
- Flowering in the San Bernardino Mountains

Conservation status
- Imperiled (NatureServe)

Scientific classification
- Kingdom: Plantae
- Clade: Embryophytes
- Clade: Tracheophytes
- Clade: Spermatophytes
- Clade: Angiosperms
- Clade: Eudicots
- Order: Saxifragales
- Family: Crassulaceae
- Genus: Dudleya
- Species: D. abramsii
- Subspecies: D. a. subsp. affinis

Trinomial name
- Dudleya abramsii subsp. affinis K.M. Nakai

Synonyms
- Dudleya affinis P.H. Thomson; Dudleya baldwinensis P.H. Thomson

= Dudleya abramsii subsp. affinis =

Subspecies of plant

Dudleya abramsii subsp. affinis, commonly known as the San Bernardino Mountains Dudleya, is a subspecies of succulent plant endemic to a portion of the San Bernardino Mountains in California. It is a plant with an unbranching stem and elliptical leaves occurring in Green Canyon and the nearby plateaus.

== Description ==
=== Morphology ===
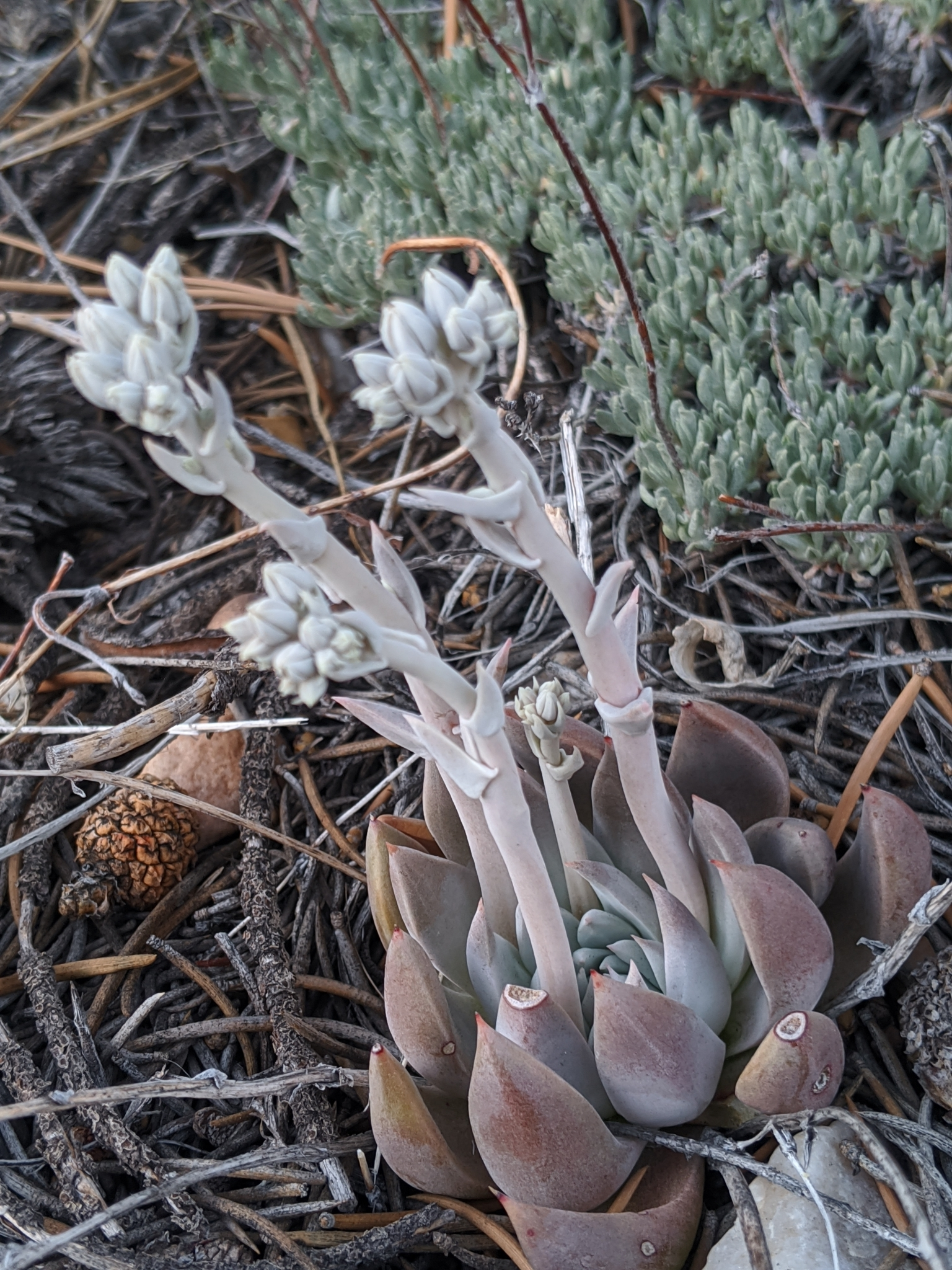
With developing inflorescence

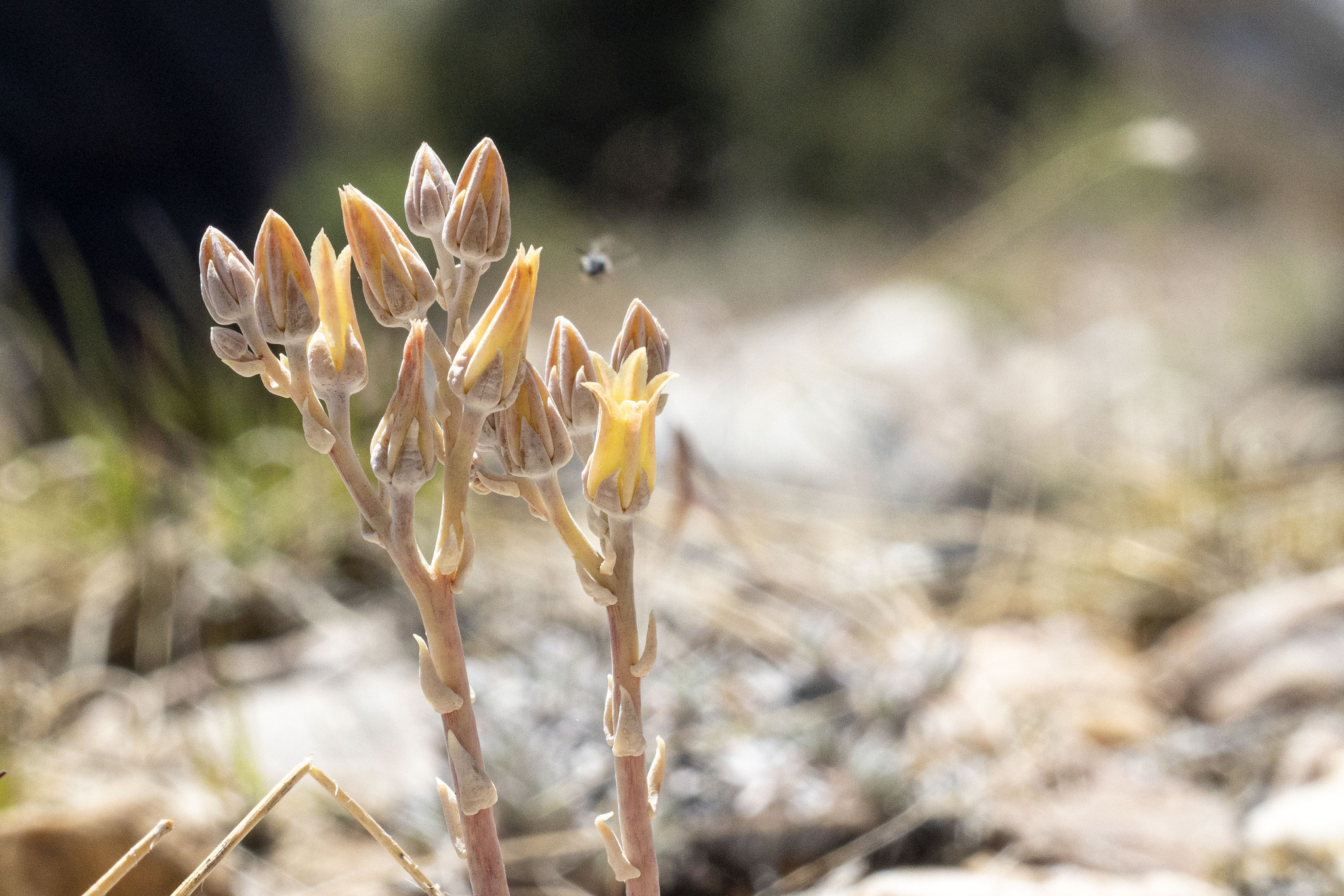
The flowers with a pollinator

This plant typically emerges from a singular rosette, with an unbranching and very short caudex 10 to 15 mm wide. The rosette is 3 to 6 cm wide, and is topped with leaves 2 to 4 cm long. The shape of the leaves is elliptic to oblanceolate, and they are usually 7 to 15 mm wide. On the inflorescence, the peduncle is 3 to 8 cm tall, and 1 to 3 mm wide. The lower bracts are 5 to 6 mm large, and the inflorescence branches off into a few simple, ascending branches, with 3 to 8 flowers per branch. The flowers have fused petals, and the keel of the flower is typically lined in red. The plant flowers from May through July.

== Taxonomy ==
=== Taxonomic history ===
This plant was first described by Kei M. Nakai, a botanist doing research on Dudleya. It is one of many subspecies of Dudleya abramsii. Some of the plants occurring near Baldwin Lake have been regarded by some authors as Dudleya baldwinensis. Plants with up to 50 rosettes occurring on limestone in Cushenbury Canyon may actually be Dudleya abramsii subsp. calcicola.

== Distribution and habitat ==
This species is found in the San Bernardino Mountains of Southern California, in Green Canyon, Cushenbury Canyon and the neighboring plateaus, along with the area around Baldwin Lake. It can be found on north-facing slopes from 1800 to 2600 meters in elevation, on outcrops of granitic and quartzite rocks.
