= Dudleya cymosa subsp. costatifolia =

Conservation status
- Critically Imperiled (NatureServe)

Scientific classification
- Kingdom: Plantae
- Clade: Embryophytes
- Clade: Tracheophytes
- Clade: Spermatophytes
- Clade: Angiosperms
- Clade: Eudicots
- Order: Saxifragales
- Family: Crassulaceae
- Genus: Dudleya
- Species: D. cymosa
- Subspecies: D. c. subsp. costatifolia

Trinomial name
- Dudleya cymosa subsp. costatifolia Bartel & Shevock, 1990

Synonyms
- Dudleya abramsii subsp. costafolia (Bartel & Shevock) Moran

Subspecies of succulent plant

Dudleya cymosa subsp. costatifolia, known commonly as the Pierpoint Springs dudleya or the Pierpoint Springs liveforever, is a species of succulent plant in the family Crassulaceae, narrowly endemic to a locality in Tulare County, California, United States. It is a clumping plant with small rosettes and bright yellow flowers, resembling alpine cushion plants.

== Description ==
=== Vegetative morphology ===
This species is a caespitose, clumping plant with small, densely packed rosettes only 1 to 5 cm wide. The caudex is short, much-branched, and 1.5 to 2 cm wide. Each rosette contains 7 to 15 erect, ascending leaves. The leaves are sublinear to linear-oblanceolate, with the tips acute to acuminate, 1 to 8 cm long and 2.5 to 7 mm wide, and 1.5 to 4 mm thick. The leaves are glaucous to glaucescent in age, and the adaxial (upper) surface of the leaves is usually plane to convex, with the leaf margins rounded except towards the base. The base of the leaf is 4.5 to 8 mm wide.

=== Reproductive morphology ===
The inflorescence is obpyramidal, with 2 to 4 mostly ascending branches that may rebranch 0 to 3 times. The terminal branches (circinate cincinni) are 1 to 4 mm long, and have 2 to 7 flowers. The peduncle is erect, and glaucous to glaucescent, 5 to 15 cm long, and 1.5 to 3.5 mm thick. It is bare of bracts in the lower 1 to 7 cm, with 5 to 20 bracts in total. The bracts are ascending to spreading, shaped triangular lanceolate, and have tips acute to acuminate, with the lowermost bracts 4 to 30 mm long, and 2 to 6 mm wide. The pedicels are erect, 2.5 to 9 mm long, and 1.2 to 1.5 mm in diameter.

The calyx is sub-truncate to tapering below, and is 4 to 6 mm long, 4 to 6 mm wide. The sepals are appressed, and shaped triangular-ovate, with acute tips, 2 to 5 mm long and 2 to 4 mm wide, and usually slightly glaucescent. The corolla is bright yellow, basally connate 1 to 3 mm, with the petals erect, spreading at the apex, and shaped lanceolate to narrowly acute, 5 to 13 mm long, 2 to 4 mm wide. The filaments are yellow, with the petal-aligned filaments 3 to 5 mm long, and the ones aligned with the sepals ones 3 to 7 mm long. The nectaries are white to yellowish, 0.5 to 1 mm long. There are 20 to 50 ovules per carpel.

The seeds are brown, 0.5 to 0.7 mm long, and less than or equal to 0.2 mm wide, with striations along the longitudinal axis. Flowering is from May to June.

== Taxonomy ==
=== Taxonomic history ===
The plant was discovered by James R. Shevock on an expedition searching for range extensions of uncommon calciphyte plants. It was later described by Shevock along with Jim Bartel in a 1990 edition of Aliso. Paul H. Thomson placed this species as Dudleya costafolia, but as he did not follow the International Code of Botanical Nomenclature's publication guidelines, most of Thomson's Dudleya revisions have been invalidated. In 2007, Reid Venable Moran placed it as a subspecies of Dudleya abramsii, as Dudleya abramsii subsp. costifolia. Moran believed that due to the caespitose habit, it would be better suited as a subspecies Dudleya abramsii. Both Dudleya abramsii and Dudleya cymosa are polyphyletic complexes of species. The 2012 Jepson eFlora treatment by botanist and Dudleya expert Stephen W. McCabe place this species as Dudleya cymosa subsp. costatifolia.

=== Nomenclature ===
The correct spelling of the specific epithet is costatifolia, with the orthographic variant costafolia. Rejected spellings of the epithet include:

- costafolia
- costifolia
- costaefolia
- costiformifolia

=== Characteristics ===
Compared to the nearby Dudleya abramsii subsp. calcicola, this species produces bright yellow flowers, not pale yellow ones. The rosette leaves also differ, with costatifolia producing linear to linear-oblancelate leaves, not oblong-lanceolate leaves. Compared to Dudleya abramsii in general, it lacks the characteristic red striations on the keel, and it lacks the simpler, bifurcated inflorescences. The caespitose habit and exceedingly narrow leaves separate it as a whole from other Dudleya cymosa species. It does share several characteristics with nearby Dudleya cymosa subsp. cymosa, including similar epicuticular waxes and floral morphology.

== Distribution and habitat ==
This species is narrowly distributed to the type locality in Tulare County, on a xeric southwest-facing pre-Cretaceous limestone outcrop. The single population occurs on private land within the Sequoia National Forest, and is on relatively inaccessible habitat. Nearby limestone outcrops do not bear this species, but Dudleya cymosa subsp. cymosa. It occurs in association with Hesperoyucca whipplei, Cercocarpus montanus, and Boechera sparsiflora.

== Horticulture ==
In cultivation, plants continue to produce densely packed rosettes. It can be easily grown from offsets and seed.
