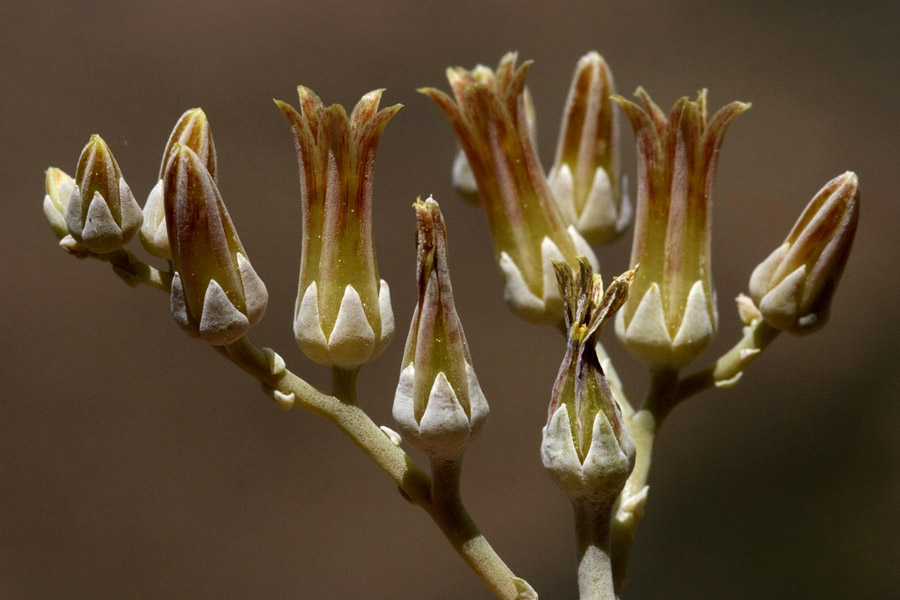
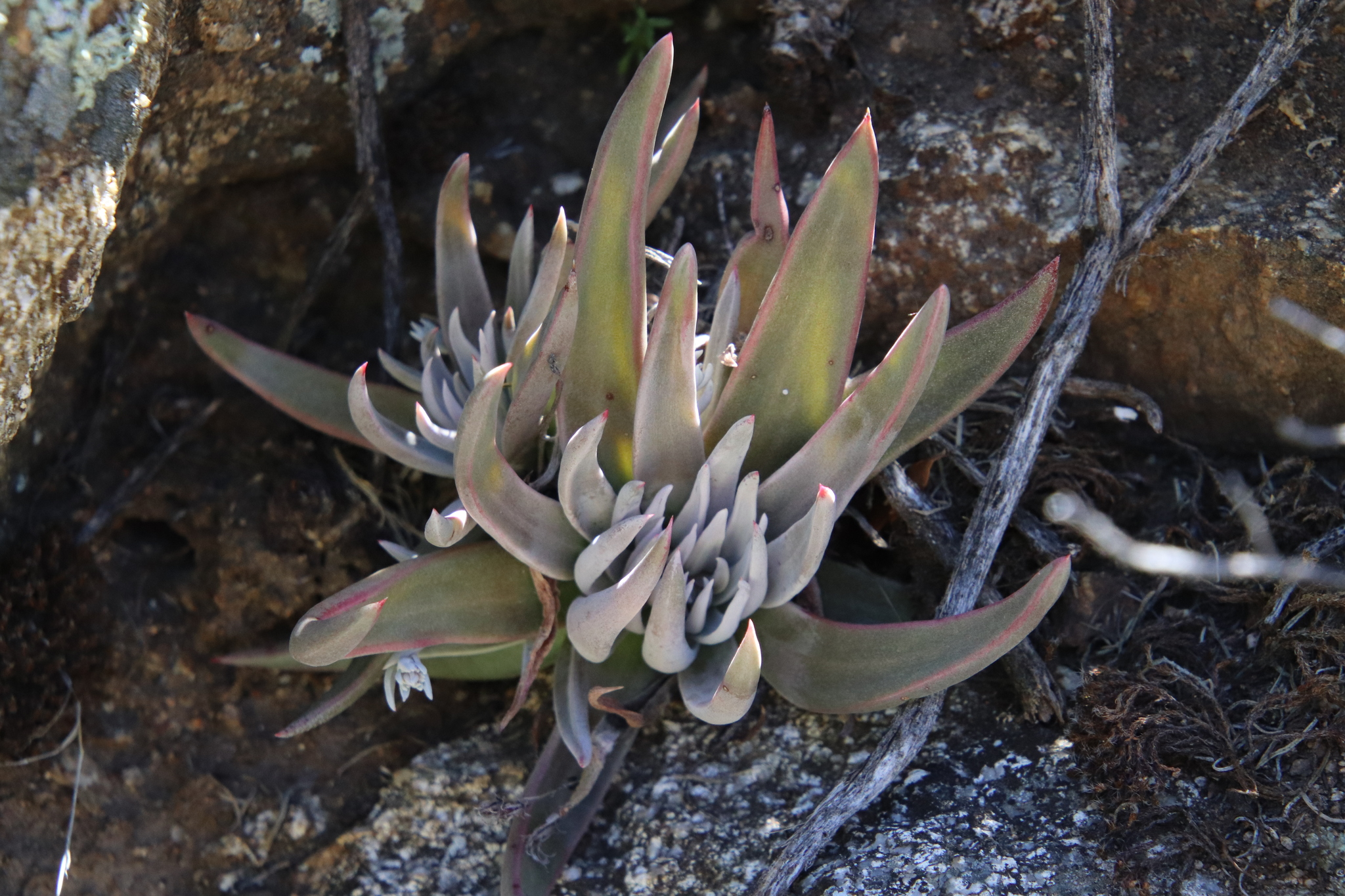
- Flowers (top) and basal leaves (bottom)

Conservation status
- Imperiled (NatureServe)

Scientific classification
- Kingdom: Plantae
- Clade: Embryophytes
- Clade: Tracheophytes
- Clade: Spermatophytes
- Clade: Angiosperms
- Clade: Eudicots
- Order: Saxifragales
- Family: Crassulaceae
- Genus: Dudleya
- Species: D. abramsii
- Subspecies: D. a. subsp. abramsii

Trinomial name
- Dudleya abramsii subsp. abramsii Rose

Synonyms
- Cotyledon setchellii Jeps.; Dudleya tenuis Rose; Echeveria tenuis (Rose) A.Berger

= Dudleya abramsii subsp. abramsii =

Subspecies of succulent plant

Dudleya abramsii subsp. abramsii is a species of succulent plant in the family Crassulaceae known by the common name as Abrams' liveforever. It is a small, delicate plant found growing among rocks, and is characterized by yellow flowers with a red tinge that emerge from May to July. It is native to the southern Sierra Nevada of California and the Peninsular Ranges across both the United States and Mexico.

== Description ==
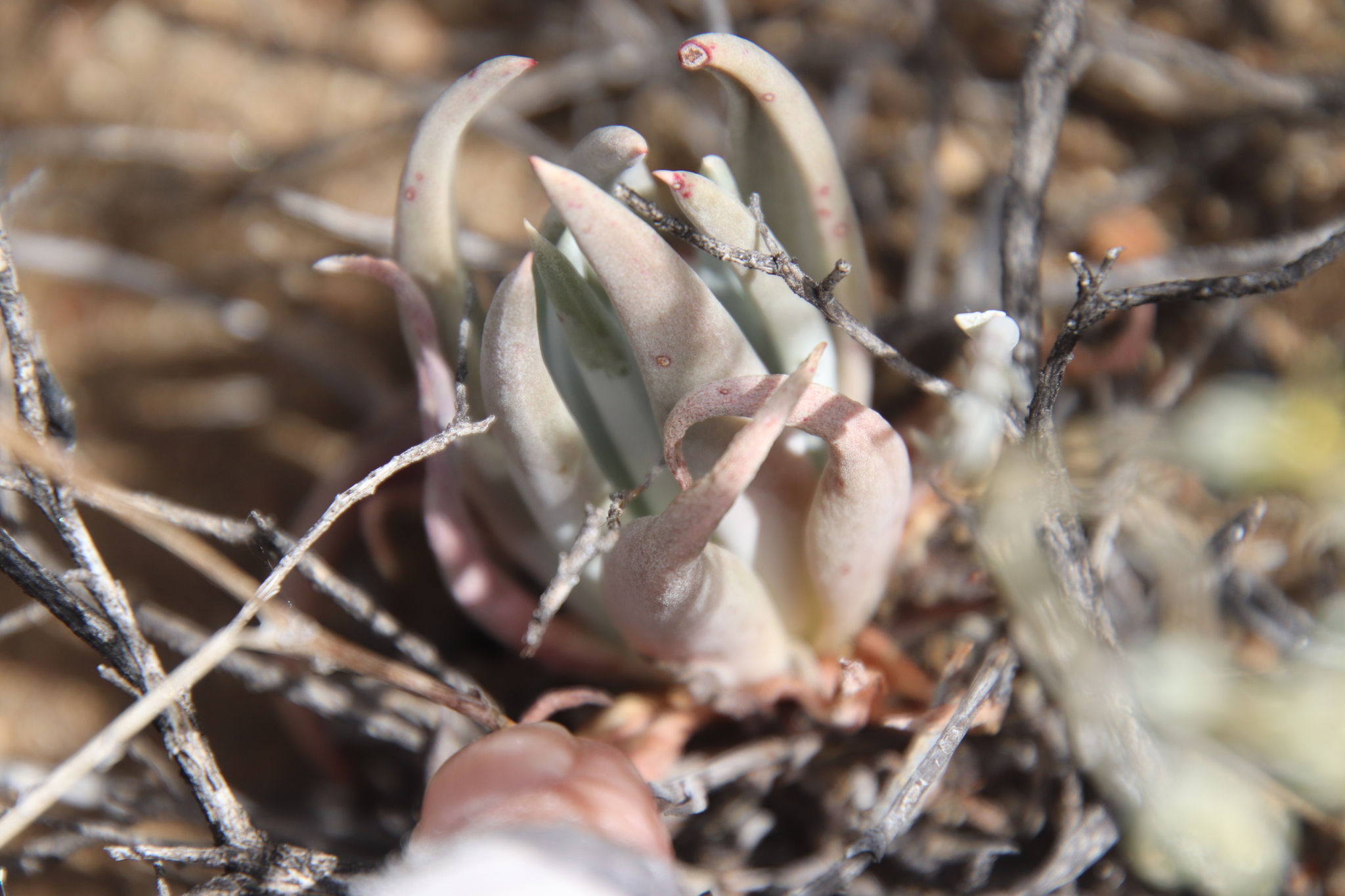
The narrow rosette of a dormant plant

The plant grows out of a thick caudex, 0.3 to 2 cm wide, topped by up to 50 small, dense rosettes, 1 to 9 cm wide. The leaves are small, around 1 to 6 cm long, 2 to 9 mm wide. The shape of the leaves is somewhat variable, as they may be lance-oblong to lanceolate, or subcylindrical, with the tips acute to subacuminate. The leaves are a dull gray-green to bluish-green or very rarely dull-red or white in color, and are somewhat glaucous. During dormancy, the plant's horizontal leaves fold upwards into a narrow rosette.

Few to many flower stalks emerge from the oldest and lowest leaves on the plant. The peduncle is typically 2 to 18 mm tall, 1 to 5 mm wide. Bracts on the inflorescence are clustered towards the bottom, being persistent, while bracts higher up in the stalk are spaced further and are not persistent. Lower bracts are 4 to 15 mm long and taper evenly to a sharp point. The inflorescence branches 2 to 3 times, and is generally ascending and spreading. 2 to 15 flowers are held on the branches, suspended by pedicels 0.5 to 7 mm long. The tiny flowers are the color of straw, with the keel striped with red. The flowers are 9 to 15 mm long.

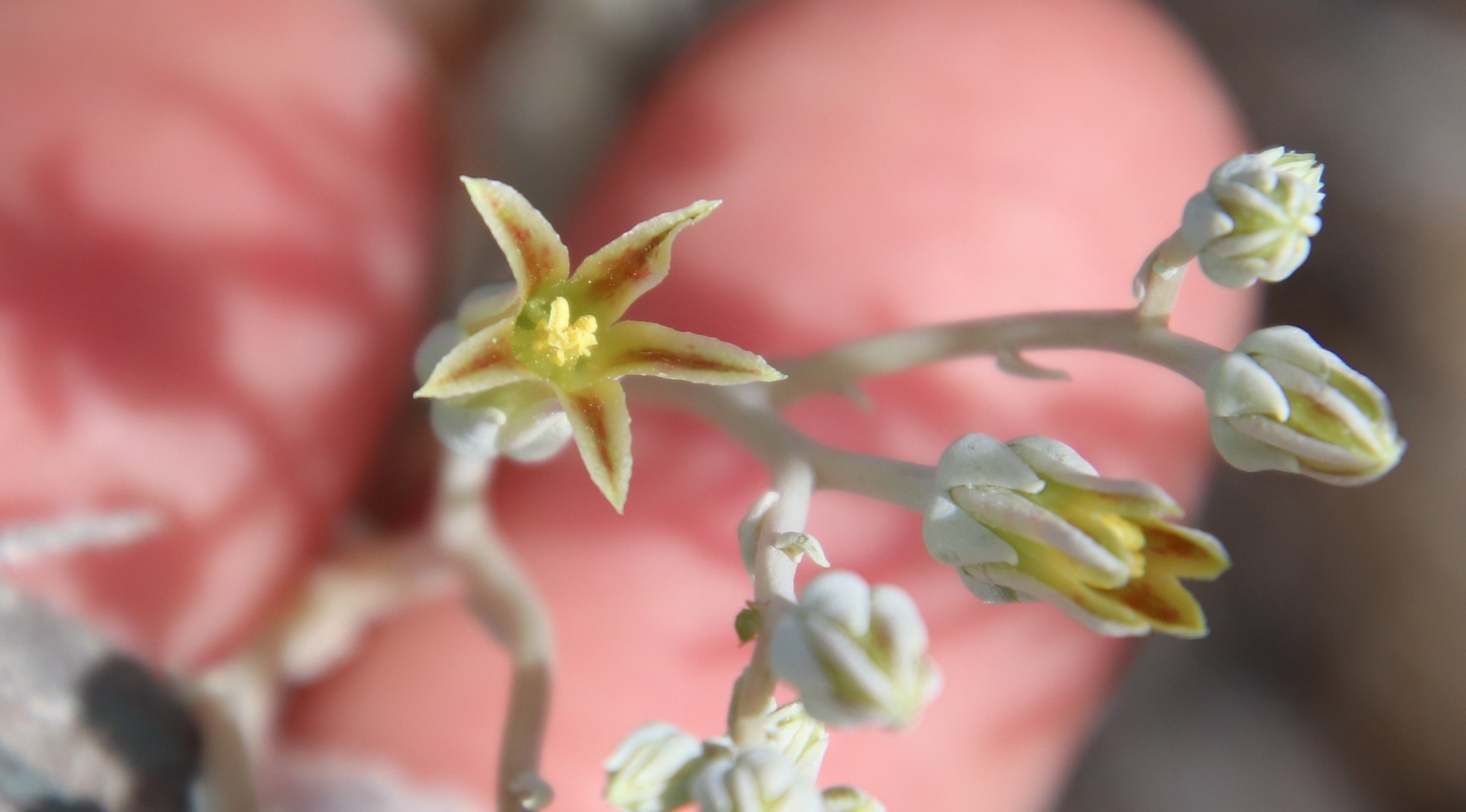
The flowers

This species is one of the few in the genus Dudleya that can withstand freezing temperatures and lower, owing to its montane adaptations. It occurs in somewhat similar habitats as Dudleya saxosa, but can be distinguished by the fact that saxosa has much more robust, larger flower stalks in many colors with red or orange flowers.

The chromosome number is 17. The plant flowers from May to July, variably with elevation.

== Taxonomy ==
This plant was described as part of Nathaniel Lord Britton and Joseph Nelson Rose's treatment of the genus Dudleya in 1903. The plants in the southern Sierra Nevada were formerly placed in Dudleya abramsii ssp. calcicola, but revised treatments have shown that calcicola is limited to limestone, while the plants on granite are in abramsii.

=== Etymology ===
The epithet abramsii commemorates LeRoy Abrams.

== Distribution and habitat ==
The plant primarily occurs in the southern Sierra Nevada of California and the Peninsular Ranges of southern California and Baja California. Its distribution in the Peninsular Ranges occurs in the north from the San Jacinto Mountains to Mount Laguna and Jacumba, down into the Sierra Juarez and the Sierra de San Pedro Martir. It can be found at elevations of 750 to 2200 meters.

Although the plant occurs in a few selected locales, where it is found it may be abundant. It is one of the smaller Dudleya that can often be seen growing in crevices of granite rocks or in the detritus at the base of rocks on north-facing hillsides or under shaded trees. Due to its small size and habit it may elude naturalists looking for the plant.

== Cultivation ==
This plant is not well-suited to pot culture, but may thrive if planted in a crevice between granite rocks and left alone. Plants placed between rocks in an effort to mimic the natural habitat will survive and flower for many years. The plants must be shaded during the hottest months of the year, as they may live only 2 to 3 years in full sun. They are also vulnerable to pests that may eat the stem, destroying the meristem and killing the plant.
