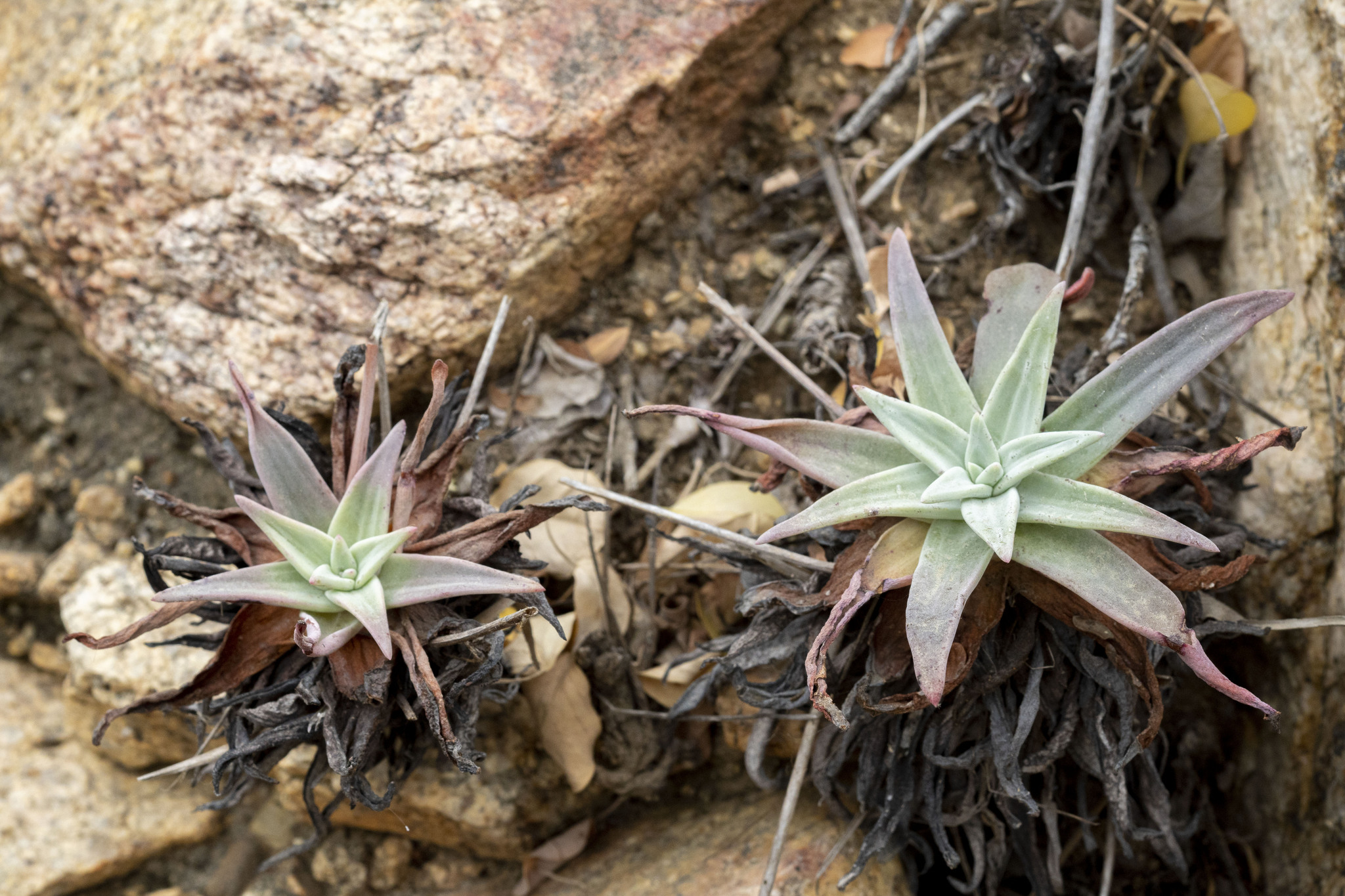
- Dudleya nubigena subsp. nubigena at Cabo San Lucas

Scientific classification
- Kingdom: Plantae
- Clade: Tracheophytes
- Clade: Angiosperms
- Clade: Eudicots
- Order: Saxifragales
- Family: Crassulaceae
- Genus: Dudleya
- Species: D. nubigena

Binomial name
- Dudleya nubigena (Brandegee) Britton & Rose

Synonyms
- Cotyledon nubigena Brandegee; Dudleya nubigena subsp. cerralvensis Moran; Dudleya xanti Rose; Echeveria nubigena (Brandegee) A.Berger; Echeveria xantii (Rose) A.Berger

= Dudleya nubigena =

Species of succulent plant from Mexico

Dudleya nubigena is a species of succulent plants in the family Crassulaceae. It is a rosette forming perennial with flattish leaves. Endemic to southern Baja California Sur, the species is found in the Sierra de la Laguna and the surrounding lowlands, a small southern portion of the Sierra de la Giganta, and on Isla Espíritu Santo, with a subspecies endemic to Cerralvo Island.

== Description ==
=== Morphology ===
==== Vegetative characteristics ====
The caudex is at most 7 cm high, typically unbranched, unless in montane areas. The rosettes are mostly solitary, 4 to 18 cm wide, with 10 to 22 crowded leaves, but up to 30 in cultivation. The rosette leaves are typically farinose, but may sometimes present as green. The leaves are triangular-lanceolate to oblong-obovate, acute to acuminate, and often apiculate. The leaves measure 3 to 10 cm long, 1.5 to 3 cm wide, 2 to 4 mm thick, flattish, but also channeled ventrally. The base of the leaves are 1 to 2 cm wide, with the margins becoming acute near the base, obtuse to rounded above.

==== Reproductive characteristics ====
The peduncle is 10 to 30 cm tall to the cyme, 1.5 to 5mm thick, colored pink to red and often glaucous, with a variable shape depending on the subspecies. The lower 2 to 12 cm of the peduncle is bare, with 5 to 23 bracts starting above, ascending, triangular-ovate to -lanceolate, with the lower bracts 4 to 30 mm long, 3 to 12 mm wide. The cyme is commonly pinkish and glaucous, composed of 2 to 3 branches that bifurcate up to two times. The cincinni have 4 to 24 flowers, and in cultivation they open at intervals of 2 to 5 days, staying open for 5 to 6 days.

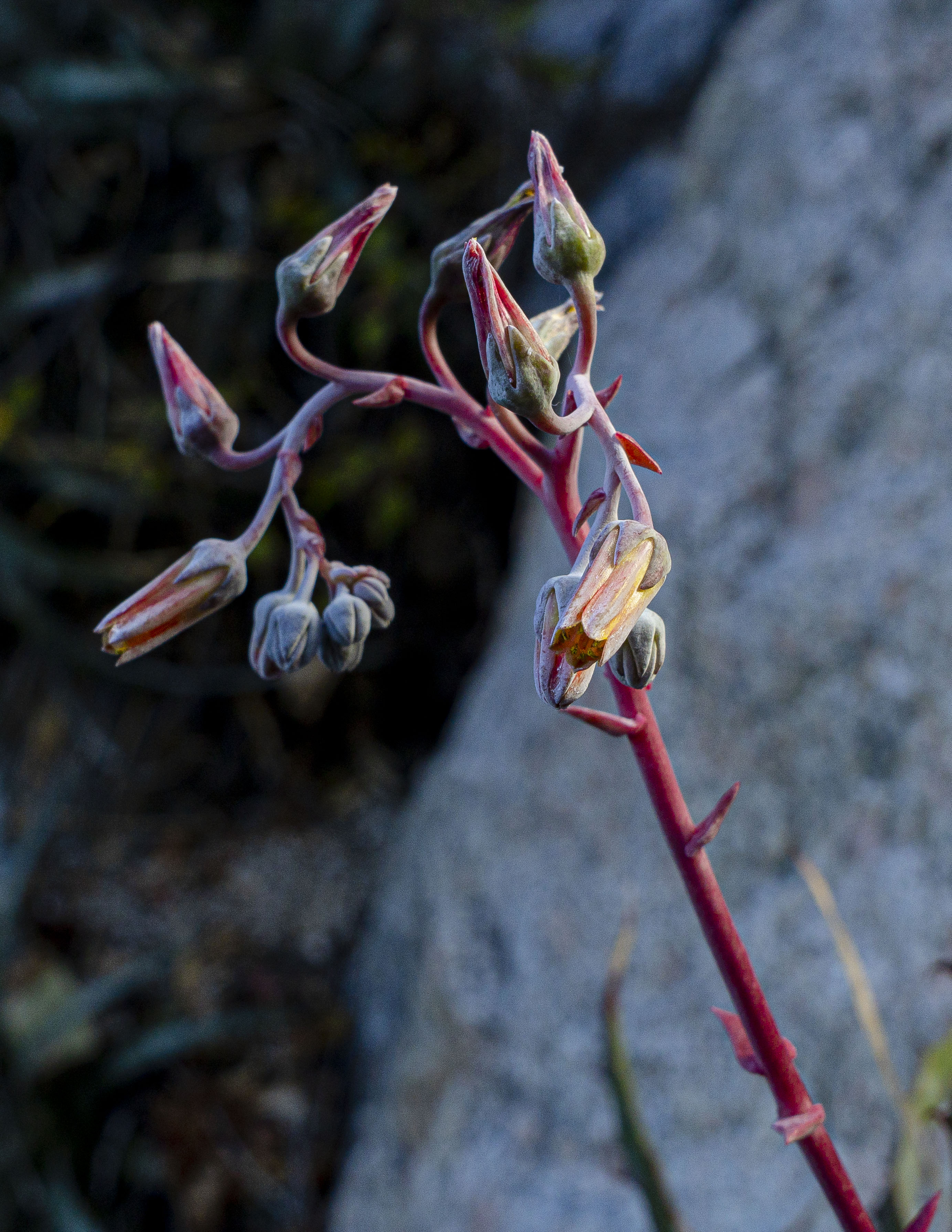
Inflorescence of the montane form with pendent flowers and erect fruits, Sierra de las Cacachilas.

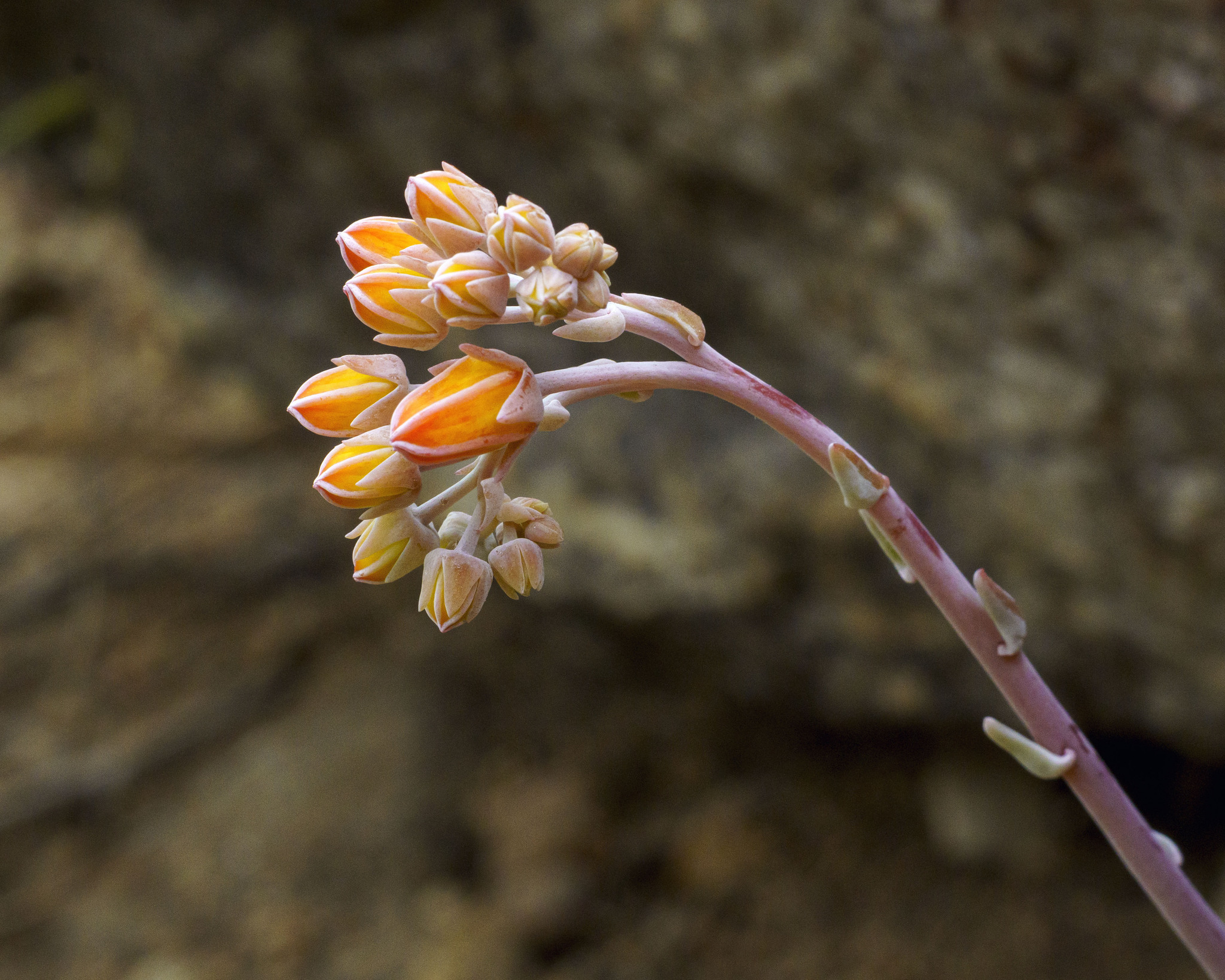
The inflorescence of the lowland form of Dudleya nubigena subsp. nubigena, at the type locality for Dudleya xantii.

The pedicels are pinkish, and variable in behavior based on the subspecies, 8 to 25 mm long, but becoming up to 40mm long in cultivation. Pedicels are also 1 to 1.5mm thick at the base, thickening upwards. Plants flower in December through April, and in anthesis and fruit the pedicels become more or less erect. The calyx is green to red in coloration, 3 to 6 mm long, 4 to 6 mm wide, sub-truncate to rounded below, with the disk 4 to 5 mm wide. The sinuses on the calyx are sometimes U-shaped at anthesis, and V-shaped to closed. The segments of the calyx are deltoid, acute, 2 to 5 mm long, 2 to 3.5 mm wide. The segments are commonly erect or ascending at anthesis, with tips 0.5 to 2 mm from the corolla. The tips usually become appressed after anthesis, but may become appressed at anthesis in the montane forms.

The corolla is pyramidal with the sides nearly flat, 7 to 10 mm long, and elongating by 1 to 1.5 mm during anthesis, 4 to 6 mm wide at the base, becoming often wide than the calyx disk, 2.5 to 4mm wide at the apex, and colored a yellow to mostly orange or coral red, with the keels glaucous. The tube is 2.5 to 5.5 mm long. The segments are oblong, obtuse to broadly acute, 1.5 to 2.5 mm wide. The filaments are not quite cylindrical in cross section, light yellow, 5 to 8 mm long from the corolla base, adnate 2 to 4 mm. The anthers are oblong-lanceolate, 1.5 to 2 mm long, 0.6 to 0.7 mm wide, light yellow. Nectar glands are white, around 0.25 mm high, 1 to 1.5 mm wide, 0.3 to 0.5 mm thick radially. The gynoecium is 5 to 9 mm high, 2.5 to 3 mm thick, with the pistils erect, appressed, and connate to around 0.5 to 1.0 mm, greenish, with the ovaries oblong and tapering rather abruptly to yellowish or reddish styles 1 to 1.5 mm long. There are 50 to 110 ovules, around 0.5 mm long and 0.2 mm thick. The seeds are brown, narrowly ovoid, acute, longitudinally striated, and roughly 0.5 to 0.7 mm long.

The chromosome count is 17.

== Taxonomy ==
=== Taxonomic history ===
This species was described by Townshend Stith Brandegee, the first botanist to explore the mountains of the Sierra de la Laguna. He found the plant flowering on the rocks at the summit of the mountains and named it a year later, in 1891, as Cotyledon nubigena. The name nubigena implies cloudy summits, but despite this, Brandegee also recognized many plants at sea level near San Jose del Cabo.

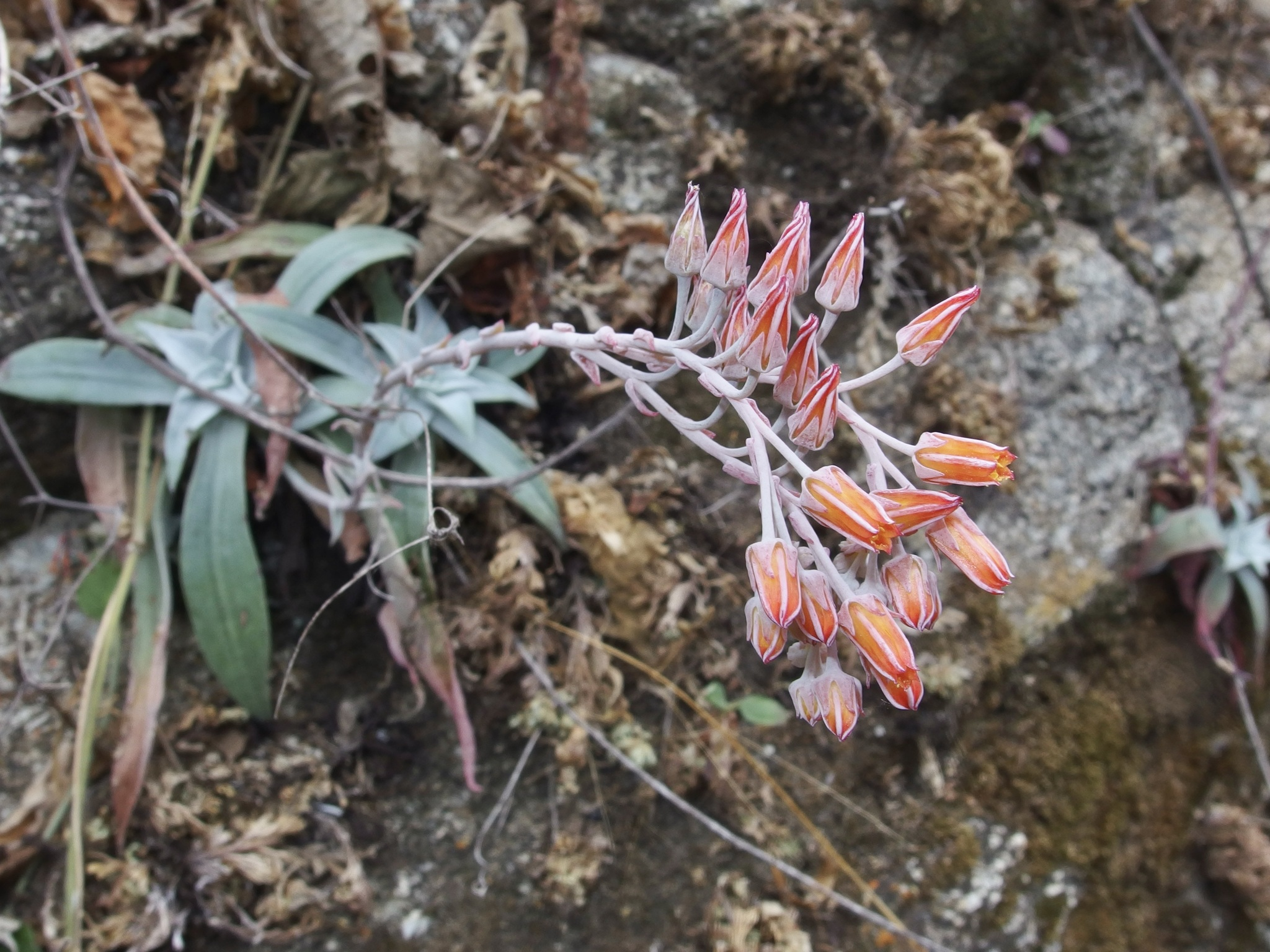
Montane form with pendent flowers and erect fruits, Sierra de la Laguna.

When Joseph Nelson Rose and Nathaniel Lord Britton were creating the genus Dudleya, Rose made the decision to separate the lowland plants as Dudleya xanti. The species xanti was named for L. J. Xantus de Vesey, a tidal observer at Cabo San Lucas for the U.S. Coast Guard Survey from 1859 to 1861. While at Cabo, Xantus traveled around collecting samples of plants, and among them was a specimen of Dudleya. Asa Gray's 1861 account of the Xantus plant collections places the Dudleya specimens as Echeveria farinosa (which is now Dudleya farinosa). While Rose's descriptions showed that xanti was a smaller plant than nubigena, Reid Moran noted that the claims made by Rose to differentiate the two were unsubstantiated, with the many specimens being hardly distinguishable. Moran then included Dudleya xanti back into Dudleya nubigena.

Moran later described the subspecies Dudleya nubigena ssp. cerralvensis, an endemic of Cerralvo Island, occurring only in a few canyons shielded from the hot climate. He notes in his assessment the difficulty of describing Dudleya when comparing wild specimens with cultivated ones, stating that the morphological difference between a wild and cultivated plant may appear to be as great as two different species. Paul H. Thomson, author of the Dudleya and Hasseanthus Handbook, retains Dudleya xanti as a separate species, but does not substantiate his claim as to why. Thomson's authority on Dudleya has been noted as unreliable by Moran.

=== Subdivisions ===
- Dudleya nubigena subsp. nubigena Britton & Rose (1903) – (Cape liveforever)
- Dudleya nubigena subsp. cerralvensis Moran (1969) – (Cerralvo liveforever)

== Distribution and habitat ==
The mainland species occurs throughout the Cape region of Baja California Sur both along the coast and in the Sierra de la Laguna and the Sierra de las Cacachilas. It is also found in the far southern end of the Sierra de la Giganta, the Cerro Mechudo, and also on Isla Espíritu Santo. Subspecies cerralvensis is very rare and only known from a few populations in cool canyons on Cerralvo Island.

== See also ==
Dudleya rigida – One of the other Dudleyas occurring in the Sierra de La Laguna.
