= Frederick Andrews Walpole =

American botanical illustrator

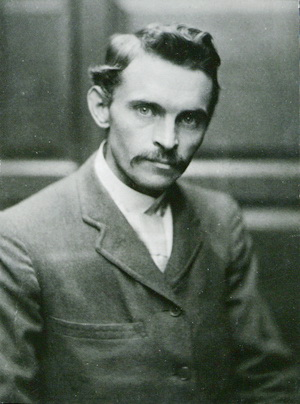

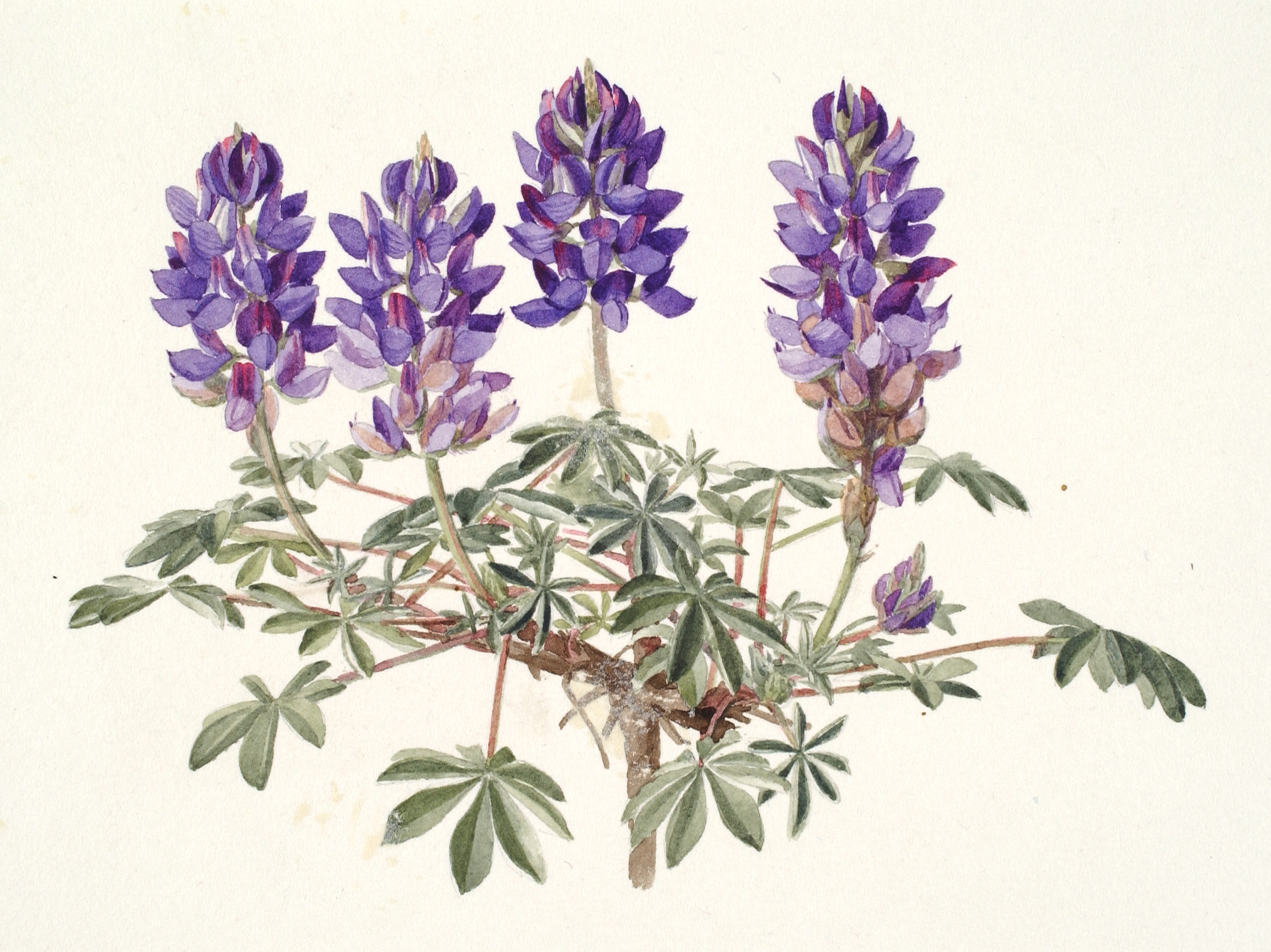
Lupinus minimus

Frederick Andrews Walpole (17 January 1861 Port Douglas, Essex County, New York - 11 May 1904 California) was a botanical illustrator employed by the United States Department of Agriculture.

Walpole's documented life is fragmentary. In 1871 his family relocated to Chicago where Frederick studied under an artist named Sloan, possibly Junius R. Sloan (1827–1900), a landscape and portrait painter of the period. In 1882 Walpole left Chicago and journeyed by rail to Southern Oregon to acquire land for a homestead. One of his journals records that on arriving at Redding, California in the Sacramento Valley on 22 March, he found the stage fare of $36.00 to Jacksonville beyond his means. He accordingly freighted his luggage ahead and walked the 177 miles remaining. After combing the area, he settled on land near the present town of Trail in the Crater Lake region.

Walpole's known journals do not cover the period 1884 to 1899, but it is known that Walpole's family settled in Portland, Oregon. where, In 1886 Frederick found employment as illustrator at the Lewis & Dryden Printing Company. In 1891/2 he made the acquaintance of an English girl who was visiting in Oregon and duly married her in England in 1893. Their only child, Sidney, was born in 1894. In 1898 Walpole's wife was struck down by typhoid fever while in Washington, D.C., as was he in May 1904 in California. Walpole's work drew the attention of Frederick Vernon Coville (1867–1937) in 1896. Coville was a United States Department of Agriculture (USDA) botanist and herbarium curator, who at that time was in Oregon documenting plants found useful by the Klamath Indians. Encouraged by Coville, Walpole applied for the position of artist at USDA's Division of Botany, and was duly appointed on 19 September. His journals record his going on botanical field trips, drawing, botanising, and collecting specimens of plants which he readily identified by their Latin names. In Walpole's obituary it is noted that the Victorian polymath John Ruskin (1819–1900) was a favorite author of his and quite likely inspired and influenced him.

Walpole's workplace as a botanical illustrator was initially in Washington, D.C., at the USDA, and after November 1902 at the National Museum - he also went on field trips to the Northwest. His journals for the period 1900–1903 dealt with his work in Washington, D.C., and his expeditions across the country, as well as two trips to Alaska in 1900 and 1901. He also kept details of railroad timetables and shipping schedules, descriptions of terrain, weather reports, his movements and work carried out, and meticulous records of his finances, detailing the purchase of newspapers and magazines, even of toothpicks and a tip to an urchin of one cent.

He also kept notes on his lively social life, recording visits to family and friends, birthdays and holidays and attendance at science lectures, music recitals, frequent visits to Washington's Corcoran Gallery, the Congress and the Library of Congress, church (Unitarian, if available, but Greek Orthodox in Alaska). A span of the journals from November 1902 to January 1903 listed the following activities: two visits to Zoological Park; showing his own pictures (along with Louis Agassiz Fuertes, the famous bird artist, and Charles Robert Knight, the animal artist) at an American Ornithological Union meeting; lecture by Robert Peary on his arctic work; Jane Addams' lecture at Congregational Church; recital by Mme. Ernestine Schumann-Heink; Corcoran Gallery exhibition; visit to Library of Congress; lecture on wingless birds; another on protective coloring; another on Martinique; reading Owen Wister's The Virginian; meeting of the Folk Lore society; reception of the American Association for the Advancement of Science; music recital at Unitarian Church; Hagenbeck's Trained Animal Show; ping pong party across the street. Considering that he was a member of the American Association for the Advancement of Science, the National Geographic Society and the Biological Society of Washington, we might say that Frederick Walpole was a man firmly devoted to the American virtue of participation and self-improvement.

— Hunt Institute

His journal records on the Alaska trips painted quite a different picture: Walpole concentrating on his work, enjoying spectacles of glaciers and mountains, recording details of natives and fellow travelers, and affording an insight into the man.
