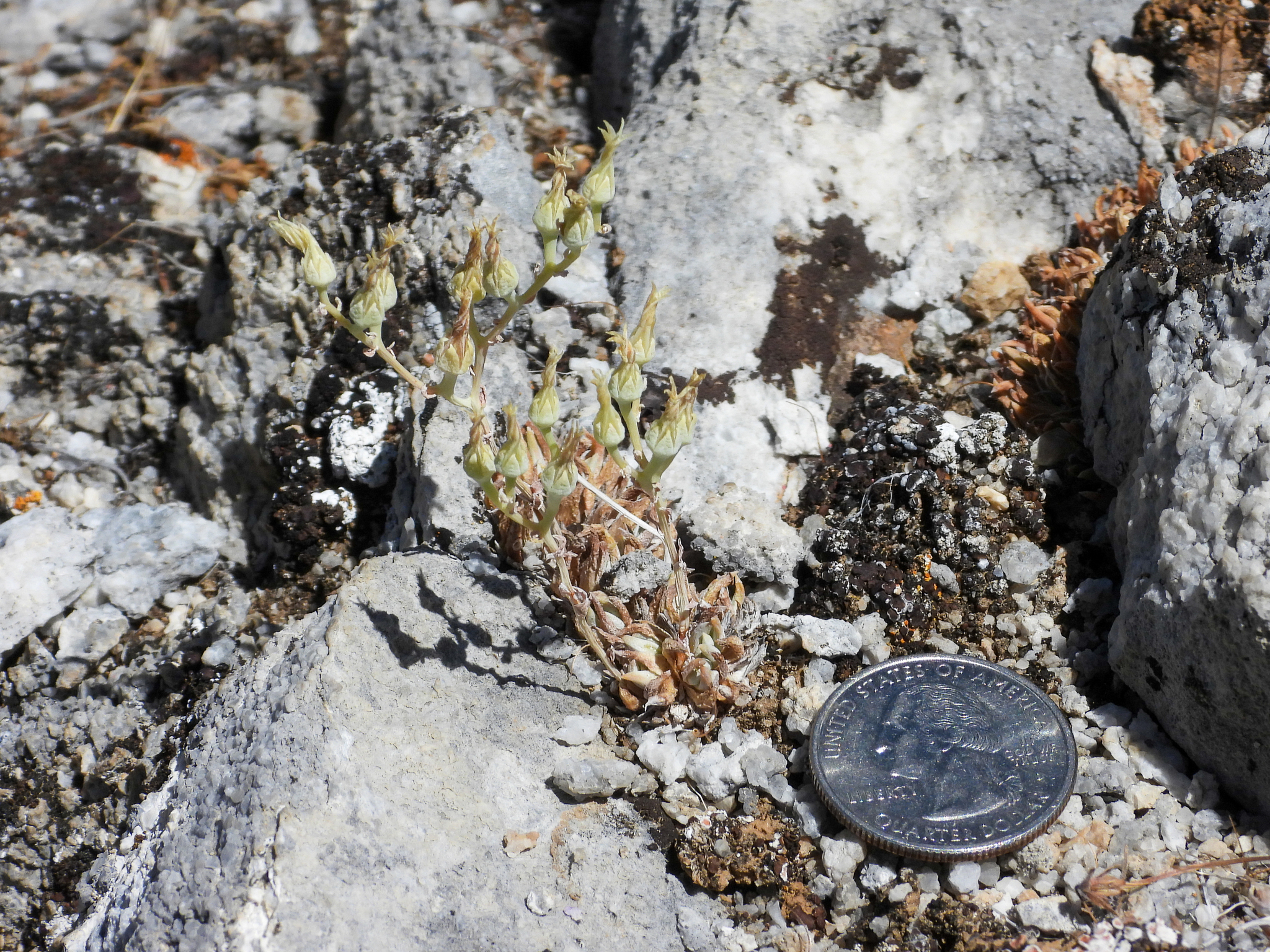
- The species at the end of its bloom, with a US quarter for scale.

Conservation status
- Apparently Secure (NatureServe)

Scientific classification
- Kingdom: Plantae
- Clade: Embryophytes
- Clade: Tracheophytes
- Clade: Spermatophytes
- Clade: Angiosperms
- Clade: Eudicots
- Order: Saxifragales
- Family: Crassulaceae
- Genus: Dudleya
- Species: D. abramsii
- Subspecies: D. a. subsp. calcicola

Trinomial name
- Dudleya abramsii subsp. calcicola (Bartel & Shevock) K.M. Nakai

Synonyms
- Dudleya calcicola Bartel & Shevock

= Dudleya abramsii subsp. calcicola =

Species of succulent

Dudleya abramsii subsp. calcicola is a succulent plant known by the common name limestone liveforever, or limestone dudleya. It is endemic to California, where it is a rare resident of limestone outcroppings and rocky slopes in the southern Sierra Nevada and nearby mountains and foothills. It was formerly regarded as Dudleya calcicola.

== Description ==
=== Morphology ===
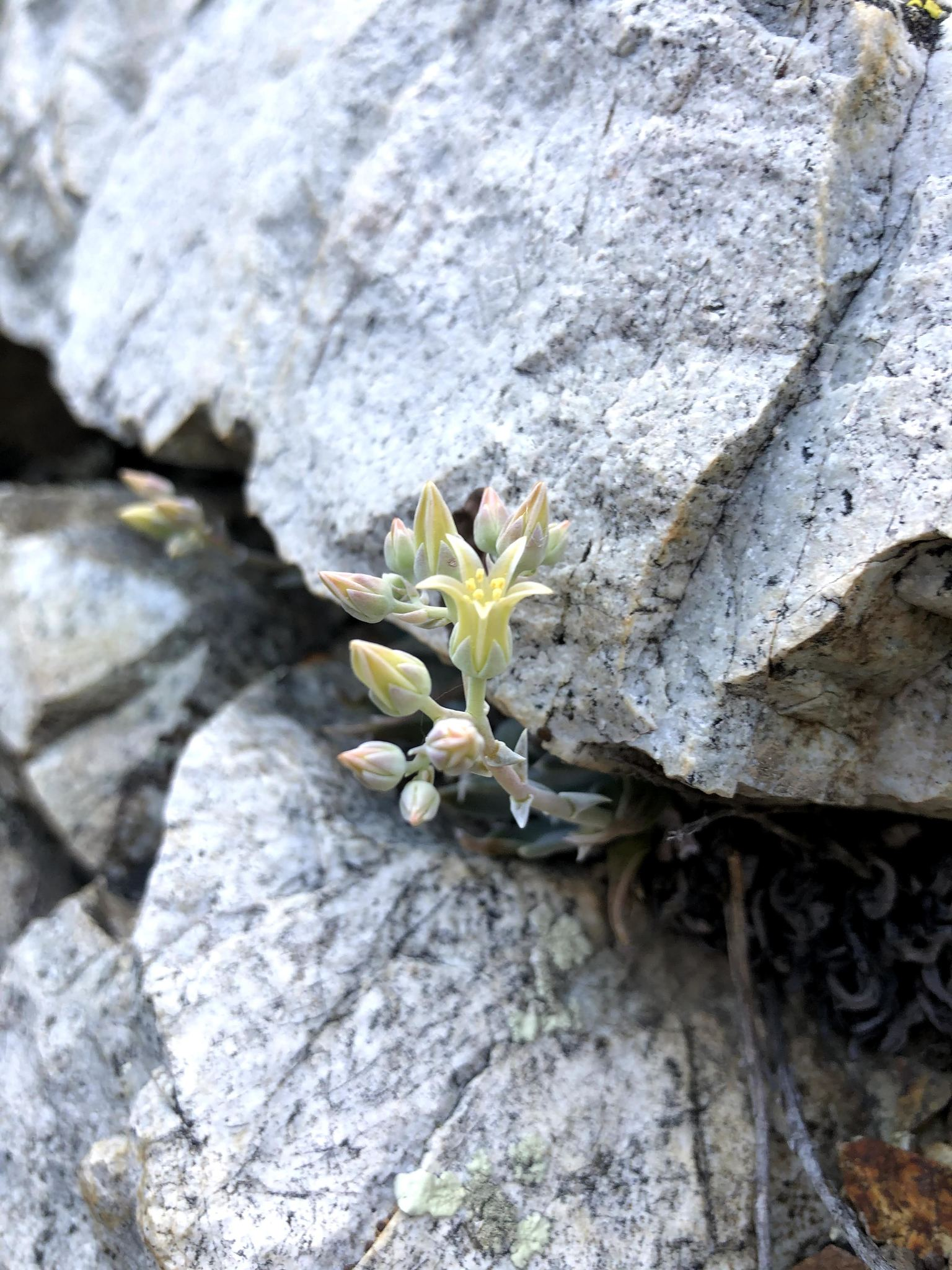
Growing in the crevice of a boulder

The plant grows up to 50 densely packed caudices, upon which are the rosettes. The rosette contains leaves up to about 10 centimeters wide, each leaf blade-shaped to cone-shaped and up to 10 centimeters long and one wide. The leaves are fleshy and waxy, generally pale green, often tinted with pink or yellow. The waxy leaves are typical of Dudleya growing in rocky outcroppings. The plant grows in a habit similar to "cushion plants" of alpine environments.

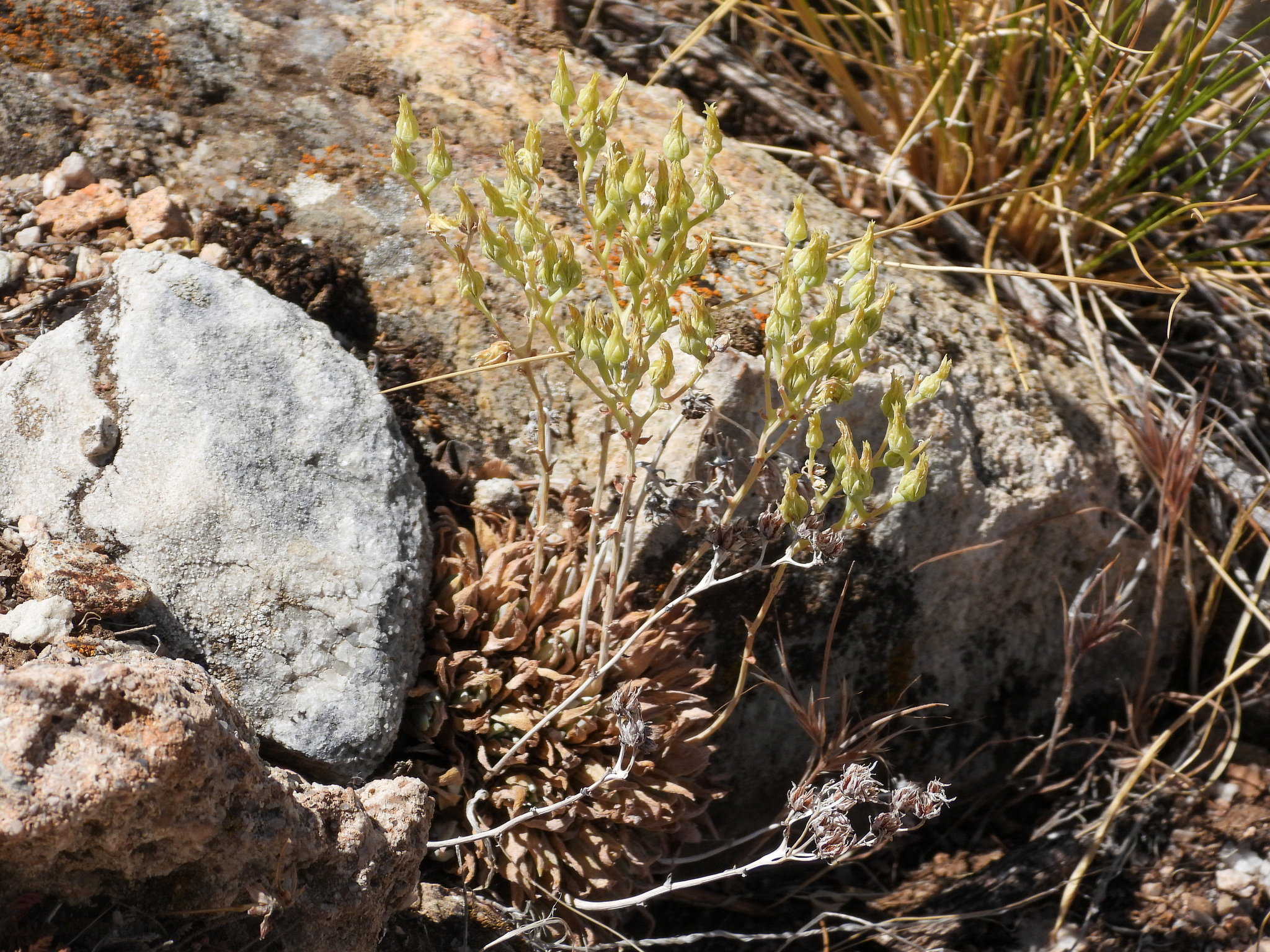
This species is very caespitose, with the rosettes clumping together

From the rosette bolts an erect stem, which is a caudex topped with a multi-branched inflorescence. The stem and branches may be dark to very light and almost white in color. Each branch may be several centimeters long and bear two to eight flowers. The flowers are very pale yellow to reddish-yellow and have sharply pointed petals one to one and a half centimeters long. The keel is tinged a dark yellow to red. The plant flowers from May to June or July.

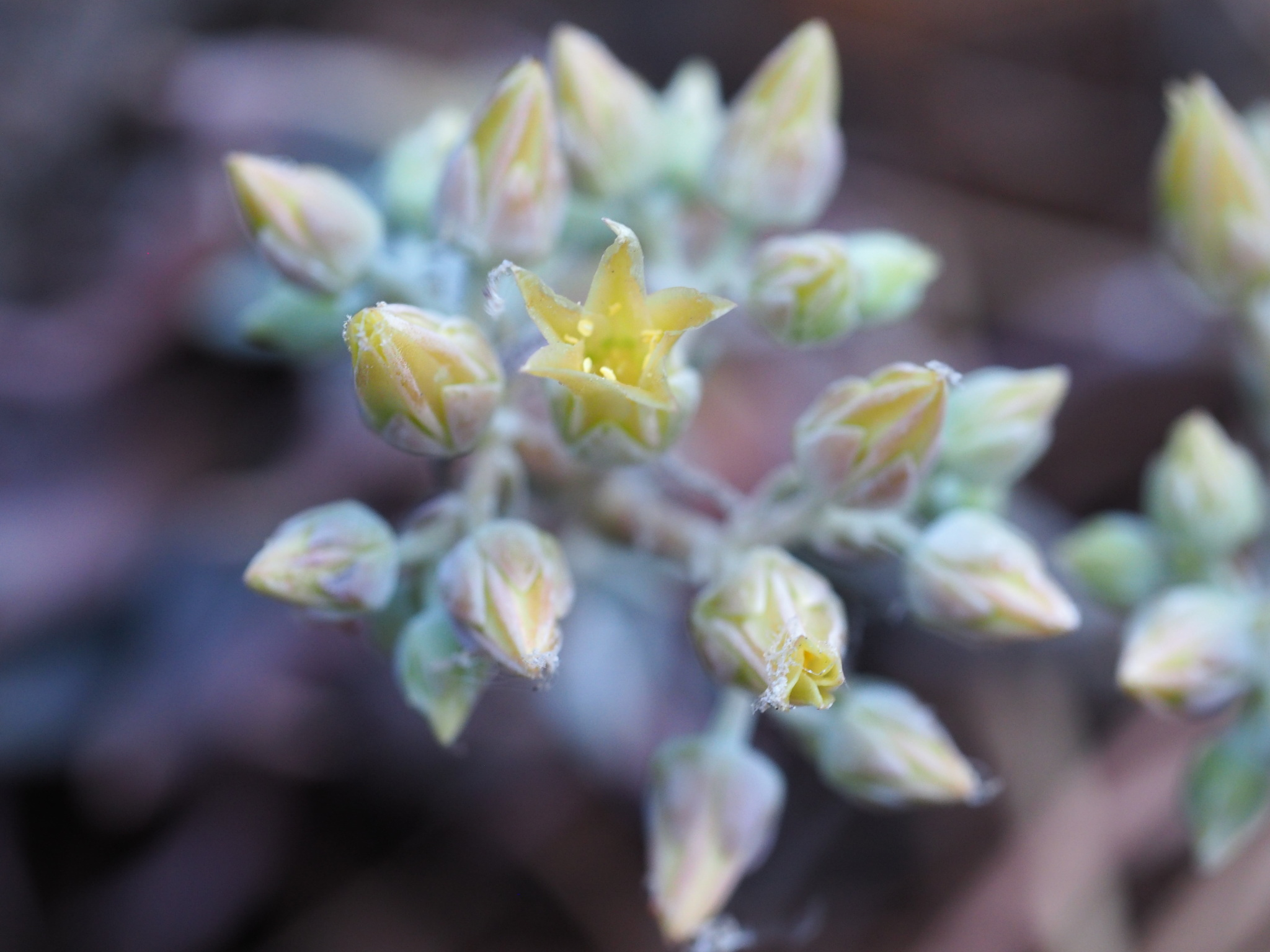
Detail of flowers

== Taxonomy ==
The plant was originally set to be described by Katharine Brandegee, upon collected specimens made by C. A. Purpus, but she failed to do so. Later, Reid Moran, an expert on the genus Dudleya, took note of the narrow leaves from the Purpus collection, but did not recognize it as distinct from Dudleya cymosa.

The plant was formerly placed as a separate species, but recent taxonomic sources now regard it as a subspecies of Dudleya abramsii. It is recognized as being somewhat intermediate between Dudleya abramsii subsp. abramsii and Dudleya cymosa subsp. costatifolia or Dudleya cymosa subsp. cymosa.

== Distribution and habitat ==
Dudleya a. subsp. calcicola occurs predominantly on pre-Cretaceous limestones within chaparral or pinyon-juniper woodland at an elevation of 500 to 2600 meters. It exists throughout the southern Sierra Nevada, from the Rincon area south of Durrwood Creek in Tulare County to the southern Piute Mountains near Caliente Creek in Kern County. However, the area of limestone outcroppings is quite limited.

== Horticulture ==
The plant is not generally considered a good candidate for garden culture because of its requirement for limestone-based soils. Off-road vehicle traffic and cattle grazing have had serious impacts on wild populations.
