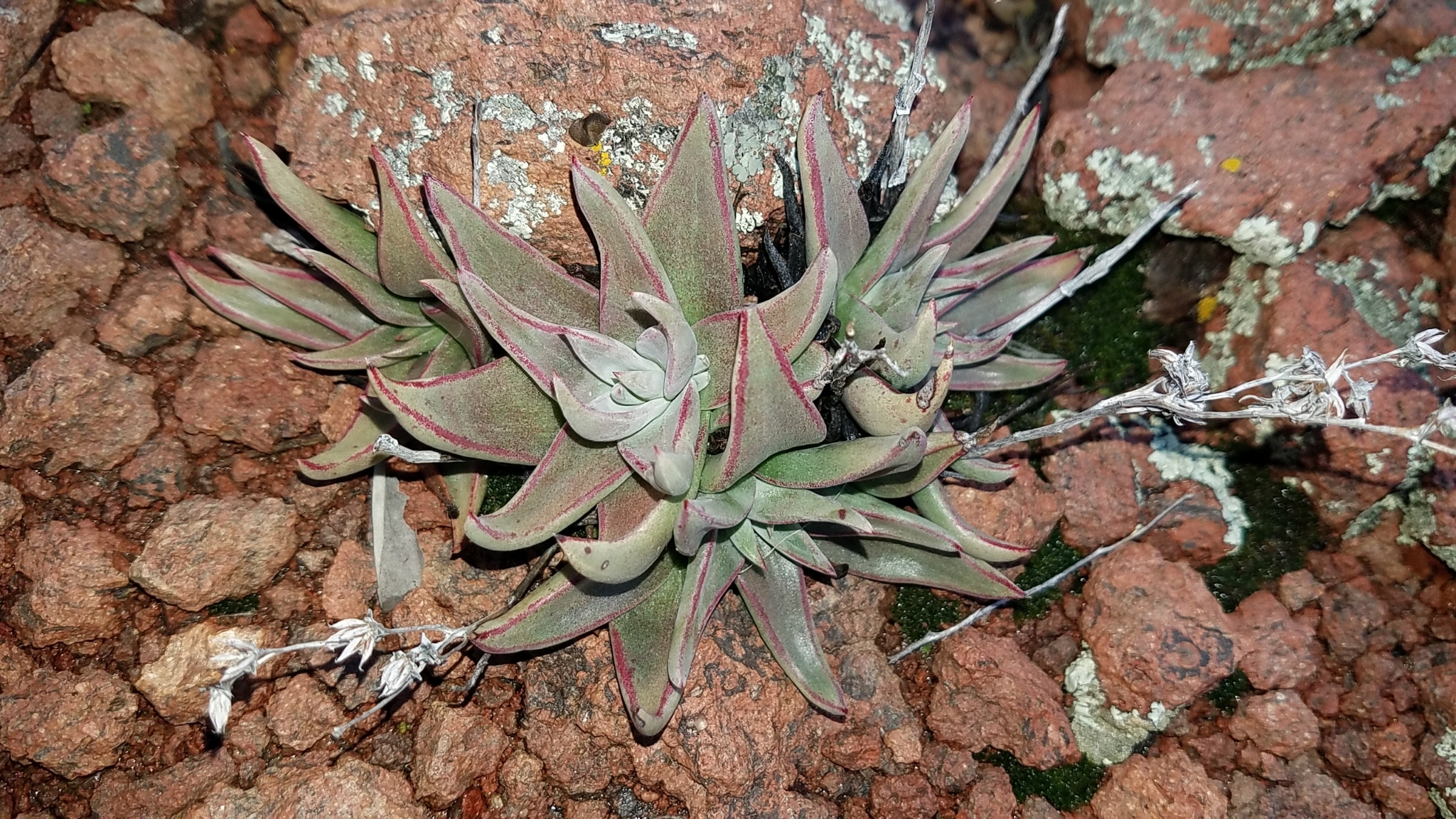
- subsp. abramsii

Conservation status
- Apparently Secure (NatureServe)

Scientific classification
- Kingdom: Plantae
- Clade: Tracheophytes
- Clade: Angiosperms
- Clade: Eudicots
- Order: Saxifragales
- Family: Crassulaceae
- Genus: Dudleya
- Species: D. abramsii

Binomial name
- Dudleya abramsii Rose

= Dudleya abramsii =

Species of succulent

Dudleya abramsii is a species complex of succulent plants native to California and parts of Baja California. There are numerous subspecies, some critically endangered, with varying habits and lifestyles, but most often characterized by a smaller size, yellow flowers, and an affinity for rocky habitats. The subspecies may be polyphyletic.

== Description ==
Dudleya abramsii is a fleshy perennial forming a small basal cluster of leaves around a central caudex. The habit of Dudleya abramsii is growing in either solitary rosettes or in caespitose forms. The thick, glaucous leaves are lance-oblong to lanceolate, reaching up to 11 centimeters in length, but often remaining much smaller, usually 2 to 30 mm long, and 3 to 20 mm wide. The entire rosette is generally only 0.5 to 15 cm wide. The inflorescence is a mostly erect, branching stem lined with pointed bracts and bearing up to 15 flowers. The inflorescence has a peduncle 2 to 25 cm tall, and 1 to 6 mm wide. The lower bracts are 4 to 40 mm large, and the pedicels are anywhere from 0.5 to 7 mm long. The flower has five small, thick sepals at the base of five pale to cream yellow petals each roughly 8 to 13 mm long. The keel of the flower is tinged with fine, purple to red lines.

== Taxonomy ==
There are several subspecies, and many former subspecies with differing recognition. Flora of North America and The Jepson Manual have elevated Dudleya parva to a species, while other subspecies have been moved to Dudleya cymosa

The following subspecies are recognized in the 2012 Jepson eFlora:

- Dudleya abramsii subsp. abramsii Rose (Abrams' liveforever) – native to the Peninsular Ranges of California and Baja California. Syn. Dudleya tenuis.
- Dudleya abramsii subsp. affinis K.M. Nakai (San Bernardino Mountains liveforever) – endemic to the San Bernardino Mountains near the edge of the Mojave Desert. Syn. Dudleya baldwinensis.
- Dudleya abramsii subsp. bettinae (Hoover) Bartel (San Luis Obispo serpentine dudleya or Betty's liveforever) – endemic to the coastal serpentine of San Luis Obispo County, California.
- Dudleya abramsii subsp. calcicola (Bartel & Shevock) K.M. Nakai (Limestone dudleya) – endemic to the southern Sierra Nevada. Syn. Dudleya calcicola
- Dudleya abramsii subsp. murina (Eastw.) Moran (San Luis Obispo or mouse-leaved dudleya) – endemic to coastal San Luis Obispo County
- Dudleya abramsii subsp. setchellii (Jeps.) Moran (Santa Clara Valley liveforever) – endemic to the Santa Clara Valley. Formerly classified under D. cymosa.

== Distribution and habitat ==
D. abramsii is native to California and northern Baja California, where it grows in rocky areas in a number of habitat types.
