= Franz Josef Niedenzu =

German botanist (1857–1937)

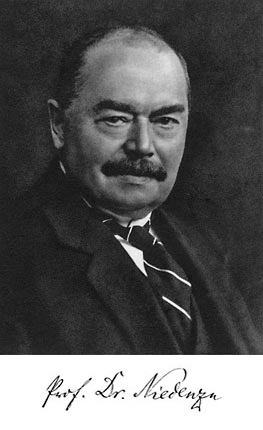
+ foto

Franz Josef Niedenzu (29 November 1857 – 30 September 1937) was a German botanist born in Köppernig. He is remembered for his work with the botanical family Malpighiaceae.

For most of his career he was a professor and subsequently rector at the Lyceum Hosianum in Braunsberg, East Prussia (presently Braniewo, Poland). At Braunsberg, he established a botanical garden.

He was author of the chapter on Malpighiaceae in Adolf Engler's "Das Pflanzenreich", and contributed descriptions of nine plant families in Engler and Prantl's "Die Natürlichen Pflanzenfamilien". He identified numerous new species, as well as six genera; Alcoceratothrix (now Byrsonima), Callyntranthele (now Blepharandra), Cordobia, Diaspis (now Caucanthus), Malpighiodes, and Sprucina (now Jubelina).

In 2006, botanist W.R.Anderson published Niedenzuella, a genus of flowering plants from South America, belonging to the family Malpighiaceae and named in his honour.
