= Mcvaughia =

Scientific classification
- Kingdom: Plantae
- Clade: Tracheophytes
- Clade: Angiosperms
- Clade: Eudicots
- Clade: Rosids
- Order: Malpighiales
- Family: Malpighiaceae
- Genus: Mcvaughia; W.R.Anderson
- Species: M. bahiana

Binomial name
- Mcvaughia bahiana W.R.Anderson

Genus of flowering plants

Mcvaughia is a genus in the Malpighiaceae, a family of about 75 genera of flowering plants in the order Malpighiales. Mcvaughia contains only one species, Mcvaughia bahiana, a shrub occurring in open shrubby vegetation (caatinga) on sandy soils of lowland Bahia, Brazil. It is related to Burdachia and Glandonia.

The genus was named in honor of the American taxonomist Rogers McVaugh (1909–2009).
