= Fimbriaria =

Fimbriaria may refer to:

- Fimbriaria (flatworm), a genus of flatworms in the family Hymenolepididae
- Fimbriaria, a genus of red algae in the family Rhodomelaceae, synonym of Odonthalia
- Fimbriaria, a genus of flowering plants in the family Malpighiaceae, synonym of Schwannia
