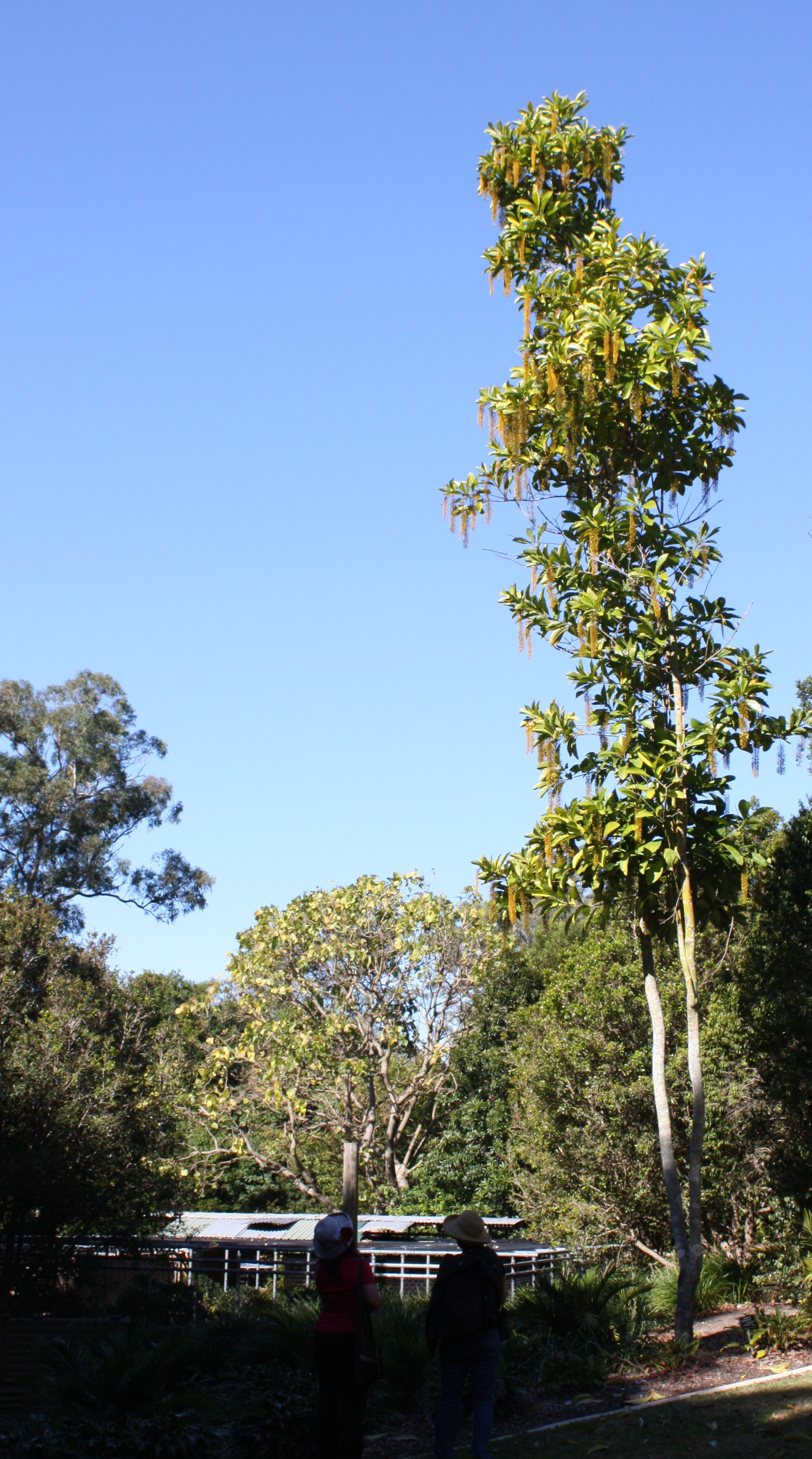
- Lophanthera lactescens

Scientific classification
- Kingdom: Plantae
- Clade: Tracheophytes
- Clade: Angiosperms
- Clade: Eudicots
- Clade: Rosids
- Order: Malpighiales
- Family: Malpighiaceae
- Genus: Lophanthera; A.Juss.

Species
- Lophanthera hammelii W.R.Anderson; Lophanthera lactescens Ducke; Lophanthera longifolia (H.B.K.) Griseb.; Lophanthera pendula Ducke; Lophanthera spruceana Nied.

= Lophanthera =

Genus of flowering plants

Lophanthera is a genus in the Malpighiaceae, a family of about 75 genera of flowering plants in the order Malpighiales. Lophanthera comprises 5 species of shrubs and trees, all but one native to the Amazonian South America; the exception (L. hammelii) is from Costa Rica. Lophanthera lactescens has become popular in recent decades as a cultivated ornamental in many warm regions of the Old and New World. It is propagated by cuttings and seeds.
