= Cottsia =

Scientific classification
- Kingdom: Plantae
- Clade: Tracheophytes
- Clade: Angiosperms
- Clade: Eudicots
- Clade: Rosids
- Order: Malpighiales
- Family: Malpighiaceae
- Genus: Cottsia; Dubard & Dop

Species
- Cottsia california (Benth.) W. R. Anderson & C. Davis; Cottsia gracilis (A. Gray) W. R. Anderson & C. Davis; Cottsia linearis (Wiggins) W. R. Anderson & C. Davis

Genus of flowering plants

Cottsia is a genus in the Malpighiaceae, a family of about 75 genera of flowering plants in the order Malpighiales. Cottsia comprises 3 species of slender twining vines native to northern Mexico and extending into Texas, New Mexico, and Arizona. The species of Cottsia were formerly included in Janusia, a genus of South America.

== External link and reference ==
- Malpighiaceae Malpighiaceae - description, taxonomy, phylogeny, and nomenclature
- Cottsia
- Anderson, W. R., and C. Davis, 2007. Generic adjustments in Neotropical Malpighiaceae. Contributions from the University of Michigan Herbarium 25: 137–166.
