= Flabellariopsis =

Scientific classification
- Kingdom: Plantae
- Clade: Tracheophytes
- Clade: Angiosperms
- Clade: Eudicots
- Clade: Rosids
- Order: Malpighiales
- Family: Malpighiaceae
- Genus: Flabellariopsis; R.Wilczek
- Species: F. acuminata

Binomial name
- Flabellariopsis acuminata (Engl.) R.Wilczek

Synonyms
- Brachylophon acuminatum (Engl.) Engl.; Brachylophon niedenzuianum var. acuminatum (Engl.) Nied.; Triaspis acuminata Engl.; Brachylophon acuminatum var. niedenzuianum (Engl. ex Nied.) Brenan; Brachylophon niedenzuianum Engl. ex Nied.; Brachylophon niedenzuianum var. typicum Nied.

Genus of flowering plants

Flabellariopsis is a genus in the Malpighiaceae, a family of about 75 genera of flowering plants in the order Malpighiales. Flabellariopsis includes one species, Flabellariopsis acuminata, which occurs in equatorial Africa in riverine forests or in wet forests, dry evergreen forests, or wooded grasslands.
