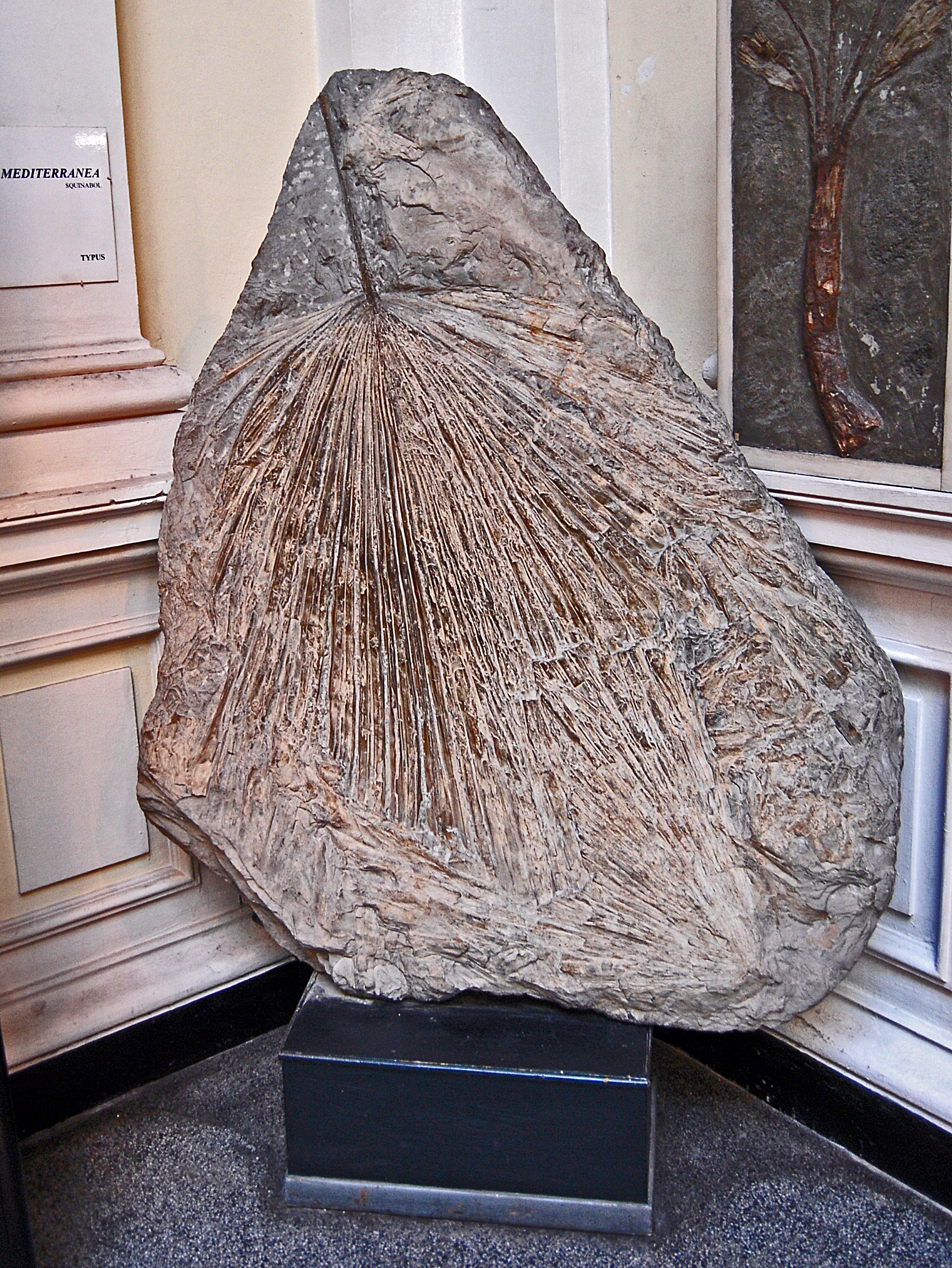
- Fossil of Flabellaria mediterranea on display at the Museo Civico di Storia Naturale di Genova

Scientific classification
- Kingdom: Plantae
- Clade: Tracheophytes
- Clade: Angiosperms
- Clade: Eudicots
- Clade: Rosids
- Order: Malpighiales
- Family: Malpighiaceae
- Genus: Flabellaria; Cav.
- Species: F. paniculata

Binomial name
- Flabellaria paniculata Cav.

= Flabellaria =

Genus of flowering plants

Flabellaria is a genus in the Malpighiaceae, a family of about 75 genera of flowering plants in the order Malpighiales. Flabellaria includes one variable species, Flabellaria paniculata.

== Etymology ==
The genus name Flabellaria comes from the Latin word flabellum meaning small fan, referring to the shape of the samara. This name was given by Cavanilles in 1790.

== Synonyms ==
- Triaspis flabellaria A.Juss.
- Triopterys pinnata Poir.

== Fossil record ==
The name Flabellaria was also given by Sternberg in 1821 to unrelated fossil palm leaves. That genus with the same name is known in the fossil record from the Cretaceous to the Eocene (age range: from 70.6 to 33.9 million years ago.).

== Description ==
Flabellaria paniculata, the only living species in this genus, can reach a length of 3–15 metres (9.8–49.2 ft). These plants are woody vine, with paniculate, lateral and terminal inflorescences up to 20 cm. long. Flowers are radially symmetrical, about 1 centimeter in diameter, with white and spatulate petals.

== Distribution and habitat ==
Flabellaria paniculata is widely distributed in equatorial Africa in thickets, woodlands, and forests, especially along rivers, at elevations of 1,150–1,650 metres (3,770–5,410 ft).

== Bibliography ==
- Abo, K.A., Olugbuyiro, J.A.O. (2004) Phytochemical and antibacterial studies of extracts of Flabellaria paniculata. African Journal of Biomedical Research 7(1):35-36.
- Abo, K.A., Olugbuyiro, J.A.O., Famakinde, S.A. (2004) Anti-infective and wound healing properties of Flabellaria paniculata 1. African journal of Biomedical Research 7 (2): 85–87.
- Olugbuyiro, J.A.O., Abo, K.A., Leigh, O.O. (2010) Wound healing effect Of Flabellaria paniculata leaf extracts Journal of Ethnopharmacology 127: 786–788.
- ORSTOM 1988. List Vasc. Pl. Gabon
