= Coleostachys =

Scientific classification
- Kingdom: Plantae
- Clade: Tracheophytes
- Clade: Angiosperms
- Clade: Eudicots
- Clade: Rosids
- Order: Malpighiales
- Family: Malpighiaceae
- Genus: Coleostachys; A.Juss.
- Species: C. genipifolia

Binomial name
- Coleostachys genipifolia A.Juss.

Genus of flowering plants

Coleostachys is a genus in the Malpighiaceae, a family of about 75 genera of flowering plants in the order Malpighiales. Coleostachys contains only one species (Coleostachys genipifolia) of shrubs or treelets found in wet forests of the Amazonian lowlands of French Guiana and adjacent Brazil.
