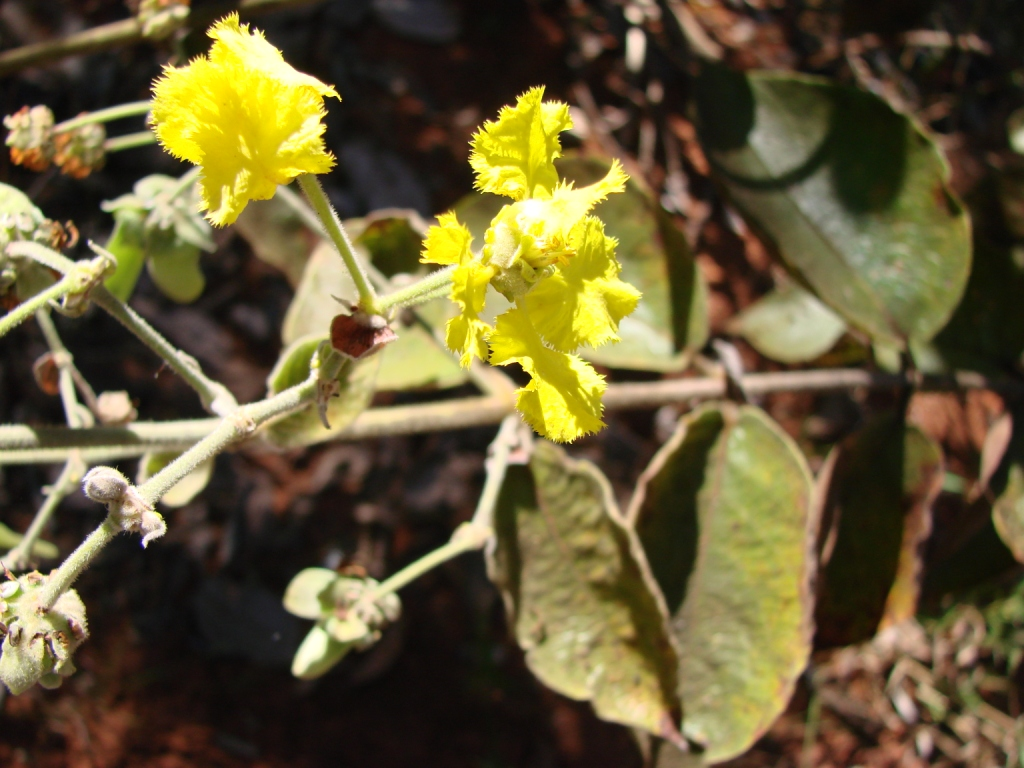

Scientific classification
- Kingdom: Plantae
- Clade: Tracheophytes
- Clade: Angiosperms
- Clade: Eudicots
- Clade: Rosids
- Order: Malpighiales
- Family: Malpighiaceae
- Genus: Peixotoa; A.Juss.

Species
- 29 species

= Peixotoa =

Genus of flowering plants

Peixotoa is a genus in the Malpighiaceae, a family of about 75 genera of flowering plants in the order Malpighiales. Peixotoa comprises 29 species of vines, shrubs, and subshrubs native to Brazil and adjacent Paraguay and Bolivia.

== External links and references ==
- Peixotoa from the University of Michigan Herbarium
- Malpighiaceae Malpighiaceae - description, taxonomy, phylogeny, and nomenclature
- Anderson, C. 1982. A monograph of the genus Peixotoa (Malpighiaceae). Contributions from the University of Michigan Herbarium 15: 1–92.
- Anderson, C. 2001. Peixotoa floribunda (Malpighiaceae), a new species from Paraguay. Contributions from the University of Michigan Herbarium 23: 49–52.
