= Rhynchophora =

Scientific classification
- Kingdom: Plantae
- Clade: Tracheophytes
- Clade: Angiosperms
- Clade: Eudicots
- Clade: Rosids
- Order: Malpighiales
- Family: Malpighiaceae
- Genus: Rhynchophora; Arènes

Species
- Rhynchophora humbertii Arènes; Rhynchophora phillipsonii W.R.Anderson

Synonyms
- Calyptostylis Arènes

Genus of flowering plants

Rhynchophora is a genus in the Malpighiaceae, a family of about 73 genera of flowering plants in the order Malpighiales. Rhynchophora comprises two species of slender woody vines native to Madagascar. The distinctive three to four-winged fruit resembles a helicopter and is unique in the family.
