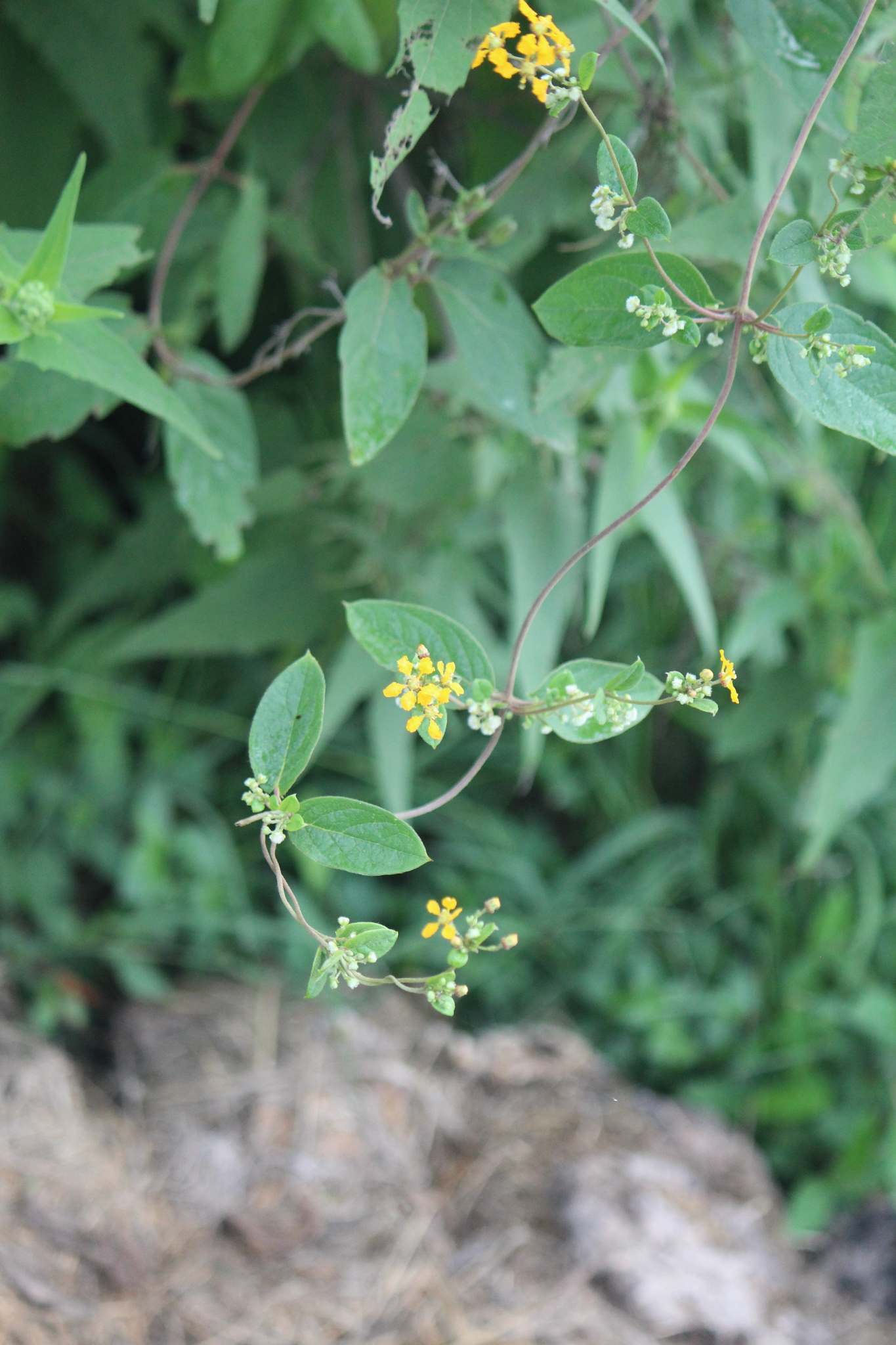
- Aspicarpa cynanchoides

Scientific classification
- Kingdom: Plantae
- Clade: Tracheophytes
- Clade: Angiosperms
- Clade: Eudicots
- Clade: Rosids
- Order: Malpighiales
- Family: Malpighiaceae
- Genus: Aspicarpa; Rich.

Synonyms
- Acosmus Desv.; Aspicarpon Bosc, orth. var.; Gaudichaudia Kunth; Rosanthus Small; Tritomopterys Nied.

= Aspicarpa =

Genus of flowering plants

Aspicarpa is a genus of flowering plants belonging to the family Malpighiaceae. It includes 25 species native to the subtropical and tropical Americas, ranging from the southwestern United States (Arizona, New Mexico, and Texas) through Mexico and Central America to Colombia and Venezuela.

== Species ==
25 species are accepted.

- Aspicarpa albida (Cham. & Schltdl.) Hassl.
- Aspicarpa andersonii (S.L.Jessup) R.F.Almeida & M.Pell.
- Aspicarpa arnottiana (A.Juss.) R.F.Almeida & M.Pell.
- Aspicarpa brevipes (Sessé ex DC.) W.R.Anderson
- Aspicarpa chasei (W.R.Anderson) R.F.Almeida & M.Pell.
- Aspicarpa congestiflora (A.Juss.) Hassl.
- Aspicarpa cycloptera (Moc. & Sessé ex DC.) R.F.Almeida & M.Pell.
- Aspicarpa cynanchoides (Kunth) Hassl.
- Aspicarpa diandra (Nied.) Hassl.
- Aspicarpa galeottiana (Nied.) Hassl.
- Aspicarpa hexandra (Nied.) Hassl.
- Aspicarpa hirtella Rich.
- Aspicarpa hyssopifolia A.Gray
- Aspicarpa implexa (S.L.Jessup) R.F.Almeida & M.Pell.
- Aspicarpa intermixteca (S.L.Jessup) R.F.Almeida & M.Pell.
- Aspicarpa karwinskiana (A.Juss.) Hassk.
- Aspicarpa krusei (W.R.Anderson) R.F.Almeida & M.Pell.
- Aspicarpa mcvaughii (W.R.Anderson) R.F.Almeida & M.Pell.
- Aspicarpa mollis (Benth.) Hassk.
- Aspicarpa palmeri (S.Watson) R.F.Almeida & M.Pell.
- Aspicarpa steinmannii W.R.Anderson
- Aspicarpa subverticillata (Rose) Hassl.
- Aspicarpa symplecta (S.L.Jessup) R.F.Almeida & M.Pell.
- Aspicarpa synoptera (S.L.Jessup) R.F.Almeida & M.Pell.
- Aspicarpa zygoptera (S.L.Jessup) R.F.Almeida & M.Pell.
