= Excentradenia =

Scientific classification
- Kingdom: Plantae
- Clade: Tracheophytes
- Clade: Angiosperms
- Clade: Eudicots
- Clade: Rosids
- Order: Malpighiales
- Family: Malpighiaceae
- Genus: Excentradenia; W.R.Anderson

Species
- Excentradenia adenophora; Excentradenia boliviana; Excentradenia primaeva; Excentradenia propinqua

Genus of flowering plants

Excentradenia is a genus of plants in the family Malpighiaceae. Excentradenia comprises four species of woody vines native to the forests of northern South America.

== External links and reference ==
- Malpighiaceae Malpighiaceae - description, taxonomy, phylogeny, and nomenclature
- Excentradenia
- Anderson, W. R. 1997. Excentradenia, a new genus of Malpighiaceae from South America. Contr. Univ. Michigan Herb. 21: 29–36.
