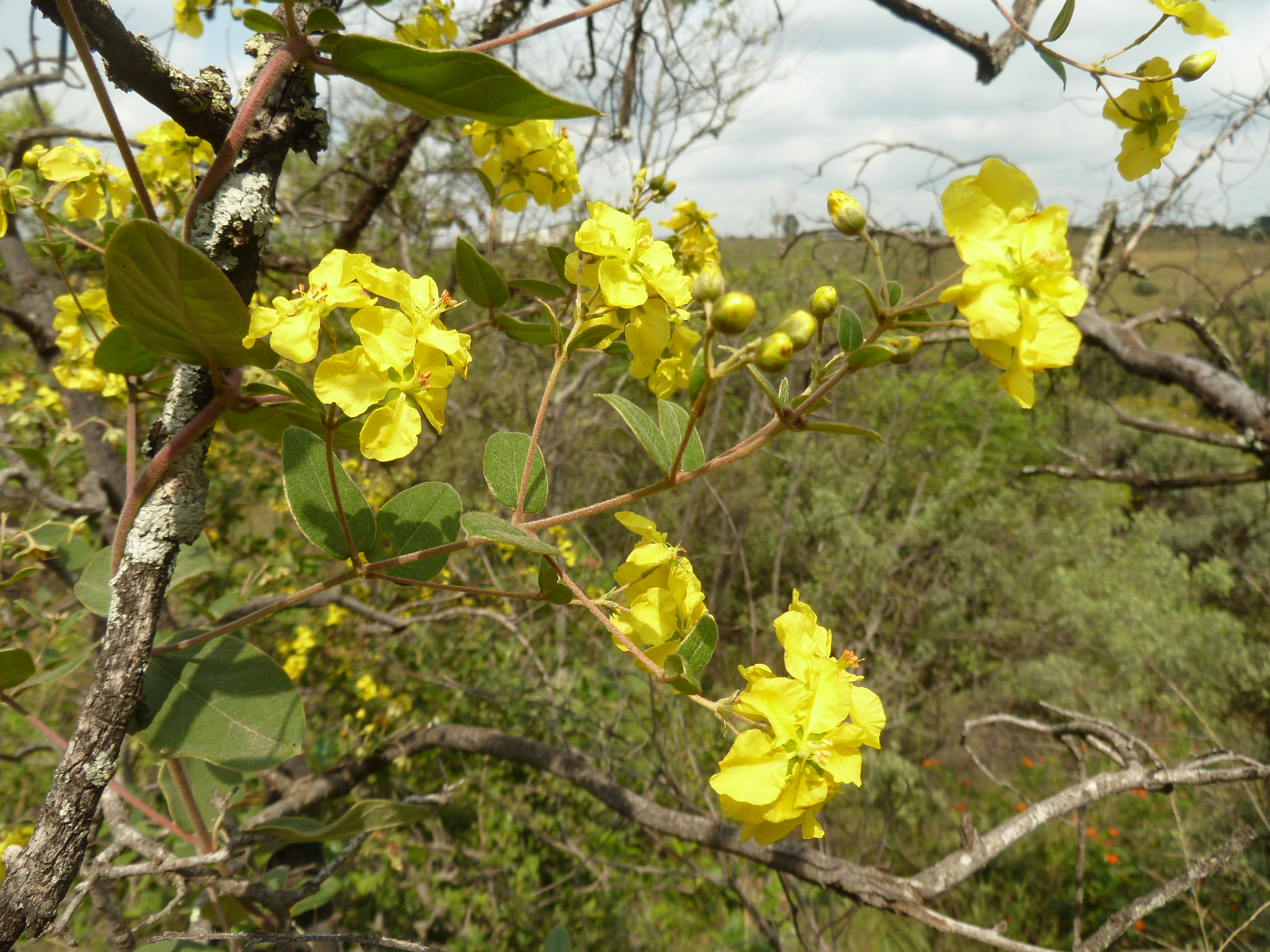

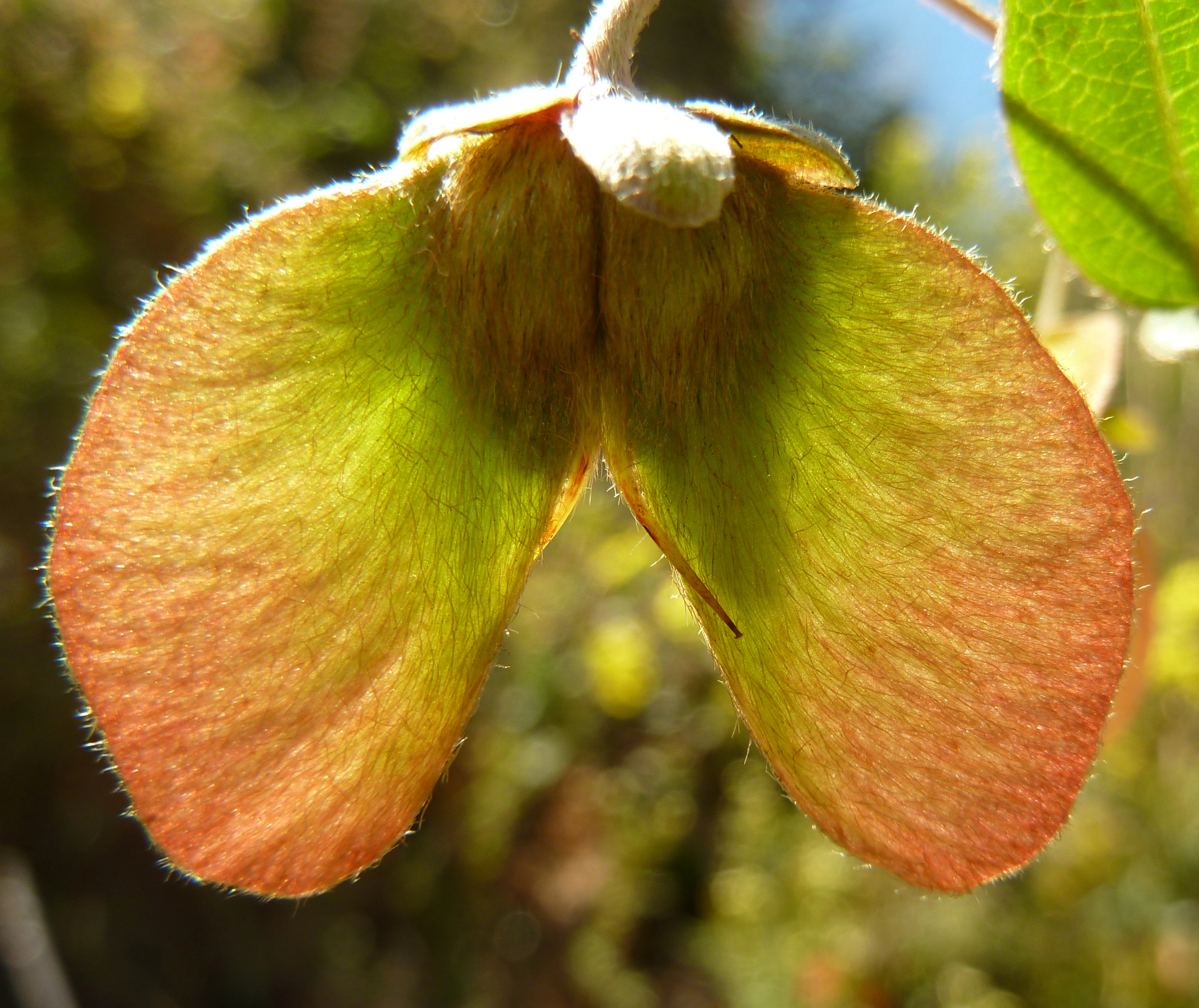
- Flowers and samara of Sphedamnocarpus pruriens

Scientific classification
- Kingdom: Plantae
- Clade: Tracheophytes
- Clade: Angiosperms
- Clade: Eudicots
- Clade: Rosids
- Order: Malpighiales
- Family: Malpighiaceae
- Genus: Sphedamnocarpus; Planch. ex Benth. & Hook.f.

Species
- See text

= Sphedamnocarpus =

Genus of flowering plants

Sphedamnocarpus is a plant genus in the Malpighiaceae, consisting of some 10 to 18 species. They are native to Sub-Saharan Africa and Madagascar, and may be subshrubs, shrubs or climbers. Their mostly yellow flowers have 5 sepals and 5 petals. The 3 to 4-locular ovaries develop into samaras.

== Species ==
The species include:

- Sphedamnocarpus angolensis (A.Juss.) Planch. ex Oliv.
- Sphedamnocarpus barbosae Launert
- Sphedamnocarpus cuspidifolius Arènes
- Sphedamnocarpus decaryi Arènes
- Sphedamnocarpus dubardii R. Vig. & Humbert ex Arènes
- Sphedamnocarpus humbertii Arènes
- Sphedamnocarpus multiflorus Nied.
- Sphedamnocarpus orbicularis Arènes
- Sphedamnocarpus pruriens (A. Juss.) Szyszył.
- Sphedamnocarpus transvalicus Burtt Davy
