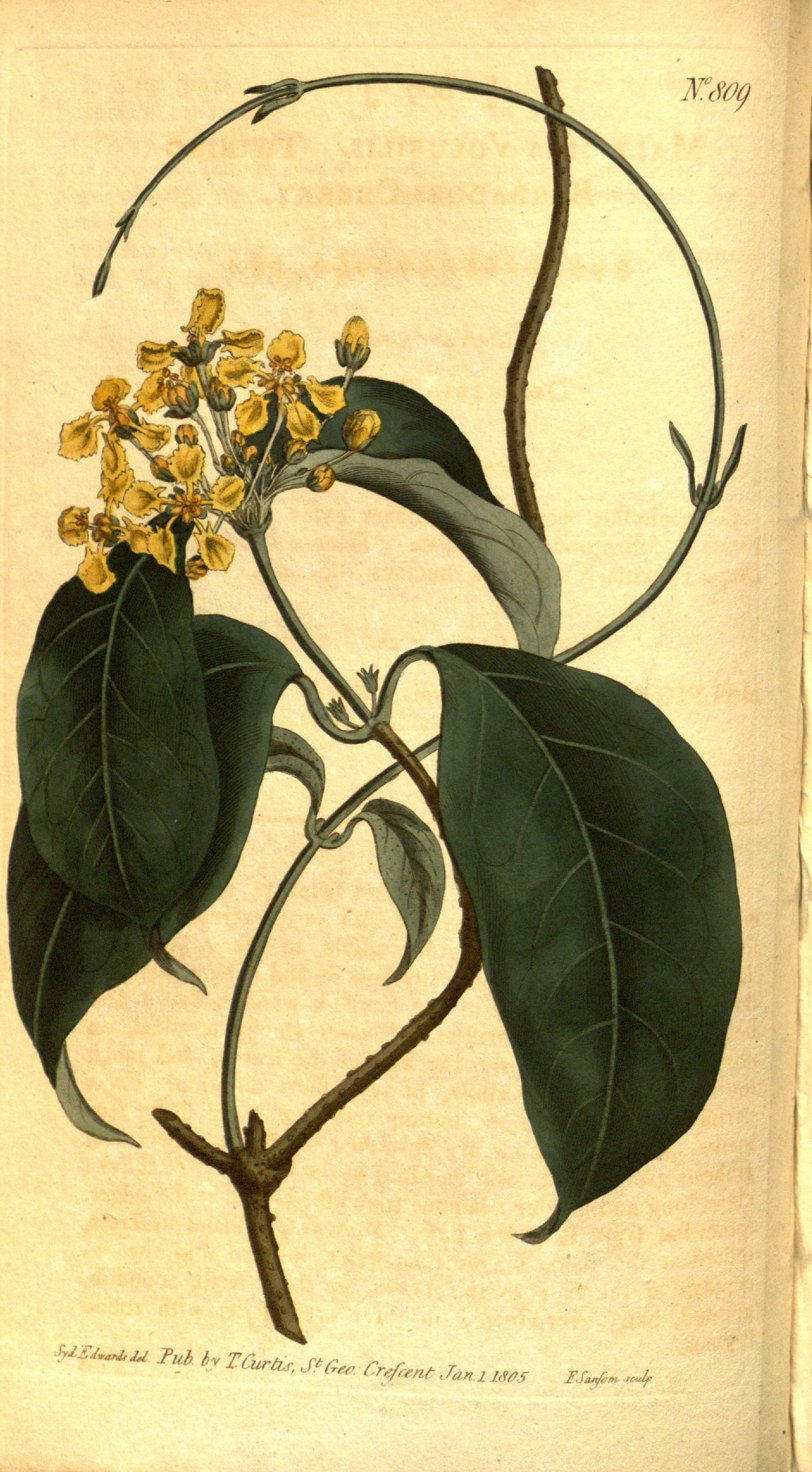
- An illustration of Carolus sinemariensis from Curtis's Botanical Magazine

Scientific classification
- Kingdom: Plantae
- Clade: Tracheophytes
- Clade: Angiosperms
- Clade: Eudicots
- Clade: Rosids
- Order: Malpighiales
- Family: Malpighiaceae
- Genus: Carolus; W.R.Anderson

Species
- Carolus anderssonii (W. R. Anderson) W. R. Anderson; Carolus chasei (W. R. Anderson) W. R. Anderson; Carolus chlorocarpus (Adr. Juss.) W. R. Anderson; Carolus dukei (Cuatrec. & Croat) W. R. Anderson; Carolus renidens (Adr. Juss.) W. R. Anderson; Carolus sinemariensis (Aubl.) W. R. Anderson

= Carolus (plant) =

Genus of flowering plants

Carolus is a genus in the Malpighiaceae, a family of about 75 genera of flowering plants in the order Malpighiales. Carolus comprises six species of woody vines native to Mexico, Central America, the Lesser Antilles, and South America.

== External links and references ==
- Malpighiaceae Malpighiaceae - description, taxonomy, phylogeny, and nomenclature
- Carolus
- Anderson, W. R. 2006. Eight segregates from the neotropical genus Mascagnia (Malpighiaceae). Novon 16: 168–204.
