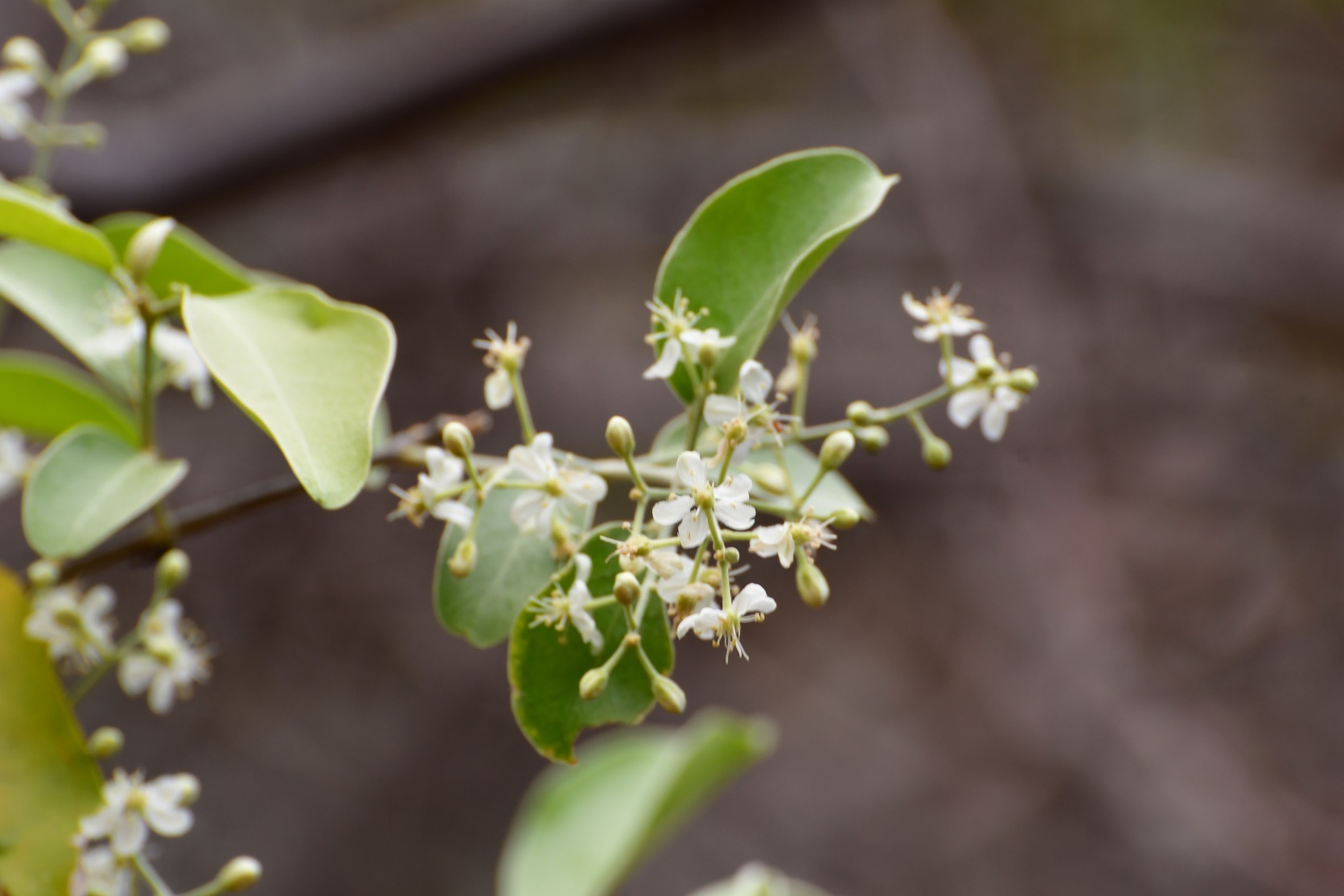
- Psychopterys multiflora

Scientific classification
- Kingdom: Plantae
- Clade: Tracheophytes
- Clade: Angiosperms
- Clade: Eudicots
- Clade: Rosids
- Order: Malpighiales
- Family: Malpighiaceae
- Genus: Psychopterys; W.R.Anderson & S.Corso

Species
- Psychopterys dipholiphylla; Psychopterys mcvaughii; Psychopterys multiflora; Psychopterys ornata; Psychopterys pardalota; Psychopterys polycarpa; Psychopterys psilocarpa; Psychopterys rivularis

= Psychopterys =

Genus of flowering plants

Psychopterys is a genus in the Malpighiaceae, a family of about 75 genera of flowering plants in the order Malpighiales. Psychopterys comprises 8 species of woody vines, occasionally described as shrubs or small trees, which occur in matorral, tropical deciduous forest, and wet forest in southern Mexico, Guatemala, and Belize. This genus is very distinctive because of its nearly radial white corollas and eglandular sepals, which are highly unusual characteristics in the Malpighiaceae of the New World.

== External links and reference ==
- Malpighiaceae Malpighiaceae - description, taxonomy, phylogeny, and nomenclature
- Psychopterys
- Anderson, W. R., and S. Corso. 2007. Psychopterys, a new genus of Malpighiaceae from Mexico and Central America. Contr. Univ. Michigan Herb. 25: 113–135.
