= Microsteira =

Scientific classification
- Kingdom: Plantae
- Clade: Tracheophytes
- Clade: Angiosperms
- Clade: Eudicots
- Clade: Rosids
- Order: Malpighiales
- Family: Malpighiaceae
- Genus: Microsteira; Baker

Genus of plants

Microsteira is a genus of flowering plants belonging to the family Malpighiaceae.

Its native range is Madagascar.

Species:

- Microsteira ambongensis Arènes
- Microsteira ambovombensis Arènes
- Microsteira ampihamensis Arènes
- Microsteira axillaris (Baker) Nied.
- Microsteira besomatensis Arènes
- Microsteira brickavillensis Arènes
- Microsteira chorigyna (Baill.) Dubard & Dop
- Microsteira curtisii Baker
- Microsteira decaryi Arènes
- Microsteira diotostigma (Baill.) Dubard & Dop
- Microsteira eriophylla Arènes
- Microsteira firingalavae Arènes
- Microsteira floribunda (O.Hoffm.) Nied.
- Microsteira glabrifolia Arènes
- Microsteira glaucifolia Arènes
- Microsteira gracilis Dubard & Dop
- Microsteira grandiflora Arènes
- Microsteira humbertii Arènes
- Microsteira ivohibensis Arènes
- Microsteira macrophylla Arènes
- Microsteira microcarpa Arènes
- Microsteira paniculata Arènes
- Microsteira perrieri Arènes
- Microsteira pluriseta (Baill.) Nied.
- Microsteira radamae Arènes
- Microsteira sclerophylla Arènes
- Microsteira tulearensis Arènes
