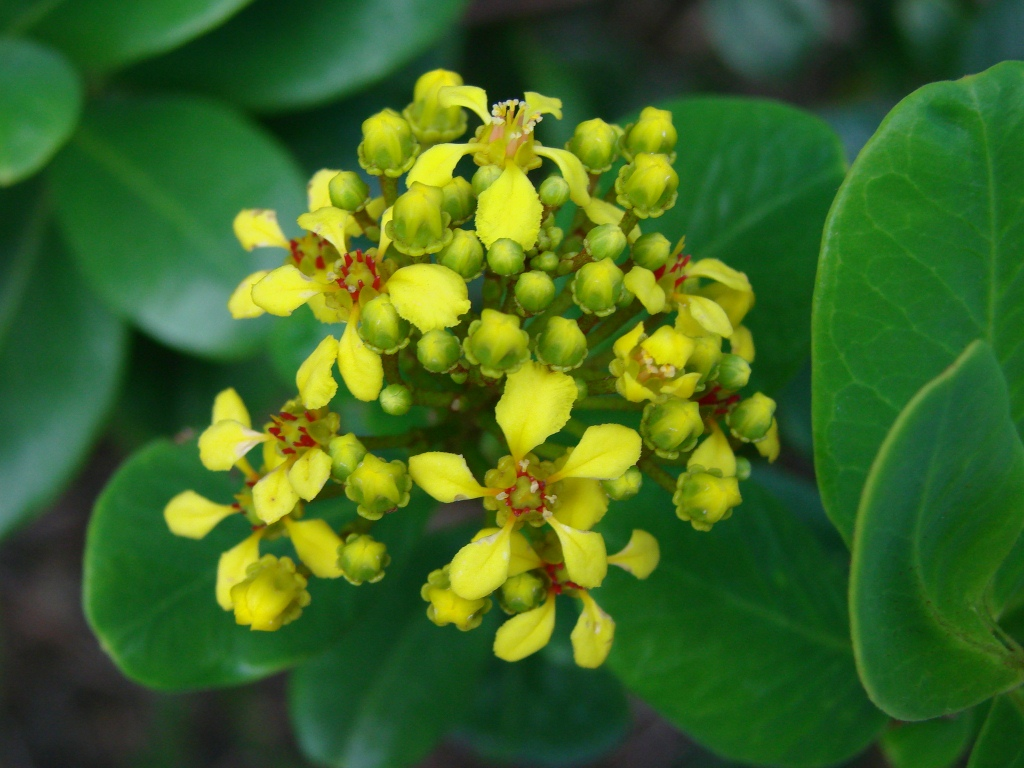
- Verrucularia glaucophylla A. Juss.

Scientific classification
- Kingdom: Plantae
- Clade: Tracheophytes
- Clade: Angiosperms
- Clade: Eudicots
- Clade: Rosids
- Order: Malpighiales
- Family: Malpighiaceae
- Genus: Verrucularina; Rauschert

Synonyms
- Verrucularia A.Juss. (1840), nom. illeg.

= Verrucularina =

Genus of flowering plants

Verrucularina is a genus of flowering plants belonging to the family Malpighiaceae.

Its native range is Brazil.

Species:

- Verrucularina glaucophylla (A.Juss.) Rauschert
- Verrucularina piresii (W.R.Anderson) Rauschert
