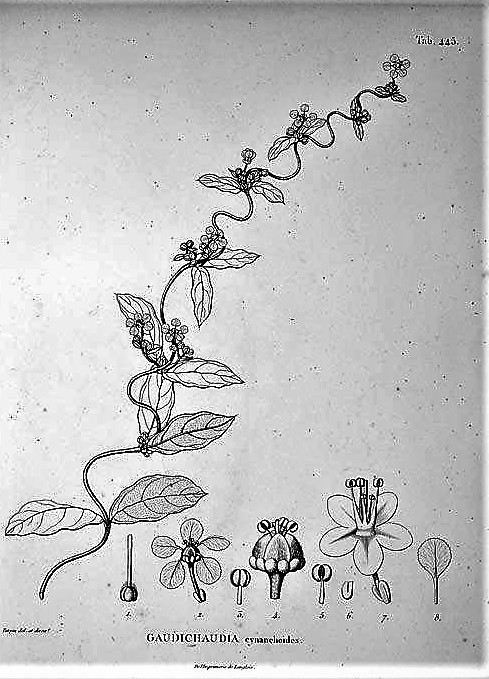
- Pierre Jean François Turpin's (1775–1840) illustration of Gaudichaudia cynanchoides

Scientific classification
- Kingdom: Plantae
- Clade: Embryophytes
- Clade: Tracheophytes
- Clade: Angiosperms
- Clade: Eudicots
- Clade: Rosids
- Order: Malpighiales
- Family: Malpighiaceae
- Genus: Gaudichaudia; Kunth

Synonyms
- Rosanthus Small; Tritomopterys Nied.

= Gaudichaudia (plant) =

Genus of flowering plants

Gaudichaudia is a genus of flowering plants belonging to the family Malpighiaceae.

The type species is Gaudichaudia cynanchoides Kunth.

It is found as a native in the countries of Colombia, Costa Rica, El Salvador, Guatemala, Honduras, Mexico, Nicaragua and Venezuela.

The genus name of Gaudichaudia is in honour of Charles Gaudichaud-Beaupré (1789–1854), a French botanist. It was first described and published in (F.W.H.von Humboldt, A.J.A.Bonpland & C.S.Kunth edited), Nov. Gen. Sp. Vol.5 on page 156 in 1822.

== Description ==
Mostly scandent (vine-like) or trailing shrubs, with opposite leaves which are entire (have a smooth edge) and are petiolate (have a leaf stalk). The calyx (sepals of a flower) has 8 or 10 glands. The petals are yellow and dentate (edges are teethed) and the fruit (or seed capsule) has 3 samaras (A dry, indehiscent fruit with its wall expanded into a wing).

== Known species ==
According to Kew;

- Gaudichaudia albida Schltdl. & Cham.
- Gaudichaudia andersonii S.L.Jessup
- Gaudichaudia chasei W.R.Anderson
- Gaudichaudia congestiflora A.Juss.
- Gaudichaudia cycloptera (Moc. & Sessé ex DC.) W.R.Anderson
- Gaudichaudia cynanchoides Kunth
- Gaudichaudia diandra (Nied.) Chodat
- Gaudichaudia galeottiana (Nied.) Chodat
- Gaudichaudia hexandra (Nied.) Chodat
- Gaudichaudia implexa S.L.Jessup
- Gaudichaudia intermixteca S.L.Jessup
- Gaudichaudia karwinskiana A.Juss.
- Gaudichaudia krusei W.R.Anderson
- Gaudichaudia mcvaughii W.R.Anderson
- Gaudichaudia mollis Benth.
- Gaudichaudia palmeri S.Watson
- Gaudichaudia subverticillata Rose
- Gaudichaudia symplecta S.L.Jessup
- Gaudichaudia synoptera S.L.Jessup
- Gaudichaudia zygoptera S.L.Jessup
