= Brachylophon =

Scientific classification
- Kingdom: Plantae
- Clade: Tracheophytes
- Clade: Angiosperms
- Clade: Eudicots
- Clade: Rosids
- Order: Malpighiales
- Family: Malpighiaceae
- Genus: Brachylophon; Oliv.

Genus of flowering plants

Brachylophon is a genus of flowering plants belonging to the family Malpighiaceae.

Its native range is Tropical Asia.

Species:

- Brachylophon anastomosans Craib
- Brachylophon curtisii Oliv.
