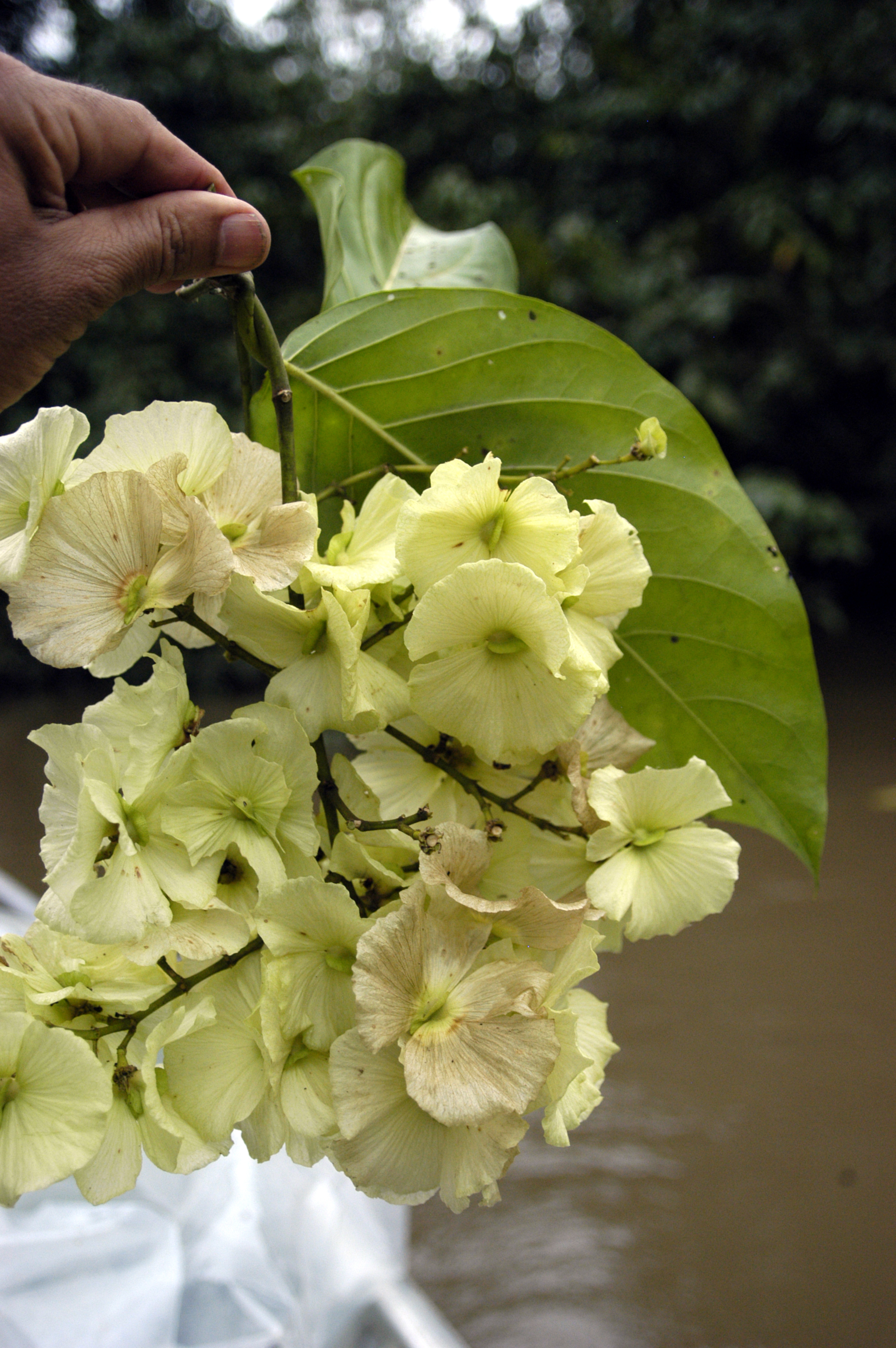
- Adelphia macrophylla

Scientific classification
- Kingdom: Plantae
- Clade: Tracheophytes
- Clade: Angiosperms
- Clade: Eudicots
- Clade: Rosids
- Order: Malpighiales
- Family: Malpighiaceae
- Genus: Adelphia; W. R. Anderson

Species
- Adelphia hiraea (Gaertn.) W. R. Anderson; Adelphia macrophylla (Rusby) W. R. Anderson; Adelphia mirabilis (W. R. Anderson) W. R. Anderson; Adelphia platyrachis (Tr. & Pl.) W. R. Anderson

= Adelphia (plant) =

Genus of flowering plants

Adelphia is a genus in the Malpighiaceae, a family of about 75 genera of flowering plants in the order Malpighiales. Adelphia comprises four species of woody vines native to the West Indies, Mesoamerica, and western South America.

== External links and references ==
- Malpighiaceae Malpighiaceae - description, taxonomy, phylogeny, and nomenclature
- Adelphia
- Anderson, W. R. 2006. Eight segregates from the neotropical genus Mascagnia (Malpighiaceae). Novon 16: 168–204.
