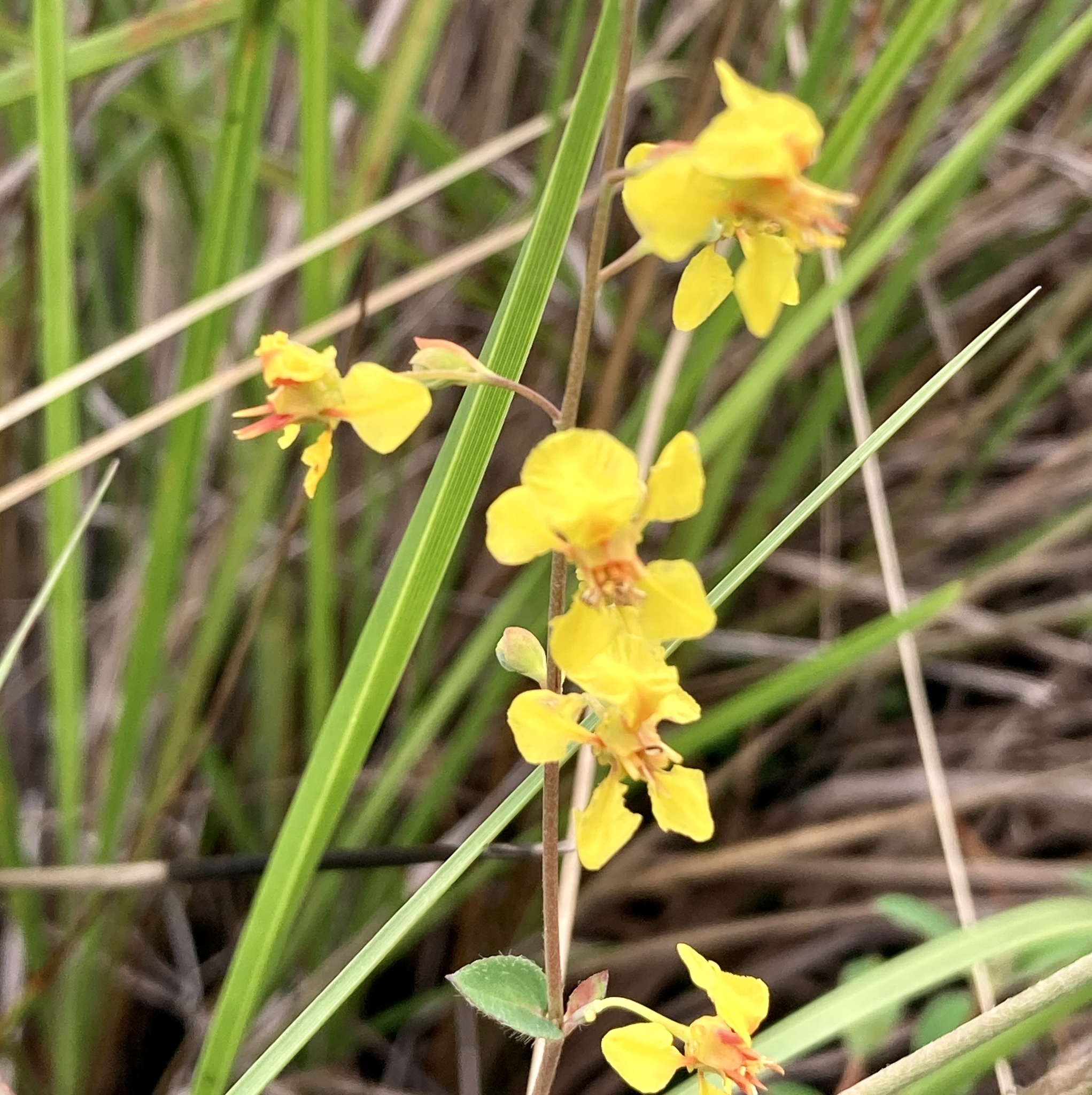
- Diacidia galphimioides

Scientific classification
- Kingdom: Plantae
- Clade: Tracheophytes
- Clade: Angiosperms
- Clade: Eudicots
- Clade: Rosids
- Order: Malpighiales
- Family: Malpighiaceae
- Genus: Diacidia; Griseb.

Species
- 11 species; see text

Synonyms
- Sipapoa Maguire

= Diacidia =

Genus of flowering plants

Diacidia is a genus in the family Malpighiaceae. It comprises 11 species of trees, shrubs, and subshrubs. Ten species (subg. Sipapoa) are found on the mountains of southern Venezuela and adjacent Brazil; one species (D. galphimioides) is widespread in the drainages of the Rio Negro and the Río Vaupés in Venezuela, Colombia, and Brazil.

== Species ==
- Diacidia aracaensis W. R. Anderson
- Diacidia cordata (Maguire) W. R. Anderson
- Diacidia ferruginea (Maguire & K. D. Phelps) W. R. Anderson
- Diacidia galphimioides Griseb. in Mart.
- Diacidia glaucifolia (Maguire) W. R. Anderson
- Diacidia hypoleuca (Maguire) W. R. Anderson
- Diacidia kunhardtii (Maguire) W. R. Anderson
- Diacidia rufa (Maguire) W. R. Anderson
- Diacidia steyermarkii (Maguire) W. R. Anderson
- Diacidia stipularis (Maguire & K. D. Phelps) W. R. Anderson
- Diacidia vestita (Benth.) B. D. Jacks.
