= Barnebya =

Scientific classification
- Kingdom: Plantae
- Clade: Tracheophytes
- Clade: Angiosperms
- Clade: Eudicots
- Clade: Rosids
- Order: Malpighiales
- Family: Malpighiaceae
- Genus: Barnebya; W.R.Anderson & B.Gates

Species
- Barnebya dispar W. R. Anderson & B. Gates; Barnebya harleyi W. R. Anderson & B. Gates

Genus of flowering plants

Barnebya is a genus in the Malpighiaceae, a family of about 75 genera of flowering plants in the order Malpighiales. Barnebya comprises 2 species of trees and woody vines native to eastern Brazil. The genus is named in honor of the American botanist Rupert Charles Barneby (1911–2006).

== References and external links ==
- Barnebya
- Malpighiaceae Malpighiaceae - description, taxonomy, phylogeny, and nomenclature
- Anderson, W. R., and B. Gates. 1981. Barnebya, a new genus of Malpighiaceae from Brazil. Brittonia 33: 275–284. 1981.
