= Christianella =

Scientific classification
- Kingdom: Plantae
- Clade: Tracheophytes
- Clade: Angiosperms
- Clade: Eudicots
- Clade: Rosids
- Order: Malpighiales
- Family: Malpighiaceae
- Genus: Christianella; W.R.Anderson

Species
- Christianella glandulifera (Cuatrec.) W. R. Anderson; Christianella mesoamericana (W. R. Anderson) W. R. Anderson; Christianella multiglandulosa (Nied.) W. R. Anderson; Christianella paludicola (W. R. Anderson) W. R. Anderson; Christianella surinamensis (Kosterm.) W. R. Anderson

Genus of flowering plants

Christianella is a genus in the Malpighiaceae, a family of about 75 genera of flowering plants in the order Malpighiales. Christianella comprises 5 species of woody vines and shrubby habit occurring in forests, roadside thickets, and shrubby savannas in southeastern Mexico, Central America, and South America.

== External links and reference ==
- Malpighiaceae Malpighiaceae - description, taxonomy, phylogeny, and nomenclature
- Christianella
- Anderson, W. R. 2006. Eight segregates from the neotropical genus Mascagnia (Malpighiaceae). Novon 16: 168–204.
