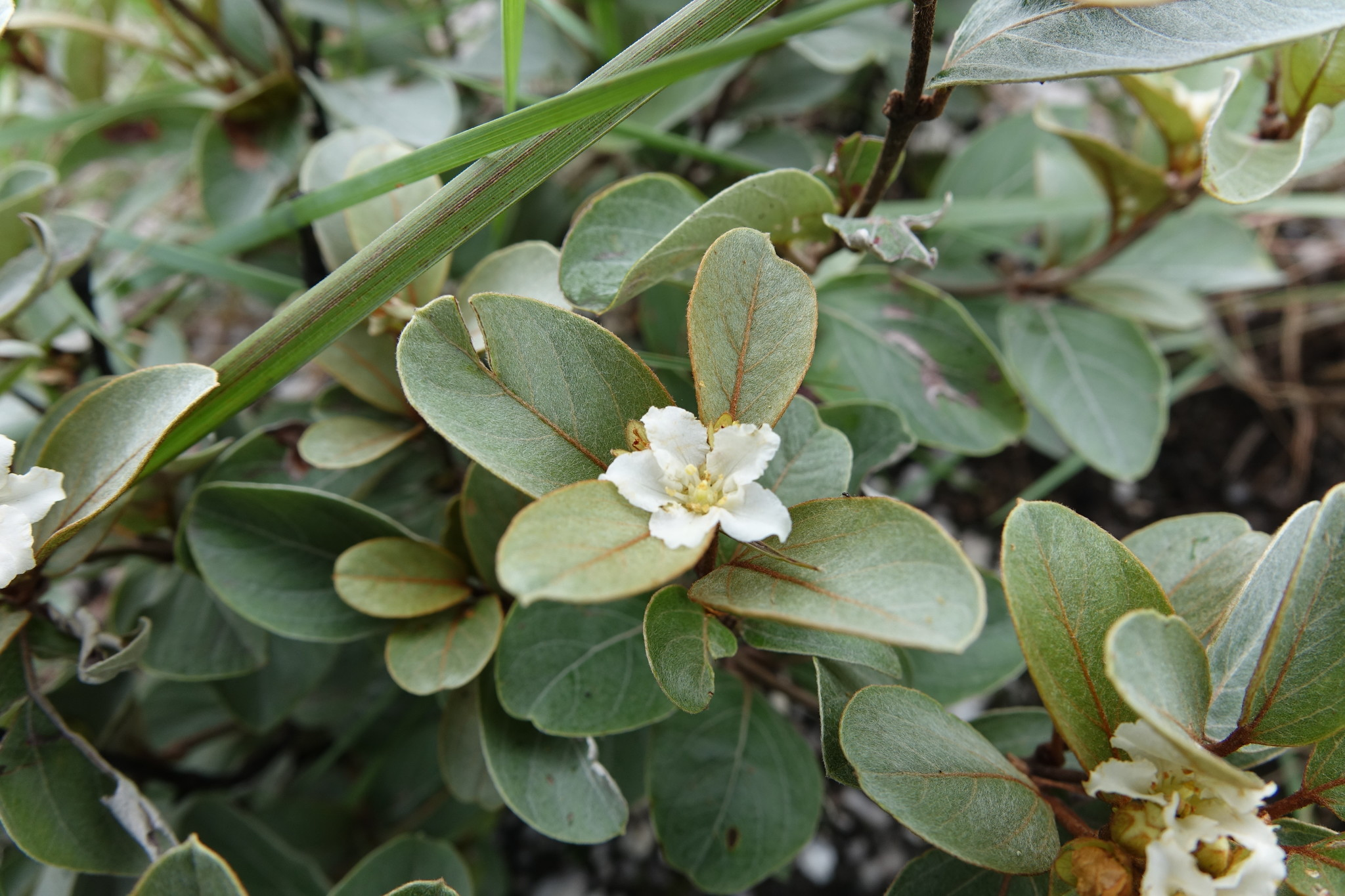
- Philgamia hibbertioides

Scientific classification
- Kingdom: Plantae
- Clade: Tracheophytes
- Clade: Angiosperms
- Clade: Eudicots
- Clade: Rosids
- Order: Malpighiales
- Family: Malpighiaceae
- Genus: Philgamia; Baill.

= Philgamia =

Genus of plants

Philgamia is a genus of flowering plants belonging to the family Malpighiaceae.

Its native range is Madagascar.

Species:

- Philgamia brachystemon Arènes
- Philgamia denticulata Arènes
- Philgamia glabrifolia Arènes
- Philgamia hibbertioides Baill.
