= Chlorohiptage =

Scientific classification
- Kingdom: Plantae
- Clade: Embryophytes
- Clade: Tracheophytes
- Clade: Angiosperms
- Clade: Eudicots
- Clade: Rosids
- Order: Malpighiales
- Family: Malpighiaceae
- Genus: Chlorohiptage; T.V.Do, T.A.Le & R.F.Almeida
- Species: C. vietnamensis

Binomial name
- Chlorohiptage vietnamensis T.V.Do, T.A.Le & R.F.Almeida

Genus of flowering plants

Chlorohiptage is a genus of flowering plants in the family Malpighiaceae. It includes a single species, Chlorohiptage vietnamensis, a woody scandent shrub with distinctive green flowers native to central Vietnam.

Chlorohiptage vietnamensis is currently known only from limestone areas of the Annamite Range in Cam Tuyen commune, Cam Lộ district, Quảng Trị province, Central Vietnam. It grows in open broadleaf evergreen rain forests and on limestone peaks from 100 to 250 meters elevation. Forest species predominant in its habitat include Pistacia weinmanniifolia, Tetrastigma quadridens, Pterospermum truncatolobatum, Phanera curtisii, and Jasminum subtriplinerve.

== Description ==
The genus and species were first described in 2024. The name Chlorohiptage combines the Greek words “chlorós” (= green) and “hiptamai” (= to fly), referring to the green flowers that distinguish the genus. Phylogenetic analysis found it to be most closely related to Hiptage, but distinguished from Hiptage by its valvate floral buds rather than imbricate, pale-green to yellowish-green petals rather than white to yellow, erose and velutine margins rather than dentate to fimbriate and glabrous, stamens 9 long + 1 short rather than 9 short + 1 long, three styles rather than 1 or 2, stamens shorter than stamen filaments rather than longer, and three-lobed mericarps with 1 lateral wing rather than with three free lateral wings.
