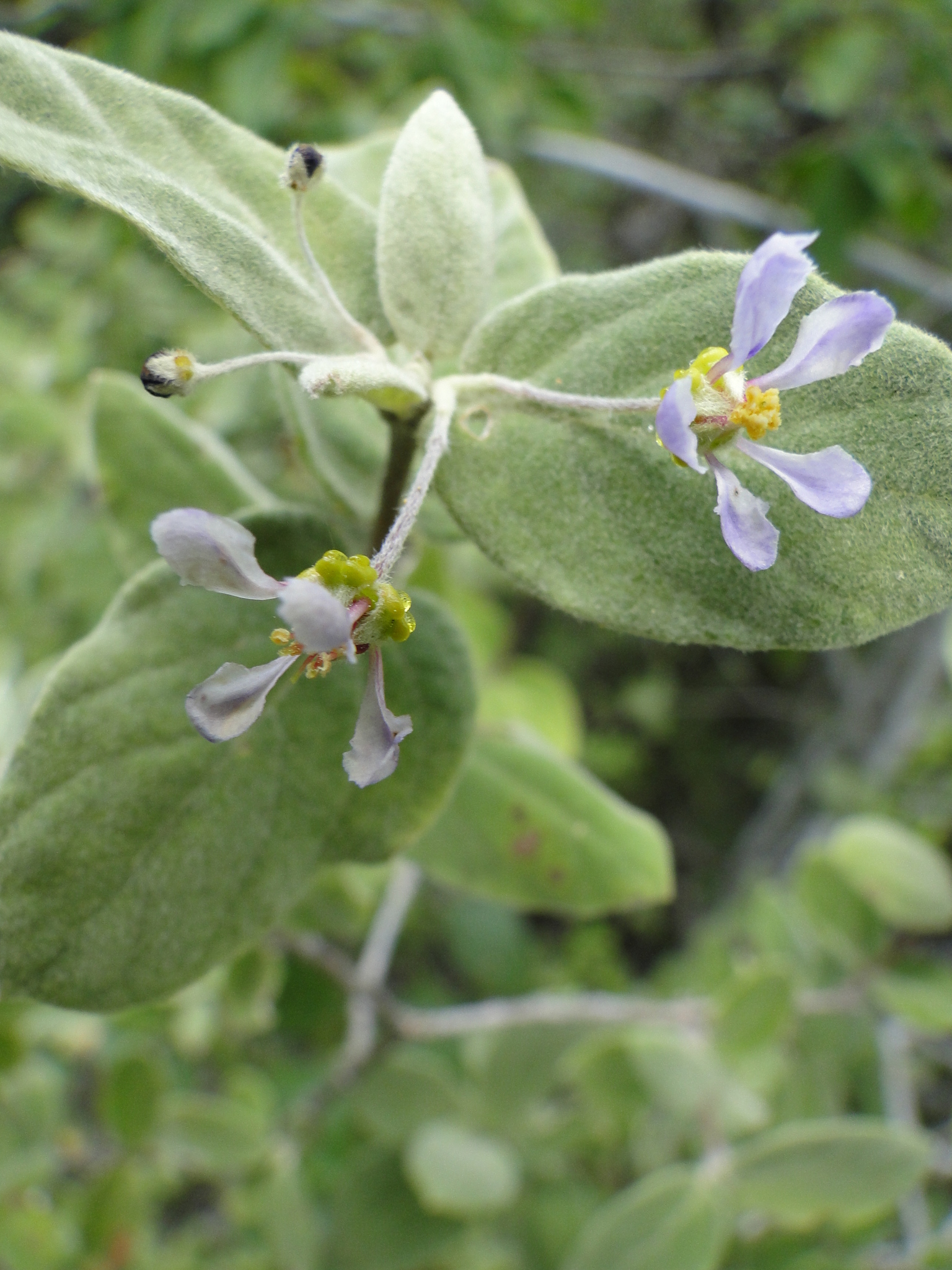
- Calcicola parvifolia

Scientific classification
- Kingdom: Plantae
- Clade: Tracheophytes
- Clade: Angiosperms
- Clade: Eudicots
- Clade: Rosids
- Order: Malpighiales
- Family: Malpighiaceae
- Genus: Calcicola; W.R.Anderson & C.Davis

Species
- Calcicola parvifolia (Adr. Juss.) W. R. Anderson & C. Davis; Calcicola sericea (Nied.) W. R. Anderson & C. Davis

= Calcicola =

Genus of flowering plants

Calcicola is a genus in the Malpighiaceae, a family of about 75 genera of flowering plants in the order Malpighiales. Calcicola comprises 2 species of shrubs or treelets native to Mexico.
