= Digoniopterys =

Scientific classification
- Kingdom: Plantae
- Clade: Tracheophytes
- Clade: Angiosperms
- Clade: Eudicots
- Clade: Rosids
- Order: Malpighiales
- Family: Malpighiaceae
- Genus: Digoniopterys; Arènes
- Species: D. microphylla

Binomial name
- Digoniopterys microphylla Arènes

Genus of flowering plants

Digoniopterys is a genus in the Malpighiaceae, a family of about 75 genera of flowering plants in the order Malpighiales. Digoniopterys contains only one species, Digoniopterys microphylla, a shrub known only from shrubby vegetation on sand dunes near the southwestern coast of Madagascar.
