= Glicophyllum =

Scientific classification
- Kingdom: Plantae
- Clade: Tracheophytes
- Clade: Angiosperms
- Clade: Eudicots
- Clade: Rosids
- Order: Malpighiales
- Family: Malpighiaceae
- Genus: Glicophyllum; R.F.Almeida (2021)

Species
- 26; see text

Genus of flowering plants

Glicophyllum is a genus of flowering plants in family Malpighiaceae. It includes 26 species native to the tropical Americas, ranging from southern Mexico to northern Argentina.

- Glicophyllum ambiguum (A.Juss.) R.F.Almeida
- Glicophyllum arcanum (C.V.Morton) R.F.Almeida
- Glicophyllum aristeguietae (W.R.Anderson) R.F.Almeida
- Glicophyllum cardiophyllum (Nied.) R.F.Almeida
- Glicophyllum chamaecerasifolium (A.Juss.) R.F.Almeida
- Glicophyllum fimbripetalum (A.Juss.) R.F.Almeida
- Glicophyllum gracile (W.R.Anderson) R.F.Almeida
- Glicophyllum hasslerianum (Nied.) R.F.Almeida
- Glicophyllum humile (A.Juss.) R.F.Almeida
- Glicophyllum jussieuanum (Nied.) R.F.Almeida
- Glicophyllum latibracteolatum (Nied.) R.F.Almeida
- Glicophyllum longibracteatum (A.Juss.) R.F.Almeida
- Glicophyllum maranhamense (A.Juss.) R.F.Almeida
- Glicophyllum microphyllum (A.Juss.) R.F.Almeida
- Glicophyllum oleifolium (Benth.) R.F.Almeida
- Glicophyllum paludosum (A.Juss.) R.F.Almeida
- Glicophyllum pohlianum (Nied.) R.F.Almeida
- Glicophyllum pusillum (Steyerm.) R.F.Almeida
- Glicophyllum racemulosum (A.Juss.) R.F.Almeida
- Glicophyllum ramiflorum (A.Juss.) R.F.Almeida
- Glicophyllum rhodopteron (Oliv.) R.F.Almeida
- Glicophyllum salicifolium (A.Juss.) R.F.Almeida
- Glicophyllum selerianum (Nied.) R.F.Almeida
- Glicophyllum stylopterum (A.Juss.) R.F.Almeida
- Glicophyllum turnerae (Mart. ex A.Juss.) R.F.Almeida
- Glicophyllum vacciniifolium (A.Juss.) R.F.Almeida
