= Lophopterys =

Scientific classification
- Kingdom: Plantae
- Clade: Tracheophytes
- Clade: Angiosperms
- Clade: Eudicots
- Clade: Rosids
- Order: Malpighiales
- Family: Malpighiaceae
- Genus: Lophopterys; A.Juss.

Species
- Lophopterys euryptera; Lophopterys floribunda; Lophopterys inpana; Lophopterys occidentalis; Lophopterys peruviana; Lophopterys spendens; Lophopterys surinamensis

Genus of flowering plants

Lophopterys is a genus in the Malpighiaceae. Lophopterys comprises seven species of woody vines and shrubs (or small trees?) of diverse habitats in South America south to about 23°.
