= Malpighiodes =

Scientific classification
- Kingdom: Plantae
- Clade: Tracheophytes
- Clade: Angiosperms
- Clade: Eudicots
- Clade: Rosids
- Order: Malpighiales
- Family: Malpighiaceae
- Genus: Malpighiodes; Nied.

Genus of flowering plants

Malpighiodes is a genus in the Malpighiaceae, a family of about 75 genera of flowering plants in the order Malpighiales. Malpighiodes comprises 4 species of woody vines native to northern South America. They are found in northern Brazil, French Guiana, Guyana, Suriname and Venezuela.

The genus name of Malpighiodes is in honour of Marcello Malpighi, a 17th-century Italian physician and botanist. The genus was circumscribed by Franz Josef Niedenzu Franz Josef Niedenzu in Arbeiten Bot. Inst. Königl. Lyceums Hosianum Braunsberg vol.3 on page 18 in 1908.

== Species ==
As accepted by Plants of the World Online;

- Malpighiodes bracteosa
  (Griseb.) W. R. Anderson
- Malpighiodes guianensis
  (W. R. Anderson) W. R. Anderson
- Malpighiodes leucanthele
  (Griseb.) W. R. Anderson
- Malpighiodes liesneri
  (W. R. Anderson) W. R. Anderson

== Other sources ==
- Anderson, W. R. 2006. Eight segregates from the neotropical genus Mascagnia (Malpighiaceae). Novon 16: 168–204.
