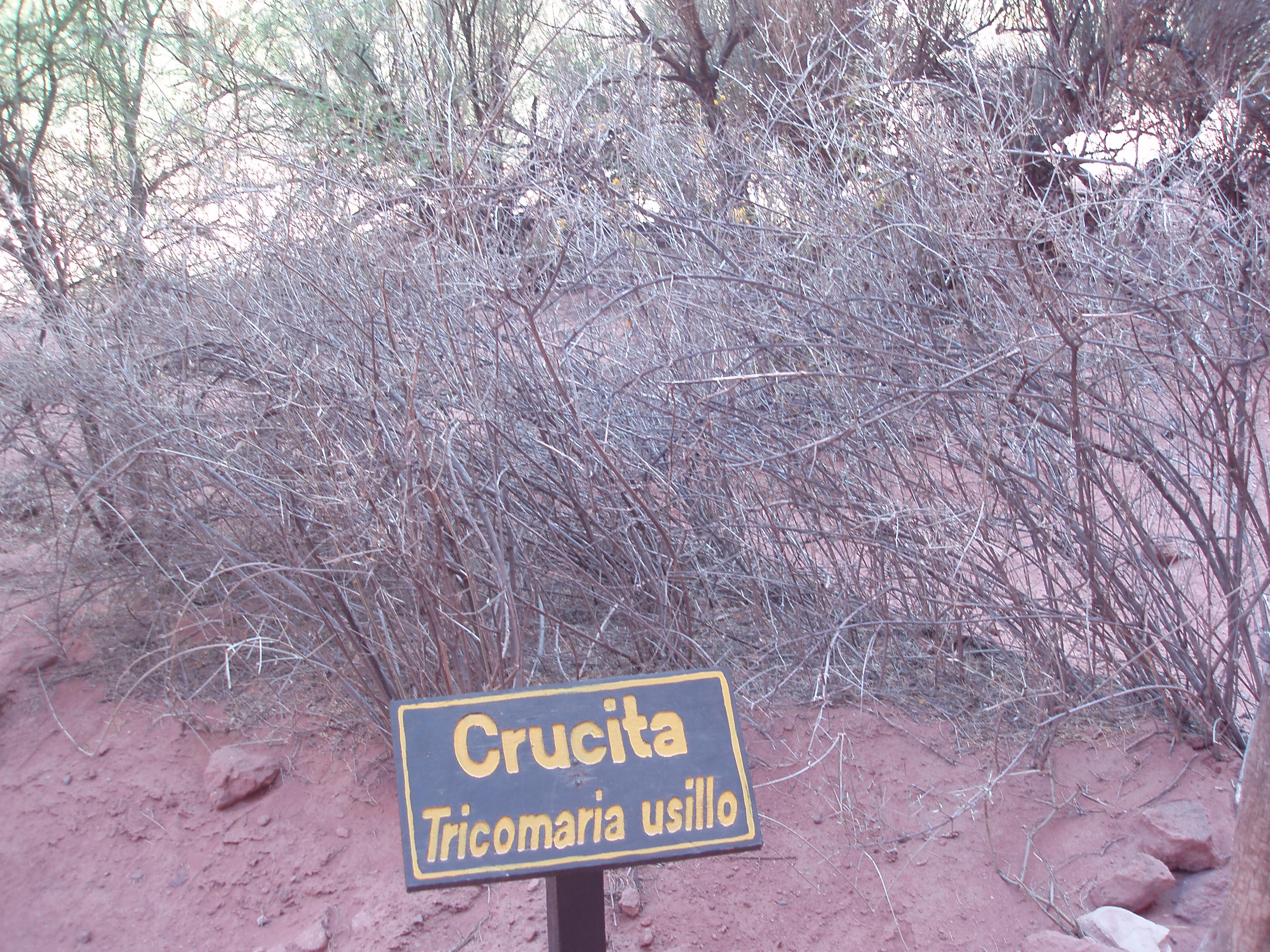
- Tricomaria usillo in Parque Nacional Talampaya, Argentina
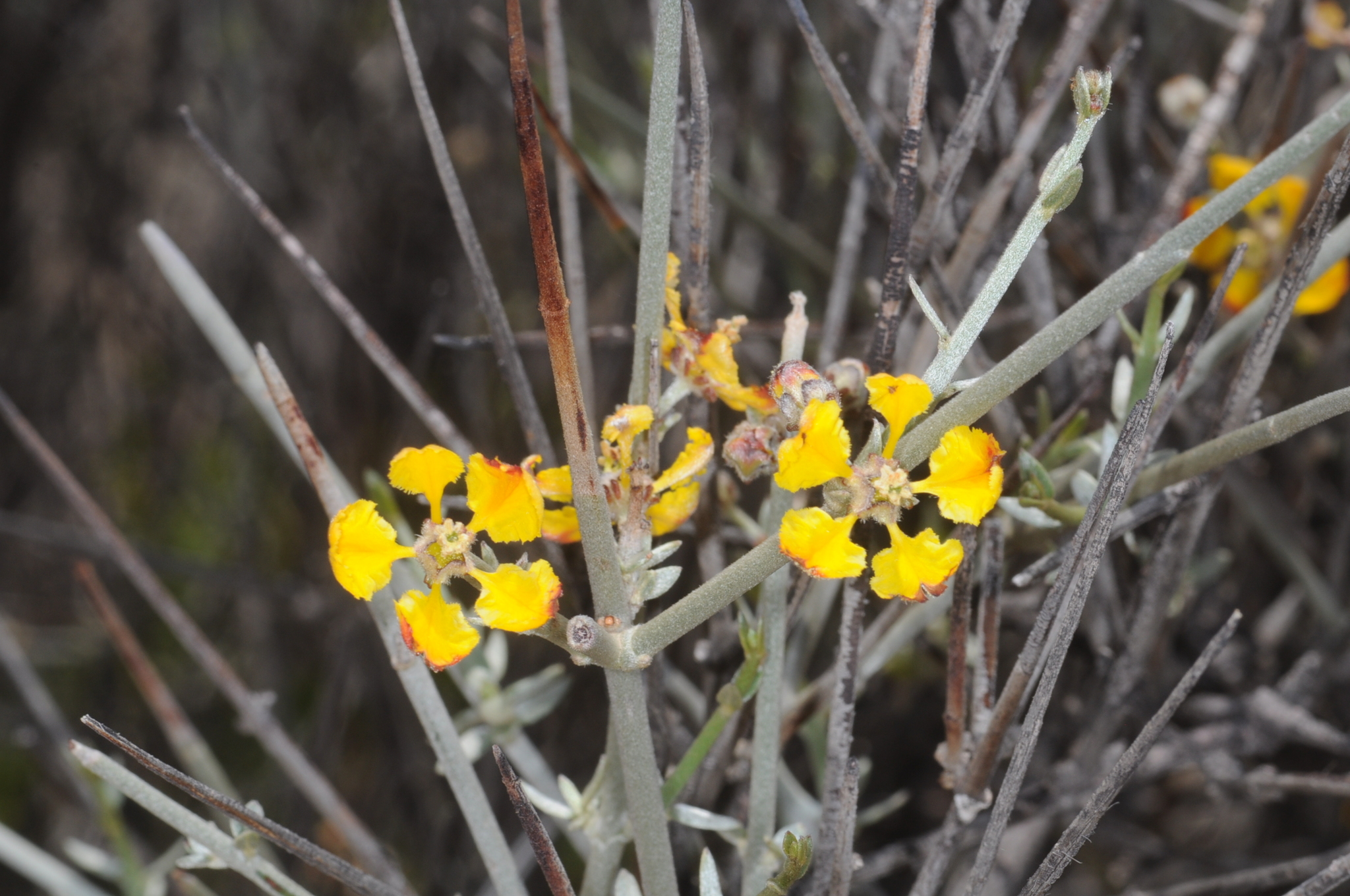
- Flowers

Scientific classification
- Kingdom: Plantae
- Clade: Tracheophytes
- Clade: Angiosperms
- Clade: Eudicots
- Clade: Rosids
- Order: Malpighiales
- Family: Malpighiaceae
- Genus: Tricomaria; Hook. & Arn.
- Species: T. usillo

Binomial name
- Tricomaria usillo Hook. & Arn.

= Tricomaria =

Genus of flowering plants

Tricomaria is a genus in the Malpighiaceae, a family of about 75 genera of flowering plants in the order Malpighiales. Tricomaria includes one species, Tricomaria usillo, which occurs in dry vegetation in western Argentina on the eastern side of the Andes.
