= Mamedea =

Scientific classification
- Kingdom: Plantae
- Clade: Tracheophytes
- Clade: Angiosperms
- Clade: Eudicots
- Clade: Rosids
- Order: Malpighiales
- Family: Malpighiaceae
- Subfamily: Malpighioideae
- Genus: Mamedea; R.F.Almeida & M.Pell.

Genus of flowering plants

Mamedea is a genus of flowering plants in the family Malpighiaceae. It includes six species native to South America, including eastern, central, and southern Brazil, Bolivia, Paraguay, Uruguay, and northern Argentina.

== Species ==
Six species are accepted.

- Mamedea boliviense (Nied.) R.F.Almeida & M.Pell.
- Mamedea harleyi (W.R.Anderson) R.F.Almeida & M.Pell.
- Mamedea pulchella (Griseb.) R.F.Almeida & M.Pell.
- Mamedea salicifolia (Chodat) R.F.Almeida & M.Pell.
- Mamedea sericea (Griseb.) R.F.Almeida & M.Pell.
- Mamedea uruguariensis (Nied.) R.F.Almeida & M.Pell.
