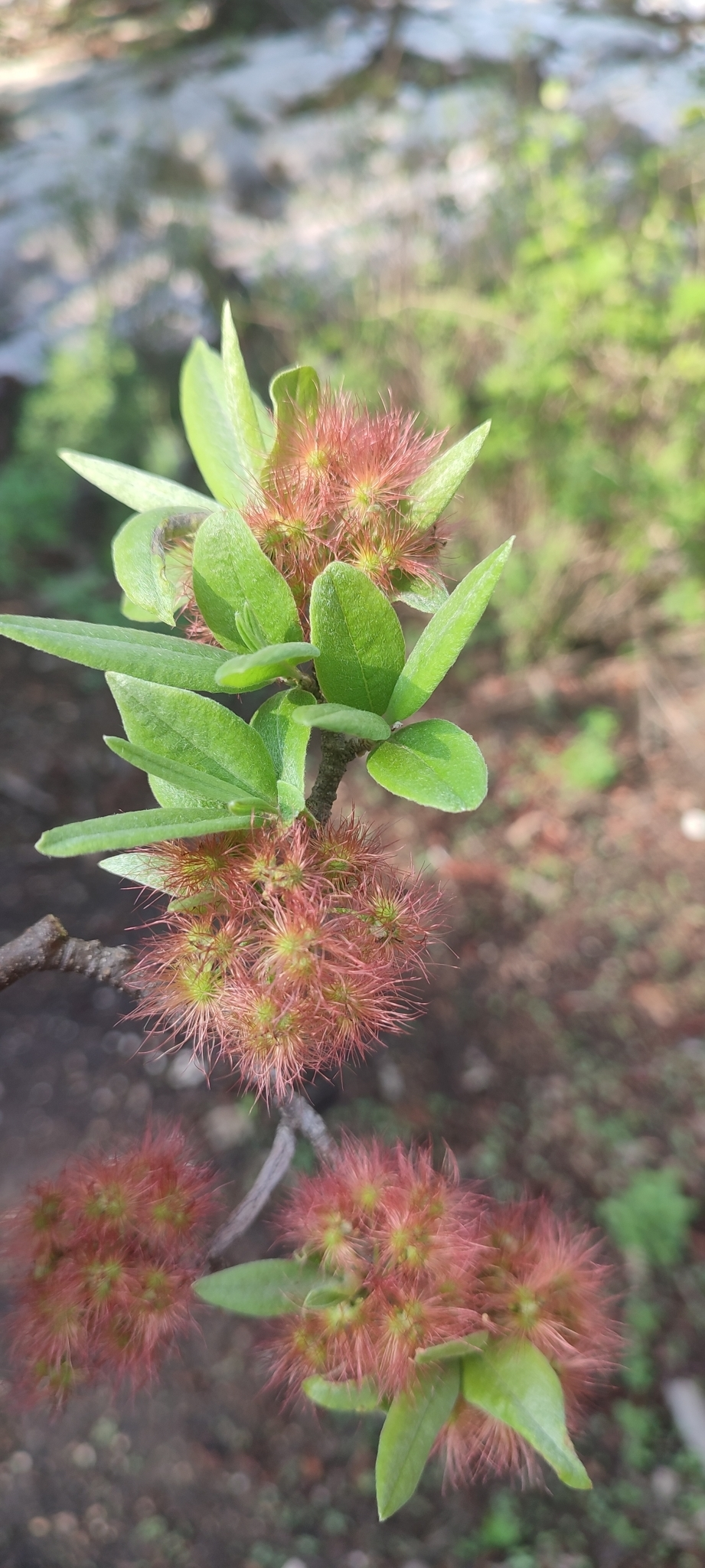
- Lasiocarpus ferrugineus

Scientific classification
- Kingdom: Plantae
- Clade: Tracheophytes
- Clade: Angiosperms
- Clade: Eudicots
- Clade: Rosids
- Order: Malpighiales
- Family: Malpighiaceae
- Genus: Lasiocarpus; Liebm.

= Lasiocarpus =

Genus of plants

Lasiocarpus is a genus of flowering plants belonging to the family Malpighiaceae.

Its native range is Mexico.

== Species ==
Species:

- Lasiocarpus ferrugineus Gentry
- Lasiocarpus ovalifolius Nied.
- Lasiocarpus salicifolius Liebm.
