= Bronwenia =

Scientific classification
- Kingdom: Plantae
- Clade: Tracheophytes
- Clade: Angiosperms
- Clade: Eudicots
- Clade: Rosids
- Order: Malpighiales
- Family: Malpighiaceae
- Genus: Bronwenia; W. R. Anderson & C. Davis

Species
- 10 species; see text

Genus of flowering plants

Bronwenia is a genus in the Malpighiaceae, a family of about 75 genera of flowering plants in the order Malpighiales. Bronwenia comprises 10 species of shrubs and woody vines native to Mexico, Central America, and South America.

== Species ==
- Bronwenia acapulcensis (Rose) W. R. Anderson & C. Davis
- Bronwenia brevipedicellata (B. Gates) W. R. Anderson & C. Davis
- Bronwenia cinerascens (Benth.) W. R. Anderson & C. Davis
- Bronwenia cornifolia (H. B. K.) W. R. Anderson & C. Davis
- Bronwenia ferruginea (Cav.) W. R. Anderson & C. Davis
- Bronwenia longipilifera (B. Gates) W. R. Anderson & C. Davis
- Bronwenia mathiasiae (W. R. Anderson) W. R. Anderson & C. Davis
- Bronwenia megaptera (B. Gates) W. R. Anderson & C. Davis
- Bronwenia peckoltii W. R. Anderson & C. Davis
- Bronwenia wurdackii (B. Gates) W. R. Anderson & C. Davis

== External link and references ==
- Malpighiaceae Malpighiaceae - description, taxonomy, phylogeny, and nomenclature
- Bronwenia
- Anderson, W. R., and C. Davis, 2007. Generic adjustments in Neotropical Malpighiaceae. Contributions from the University of Michigan Herbarium 25: 137–166.
