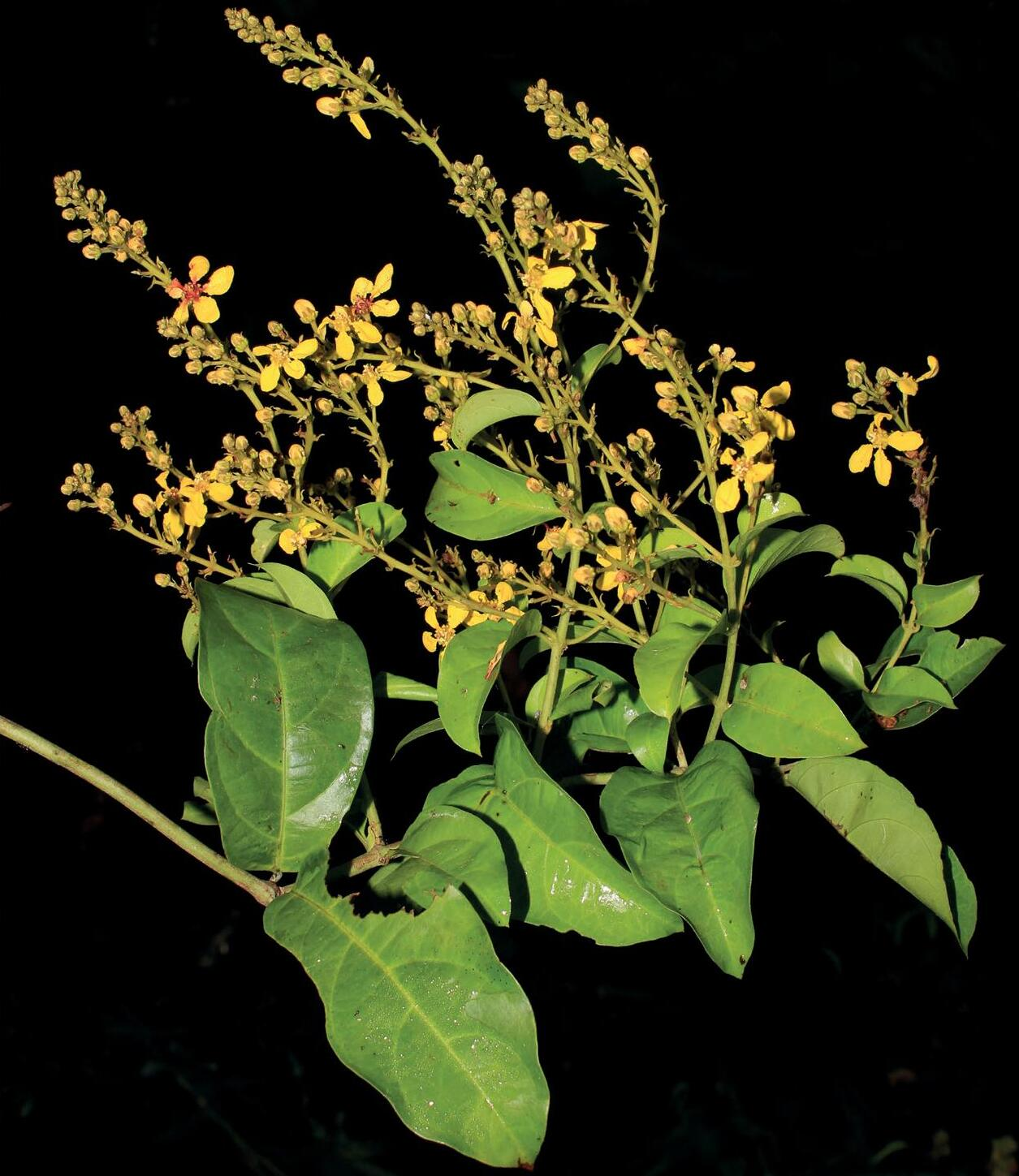
- Amorimia amazonica

Scientific classification
- Kingdom: Plantae
- Clade: Tracheophytes
- Clade: Angiosperms
- Clade: Eudicots
- Clade: Rosids
- Order: Malpighiales
- Family: Malpighiaceae
- Genus: Amorimia; W. R. Anderson
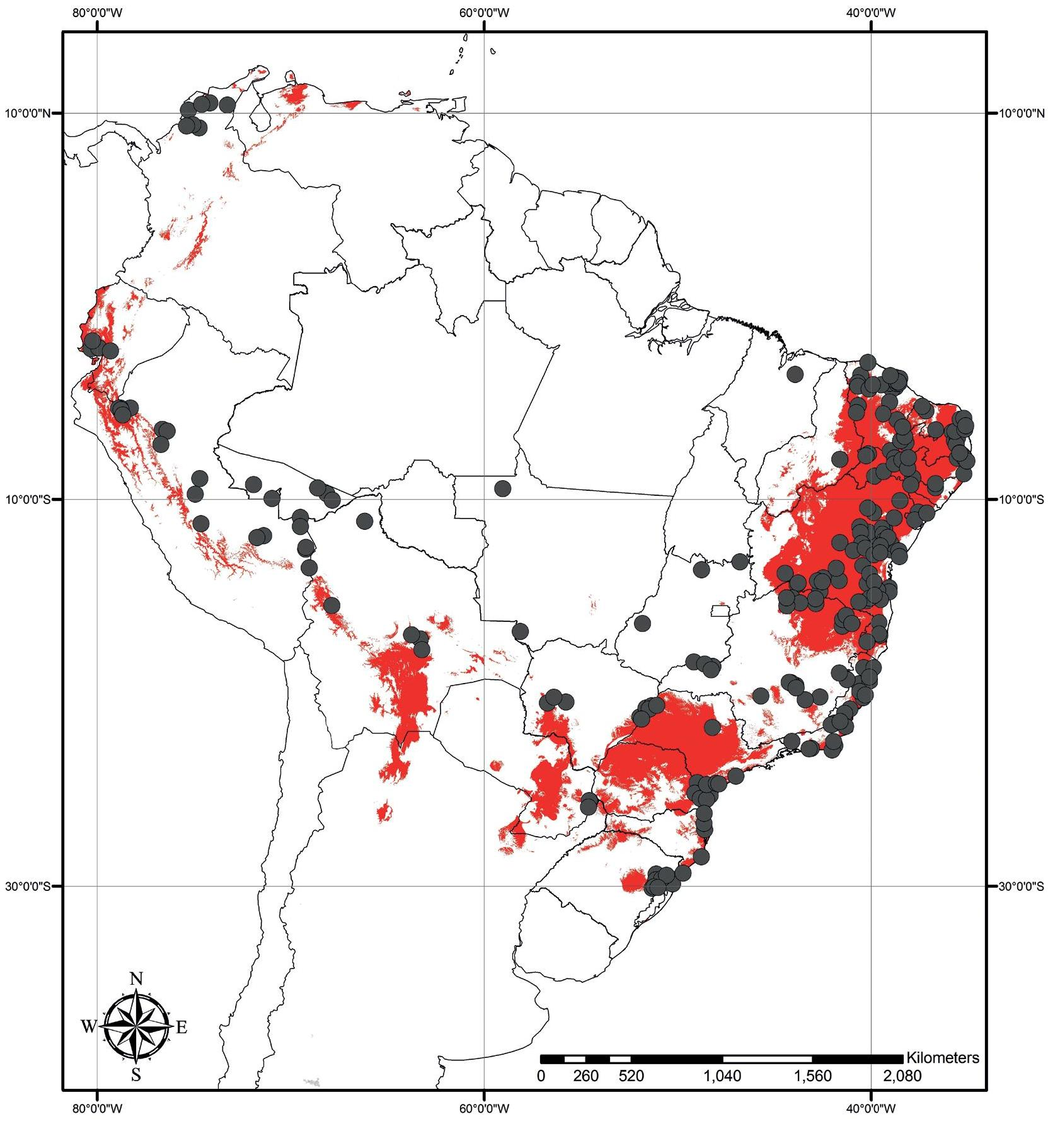
- Distribution of Amorimia in South America dry forests

= Amorimia =

Genus of flowering plants

Amorimia is a genus in the Malpighiaceae, a family of about 75 genera of flowering plants in the order Malpighiales. Amorimia comprises ten species of woody vines native to South America.
