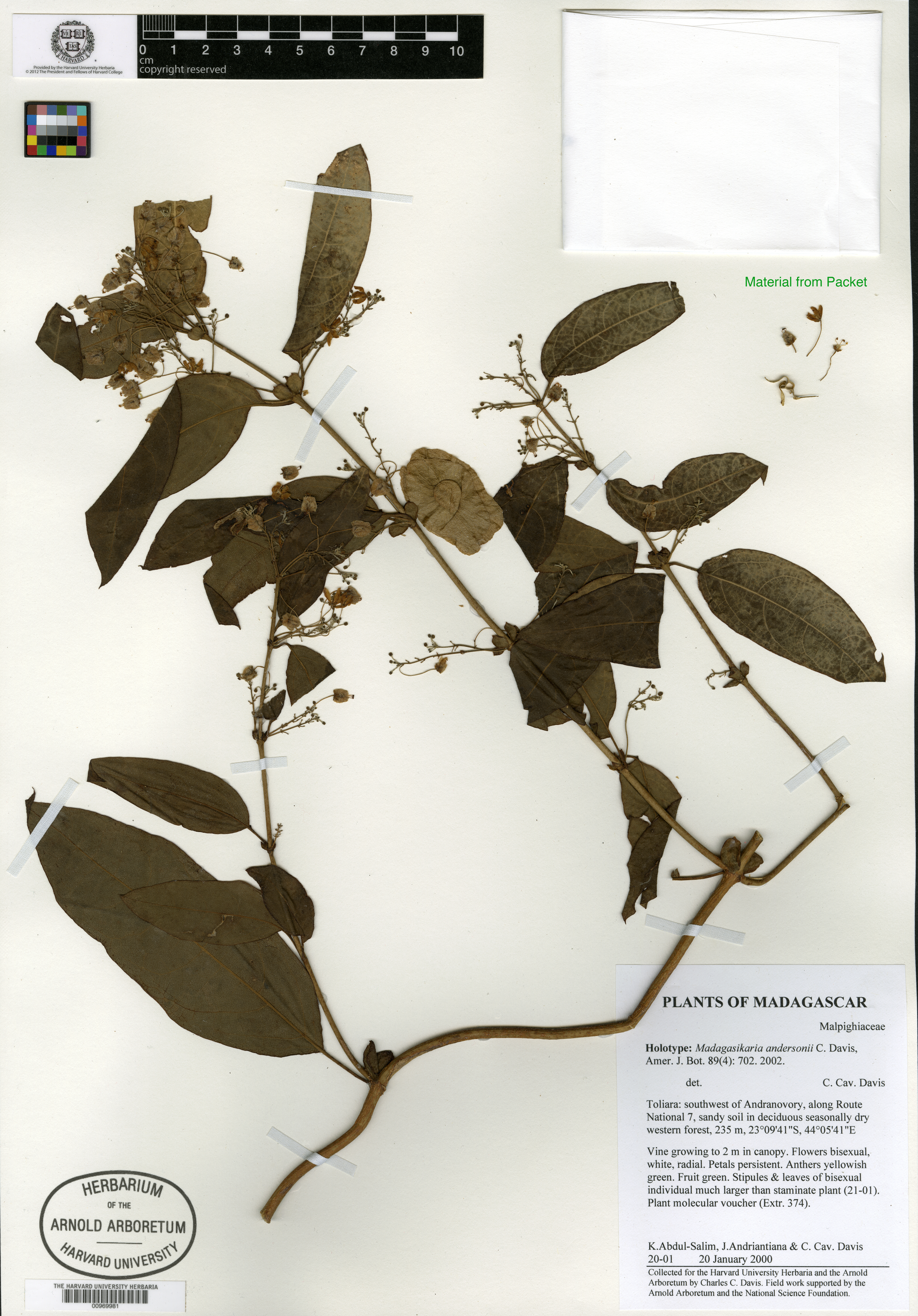

Scientific classification
- Kingdom: Plantae
- Clade: Tracheophytes
- Clade: Angiosperms
- Clade: Eudicots
- Clade: Rosids
- Order: Malpighiales
- Family: Malpighiaceae
- Genus: Madagasikaria; C.Davis
- Species: M. andersonii

Binomial name
- Madagasikaria andersonii C.Davis

= Madagasikaria =

Genus of flowering plants

Madagasikaria is a genus in the Malpighiaceae, a family of about 75 genera of flowering plants in the order Malpighiales. Madagasikaria contains only one species (Madagasikaria andersonii) of woody vine native to deciduous seasonally dry forest of Madagascar.
