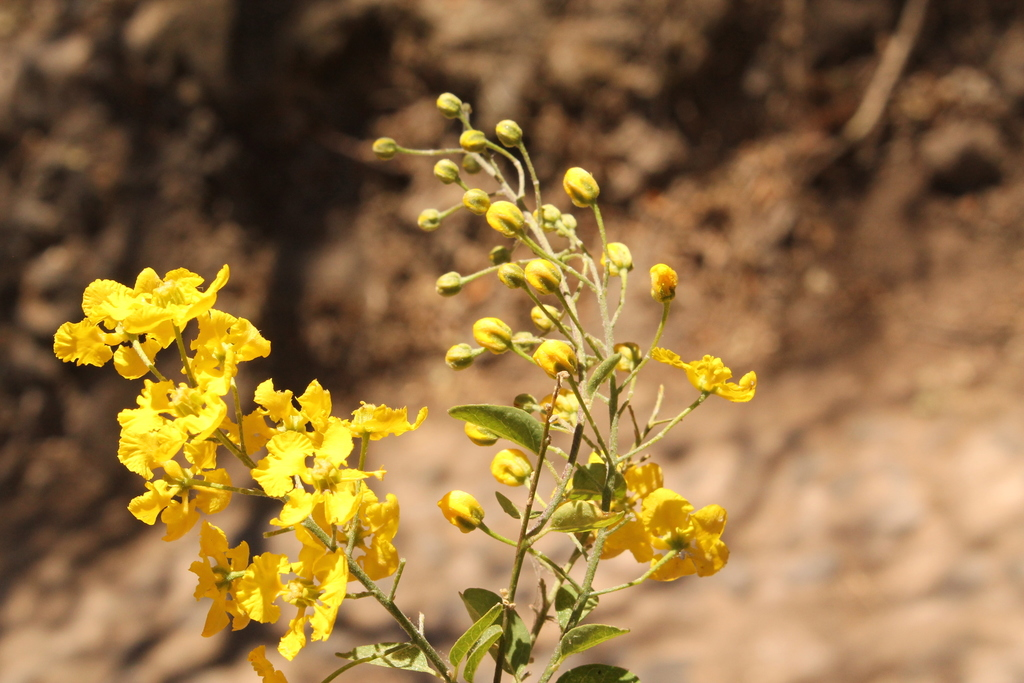

Scientific classification
- Kingdom: Plantae
- Clade: Tracheophytes
- Clade: Angiosperms
- Clade: Eudicots
- Clade: Rosids
- Order: Malpighiales
- Family: Malpighiaceae
- Genus: Echinopterys; A.Juss.

Species
- Echinopterys glandulosa (Adr. Juss.) Small; Echinopterys setosa Brandegee

= Echinopterys =

Genus of flowering plants

Echinopterys is a genus in the Malpighiaceae, a family of about 75 genera of flowering plants in the order Malpighiales. Echinopterys comprises 2 species of shrubs or woody vines native to dry habitats of Mexico and is distinctive in its bristly fruits.
