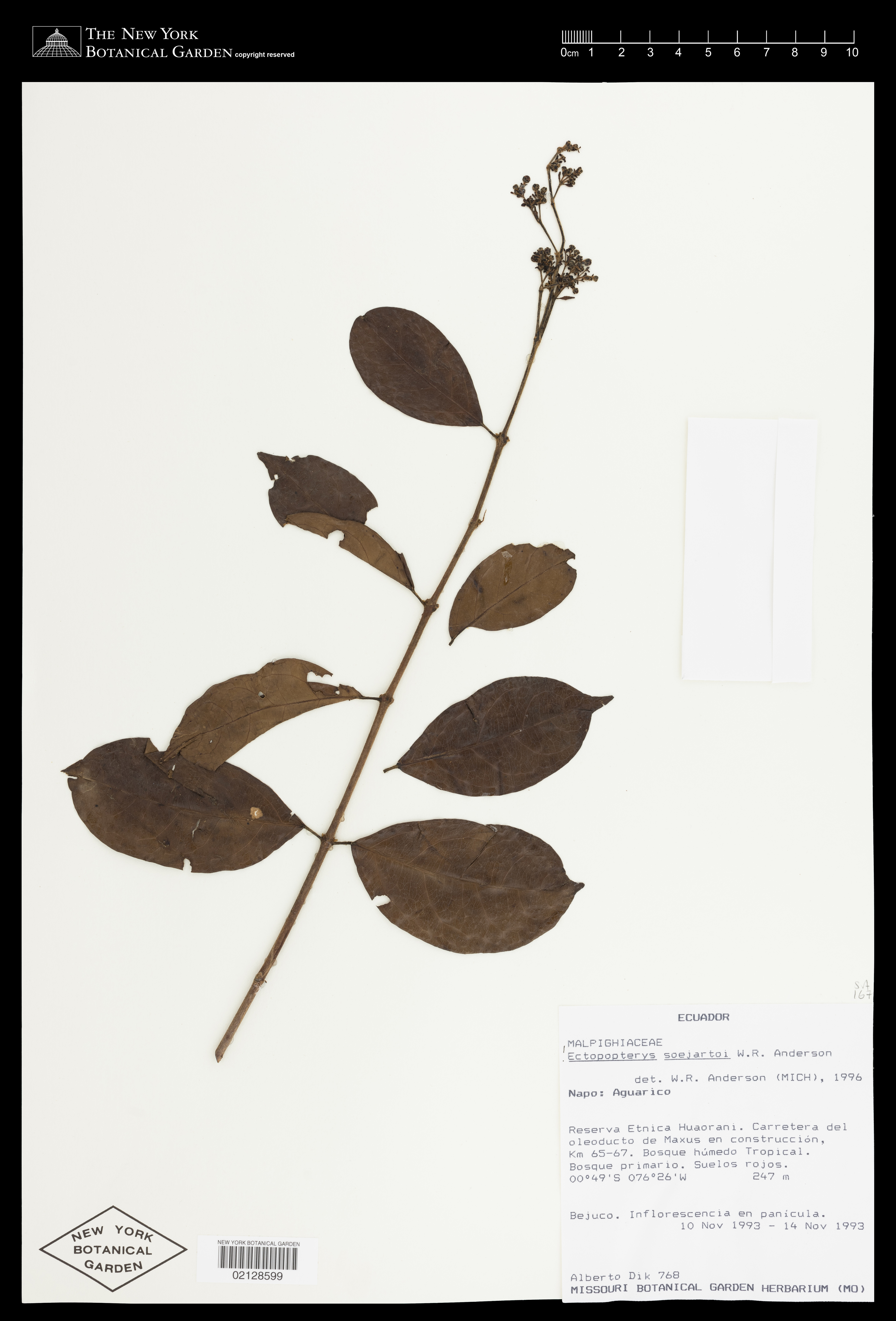

Scientific classification
- Kingdom: Plantae
- Clade: Tracheophytes
- Clade: Angiosperms
- Clade: Eudicots
- Clade: Rosids
- Order: Malpighiales
- Family: Malpighiaceae
- Genus: Ectopopterys; W. R. Anderson
- Species: E. soejartoi

Binomial name
- Ectopopterys soejartoi W.R.Anderson

= Ectopopterys =

Genus of flowering plants

Ectopopterys is a genus in the Malpighiaceae, a family of about 75 genera of flowering plants in the order Malpighiales. Ectopopterys contains only one species (Ectopopterys soejartoi) of woody vines native to lowland wet forests of Colombia, Ecuador, and Peru.
