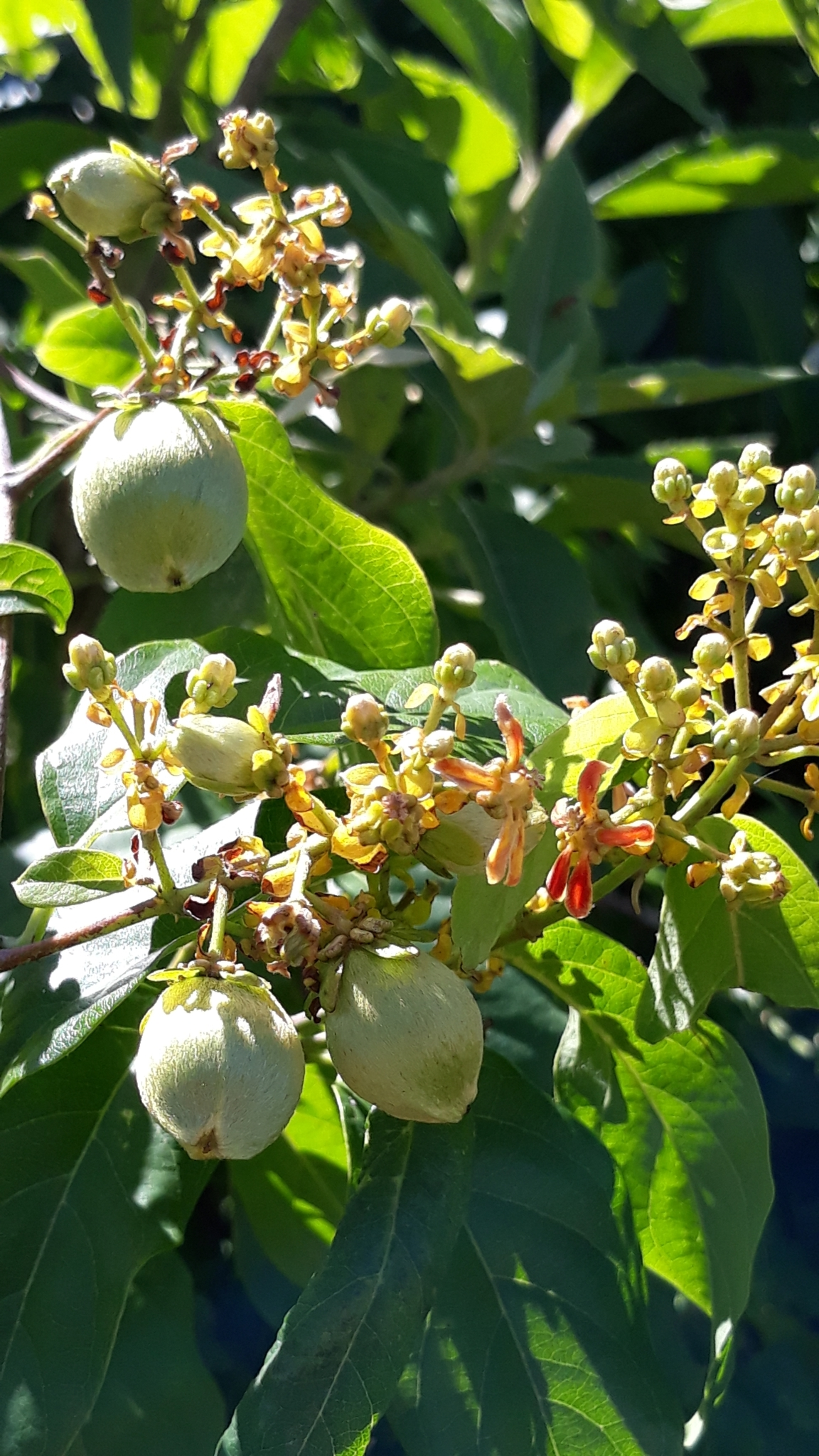
- Dicella nucifera

Scientific classification
- Kingdom: Plantae
- Clade: Tracheophytes
- Clade: Angiosperms
- Clade: Eudicots
- Clade: Rosids
- Order: Malpighiales
- Family: Malpighiaceae
- Genus: Dicella; Griseb.

Species
- See text

= Dicella =

Genus of flowering plants

Dicella is a genus of flowering plants in the family Malpighiaceae.

== Species ==
The genus includes seven species, assigned to two sections.

=== Section Dicella ===
- Dicella bracteosa (Adr. Juss.) Griseb.
- Dicella nucifera Chodat - found in southeastern Brazil and adjacent Paraguay and Argentina

=== Section Macropterys ===
- Dicella aciculifera W. R. Anderson - known only from Costa Rica
- Dicella conwayi Rusby
- Dicella julianii (J. F. Macbr.) W. R. Anderson
- Dicella macroptera Adr. Juss.
- Dicella oliveirae M. W. Chase - all of South America from Colombia to about 19°S.
