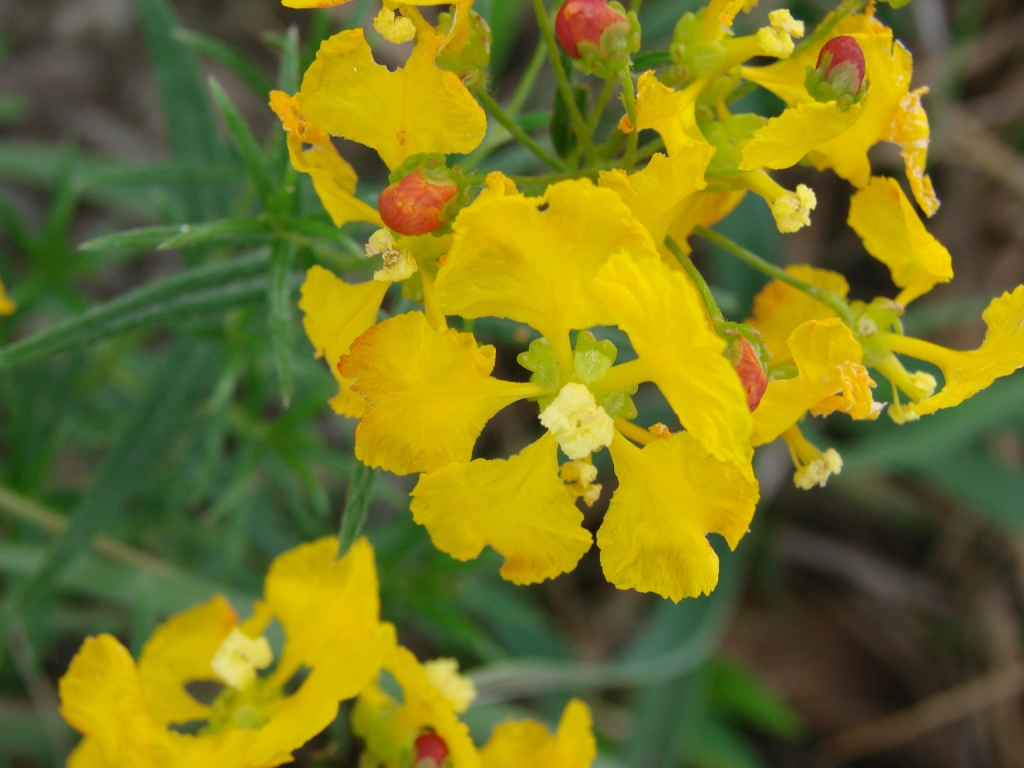
- Camarea ericoides

Scientific classification
- Kingdom: Plantae
- Clade: Tracheophytes
- Clade: Angiosperms
- Clade: Eudicots
- Clade: Rosids
- Order: Malpighiales
- Family: Malpighiaceae
- Genus: Camarea; A.St.-Hil.

= Camarea =

Genus of flowering plants

Camarea is a genus of flowering plants belonging to the family Malpighiaceae.

Its native range is Eastern Southern America.

Species:

- Camarea affinis A.St.-Hil.
- Camarea axillaris A.St.-Hil.
- Camarea elongata Mamede
- Camarea ericoides A.St.-Hil.
- Camarea glazioviana Nied.
- Camarea hirsuta A.St.-Hil.
- Camarea humifusa W.R.Anderson
- Camarea sericea A.St.-Hil.
- Camarea triphylla Mart. ex A.Juss.
