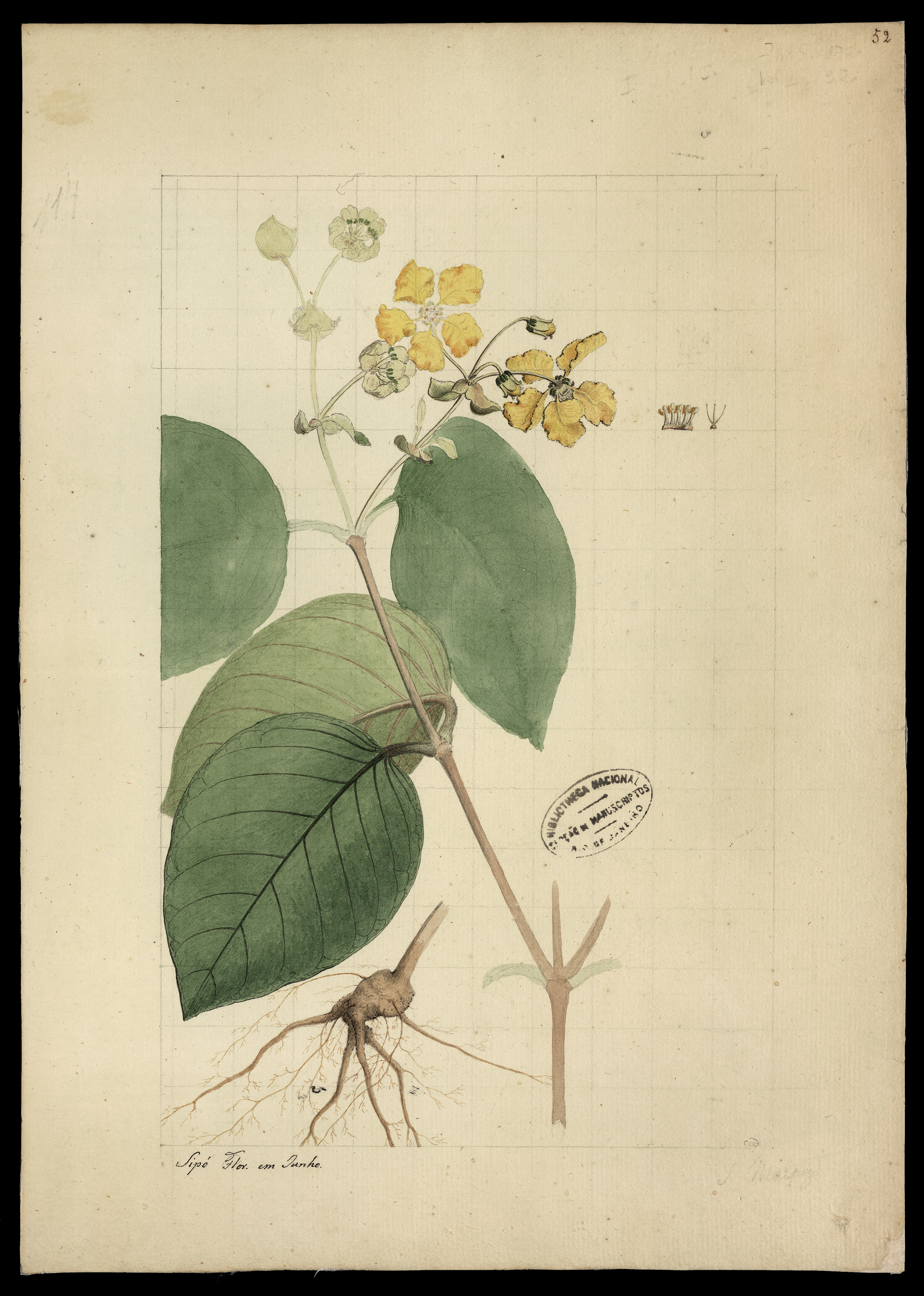

Scientific classification
- Kingdom: Plantae
- Clade: Tracheophytes
- Clade: Angiosperms
- Clade: Eudicots
- Clade: Rosids
- Order: Malpighiales
- Family: Malpighiaceae
- Genus: Acmanthera (Adr. Juss.) Griseb.

Species
- Acmanthera cowanii W. R. Anderson; Acmanthera duckei W. R. Anderson; Acmanthera fernandesii W. R. Anderson; Acmanthera latifolia (Adr. Juss.) Griseb. in Mart.; Acmanthera longifolia Nied.; Acmanthera minima W. R. Anderson; Acmanthera parviflora W. R. Anderson

= Acmanthera =

Genus of flowering plants

Acmanthera is a genus in the Malpighiaceae, a family of about 75 genera of flowering plants in the order Malpighiales. Acmanthera comprises seven species of trees, shrubs, or subshrubs native to Brazil.
