= Blepharandra =

Scientific classification
- Kingdom: Plantae
- Clade: Tracheophytes
- Clade: Angiosperms
- Clade: Eudicots
- Clade: Rosids
- Order: Malpighiales
- Family: Malpighiaceae
- Genus: Blepharandra; Griseb.

Species
- Blepharandra angustifolia (H. B. K.) W. R. Anderson; Blepharandra cachimbensis W. R. Anderson; Blepharandra fimbriata MacBryde; Blepharandra heteropetala W. R. Anderson; Blepharandra hypolceuca (Benth.) Griseb.; Blepharandra intermedia W. R. Anderson

Synonyms
- Callyntranthele Nied.

Genus of flowering plants

Blepharandra is a genus in the family Malpighiaceae. It comprises 6 species of trees and shrubs native to sandy savannas and scrub forests of Guyana, southern Venezuela, and Amazonian Brazil.
