= Burdachia =

Scientific classification
- Kingdom: Plantae
- Clade: Tracheophytes
- Clade: Angiosperms
- Clade: Eudicots
- Clade: Rosids
- Order: Malpighiales
- Family: Malpighiaceae
- Genus: Burdachia; Mart. ex Endl.

Species
- Burdachia duckei Steyerm.; Burdachia prismatocarpa Adr. Juss.; Burdachia sphaerocarpa Adr. Juss.

Genus of flowering plants

Burdachia is a genus in the Malpighiaceae, a family of about 75 genera of flowering plants in the order Malpighiales. Burdachia comprises 3 species of trees and shrubs occurring in lowland forests near rivers or in low, periodically flooded places in Guyana and Amazonian Venezuela, Colombia, Brazil, and Peru.
