= Caucanthus =

Scientific classification
- Kingdom: Plantae
- Clade: Tracheophytes
- Clade: Angiosperms
- Clade: Eudicots
- Clade: Rosids
- Order: Malpighiales
- Family: Malpighiaceae
- Genus: Caucanthus; Forssk.

Genus of flowering plants

Caucanthus is a genus of flowering plants belonging to the family Malpighiaceae.

Its native range is Tropical Africa, Arabian Peninsula.

Species:

- Caucanthus albidus (Nied.) Nied.
- Caucanthus auriculatus (Radlk.) Nied.
- Caucanthus edulis Forssk.
