= Glandonia =

Scientific classification
- Kingdom: Plantae
- Clade: Tracheophytes
- Clade: Angiosperms
- Clade: Eudicots
- Clade: Rosids
- Order: Malpighiales
- Family: Malpighiaceae
- Genus: Glandonia; Griseb.

Species
- Glandonia macrocarpa Griseb.; Glandonia prancei W.R.Anderson; Glandonia williamsii Steyerm.

Genus of flowering plants

Glandonia is a genus of flowering plant in the family Malpighiaceae. It comprises 3 species of trees or shrubs native to lowland forests along rivers or in areas periodically flooded in Amazonian Colombia, Venezuela, and Brazil.
