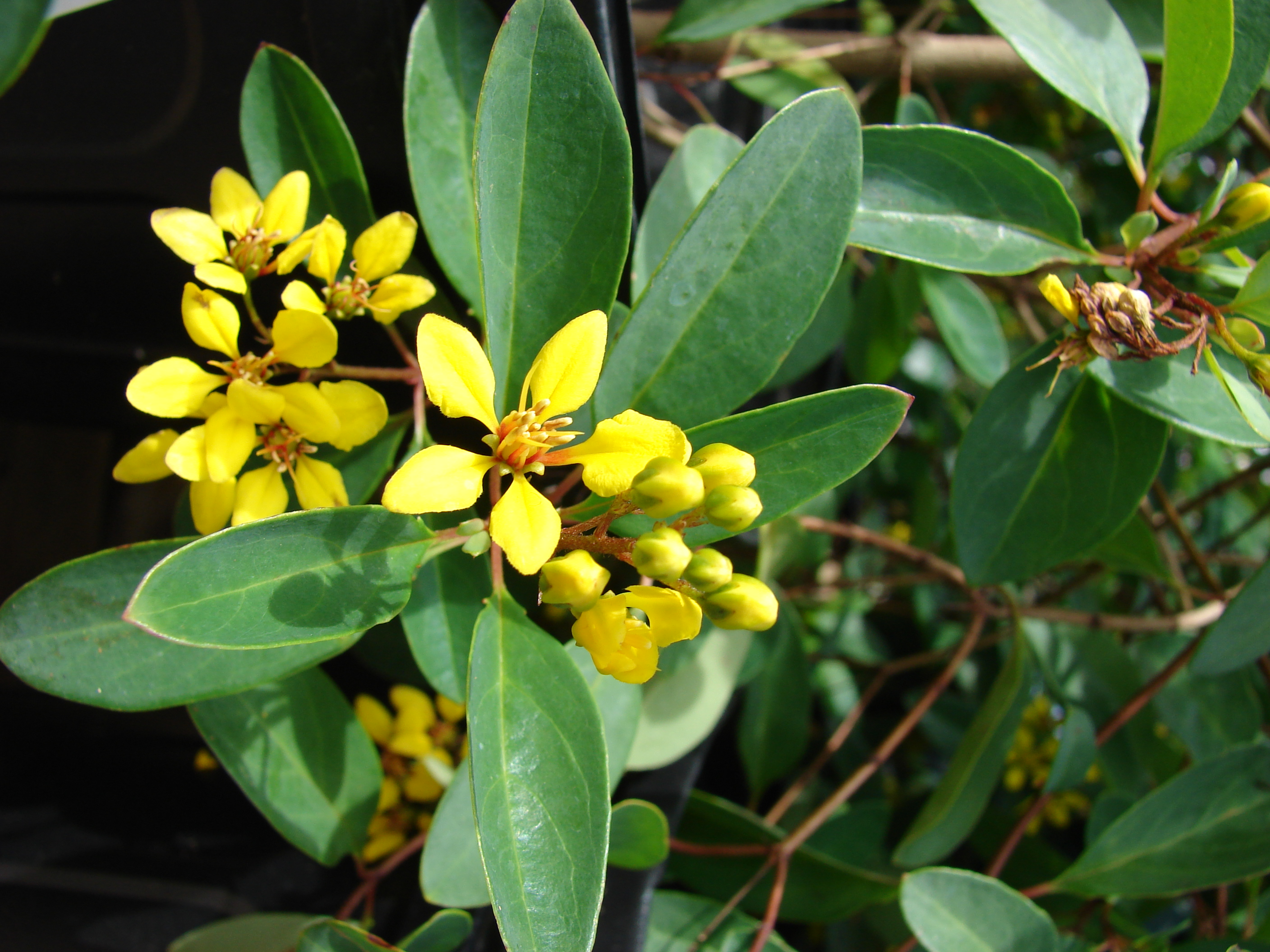
- Galphimia gracilis

Scientific classification
- Kingdom: Plantae
- Clade: Tracheophytes
- Clade: Angiosperms
- Clade: Eudicots
- Clade: Rosids
- Order: Malpighiales
- Family: Malpighiaceae; Juss.

Genera
- See text

= Malpighiaceae =

Malpighiaceae Temporal range: Eocene - recent

Family of flowering plants

Malpighiaceae is a family of flowering plants in the order Malpighiales. It comprises about 71 genera and 1315 species, all of which are native to the tropics and subtropics. About 80% of the genera and 90% of the species occur in the New World (the Caribbean and the southernmost United States to Argentina) and the rest in the Old World (Africa, Madagascar, and Indomalaya to New Caledonia and the Philippines).

One useful species in the family is Malpighia emarginata, often called acerola. The fruit is consumed in areas where the plant is native. The plant is cultivated elsewhere for the fruit, which is rich in vitamin C.

Another member of the family, caapi or yagé (Banisteriopsis caapi), is used in the entheogenic brew known as ayahuasca.

One feature found in several members of this family, and rarely in others, is providing pollinators with rewards other than pollen or nectar; this is commonly in the form of nutrient oils (resins are offered by Clusiaceae).

== Genera ==
71 genera are accepted.

- Acmanthera (Juss.) Griseb.
- Acridocarpus Guill., Perr. & A.Rich.
- Adelphia W.R.Anderson
- Alicia W.R.Anderson
- Amorimia W.R.Anderson
- Aspicarpa Rich. (synonym Gaudichaudia Kunth)
- Aspidopterys A.Juss. ex Endl.
- Banisteriopsis C.B.Rob.
- Barnebya W.R.Anderson & B.Gates
- Blepharandra Griseb.
- Brachylophon Oliv.
- Bronwenia W.R.Anderson & C.Davis
- Bunchosia Rich. ex Kunth
- Burdachia A.Juss. ex Endl.
- Byrsonima Rich. ex Kunth
- Calcicola W.R.Anderson & C.Davis
- Callaeum Small
- Camarea A.St.-Hil.
- Carolus W.R.Anderson
- Caucanthus Forssk.
- Chlorohiptage T.V.Do, T.A.Le & R.F.Almeida
- Christianella W.R.Anderson
- Coleostachys A.Juss.
- Cottsia Dubard & Dop
- Diacidia Griseb.
- Dicella Griseb.
- Digoniopterys Arènes
- Dinemandra A.Juss. ex Endl. (synonym Dinemagonum A.Juss.)
- Diplopterys A.Juss.
- Echinopterys A.Juss.
- Ectopopterys W.R.Anderson
- Excentradenia W.R.Anderson
- Flabellaria Cav.
- Flabellariopsis R.Wilczek
- Galphimia Cav.
- Glandonia Griseb.
- Glicophyllum R.F.Almeida
- Heladena A.Juss. (synonym Henleophytum H.Karst.)
- Heteropterys Kunth
- Hiptage Gaertn.
- Hiraea Jacq.
- Janusia A.Juss. ex Endl.
- Jubelina A.Juss.
- Lasiocarpus Liebm.
- Lophanthera A.Juss.
- Lophopterys A.Juss.
- Madagasikaria C.Davis
- Malpighia Plum. ex L.
- Malpighiodes Nied.
- Mamedea R.F.Almeida & M.Pell.
- Mascagnia (Bertero ex DC.) Bertero
- Mcvaughia W.R.Anderson
- Mezia Schwacke ex Nied.
- Microsteira Baker
- Mionandra Griseb. (synonyms Cordobia Nied. and Gallardoa Hicken)
- Niedenzuella W.R.Anderson
- Peixotoa A.Juss.
- Philgamia Baill.
- Psychopterys W.R.Anderson & S.Corso
- Pterandra A.Juss.
- Ptilochaeta Turcz.
- Rhynchophora Arènes
- Schwannia Endl.
- Spachea A.Juss.
- Sphedamnocarpus Planch. ex Benth. & Hook.f.
- Stigmaphyllon A.Juss.
- Tetrapterys Cav.
- Thryallis Mart.
- Triaspis Burch.
- Tricomaria Gillies ex Hook. & Arn.
- Tristellateia Thouars
- Verrucularina Rauschert
