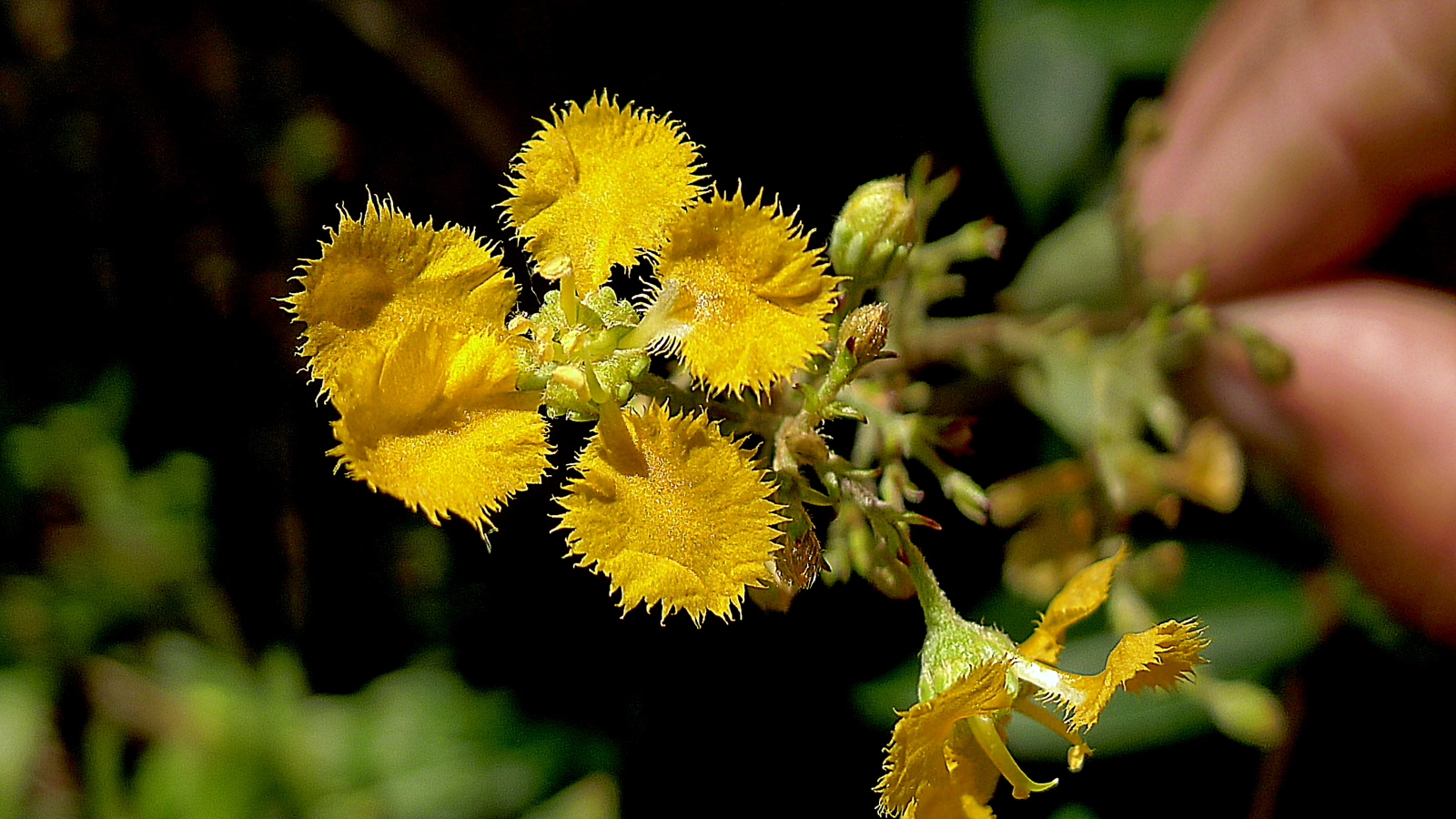
- Image of Janusia anisandra

Scientific classification
- Kingdom: Plantae
- Clade: Tracheophytes
- Clade: Angiosperms
- Clade: Eudicots
- Clade: Rosids
- Order: Malpighiales
- Family: Malpighiaceae
- Subfamily: Malpighioideae
- Genus: Janusia; A.Juss. ex Endl.

Synonyms
- Peregrina W.R.Anderson

= Janusia (plant) =

Genus of flowering plants

Janusia is a genus of flowering plants in the family Malpighiaceae. It includes 11 species native to South America, from Brazil to Bolivia, Paraguay, Uruguay, and northern Argentina.

== Species ==
11 species are accepted.

- Janusia christianeae W.R.Anderson
- Janusia diminuta R.Sebast. & Mamede
- Janusia guaranitica (A.St.-Hil.) A.Juss.
- Janusia hexandra (Vell.) W.R.Anderson
- Janusia linearifolia (A.St.-Hil.) A.Juss.
- Janusia longibracteolata Amorim & R.Sebast.
- Janusia mediterranea (Vell.) W.R.Anderson
- Janusia occhionii W.R.Anderson
- Janusia paraensis R.Sebast. & Mamede
- Janusia prancei W.R.Anderson
- Janusia schwannioides W.R.Anderson

=== Formerly placed here ===
- Schwannia anisandra A.Juss. (as Janusia anisandra (A.Juss.) Griseb.)
