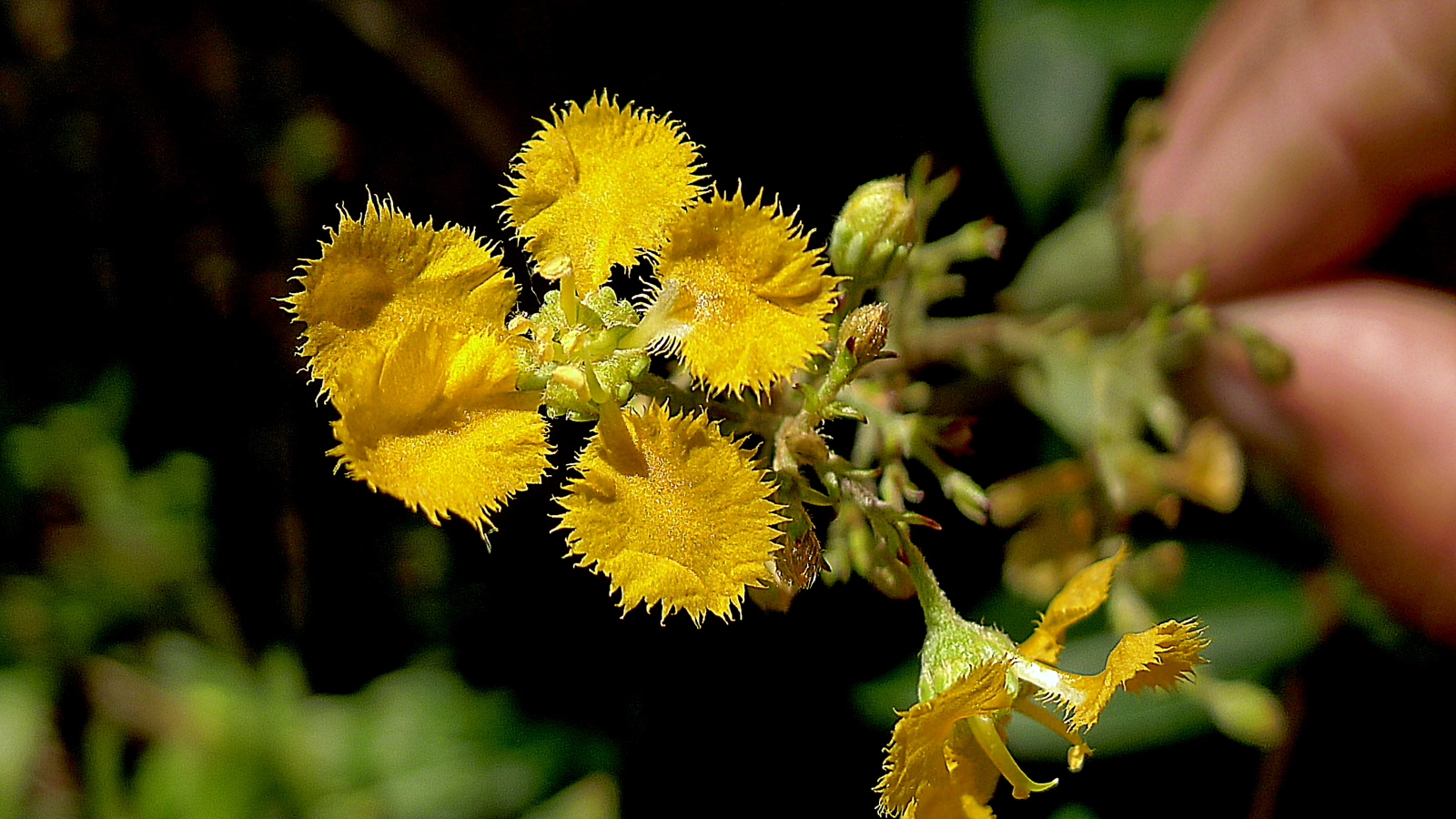
- Schwannia anisandra

Scientific classification
- Kingdom: Plantae
- Clade: Tracheophytes
- Clade: Angiosperms
- Clade: Eudicots
- Clade: Rosids
- Order: Malpighiales
- Family: Malpighiaceae
- Subfamily: Malpighioideae
- Genus: Schwannia; Endl.

Synonyms
- Fimbriaria A.Juss.

= Schwannia =

Genus of flowering plants

Schwannia is a genus of flowering plants in the family Malpighiaceae. It includes five species native to Venezuela and northern and central Brazil.

== Species ==
Five species are accepted.

- Schwannia anisandra A.Juss.
- Schwannia caudata A.Juss.
- Schwannia janusioides A.Juss.
- Schwannia lindmanii Skottsb.
- Schwannia malmeana Nied.
