= Jubelina =

Scientific classification
- Kingdom: Plantae
- Clade: Tracheophytes
- Clade: Angiosperms
- Clade: Eudicots
- Clade: Rosids
- Order: Malpighiales
- Family: Malpighiaceae
- Genus: Jubelina; A.Juss.

Species
- Jubelina grisebachiana W.R.Anderson; Jubelina magnifica W.R.Anderson; Jubelina riparia A.Juss.; Jubelina rosea (Miq.) Nied.; Jubelina uleana (Nied.) Cuatrec.; Jubelina wilburii W.R.Anderson

Genus of flowering plants

Jubelina is a genus in the Malpighiaceae family, a family of about 75 genera of flowering plants in the Malpighiales order. Jubelina comprises six species of woody vines that occur in tropical wet primary and secondary forests of Central America and South America.

== External links and references ==
- Malpighiaceae - description, taxonomy, phylogeny, and nomenclature
- Jubelina
- Anderson, W. R. 1990a. The taxonomy of Jubelina (Malpighiaceae). Contributions from the University of Michigan Herbarium, 17: 21–37.
