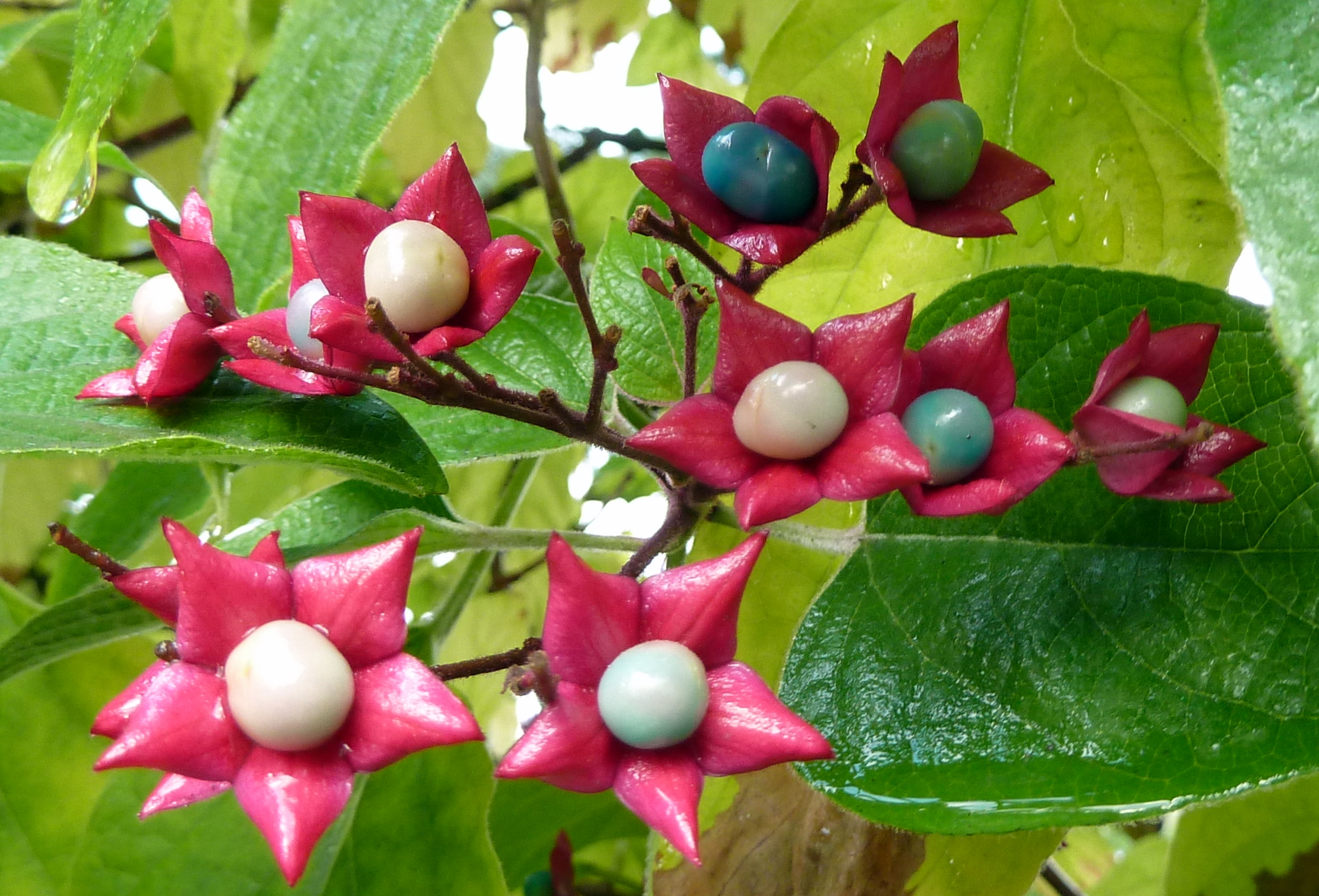

Conservation status
- Least Concern (IUCN 3.1)

Scientific classification
- Kingdom: Plantae
- Clade: Tracheophytes
- Clade: Angiosperms
- Clade: Eudicots
- Clade: Asterids
- Order: Lamiales
- Family: Lamiaceae
- Genus: Clerodendrum
- Species: C. trichotomum

Binomial name
- Clerodendrum trichotomum Thunb.

= Clerodendrum trichotomum =

Species of flowering plant

Clerodendrum trichotomum, the harlequin glorybower, glorytree or peanut butter tree, is a species of flowering plant in the family Lamiaceae. It is native to China, Korea, Taiwan, Japan, India, and the Philippines.

It is cultivated for its fragrant flowers, autumn color, and ornamental berries, which contain the novel blue pigment trichotomine.

== Etymology ==
Clerodendrum is derived from Greek; klero means chance and dendro means tree, so the name together translates to 'chance tree'. Trichotomum is also derived from Greek, and means 'three-forked' or 'triple-branched'.

In Japanese, this plant is called クサギ (kusagi, or "smelly tree"). It is not the only plant which is called this in Japanese, but is the primary plant associated with the name.

== Description ==
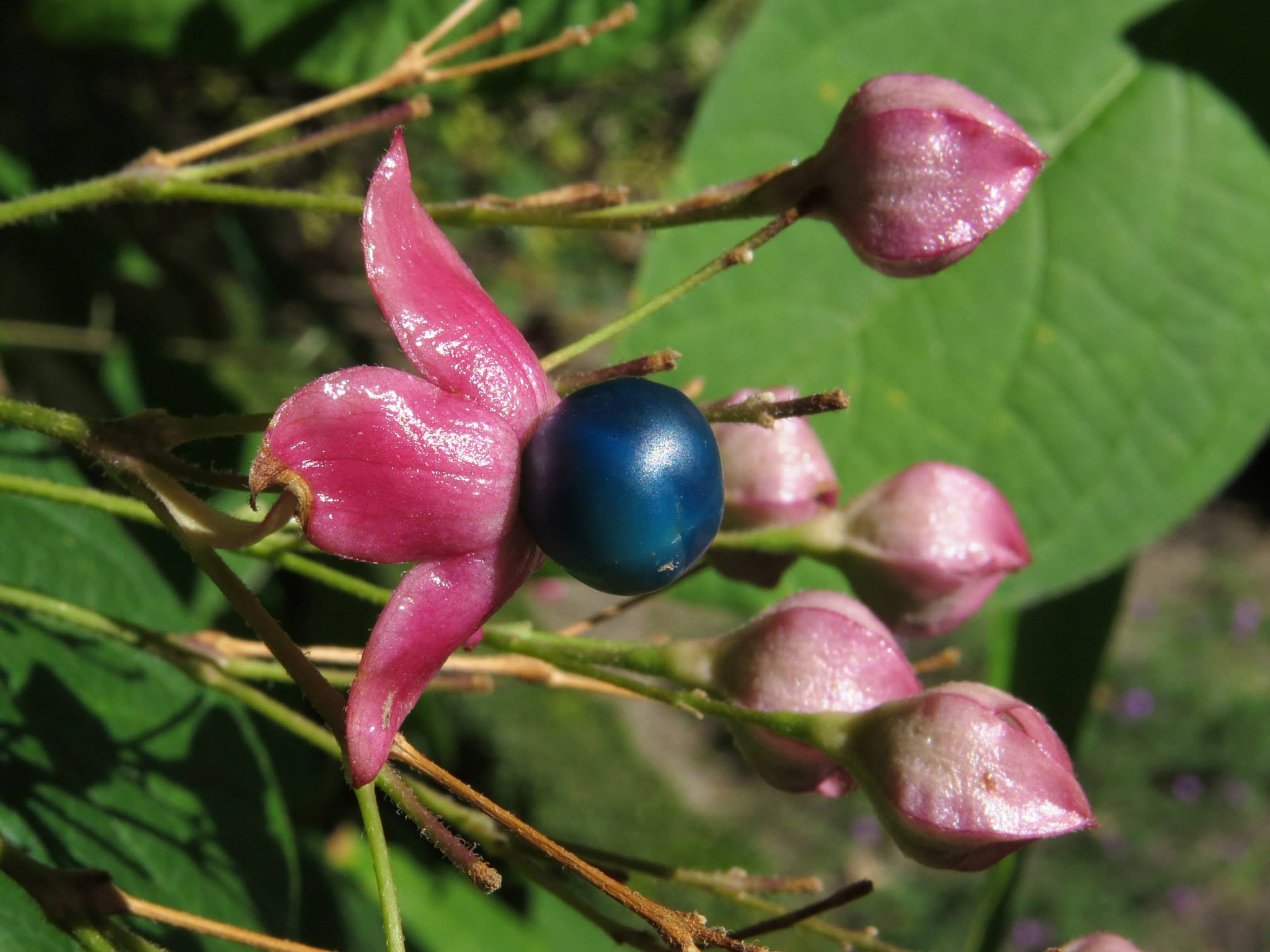
The mature berries are faintly iridescent.

The leaves are dark green, ovate, up to 12 cm (5 in) long, soft and downy or hairy, and produce a "peanut butter" odor when crushed. Some varieties have toothed leaves. These leaves do not change color in fall, instead falling off of the tree still green with the first frost of the season. The fragrant flowers are borne on branching peduncles. They have 5 white petals, held within a green calyx which turns red as the fruits ripen. The flowers are not self-pollinating, so at least two plants are needed to produce fruit. The fruits (drupes) are white, changing to bright blue and eventually dark blue on maturity. The flowers appear in late summer and early autumn, and the berries can remain on the tree well into the winter season. Flowers and mature fruits can occur at the same time. The bark is brown, grey, has a smooth or lightly fissured texture, and has many lenticels.

It creates basal shoots continually and can grow 3–6 metres (10–20 ft) high, so it can either be shaped into a shrub, or can grow into a tree if it is allowed to grow tall, does not die back in the winter, and has the shoots trimmed.

It is deciduous, moderately drought tolerant, and is one of the most hardy of its genus, growing in USDA zones 7 through 10. It can grow in full sun or partial shade, but blooms best in full sun and prefers to grow near protective structures like walls; in exposed gardens, mulching in winter is often recommended to protect the plant. It prefers fertile, moist, well-drained soil, but tolerates soils that are acidic, loamy, sandy, or clay containing. It is reportedly easy to transplant, grows back well from roots, and according to the JC Raulston Arboretum, it can be propagated "from seed or cuttings taken from partially hardened wood in early summer and rooted under mist."

Common pests that affect C. trichotomum include whiteflies, mealybugs, and aphids.

=== Varieties ===
The variety C. trichotomum var. fargesii (Farges' harlequin glorybower) and the cultivar C. trichotomum var. fargesii 'Carnival' have gained the Royal Horticultural Society's Award of Garden Merit (confirmed 2017). C. trichotomum var. faregesii is noted for its especially strong fragrance, even relative to other varieties within the same species.

The "Stargazer" variety has variegated leaves and the flowers have yellow margins.

== Usage and distribution ==
The plant is cultivated decoratively, especially in areas like Europe and the Americas where it is not native; it is especially popular in the Southeastern United States. Some sources say the species is invasive in the US, while others say that it is naturalized. People sometimes shape it into hedges for privacy screening. They are reported to attract moths, butterflies, bees, and hummingbirds, and may be used in butterfly gardens.

In the parts of East Asia where it is native, the leaves are sometimes eaten, similarly to wild or foraged vegetables. They are boiled to remove the odor.

The wood is used to make clogs. In some Japanese villages, a type of grub found in the trunk is toasted and fed to children to calm them.

The berries contain the novel pigment trichotomine, and can be used to make natural dyes.

== History ==
This species was first introduced into European cultivation around 1800. In the U.S. state of Arkansas, it was introduced from Japan by Russian botanist Karl Maximovich in the 1860s.

== Gallery ==
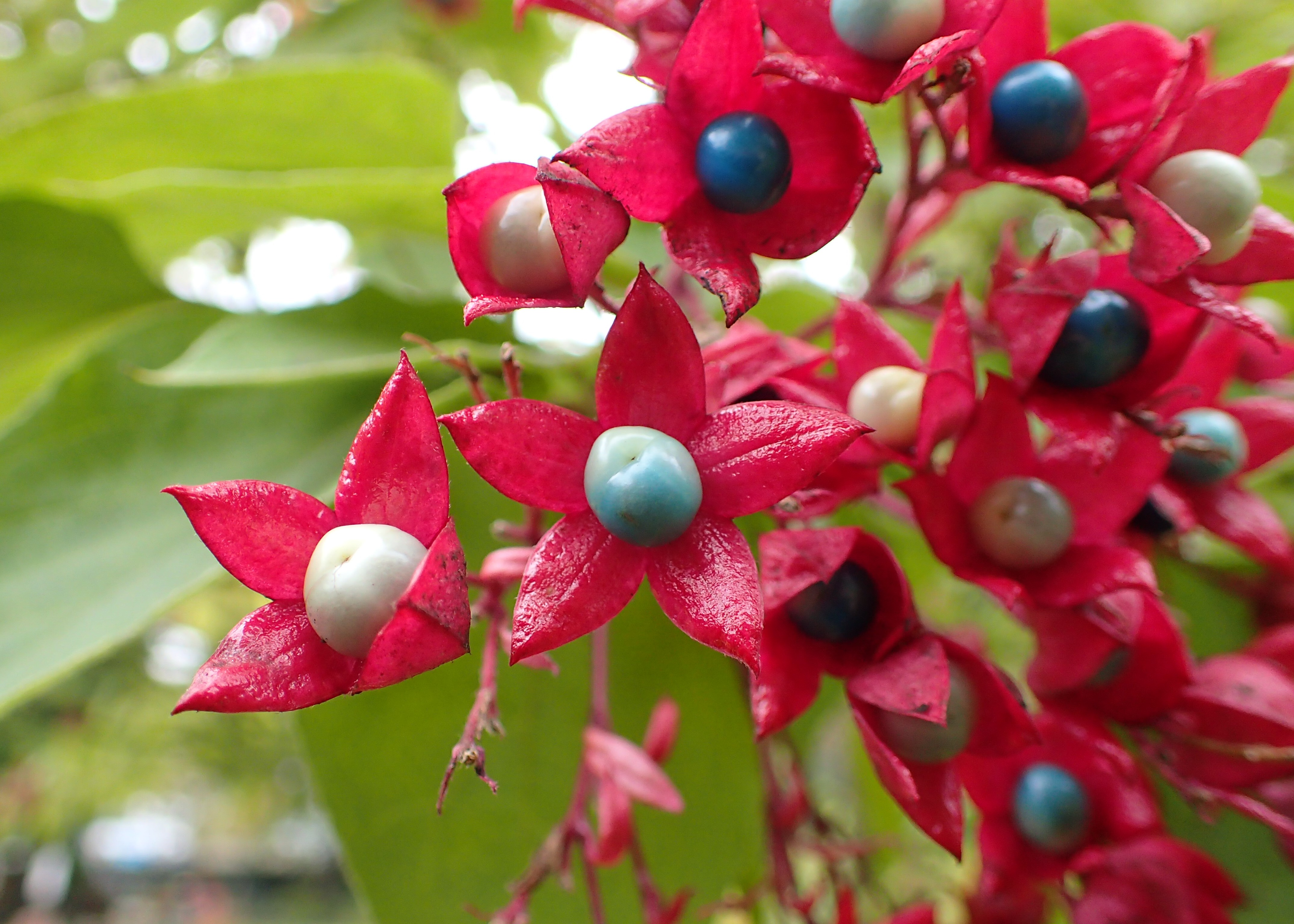
Berries in various states of maturation

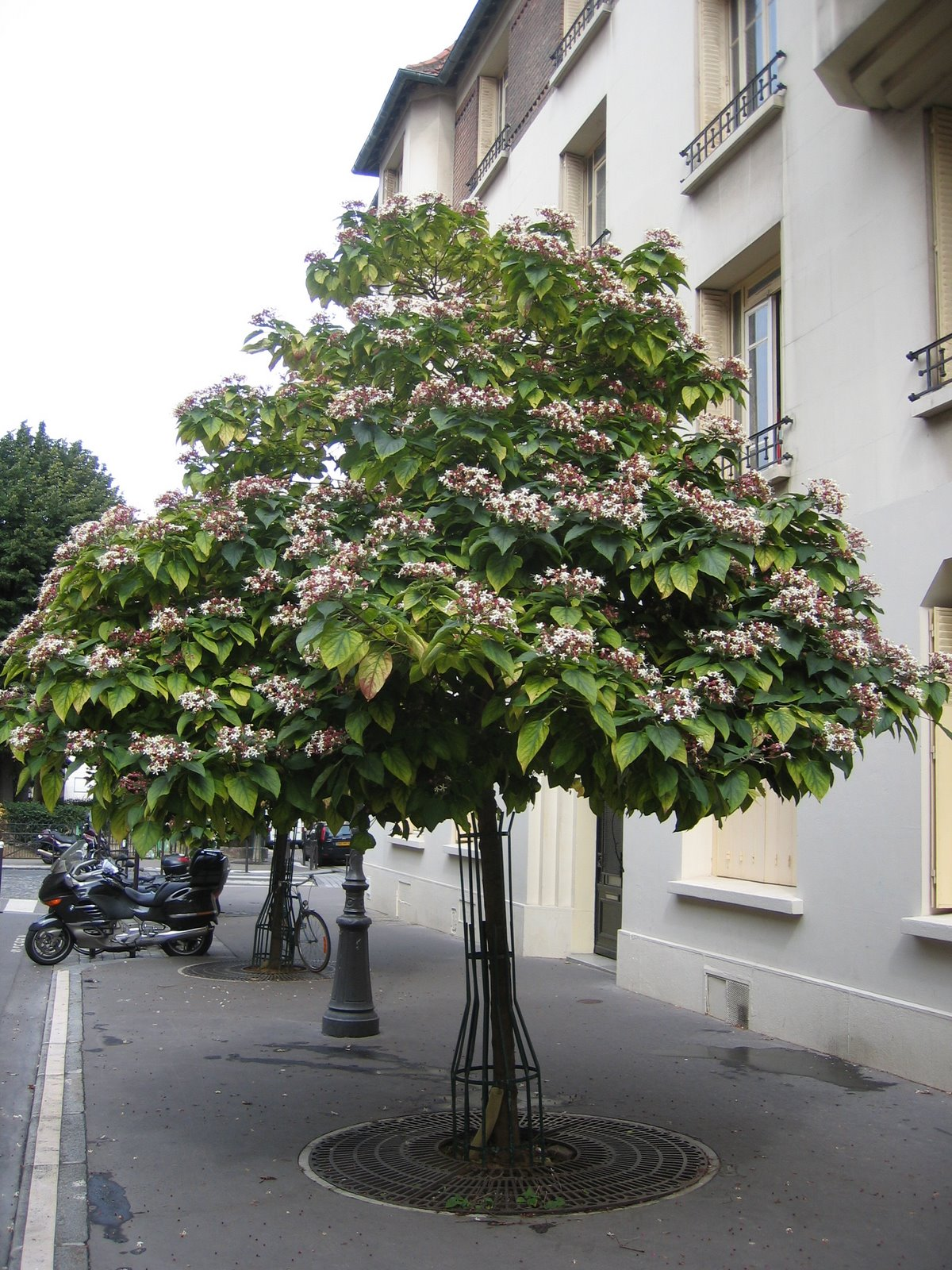
This Clerodendrum trichotomum plant has been shaped into a tree.

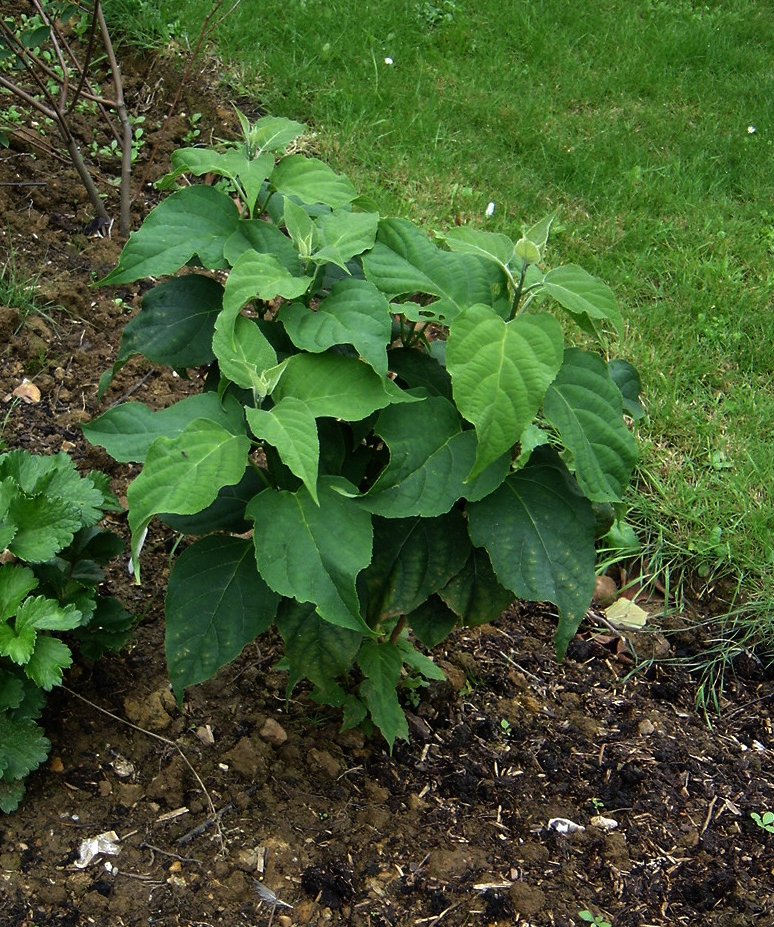
Young plant

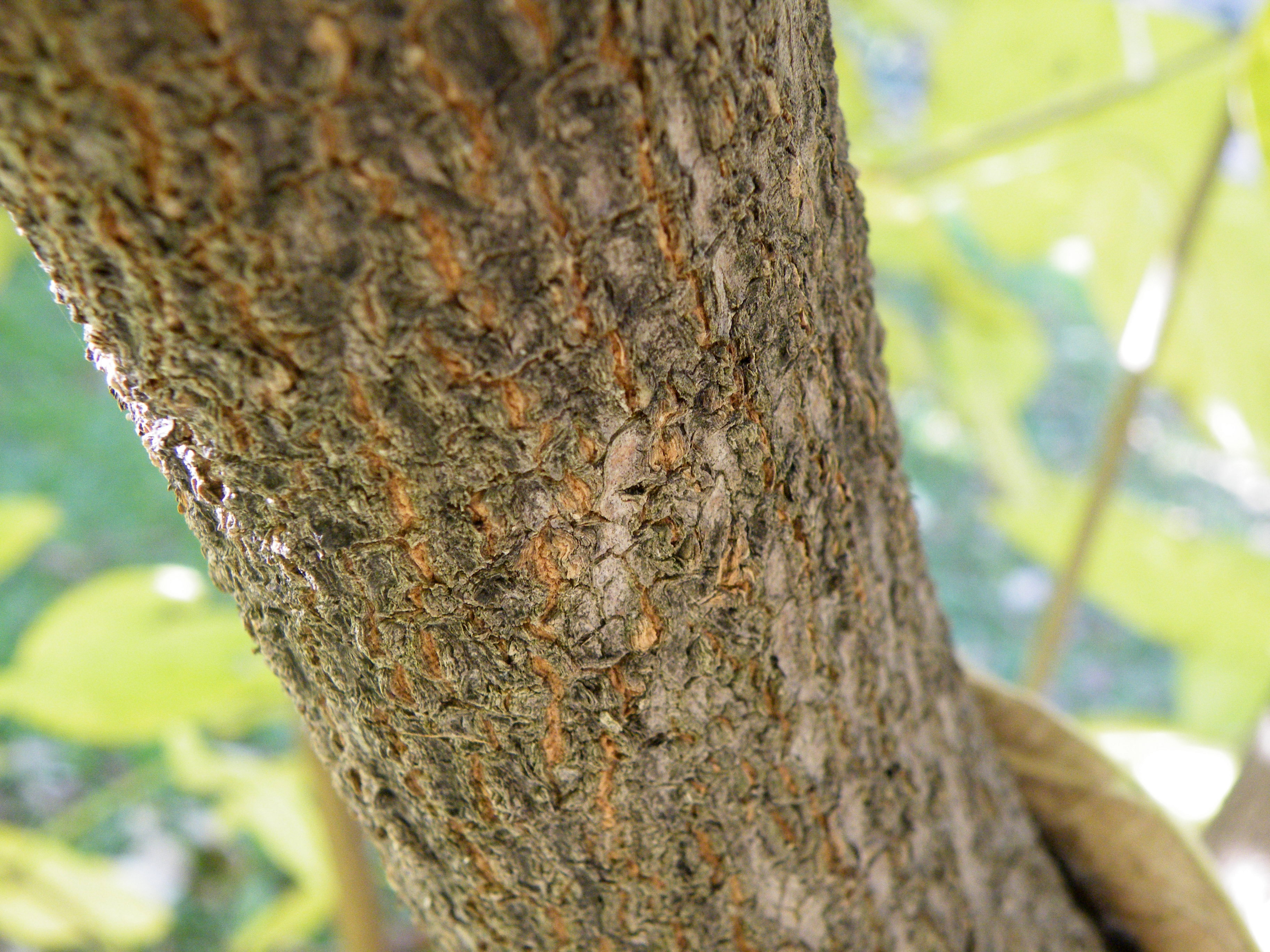
Bark

== See also ==
- Bunchosia argentea and Bunchosia glandulifera – also called "peanut butter fruit" or "peanut butter plant"
- Clerodendrum bungei – similar related species
- Dicentra formosa
- Euonymus alatus
- Iris foetidissima
- Magnolia
- Mimosa
- Peanut
- Phytolacca americana
- Pollia condensata
- Sumac
- Teak
- × Chitalpa
- Zygogonium ericetorum
