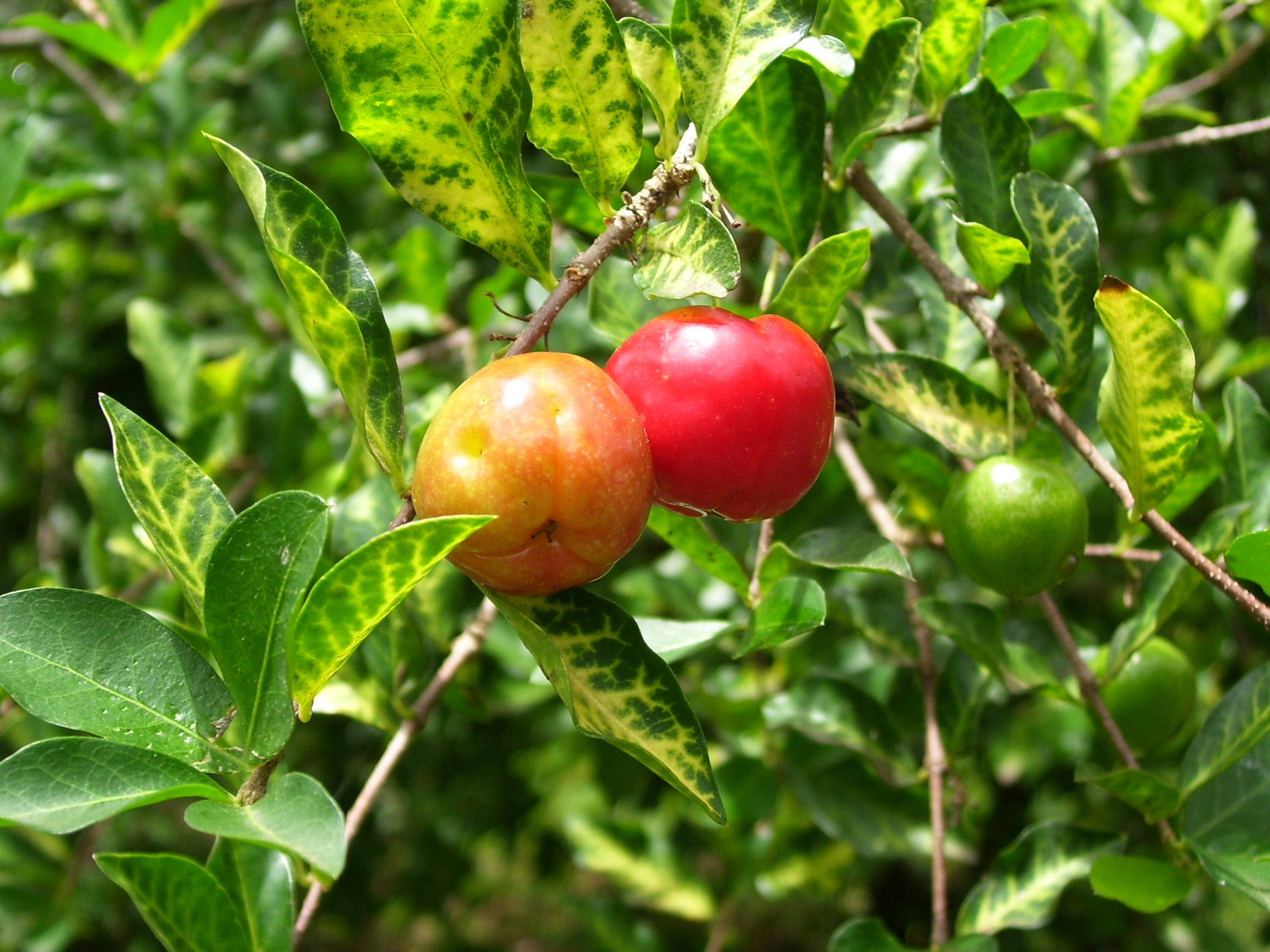
- Malpighia emarginata

Scientific classification
- Kingdom: Plantae
- Clade: Embryophytes
- Clade: Tracheophytes
- Clade: Angiosperms
- Clade: Eudicots
- Clade: Rosids
- Order: Malpighiales
- Family: Malpighiaceae
- Genus: Malpighia; L. (1753)

Type species
- Malpighia glabra L.

Species
- 108; see text

Synonyms
- Rudolphia Medik. (1787)

= Malpighia =

Genus of shrubs

Malpighia is a genus of flowering plants in the nance family, Malpighiaceae. It contains 108 species of shrubs or small trees, all of which are native to the American tropics, ranging from Texas through Mexico, Central America, and the Caribbean to Venezuela, Colombia, and Ecuador. The generic name honours Marcello Malpighi, a 17th-century Italian physician and botanist. The species grow to 1–6 m (3.3–19.7 ft) tall, with a dense, often thorny crown. The leaves are evergreen, simple, 0.5–15 cm (0.20–5.91 in) long, with an entire or serrated margin. The flowers are solitary or in umbels of two to several together, each flower 1–2 cm (0.39–0.79 in) diameter, with five white, pink, red, or purple petals. The fruit is a red, orange, or purple drupe, containing two or three hard seeds. M. emarginata, the acerola, is cultivated for its sweet and juicy fruits, which are very rich in vitamin C.

== Selected species ==
108 species are accepted. Selected species include:

- Malpighia aquifolia L.
- Malpighia cauliflora Proctor & Vivaldi (Jamaica)
- Malpighia coccigera L. – Singapore holly (Caribbean)
- Malpighia cubensis Kunth – palo bronco de hoja pequeña (Cuba)
- Malpighia emarginata DC. – Barbados cherry, acerola (southern Texas and Florida, Mexico, Central America, the Caribbean, northern South America.)
- Malpighia fucata Ker Gawl. (Puerto Rico)
- Malpighia glabra L.
- Malpighia harrisii Small (Jamaica)
- Malpighia mexicana A.Juss.
- Malpighia obtusifolia Proctor (Jamaica)
- Malpighia polytricha A.Juss.
- Malpighia proctorii Vivaldi (Jamaica)
- Malpighia setosa Spreng. – bristly stingingbush (The Bahamas, Hispaniola, Puerto Rico)
- Malpighia suberosa Small
- Malpighia urens L. – cowhage (Caribbean)
- Malpighia woodburyana – Woodbury's stingingbush (Caribbean)

=== Formerly placed here ===
- Bunchosia argentea (Jacq.) DC. (as M. argentea Jacq.)
- Bunchosia armeniaca (Cav.) DC. (as M. armeniaca Cav.
- Bunchosia glandulifera (Jacq.) Kunth (as M. glandulifera Jacq.)
- Bunchosia glandulosa (Cav.) DC. (as M. glandulosa Cav.)
- Byrsonima altissima (Aubl.) DC. (as M. altissima Aubl.)
- Byrsonima crassifolia (L.) Kunth (as M. crassifolia L.)
- Byrsonima densa (Poir.) DC. (as M. densa Poir.)
- Byrsonima spicata (Cav.) DC. (as M. spicata Cav.)
- Heteropterys multiflora (DC.) Hochr. (as M. reticulata Poir.)
