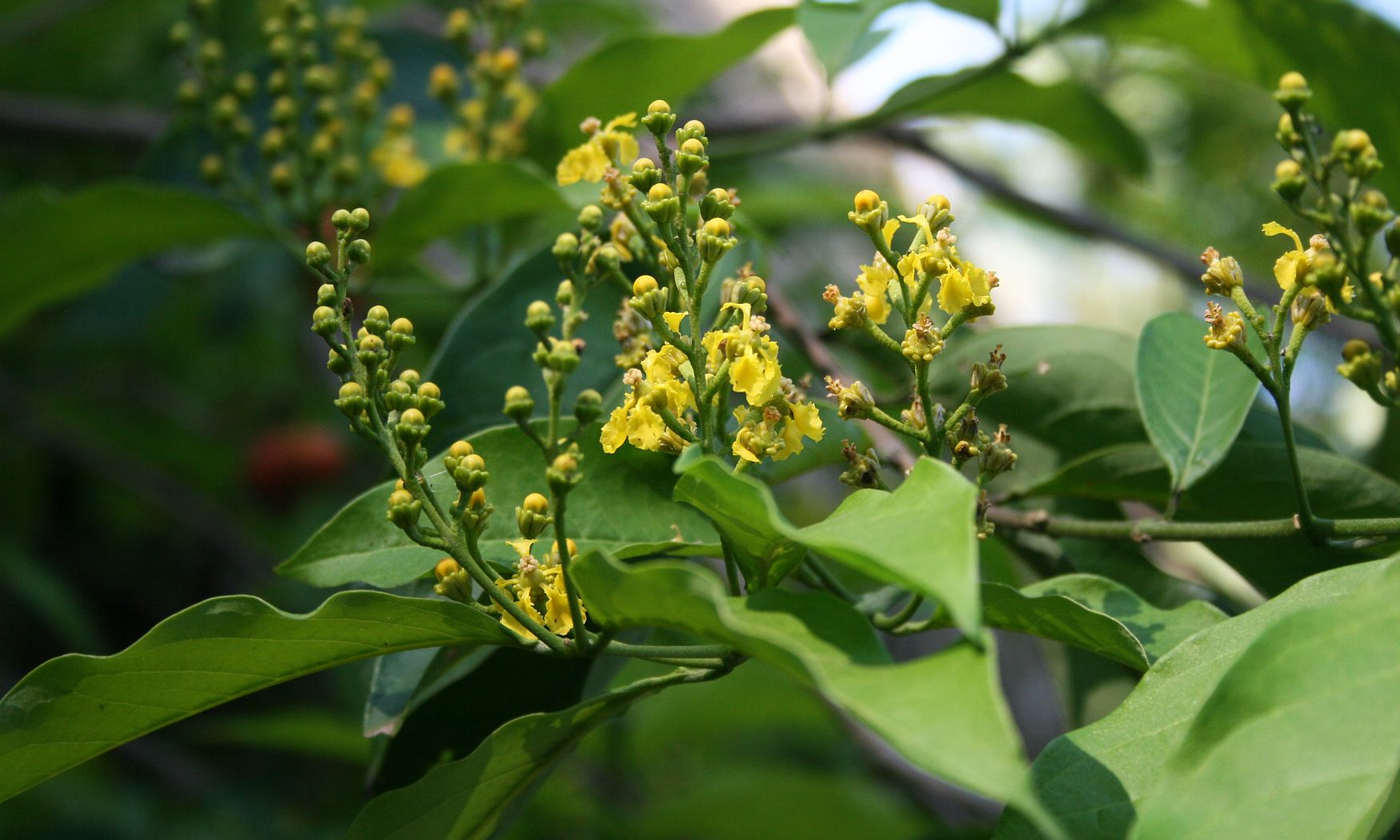
- Bunchosia nitida

Scientific classification
- Kingdom: Plantae
- Clade: Tracheophytes
- Clade: Angiosperms
- Clade: Eudicots
- Clade: Rosids
- Order: Malpighiales
- Family: Malpighiaceae
- Genus: Bunchosia; Rich. ex Kunth

Species
- ca. 92 species; see text

Synonyms
- Malacmaea Griseb.

= Bunchosia =

Genus of flowering plants

Bunchosia is a genus in the Malpighiaceae, a family of about 71 genera of flowering plants in the order Malpighiales. It currently (December 2025) contains 92 species of trees and shrubs, which are native to relatively dry woodlands, savannas, and wet forests. Their range extends from Mexico and the Caribbean to Peru, southern Brazil and northeast Argentina. Bunchosia is one of three arborescent genera of Malpighiaceae with fleshy, bird-dispersed fruits, the other two being Malpighia and Byrsonima.

== Etymology ==
Antoine Laurent De Jussieu explained the name of the genus as from the resemblance of the paired seeds, flat on one side and convex on the other, to coffee beans. He stated that the name was from one of the old Arabic words for coffee: bunchos. At least one species is said to have poisonous seeds.

== Selected species ==
- Bunchosia argentea (Jacq.) DC. – silver peanut butter fruit, marmelo, mountain plum (ciruela del monte). A wild species with leaves abaxially sericeous, giving a silvery appearance.
- Bunchosia armeniaca (Cav.) DC. – cansaboca, friar's plum (ciruela del fraile).
- Bunchosia biocellata Schltdl.
- Bunchosia cauliflora W.R.Anderson
- Bunchosia cornifolia Kunth
- Bunchosia costaricensis Rose
- Bunchosia fluminensis – cachita, muchita or cafezinho do mato. Flavour resembles corn and papaya.
- Bunchosia glandulifera (Jacq.) Kunth – peanut butter fruit. Most popular and widespread species in cultivation.
- Bunchosia glandulosa (Cav.) DC.
- Bunchosia hartwegiana Benth.
- Bunchosia hookeriana A.Juss.
- Bunchosia jamaicensis Urb. & Ndz.
- Bunchosia lindeniana A.Juss.
- Bunchosia linearifolia P.Wilson
- Bunchosia mcvaughii W.R.Anderson
- Bunchosia pallescens Skottsb. – usama or pale bunchosia.
- Bunchosia praecox W.R.Anderson
- Bunchosia sonorensis Rose
- Bunchosia tutensis Dobson

=== Formerly placed here ===
- Malpighia mexicana subsp. guadalajarensis (S.Watson) F.K.Mey. (as B. guadalajarensis S.Watson)
