= Bunchosia linearifolia =

Conservation status
- Vulnerable (IUCN 2.3)

Scientific classification
- Kingdom: Plantae
- Clade: Tracheophytes
- Clade: Angiosperms
- Clade: Eudicots
- Clade: Rosids
- Order: Malpighiales
- Family: Malpighiaceae
- Genus: Bunchosia
- Species: B. linearifolia

Binomial name
- Bunchosia linearifolia P. Wilson

Species of flowering plant

Bunchosia linearifolia is a species of plant in the Malpighiaceae family. It is endemic to Cuba.
