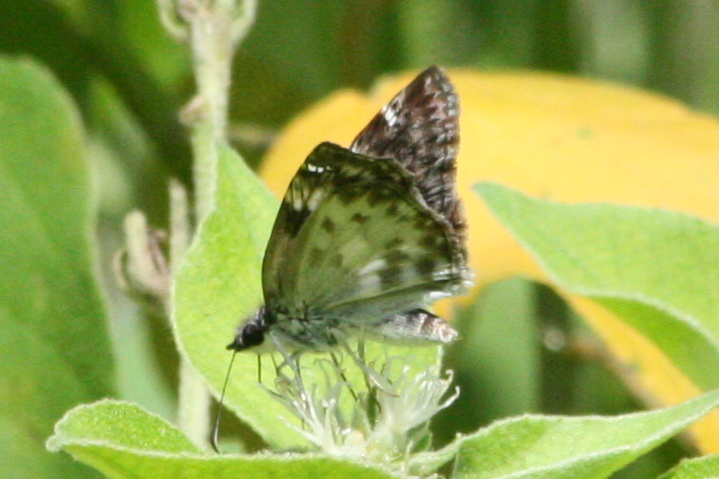

Scientific classification
- Kingdom: Animalia
- Phylum: Arthropoda
- Class: Insecta
- Order: Lepidoptera
- Family: Hesperiidae
- Genus: Chiothion
- Species: C. asychis

Binomial name
- Chiothion asychis (Stoll, [1780])

Synonyms
- List: Papilio asychis Stoll, [1780]; Ephyriades asychis; Hesperia asychis; Achlyodes asychis; Phythonides dilucida Möschler, 1877; Ephyriades palica Mabille, 1888; Pyrgus georgina Reakirt, 1868; Chiomara georgina; Chiomara asychis (Stoll, [1780])

= Chiothion asychis =

Species of butterfly

Chiothion asychis, the white-patched skipper or white patch, is a species of butterfly in the family Hesperiidae. It is found from Argentina, north through tropical America to the West Indies and southern Texas. Strays can be found as far north as southern Arizona, Nevada and Kansas.

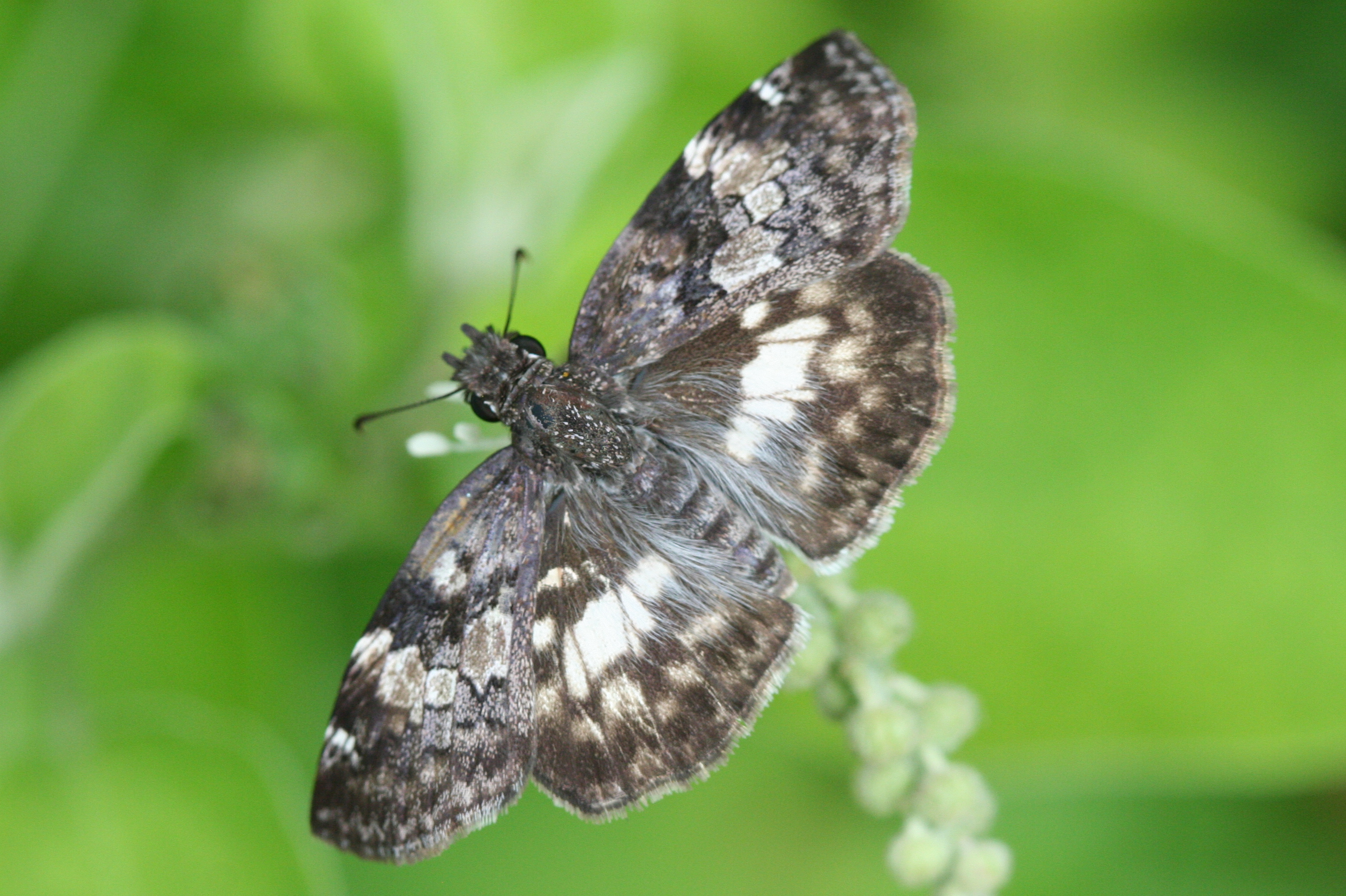

The wingspan is 29–38 mm. Three to four generations occur, with adults on wing throughout the year in southern Texas.

The larvae feed on Malpighia glabra in Texas and on Gaudichaudia pentandra in Mexico. Adults feed on flower nectar.

== Subspecies ==
- Chiothion asychis asychis - Surinam
- Chiothion asychis autander - Argentina
- Chiothion asychis georgina - Mexico
- Chiothion asychis grenada - Grenada
- Chiothion asychis pelagica - Mexico - Baja California Sur
- Chiothion asychis simon - Colombia
- Chiothion asychis vincenta - St. Vincent
- Chiothion asychis zania - Peru
