= Bunchosia hartwegiana =

Conservation status
- Least Concern (IUCN 3.1)

Scientific classification
- Kingdom: Plantae
- Clade: Tracheophytes
- Clade: Angiosperms
- Clade: Eudicots
- Clade: Rosids
- Order: Malpighiales
- Family: Malpighiaceae
- Genus: Bunchosia
- Species: B. hartwegiana

Binomial name
- Bunchosia hartwegiana Benth.

Species of plant

Bunchosia hartwegiana is a species of plant in the Malpighiaceae family. It is found in Colombia and Panama.
