= Brilliant blue FCF =

Common food coloring

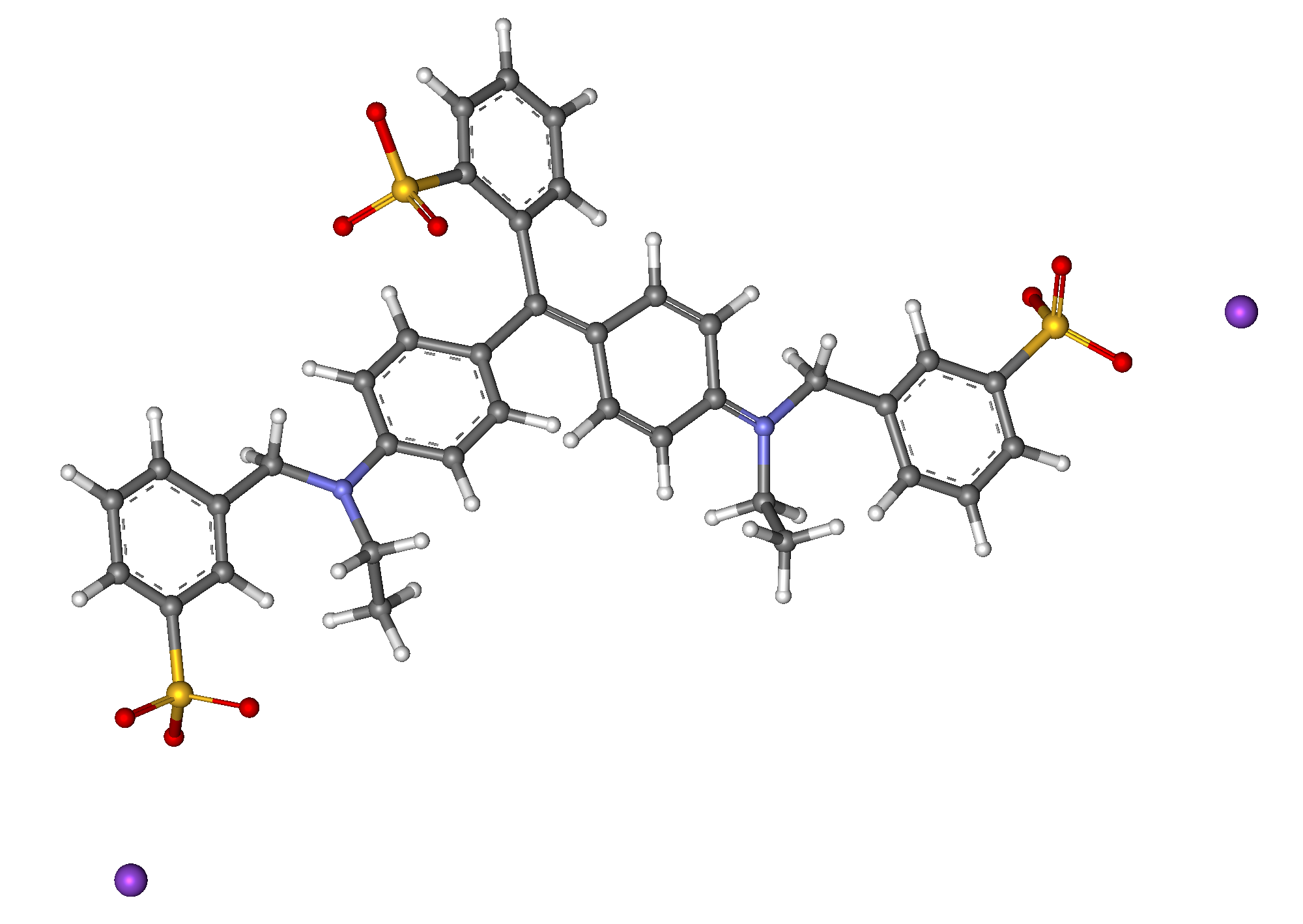

Names
- IUPAC name disodium;2-[[4-[ethyl-[(3-sulfonatophenyl)methyl]amino]phenyl]-[4-[ethyl-[(3-sulfonatophenyl)methyl]azaniumylidene]cyclohexa-2,5-dien-1-ylidene]methyl]benzenesulfonate
- Other names: FD&C Blue No.1; Acid blue 9; D&C Blue No. 4; Atracid Blue FG; Acilan Turquoise Blue AE; Aizen Brilliant Blue FCF; Alzen Food Blue No. 1; Erioglaucine; Eriosky blue; Patent Blue AR; Xylene Blue VSG; C.I. 42090; CI Food Blue 2; Basacid Blue 755; Sulfacid Brilliant Blue 5 J; Neolan Blue E-A; Brilliant Blue FD; Brilliant Blue Lake; Blue #1 Lake; Bucacid Azure Blue

Identifiers
CAS Number	3844-45-9; 2650-18-2 (ammonium)
3D model (JSmol)	Interactive image
ChEBI	CHEBI:82411
ChEMBL	ChEMBL3184128
ChemSpider	18556
ECHA InfoCard	100.021.219
EC Number	223-339-8
E number	E133 (colours)
KEGG	C19352
PubChem CID	19700
UNII	H3R47K3TBD
CompTox Dashboard (EPA)	DTXSID2020189
- InChI: InChI=1S/C37H36N2O9S3.2Na/c1-3-38(25-27-9-7-11-33(23-27)49(40,41)42)31-19-15-29(16-20-31)37(35-13-5-6-14-36(35)51(46,47)48)30-17-21-32(22-18-30)39(4-2)26-28-10-8-12-34(24-28)50(43,44)45;;/h5-24H,3-4,25-26H2,1-2H3,(H2-,40,41,42,43,44,45,46,47,48);;/q;2*+1/p-2 Key: SGHZXLIDFTYFHQ-UHFFFAOYSA-L; InChI=1/C37H36N2O9S3.2Na/c1-3-38(25-27-9-7-11-33(23-27)49(40,41)42)31-19-15-29(16-20-31)37(35-13-5-6-14-36(35)51(46,47)48)30-17-21-32(22-18-30)39(4-2)26-28-10-8-12-34(24-28)50(43,44)45;;/h5-24H,3-4,25-26H2,1-2H3,(H2-,40,41,42,43,44,45,46,47,48);;/q;2*+1/p-2 Key: SGHZXLIDFTYFHQ-NUQVWONBAU
- SMILES: CCN(CC1=CC(=CC=C1)S(=O)(=O)[O-])C2=CC=C(C=C2)C(=C3C=CC(=[N+](CC)CC4=CC(=CC=C4)S(=O)(=O)[O-])C=C3)C5=CC=CC=C5S(=O)(=O)[O-].[Na+].[Na+]

Properties
Chemical formula	C_{37}H_{34}N_{2}Na_{2}O_{9}S_{3}
Molar mass	792.85 g/mol
Melting point	283 °C (decomposes)
Solubility in water	soluble

Hazards
NFPA 704 (fire diamond)	2 1 0
- Except where otherwise noted, data are given for materials in their standard state (at 25 °C [77 °F], 100 kPa). verify (what is ?) Infobox references

Brilliant blue FCF (Blue 1) is a synthetic organic compound used primarily as a blue colorant for processed foods, medications, dietary supplements, and cosmetics. It is classified as a triarylmethane dye and is known under various names, such as FD&C Blue No. 1 or acid blue 9. It is denoted by E number E133 and has a color index of 42090. It has the appearance of a blue powder and is soluble in water and glycerol, with a maximum absorption at about 628 nanometers. It is one of the oldest FDA-approved color additives, having been permanently listed for use in food and ingested drugs in 1969. It is generally considered nontoxic and safe for consumption.

== Production ==
Brilliant blue FCF is a synthetic dye produced by the condensation of 2-formylbenzenesulfonic acid and the appropriate aniline followed by oxidation. It can be combined with tartrazine (E102) to produce various shades of green.

It is usually a disodium salt. The diammonium salt has CAS number 2650-18-2. Calcium and potassium salts are also permitted. It can also appear as an aluminium lake. The chemical formula is C_{37}H_{34}N_{2}Na_{2}O_{9}S_{3}.

Related dyes are C.I. acid green 3 (CAS#4680-78-8) and acid green 9 (CAS#4857-81-2). In these dyes, the 2-sulfonic acid group is replaced by H and Cl, respectively.

Many attempts have been made to find similarly colored natural dyes that are as stable as brilliant blue FCF. Blue pigments must possess many chemical traits, including pi-bond conjugation, aromatic rings, heteroatoms and heteroatom groups, and ionic charges in order to absorb low energy red light. Most natural blue dyes are either unstable, blue only in alkaline conditions, or toxic; good candidates for further research into use as natural dyes include anthocyanin, trichotomine, and phycocyanin derivatives.

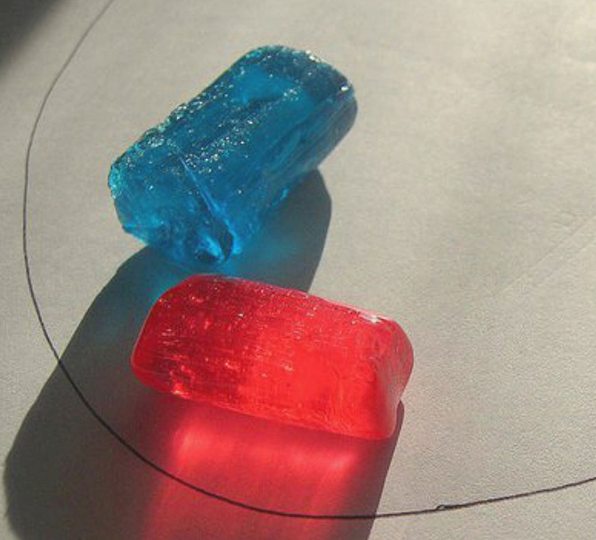
Blue and red Jolly Rancher candy. The blue color is brilliant blue FCF dye.

== Applications ==
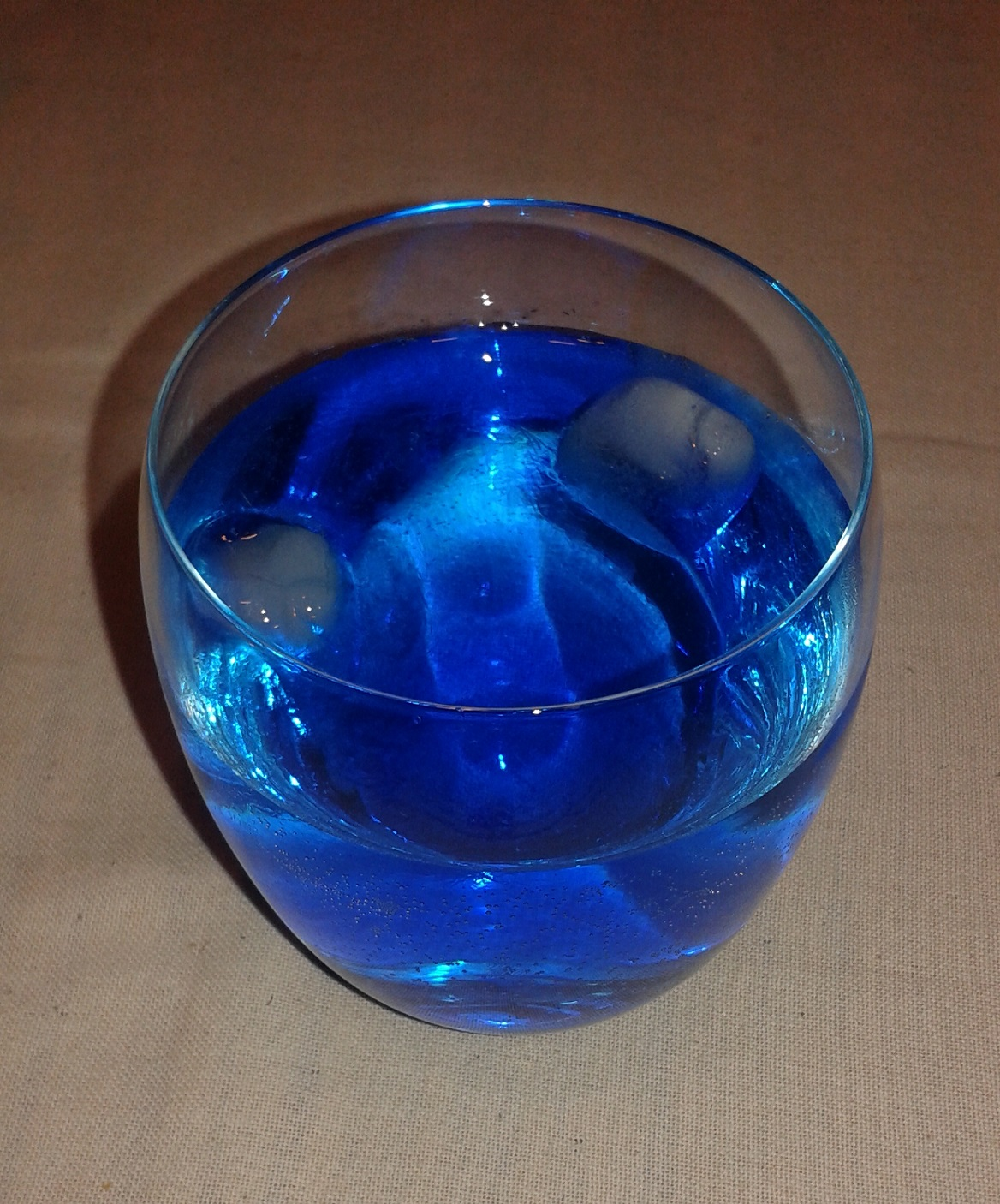
Vodka with Blue Curaçao syrup

Like many other color additives, the primary use of Blue No. 1 is to correct or enhance natural coloring or to give colorless compounds a vivid hue.

In the United States, of the two approved blue food dyes (the other being Indigo carmine, or FD&C Blue #2), brilliant blue FCF is the more common of the two. As a blue color, brilliant blue FCF is often found in cotton candy, ice cream, canned processed peas, packet soups, bottled food colorings, icings, ice pops, blueberry flavored products, children's medications, dairy products, sweets, soft drinks, and drinks, especially the liqueur Blue Curaçao. It is also used in soaps, shampoos, mouthwash and other hygiene and cosmetics applications.

Brilliant blue FCF is extensively used as a water tracer agent. Due to its ability to retain color for long periods of time, brilliant blue FCF outperforms other dye tracers. Additionally, brilliant blue FCF has a low toxicity level that is favorable for the environment. However, brilliant blue FCF has different impacts on varying soils. Brilliant blue FCF is attracted to and sorbed in acidic soils due to its large size and ionic charge. Soil composition and flow velocity also affect the level of sorption of brilliant blue FCF.

Brilliant blue FCF dye within beverages items—such as soda—can be used in the blue bottle experiment. In such foods, both the dye and reducing agents are incorporated in the same solution. When the solution is blue, oxygen is present. On the addition of NaOH, a reaction occurs that removes the oxygen, turning the solution clear. The dye turns back to blue once it is reoxidized by swirling the solution, incorporating oxygen from the air as an oxidizing agent.

== History ==
Brilliant Blue FCF was first synthesized in the early 20th century as part of the development of synthetic dyes derived from coal tar and aniline compounds. It gained regulatory prominence in the United States when it was among the first synthetic colorants certified for food use under the Federal Food, Drug, and Cosmetic Act of 1938. In 1969, following a safety review prompted by concerns over certain synthetic colorants, Brilliant Blue FCF was one of the few dyes permanently approved by the U.S. Food and Drug Administration for use in food, drugs, and cosmetics. Its vivid hue, water solubility, chemical stability, and low toxicity contributed to its widespread use. Despite ongoing interest in natural blue alternatives, Brilliant Blue FCF continues to be widely used in commercial products.

== Health and safety ==
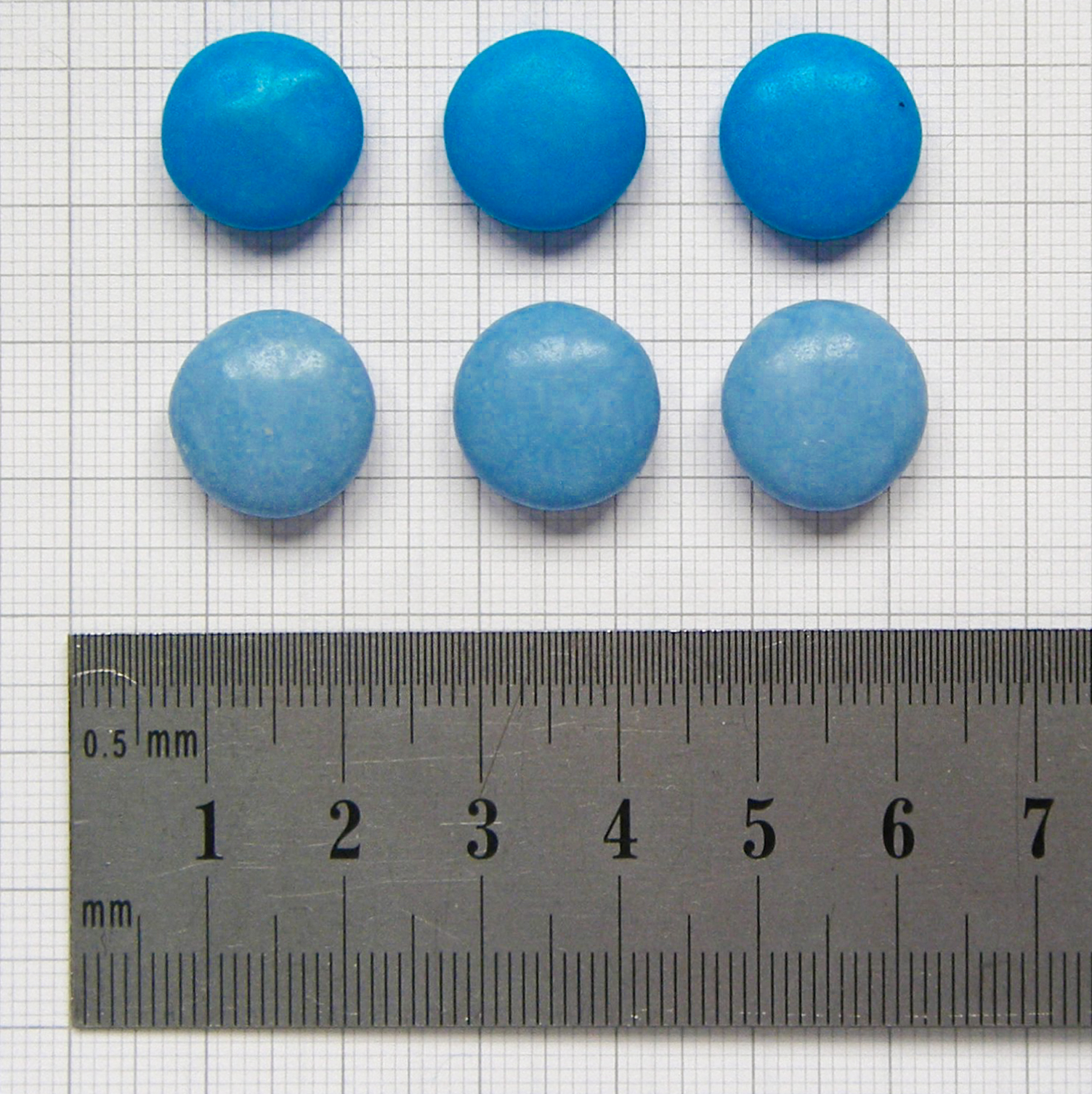
In the United Kingdom, Smarties chocolates were colored with brilliant blue FCF (top) until 2008, later being replaced with a natural spirulina coloring (bottom).

When applied to the tongue or to shaven skin, brilliant blue FCF can be absorbed directly into the bloodstream. However, in experiments with rodents, it was found that it is poorly absorbed from the gastrointestinal tract, and 95% of the ingested dye can be found in the feces.

Due to its nontoxic properties, brilliant blue FCF has been used as a biological stain. When dissolved in an acidic medium, this dye has been used to stain cell walls, bacteria, and fungal cells. The dye does not inhibit the growth of any of these species.

For similar reasons, brilliant blue FCF is also being utilized in hemostatic medical devices, most notably the Hemopatch—designed to be placed on bleeding tissues and coagulate the blood. A low concentration of brilliant blue FCF is placed on the backside of the Hemopatch at 1 cm increments, allowing surgeons to cut precisely and indicate the side of the Hemopatch that is an active hemostatic agent for correct placement.

Brilliant blue FCF is an approved food colorant and pharmacologically inactive substance for drug formulations in the EU and the United States. It is also legal in other countries. In a 1979 clinical trial of patients with perennial asthma, brilliant blue FCF, tested alongside two other non-azobenzene dyes (Erythrosine & Indigotin), was found to have no effect on pulmonary function in 42 of 43 participants. This indicates that brilliant blue FCF is highly unlikely to cause allergic reactions in individuals with pre-existing moderate asthma. But, a case study of a 55-year-old man in 1996 reporting occupational asthma when exposed to Indigotine (a derivative of Indigotin) at work found reduced pulmonary function could be recapitulated under laboratory conditions upon exposure; suggesting that there may be some people sensitive to non-azobenzene dyes or just Indigotin particularly. In 2003, the U.S. FDA issued a public health advisory to warn health care providers of the potential toxicity of this synthetic dye in enteral feeding solutions. The following legal limits apply in the EU (E 133) and other countries: 150–300 mg/kg depending on the type of food. Safety limit for foods and drugs: 0.1 mg/day per kg body weight. The acceptable daily intake for brilliant blue FCF is 6 mg/kg.

== See also ==
- Blue pigments
- Trichotomine
