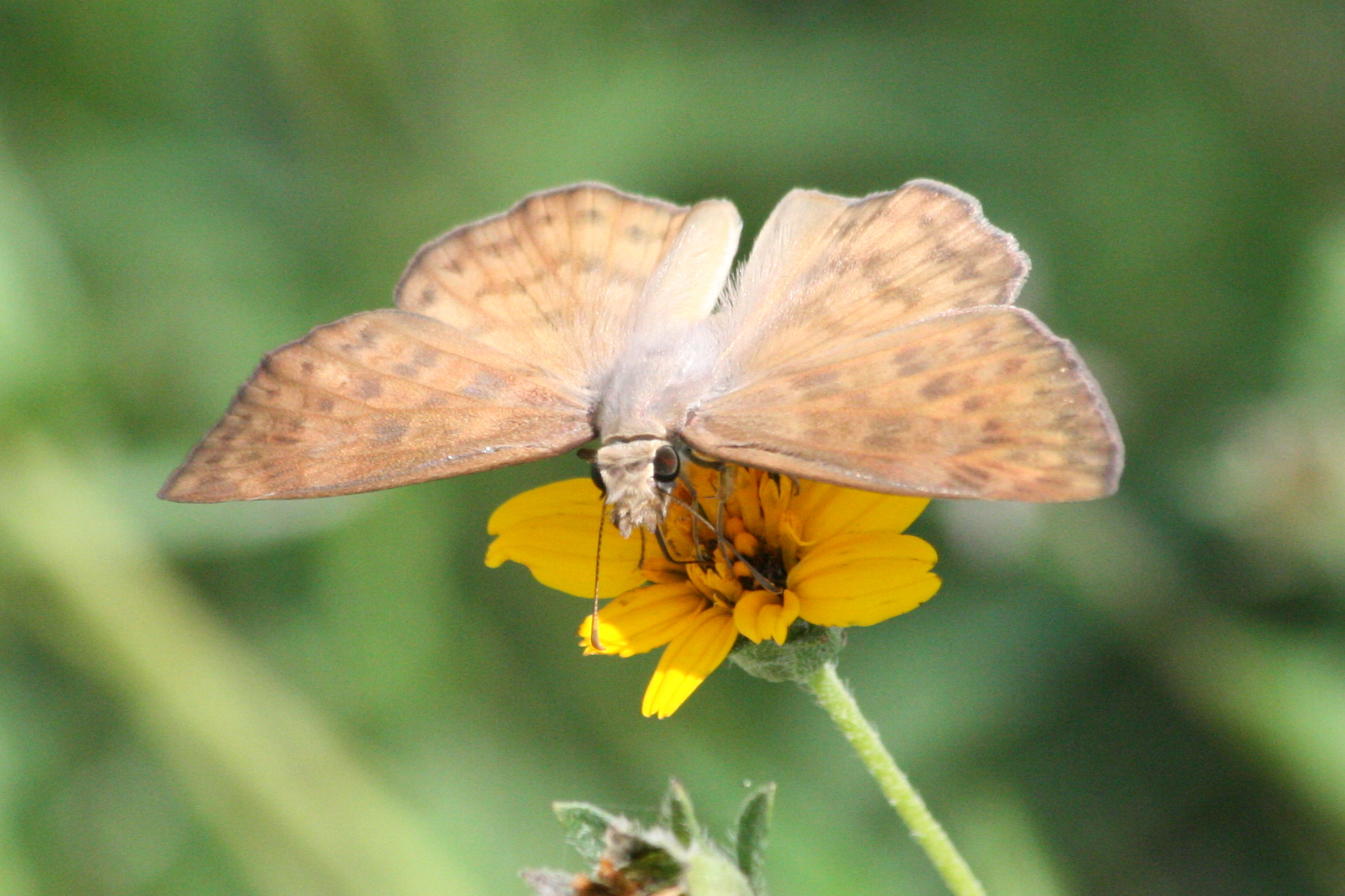

Scientific classification
- Domain: Eukaryota
- Kingdom: Animalia
- Phylum: Arthropoda
- Class: Insecta
- Order: Lepidoptera
- Family: Hesperiidae
- Genus: Timochares
- Species: T. ruptifasciatus

Binomial name
- Timochares ruptifasciatus (Plötz, 1884)

Synonyms
- Antigonus ruptifasciatus Plötz, 1884; Timochares trifasciatus f. obscurior Draudt, 1923

= Timochares ruptifasciatus =

Species of butterfly

Timochares ruptifasciatus, the brown-banded skipper, is a butterfly of the family Hesperiidae. It is found in southern Texas, Mexico and Jamaica.

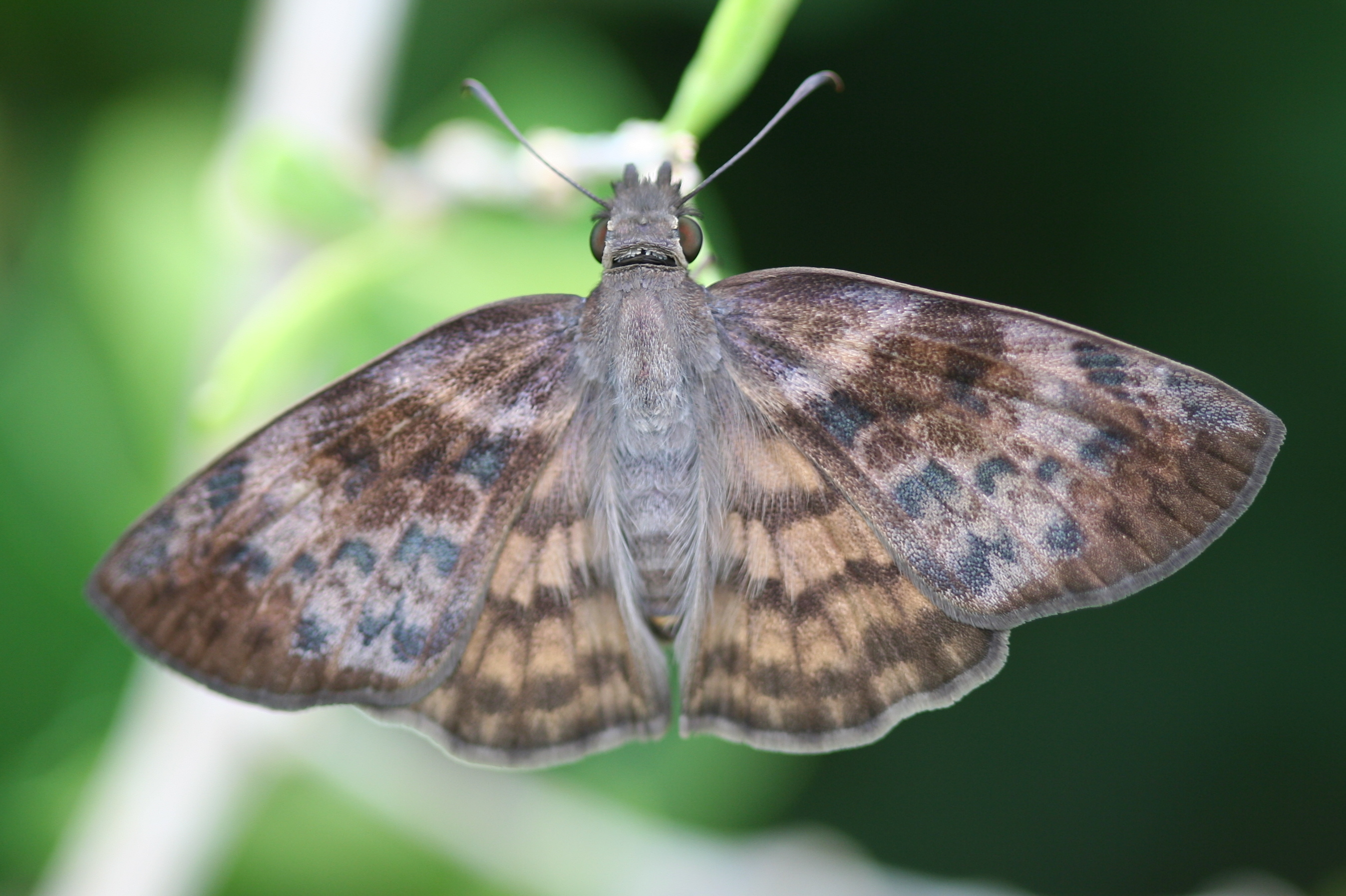

The wingspan is 38–43 millimetres (1.5–1.7 in). There are several generation with adults on wing from March to November in southern Texas and Mexico.

The larvae feed on Malpighia glabra. Adults feed on flower nectar.
