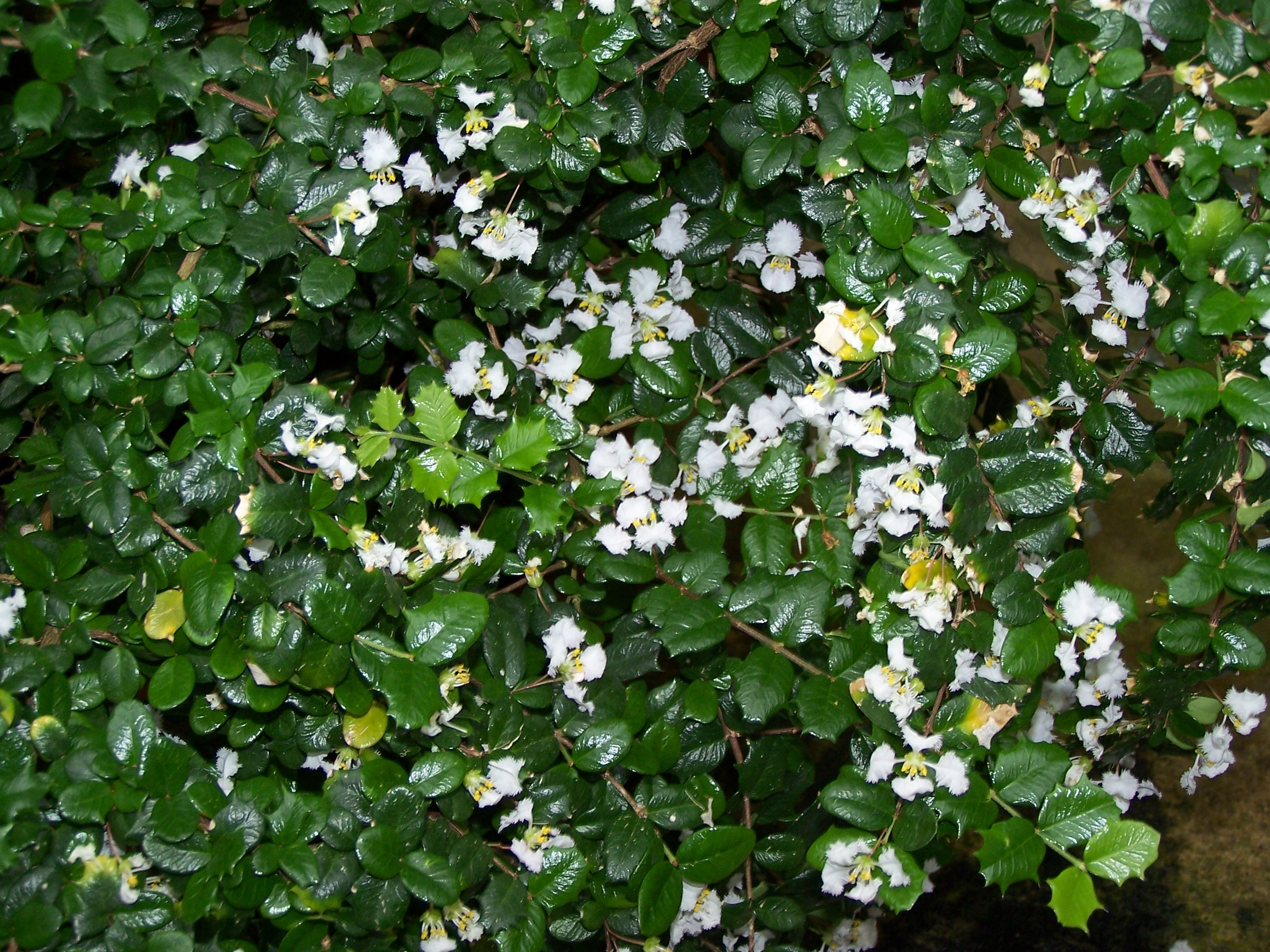

Scientific classification
- Kingdom: Plantae
- Clade: Tracheophytes
- Clade: Angiosperms
- Clade: Eudicots
- Clade: Rosids
- Order: Malpighiales
- Family: Malpighiaceae
- Genus: Malpighia
- Species: M. coccigera

Binomial name
- Malpighia coccigera L.

= Malpighia coccigera =

Species of flowering plant

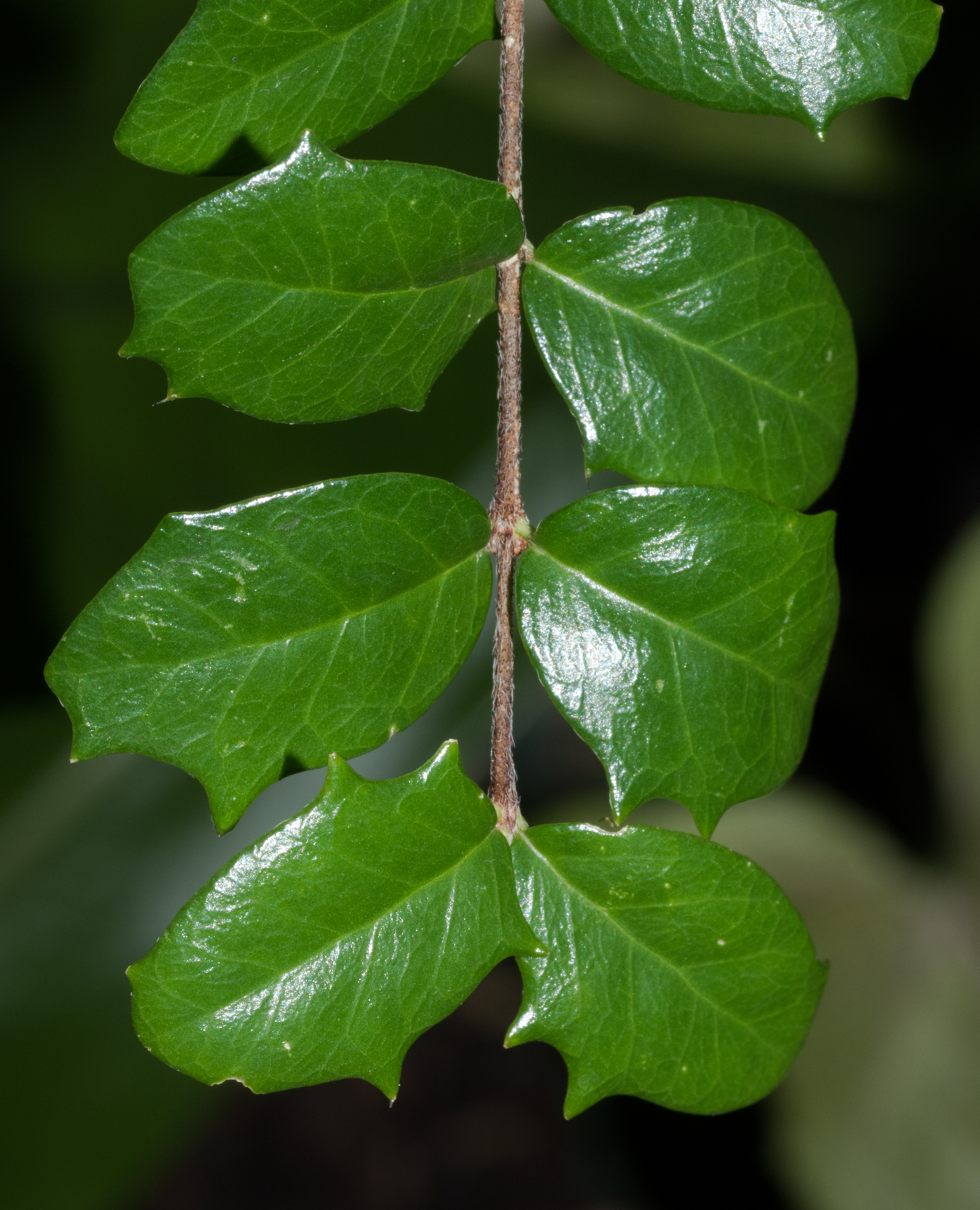
Leaves of M. coccigera

Malpighia coccigera is a species of flowering plant in the family Malpighiaceae, that is native to the Caribbean. It is commonly known as Singapore holly or dwarf holly due to the shape of its leaves, despite it not being a true holly (genus Ilex).

== Description ==
Its white flowers are followed by red berries, which are technically drupes. The fruit are favorite by birds that disperse the seeds through droppings. It is grown as an ornamental plant and often used to make bonsai.
