= Malpighia obtusifolia =

Conservation status
- Vulnerable (IUCN 2.3)

Scientific classification
- Kingdom: Plantae
- Clade: Tracheophytes
- Clade: Angiosperms
- Clade: Eudicots
- Clade: Rosids
- Order: Malpighiales
- Family: Malpighiaceae
- Genus: Malpighia
- Species: M. obtusifolia

Binomial name
- Malpighia obtusifolia Proctor

Species of flowering plant

Malpighia obtusifolia is a species of plant in the family Malpighiaceae. It is endemic to Jamaica.
