= Mamey =

Mamey may refer to:

== Plants and fruits ==
- Bunchosia armeniaca, "cold-earth mamey", in the family Malpighiaceae
- Magnolia guatemalensis, in the family Magnoliaceae, known as "mamey"
- Mammea americana, "yellow mamey", in the family Calophyllaceae
- Pouteria sapota, "red mamey", in the family Sapotaceae

== Geography ==
- Mamey, Aguada, Puerto Rico, a barrio
- Mamey, Guaynabo, Puerto Rico, a barrio
- Mamey, Gurabo, Puerto Rico, a barrio
- Mamey, Juncos, Puerto Rico, a barrio
- Mamey, Patillas, Puerto Rico, a barrio
- Mamey, Meurthe-et-Moselle, France

== See also ==
- El Mamey Formation, a geologic formation in the Dominican Republic
- Mameyes, a community within the limits of barrio Portugués Urbano, Puerto Rico
  - Mameyes Landslide, a disaster in the Puerto Rico community
