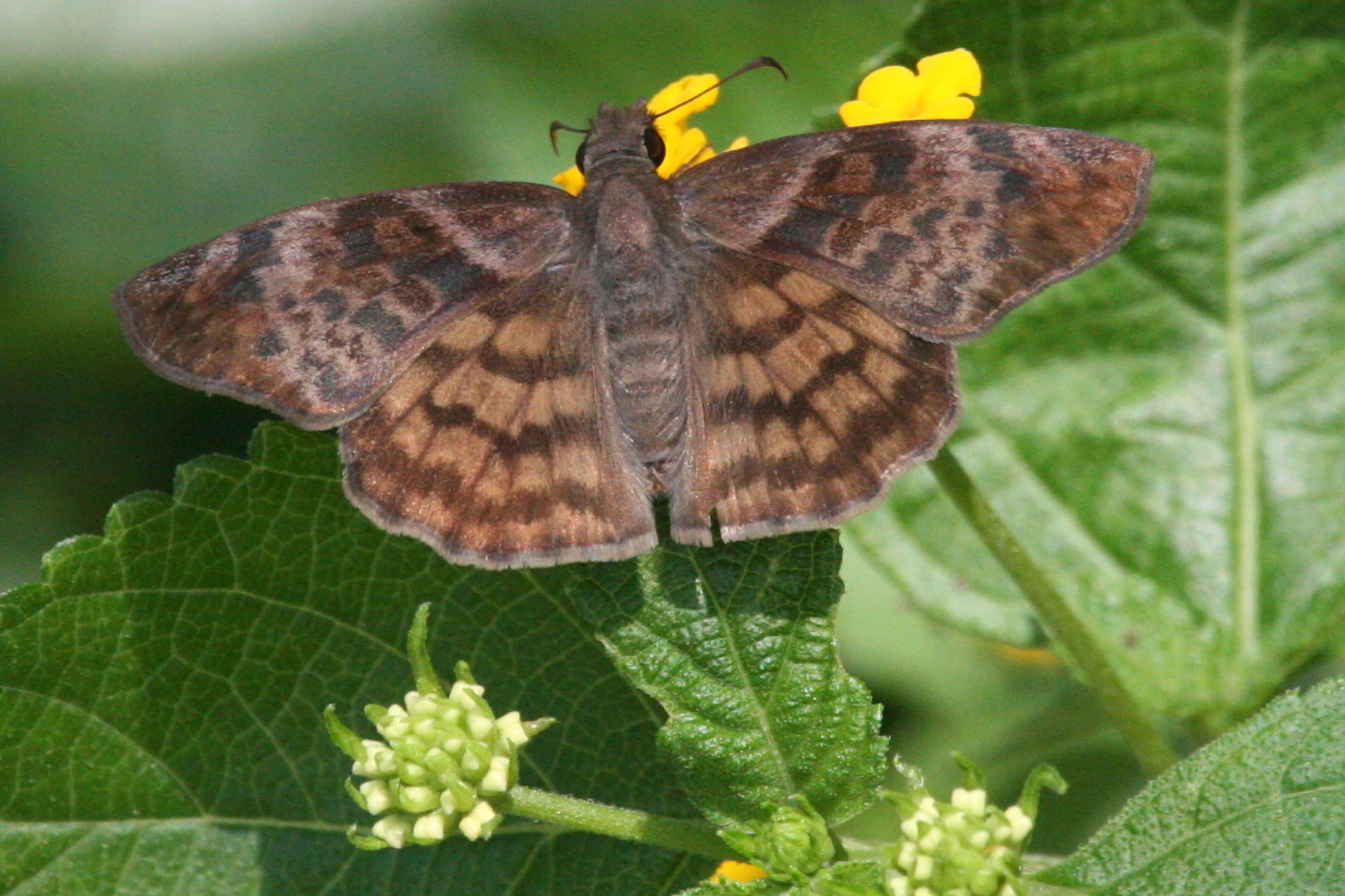
- Timochares ruptifasciata

Scientific classification
- Kingdom: Animalia
- Phylum: Arthropoda
- Clade: Pancrustacea
- Class: Insecta
- Order: Lepidoptera
- Family: Hesperiidae
- Tribe: Erynnini
- Genus: Timochares; Godman & Salvin, [1896]

= Timochares =

Genus of butterflies

Timochares is a genus of skippers in the family Hesperiidae.

== Species ==
- Timochares runia Evans, 1953
- Timochares ruptifasciatus (Plötz, 1884)
- Timochares trifasciata (Hewitson, 1868)
