= Bunchosia tutensis =

Conservation status
- Data Deficient (IUCN 2.3)

Scientific classification
- Kingdom: Plantae
- Clade: Tracheophytes
- Clade: Angiosperms
- Clade: Eudicots
- Clade: Rosids
- Order: Malpighiales
- Family: Malpighiaceae
- Genus: Bunchosia
- Species: B. tutensis

Binomial name
- Bunchosia tutensis Dobson

Species of flowering plant

Bunchosia tutensis is a species of plant in the Malpighiaceae family. It is endemic to Panama.
