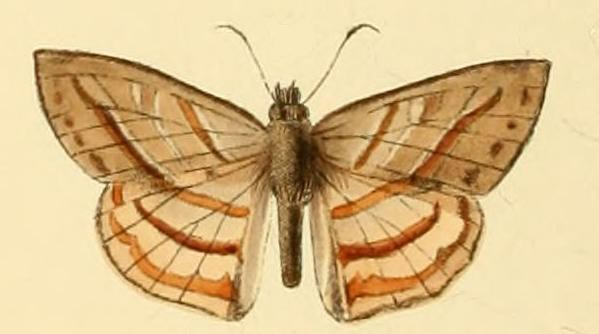

Scientific classification
- Kingdom: Animalia
- Phylum: Arthropoda
- Class: Insecta
- Order: Lepidoptera
- Family: Hesperiidae
- Genus: Timochares
- Species: T. trifasciata

Binomial name
- Timochares trifasciata (Hewitson, 1868)

Synonyms
- Leucochitonea trifasciata Hewitson, 1868; Antigonus trifasciatus; Nisoniades hemula Herrich-Schäffer; Nisoniades hemula Godman & Salvin, [1896]

= Timochares trifasciata =

Species of butterfly

Timochares trifasciata, the many-banded skipper, is a butterfly in the family Hesperiidae. It is found from eastern and western Mexico to southern Brazil, Paraguay and Argentina.

== Subspecies ==
- Timochares trifasciata trifasciata (Mexico to Paraguay and Brazil)
- Timochares trifasciata sanda Evans, 1953 (Argentina)
