= Trichotomine =

Blue organic pigment

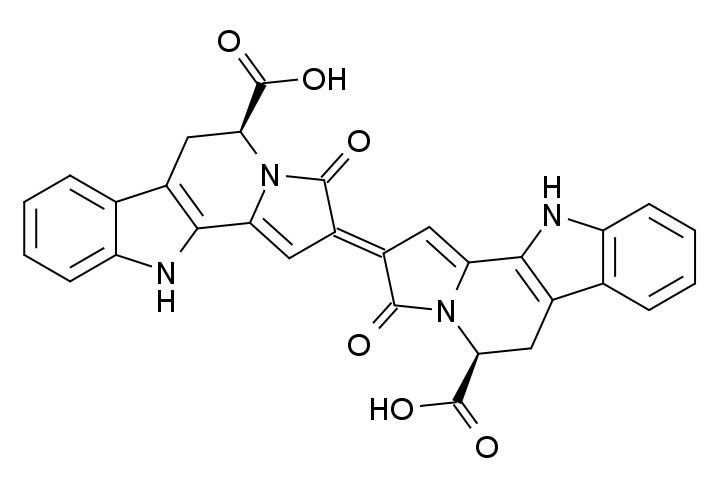

Names
- IUPAC name (2E,5S)-2-[(5S)-5-carboxy-3-oxo-6,11-dihydro-5H-indolizino[8,7-b]indol-2-ylidene]-3-oxo-6,11-dihydro-5H-indolizino[8,7-b]indole-5-carboxylic acid

Identifiers
CAS Number	53472-14-3; 122171-02-2 (non-specific)
3D model (JSmol)	Interactive image; Interactive image
ChemSpider	4444761
PubChem CID	5281412; 442120
UNII	52GDN97EHY
CompTox Dashboard (EPA)	DTXSID00415115
- InChI: InChI=1S/C30H20N4O6/c35-27-17(11-21-25-15(9-23(29(37)38)33(21)27)13-5-1-3-7-19(13)31-25)18-12-22-26-16(14-6-2-4-8-20(14)32-26)10-24(30(39)40)34(22)28(18)36/h1-8,11-12,23-24,31-32H,9-10H2,(H,37,38)(H,39,40)/b18-17+/t23-,24-/m0/s1 Key: LOHPAPKRMNSIDN-GKIAHDCUSA-N; InChI=1S/C30H20N4O6/c35-27-17(11-21-25-15(9-23(29(37)38)33(21)27)13-5-1-3-7-19(13)31-25)18-12-22-26-16(14-6-2-4-8-20(14)32-26)10-24(30(39)40)34(22)28(18)36/h1-8,11-12,23-24,31,35H,9-10H2,(H,37,38)(H,39,40)/t23-,24-/m0/s1 Key: LGVWLGJCDLVSOA-ZEQRLZLVSA-N
- SMILES: C1[C@H](N2C(=C/C(=C\3/C=C4C5=C(C[C@H](N4C3=O)C(=O)O)C6=CC=CC=C6N5)/C2=O)C7=C1C8=CC=CC=C8N7)C(=O)O; C1[C@H](N2C(=CC(=C2O)C3=CC4=C5C(=C6C=CC=CC6=N5)C[C@H](N4C3=O)C(=O)O)C7=C1C8=CC=CC=C8N7)C(=O)O

Properties
Chemical formula	C_{30}H_{20}N_{4}O_{6}
Molar mass	532.512 g·mol^{−1}
- Except where otherwise noted, data are given for materials in their standard state (at 25 °C [77 °F], 100 kPa). verify (what is ?) Infobox references

Trichotomine is a bright blue pigment found in the berries of the plant Clerodendrum trichotomum, which is native to China and Japan. It has a novel chromophore structure which differs from previously studied plant pigments. The amount of pigment in the berries increases as they become ripe.

== History and usage ==
The berries of C. trichotomum have historically been used in natural dyes. In 1978, a team of researchers at Nagoya University proposed that trichotomine was the pigment responsible for the color. This was confirmed in 1992.

Scientists have studied trichotomine as a potential plant-based alternative to blue artificial food dye. It is of interest partly because blue pigment is so rare in nature, so the number of viable options for pass production are limited compared with more common pigment colors, like red.

San-Ei Gen, a Japanese colorant manufacturer, has produced an extract of the pigment and used it for testing purposes. They found that trichotomine is not acutely poisonous to mice.

== See also ==
- Brilliant blue FCF
- Indigo dye
