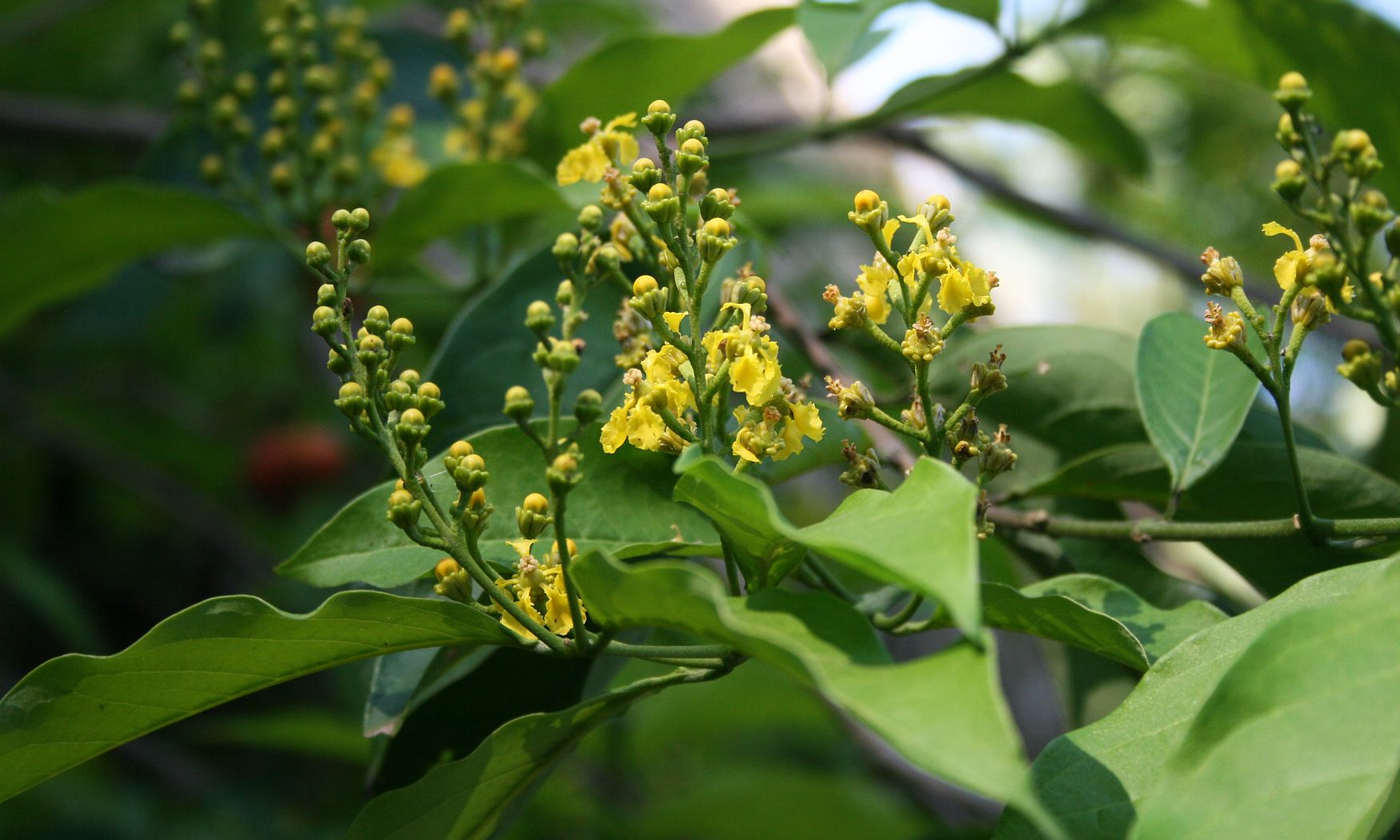

Conservation status
- Least Concern (IUCN 3.1)

Scientific classification
- Kingdom: Plantae
- Clade: Embryophytes
- Clade: Tracheophytes
- Clade: Angiosperms
- Clade: Eudicots
- Clade: Rosids
- Order: Malpighiales
- Family: Malpighiaceae
- Genus: Bunchosia
- Species: B. nitida

Binomial name
- Bunchosia nitida (Jacq.) DC. 1824

= Bunchosia nitida =

Species of plant

Bunchosia nitida is a species of shrub in the family of Malpighiaceae with a native range from southern Mexico to Brazil and the Caribbean Islands. It produces yellow flowers and bears edible fruit which turns orange in color when ripe.
