= Bunchosia cauliflora =

Conservation status
- Vulnerable (IUCN 3.1)

Scientific classification
- Kingdom: Plantae
- Clade: Tracheophytes
- Clade: Angiosperms
- Clade: Eudicots
- Clade: Rosids
- Order: Malpighiales
- Family: Malpighiaceae
- Genus: Bunchosia
- Species: B. cauliflora

Binomial name
- Bunchosia cauliflora W.R.Anderson

Species of flowering plant

Bunchosia cauliflora is a species of plant in the family Malpighiaceae. It is endemic to Ecuador. Its natural habitat is subtropical or tropical moist lowland forests.
