= Malpighia proctorii =

Conservation status
- Critically Endangered (IUCN 3.1)

Scientific classification
- Kingdom: Plantae
- Clade: Tracheophytes
- Clade: Angiosperms
- Clade: Eudicots
- Clade: Rosids
- Order: Malpighiales
- Family: Malpighiaceae
- Genus: Malpighia
- Species: M. proctorii

Binomial name
- Malpighia proctorii Vivaldi

Species of flowering plant

Malpighia proctorii is a species of plant in the family Malpighiaceae. It is endemic to Jamaica. It is threatened by habitat loss.
