= Malpighia cauliflora =

Conservation status
- Endangered (IUCN 2.3)

Scientific classification
- Kingdom: Plantae
- Clade: Embryophytes
- Clade: Tracheophytes
- Clade: Spermatophytes
- Clade: Angiosperms
- Clade: Eudicots
- Clade: Rosids
- Order: Malpighiales
- Family: Malpighiaceae
- Genus: Malpighia
- Species: M. cauliflora

Binomial name
- Malpighia cauliflora Proctor & Vivaldi

Species of flowering plant

Malpighia cauliflora is a species of flowering plant in the family Malpighiaceae, that is endemic to Jamaica. It is threatened by habitat loss.
