= Zygogonium ericetorum =

Scientific classification
- Kingdom: Plantae
- Class: Zygnematophyceae
- Order: Zygnematales
- Family: Zygnemataceae
- Genus: Zygogonium
- Species: Z. ericetorum

Binomial name
- Zygogonium ericetorum Kützing 1843

Species of alga

Zygogonium ericetorum is a species of alga belonging to the family Zygnemataceae.

It has cosmopolitan distribution.
