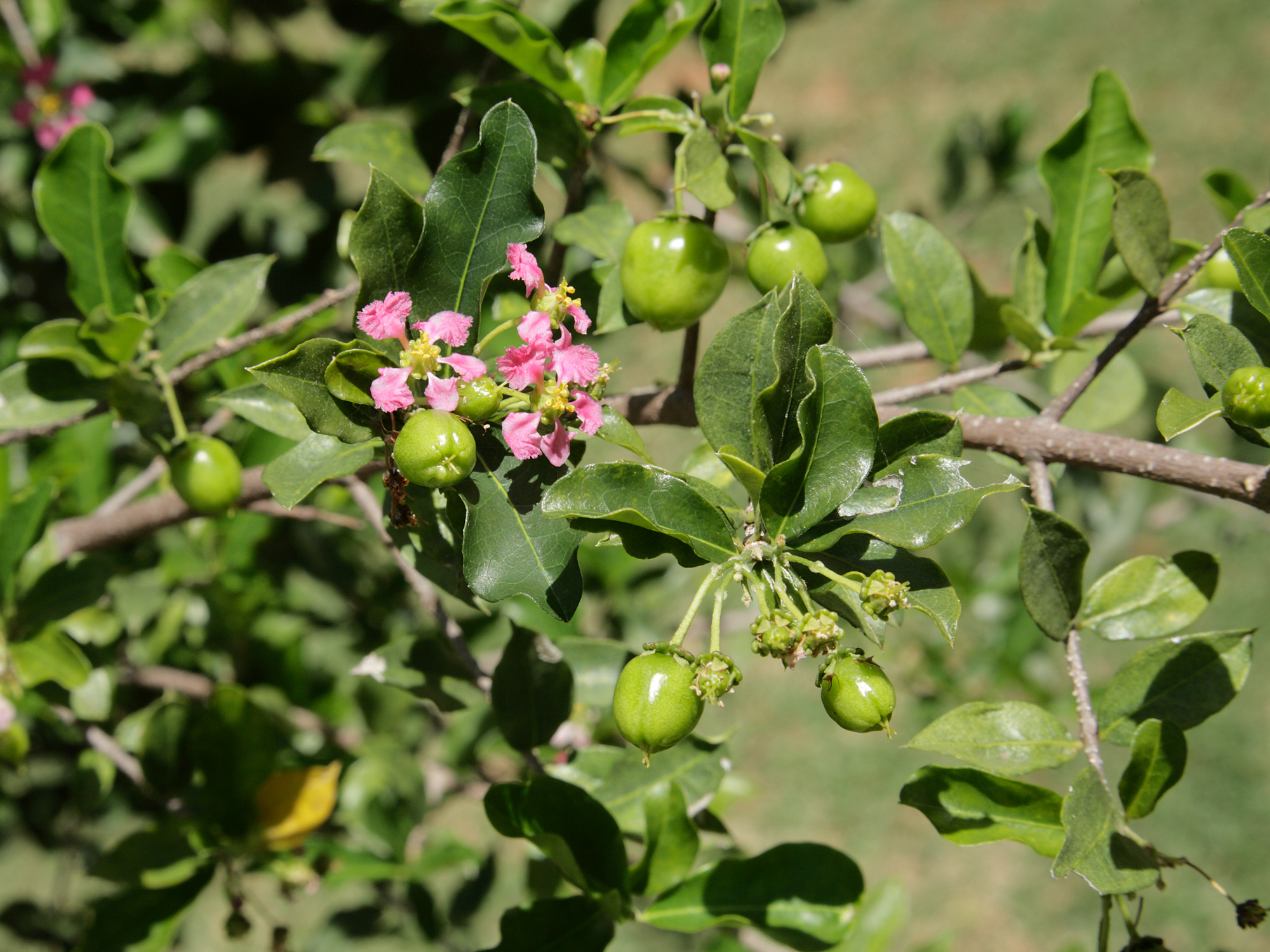
- Blossom and unripe fruit

Conservation status
- Data Deficient (IUCN 3.1)

Scientific classification
- Kingdom: Plantae
- Clade: Tracheophytes
- Clade: Angiosperms
- Clade: Eudicots
- Clade: Rosids
- Order: Malpighiales
- Family: Malpighiaceae
- Genus: Malpighia
- Species: M. emarginata

Binomial name
- Malpighia emarginata DC.

Synonyms
- Malpighia berteroana Spreng.; Malpighia lanceolata Griseb.; Malpighia punicifolia var. lancifolia Nied.; Malpighia punicifolia var. obovata Nied.; Malpighia punicifolia var. vulgaris Nied.; Malpighia retusa Benth.; Malpighia umbellata ROSE; Malpighia urens var. lanceolata (Griseb.) Griseb.

= Malpighia emarginata =

Species of plant

Malpighia emarginata is a tropical fruit-bearing shrub or small tree in the family Malpighiaceae native to the Neotropics. The fruit is notable for its exceptional richness in vitamin C and versatility in various food preparations.

== Names ==
Common names include acerola (from Arabic: الزُّعرُورَة, romanized: az-zuʿrūra "azarole" for a similar looking old-world fruit), Puerto Rican cherry, Guarani cherry, Barbados cherry, West Indian cherry, wild crepe myrtle, cereza, and cerise.

== Distribution ==
Malpighia emarginata is originally native to the Lesser Antilles islands of the southern Caribbean Sea, extending into South America as far south as Brazil. It has been introduced and even naturalized elsewhere in the neotropics, such as in Peru, Venezuela, and Ecuador, as well as the southernmost parts of the contiguous United States (southern Florida and the Lower Rio Grande Valley of Texas). In Florida, it can be grown in protected locations as far north as Cape Canaveral. It is cultivated in the tropics and subtropics throughout the world from southern Europe to parts of Africa, India, and Australia.

== Production ==
=== Brazil ===
Brazil is the largest producer of acerola worldwide. On 11,000 ha (27,000 acres), Brazil produces 32,990 t (36,370 tons) of acerola per year. In order to preserve the genetic variability of acerola, the federal rural University of Pernambuco in Brazil established an "Acerola Active Germplasm Bank" in June 1998.

== Growth conditions ==
Acerola can be propagated by seed, cutting, or other methods. It prefers dry, well-drained, sandy soil and full sun, and cannot endure temperatures lower than −1 °C (30 °F). Because of its shallow roots, it has very low tolerance to winds. Furthermore, a sufficient water supply is advantageous for good growth and maximum yields of large fruits. This is especially important during fruiting and flowering. The optimal growth conditions are reached at a mean temperature of 26 °C (79 °F) and 1,200–1,600 mm (47–63 in) of rainfall annually.

== Description ==
Acerola is an evergreen shrub or small tree with spreading branches on a short trunk. It is usually 2–3 m (6.6–9.8 ft) tall, but sometimes reaches 6 m (20 ft) in height. The chromosome number is 2n = 40.

=== Bark ===
The bark of young branches is green and sparsely covered with curly-haired trichomes, which fall off with age. The greyish to brownish bark is relatively smooth and covered with conspicuous cork pores when young. With age, it is thick and cracked.

=== Leaves ===
The leaves are simple, ovate to elliptic-lanceolate in outline, 2–8 cm (0.79–3.15 in) long, 1–4 cm (0.39–1.57 in) wide, with an entire or undulating margin. They are attached oppositely on the stem on short petioles. These leaves and petioles can irritate skin due to minute stinging hairs.

=== Flowers ===
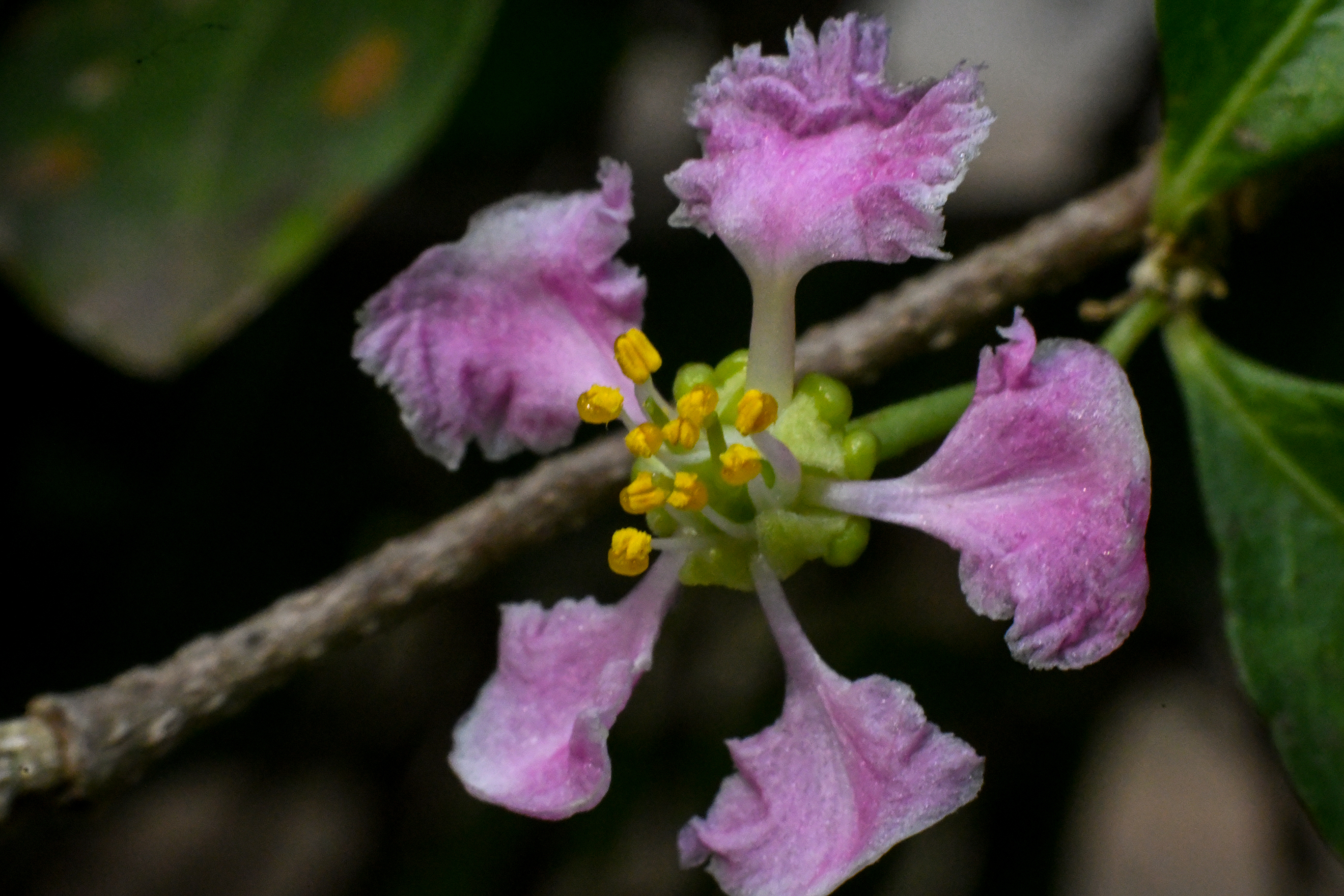
Flower

The tree flowers from April to November. Flowers are bisexual and 1–2 cm (0.39–0.79 in) in diameter. They have five pale to deep pink or red fringed petals, 10 stamens, and six to 10 glands on the calyx. The three to five flowers per inflorescence are sessile or short-peduncled axillary cymes.

=== Fruits and seeds ===
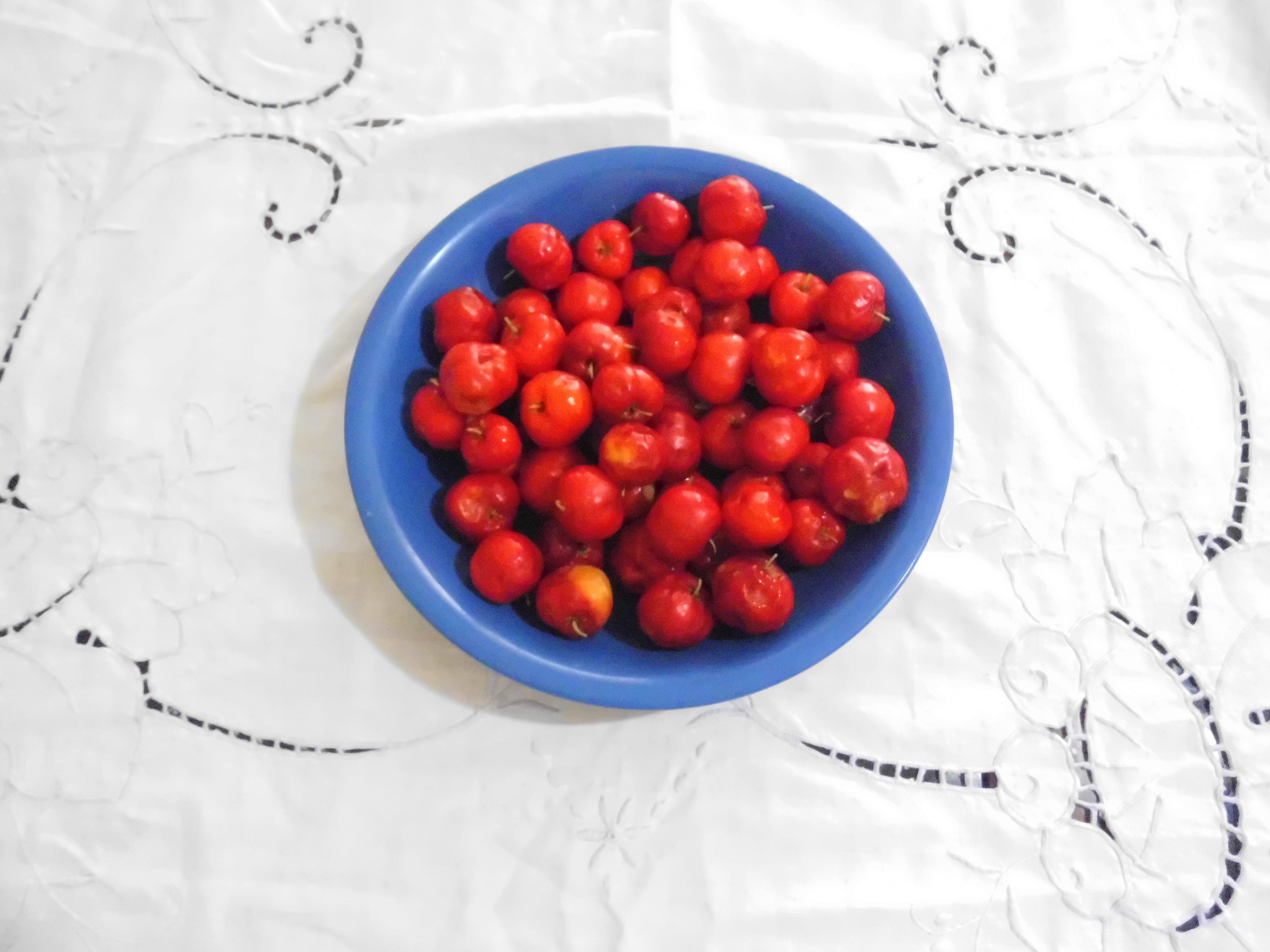
Malpighia emarginata fruit

Three years after planting, trees start producing fruits. 3–4 weeks after flowering, a number of bright red drupes 1–3 cm (0.39–1.18 in) in diameter with a mass of 3–5 g (0.11–0.18 oz) mature. The shell of the fruit is smooth and very thin. Its shelf life of 2–3 days at ambient temperature makes it highly perishable. Drupes are in pairs or groups of three, and each contains three triangular seeds. The drupes are juicy and high in vitamin C (3–46 mg/g or 1.5–20 grains per ounce) and other nutrients. They are divided into three obscure lobes and are usually acidic to subacidic, giving them a sour taste, but may be sweet if grown well.

== Cultivation methods ==
=== Yield and harvest ===
Acerola flowers and fruits already in the first year after planting but increases its production in the following years, reaching up to 47 kg (104 lb) per plant in the sixth year. The fruiting season usually extends from April to November. The fruits should be picked frequently, as they are not stored on the tree. Ripe fruit should be handled carefully to avoid bruising and should be utilized as soon as possible or frozen for later use. Semi-ripe fruit will usually keep for several days in the refrigerator. Pollination by wild insects increases the fruit yield.

=== Sowing ===
Plants can be set at any time of the year, but the best time is spring, just before the rainy season. Choose a location with good water drainage and in a sheltered spot.

== Pests and diseases ==
Malpighia emarginata is a host plant for the caterpillars of the white-patched skipper (Chiomara asychis), Florida duskywing (Ephyriades brunneus), and brown-banded skipper (Timochares ruptifasciatus). Larvae of the acerola weevil (Anthonomus macromalus) feed on the fruits, while adults consume young leaves.

== Nutritional value ==
Acerola, (West Indian cherry), raw
Nutritional value per 100 g (3.5 oz)
- Energy: 134 kJ (32 kcal)
- Carbohydrates: 7.69 g
- Dietary fiber: 1.1 g
- Fat: 0.3 g
- Protein: 0.4 g
Vitamins and minerals
Vitamins	Quantity %DV^{†}
Vitamin A equiv.	4% 38 μg
Thiamine (B1)	2% 0.02 mg
Riboflavin (B2)	5% 0.06 mg
Niacin (B3)	3% 0.4 mg
Pantothenic acid (B5)	6% 0.309 mg
Vitamin B6	1% 0.009 mg
Folate (B9)	4% 14 μg
Vitamin C	1864% 1677.6 mg
Minerals	Quantity %DV^{†}
Calcium	1% 12 mg
Iron	1% 0.2 mg
Magnesium	4% 18 mg
Manganese	26% 0.6 mg
Phosphorus	1% 11 mg
Potassium	5% 146 mg
Sodium	0% 7 mg
Zinc	1% 0.1 mg
- Other constituents: Quantity
- Water: 91 g
- Link to USDA Database entry
- ^{†}Percentages estimated using US recommendations for adults, except for potassium, which is estimated based on expert recommendation from the National Academies.

Acerola fruit is 91% water, 8% carbohydrates, and contains negligible protein and fat (table). In a reference amount of 100 g (3.5 oz), acerola supplies 32 calories, and is a rich source of manganese, and particularly vitamin C at some 20 times the Daily Value (DV), with other micronutrients at uniformly low levels (table).

Whereas the content of sugar, soluble solids and titratable acids increases with the ripening process of the fruit, the vitamin C content decreases. The immature green fruit is harvested for industrial use of the vitamin C.

== Uses ==
=== Culinary ===
Acerola cherry may be eaten raw or used as a juice or mixed with other, usually sweeter fruit juices. The fruits are used in jams, concentrates, stews, and liqueurs, possibly needing sugar to improve flavor. Cooked fruits are strained to remove the seeds, and the resulting sauce has uses on cake, pudding or ice cream.

Acerola cherry powder is also used in some commercially produced breads as a bread improver. Because acerola also contains pigments like anthocyanins and carotenoids, it could also be used as a food colorant.

=== Others ===
Acerola is a bonsai subject because of its small leaf and fruit, and fine ramification. It is also grown as an ornamental and for hedges.
