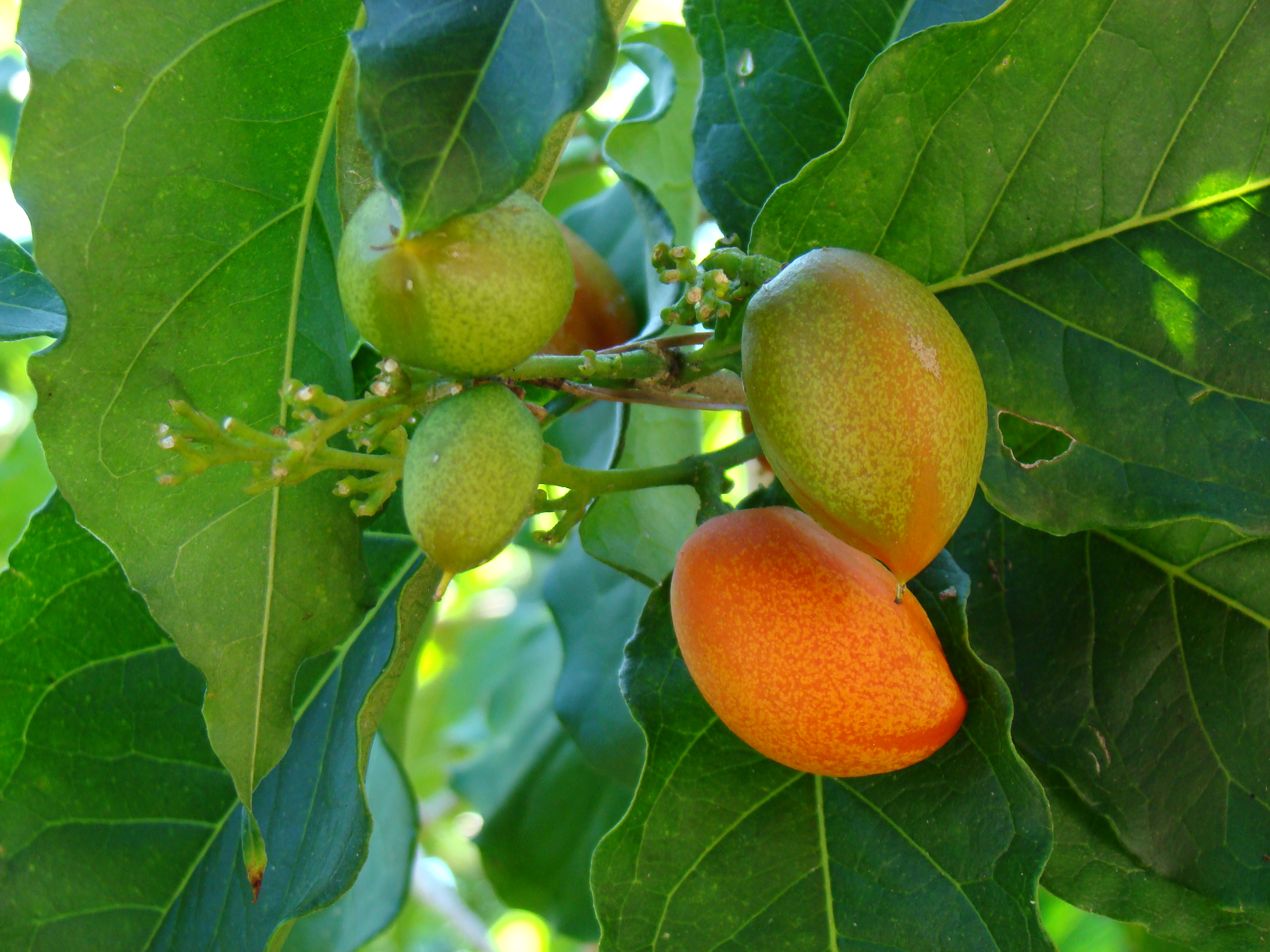
- Bunchosia glandulifera in Ft. Myers, Florida

Scientific classification
- Kingdom: Plantae
- Clade: Embryophytes
- Clade: Tracheophytes
- Clade: Angiosperms
- Clade: Eudicots
- Clade: Rosids
- Order: Malpighiales
- Family: Malpighiaceae
- Genus: Bunchosia
- Species: B. glandulifera

Binomial name
- Bunchosia glandulifera (Jacq.) Kunth.

= Bunchosia glandulifera =

Species of tree

Bunchosia glandulifera, commonly known as peanut butter fruit, is a species of flowering plant in the acerola family, Malpighiaceae, that is native to Central America and South America. It produces small orange-red fruits of sticky and dense pulp, with a flavour and aroma resembling that of peanut butter. It is mostly eaten fresh, but is also used for jellies, jams or preserves. The superficial appearance of the berries are similar to coffee and in Brazil is accordingly called caferana or falso guarana.

Bunchosia glandulifera has been introduced to the U.S. horticulture as Bunchosia argentea and was further distributed under this name.

== Description ==
The leaves are lightly sericeous (hairy) and have wavy edges. Bunchosia glandulifera grows as an evergreen shrub or smaller tree up to about 7–8 meters high. In cultivation the tree ideally reaches up to 6 metres (20 feet) in diameter, although can be maintained to a smaller size. The bark is grayish-brown, smooth to slightly rough or nodular. The trunk provides rubber. The tree is fast-growing and has some frost-tolerance.

Despite being misidentified as Bunchosia argentea, Bunchosia glandulifera can be easily distinguished based on differences in its leaves. Furthermore Bunchosia argentea has not been cultivated.

The fruits are ellipsoidal, almost smooth, slightly hairy and orange to red, briefly tipped berries with a thin, somewhat rubbery skin. They are about 2–3.5 centimeters long and contain 1 or mostly 2 free, about 1–1.5 centimeters long and light brownish, elliptical, somewhat flattened on one side and relatively smooth and bony seeds. The red pulp is sticky, slightly juicy and sweet. Fruits can be harvested not yet fully ripe, still orange, and then left to ripen for two days, to become red and soft.

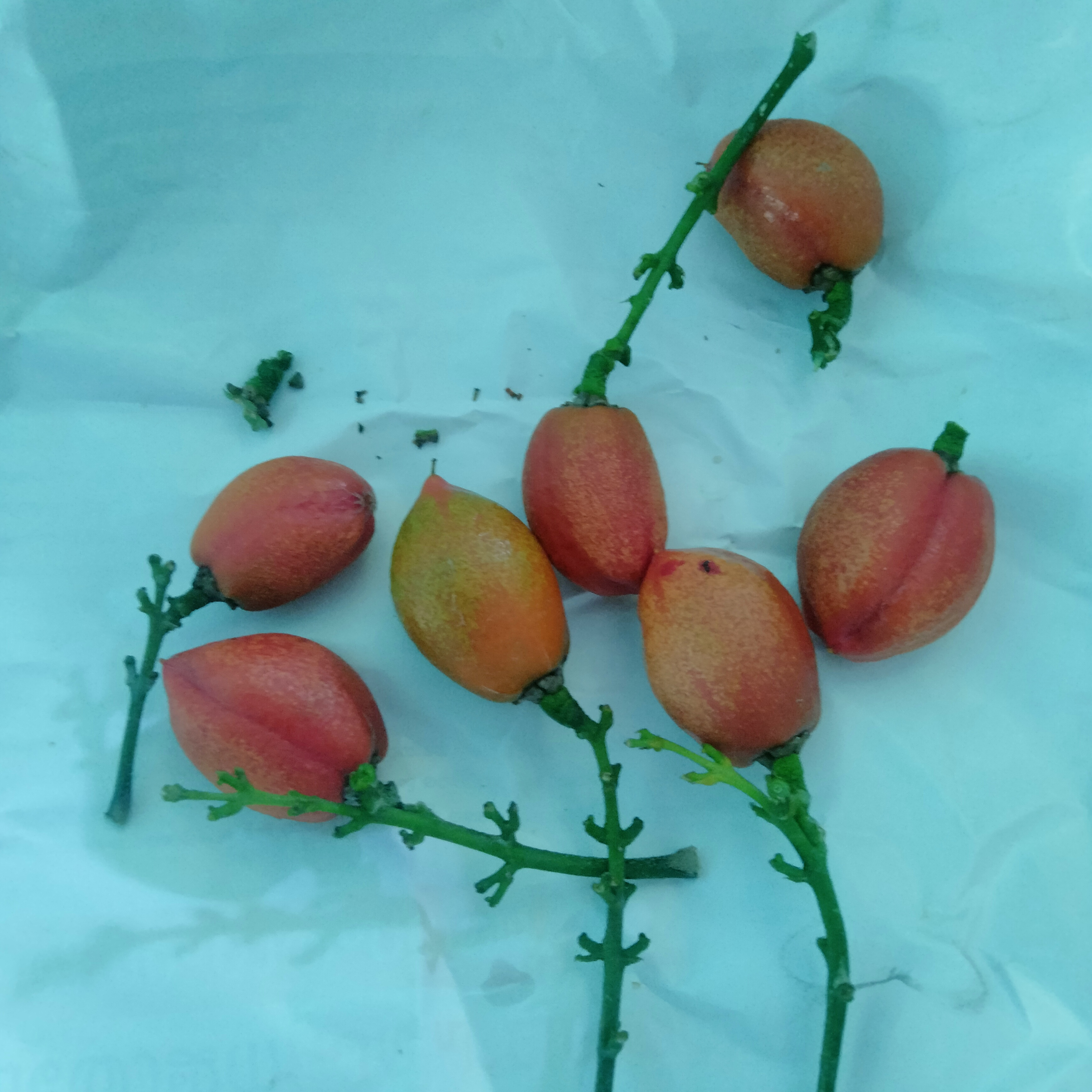
Bunchosia glandulifera fruit

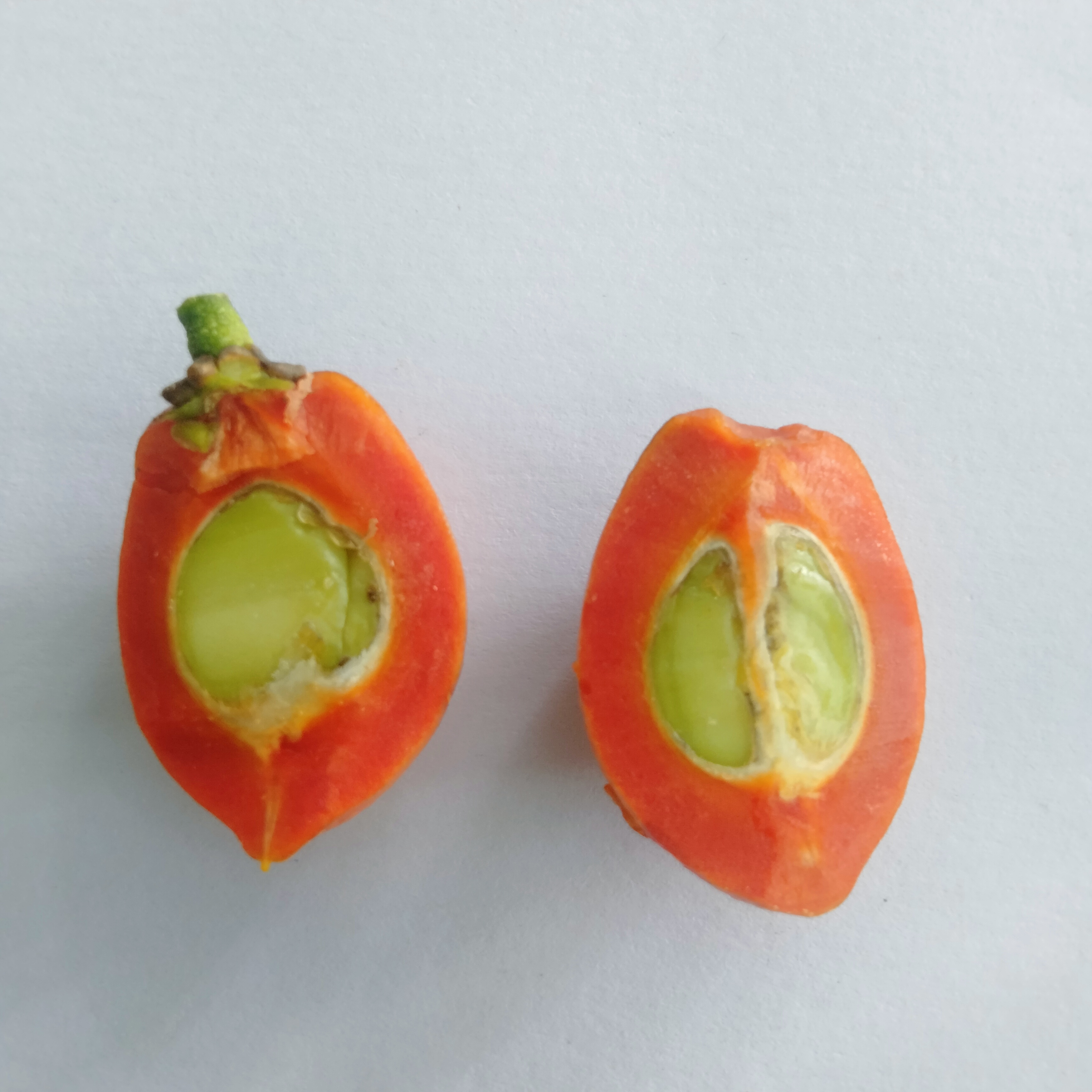
Bunchosia glandulifera section

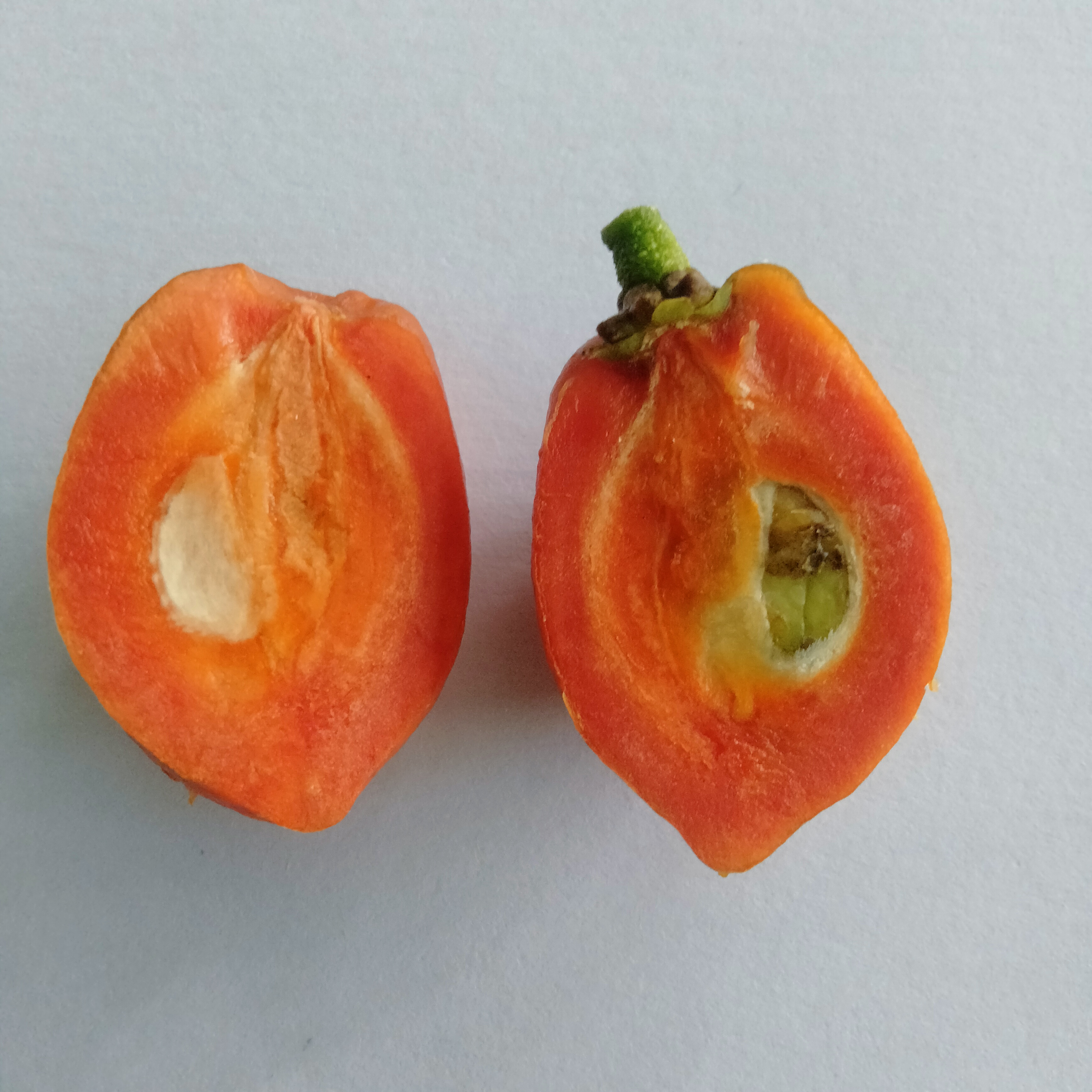
Bunchosia glandulifera section
