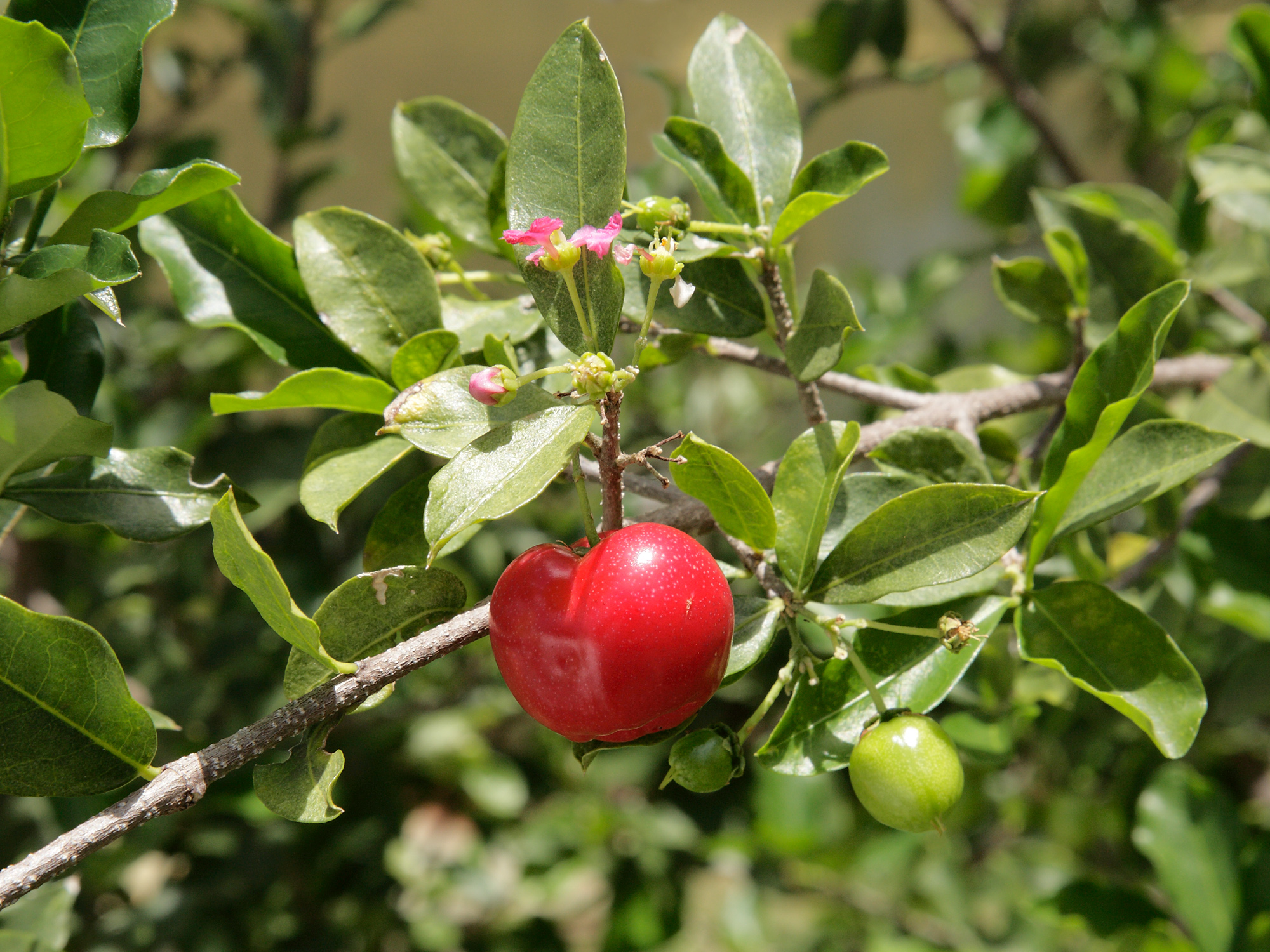

Scientific classification
- Kingdom: Plantae
- Clade: Tracheophytes
- Clade: Angiosperms
- Clade: Eudicots
- Clade: Rosids
- Order: Malpighiales
- Family: Malpighiaceae
- Genus: Malpighia
- Species: M. glabra

Binomial name
- Malpighia glabra L.

Synonyms
- Bunchosia parvifolia S.Watson; Malpighia biflora Poir.; Malpighia dicipiens Sessé & Moc.; Malpighia fallax Salisb.; Malpighia lucida Pav. ex A. Juss.; Malpighia lucida Pav. ex Moric.; Malpighia myrtoides Moritz ex Nied.; Malpighia neumanniana A. Juss.; Malpighia nitida Mill.; Malpighia oxycocca var. biflora (Poir.) Nied.; Malpighia peruviana Moric.; Malpighia punicifolia L.; Malpighia semeruco A.Juss.; Malpighia undulata A. Juss.; Malpighia uniflora Tussac; Malpighia virgata Pav.

= Malpighia glabra =

Wild Crapemyrtle

Species of shrub

Malpighia glabra, the wild crapemyrtle, is a tropical fruit-bearing shrub or small tree in the family Malpighiaceae. It has often been confused with the related cultivated crop tree M. emarginata, but has small insipid fruit and a very different flower structure.
