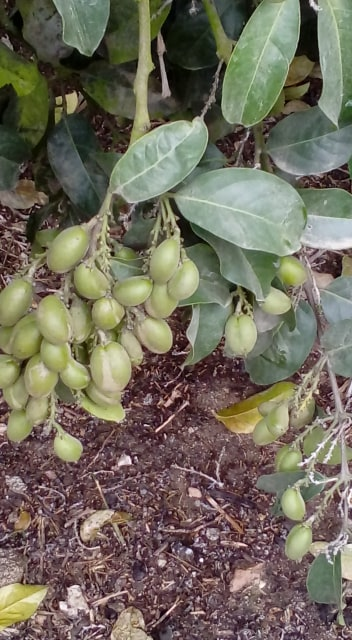
- Bunchosia armeniaca with immature fruit.

Scientific classification
- Kingdom: Plantae
- Clade: Tracheophytes
- Clade: Angiosperms
- Clade: Eudicots
- Clade: Rosids
- Order: Malpighiales
- Family: Malpighiaceae
- Genus: Bunchosia
- Species: B. armeniaca

Binomial name
- Bunchosia armeniaca (Cav.) DC.

Synonyms
- Bunchosia armeniaca f. parvifolia Nied.; Bunchosia armeniaca f. systyla Nied.; Malpighia armeniaca Cav.

= Bunchosia armeniaca =

Species of tree

Bunchosia armeniaca is a species in the family Malpighiaceae native to northwestern South America (Colombia, Ecuador, Bolivia, Venezuela, Brazil, and Peru). Common names include cansaboca, cirhuela de frayle, ciruela de fraile (friar's plum), guáimaro, indano, and mamey de tierra fría (cold-earth mamey). Its Kichwa name is usuma.

Bunchosia armeniaca can attain a height of 20 meters, but it commonly grows to 5 meters. It can be found between 100–2600 m of elevation in a wide range of ecological habitats.

Bunchosia armeniaca yields a fruit that is very sweet and with cloying red pulp, which adheres strongly to the seeds, hence the Spanish etymology cansaboca (tired mouth). The two seeds in each berry were said to be poisonous by Joseph Dombey. Due to rapid spoilage on the tree, the fruit are often harvested while still a creamy-green and ripened to a red colour indoors.
