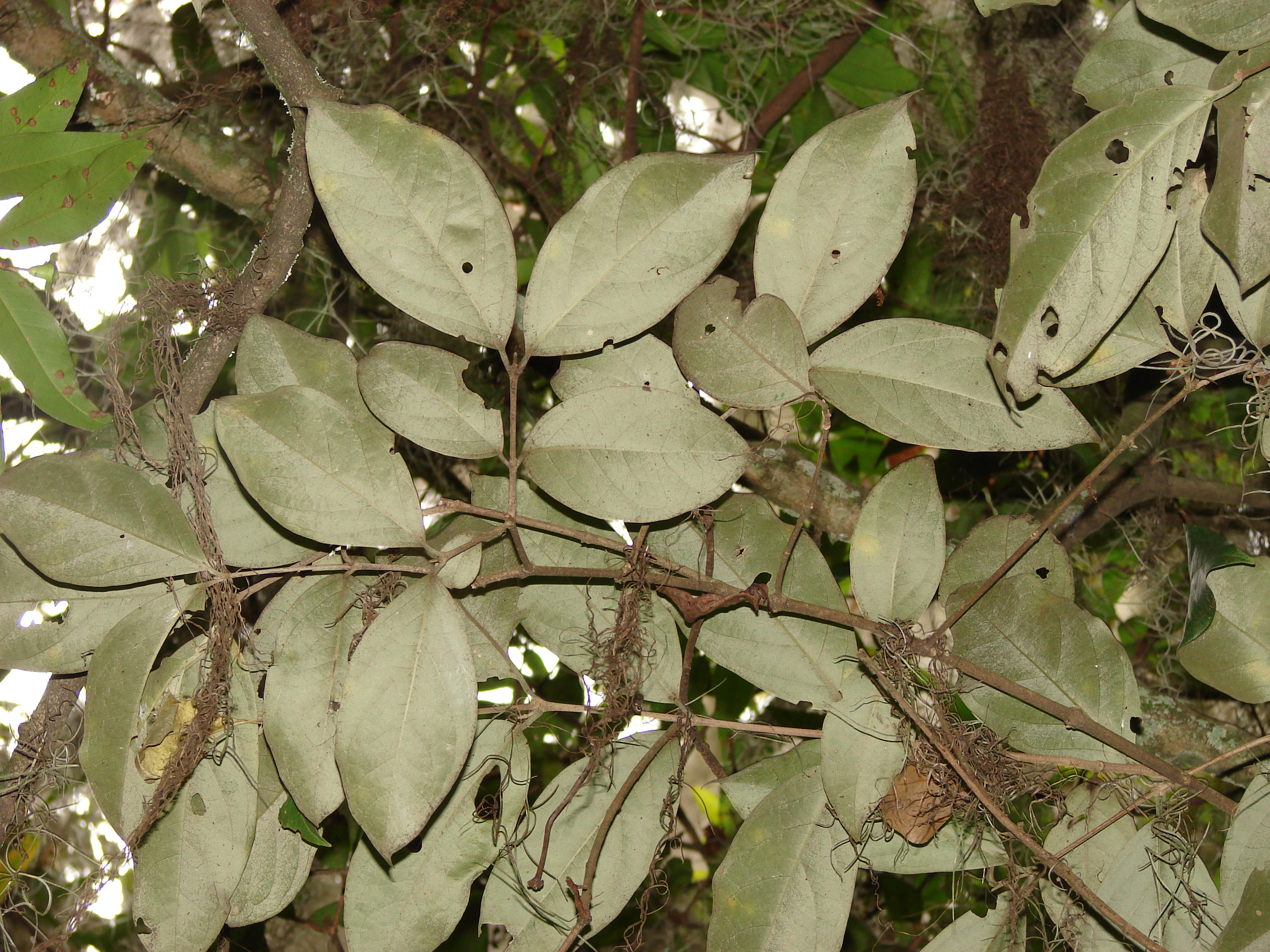
- B. argentea in Venezuela

Scientific classification
- Kingdom: Plantae
- Clade: Tracheophytes
- Clade: Angiosperms
- Clade: Eudicots
- Clade: Rosids
- Order: Malpighiales
- Family: Malpighiaceae
- Genus: Bunchosia
- Species: B. argentea

Binomial name
- Bunchosia argentea (Jacq.) DC.

= Bunchosia argentea =

Species of tree

Bunchosia argentea, known as silver peanut butter fruit, is a species of flowering plant in the acerola family, Malpighiaceae, that is native to Venezuela, Colombia, Peru, Brazil, Guyana and Suriname. It produces small orange-red fruits that are sericeous (finely haired) of pleasant taste similar to peanut butter. Leaves have pointed ends and are densely silvery or golden sericeous on the abaxial side.

== Confusion with Bunchosia glandulifera ==
Bunchosia glandulifera is often misidentified as Bunchosia argentea. The main distinctive character is in the leaves. Furthermore, Bunchosia argentea has not been cultivated.
