= Dudleya formosa =

Scientific classification
- Kingdom: Plantae
- Clade: Tracheophytes
- Clade: Angiosperms
- Clade: Eudicots
- Order: Saxifragales
- Family: Crassulaceae
- Genus: Dudleya
- Species: D. formosa

Binomial name
- Dudleya formosa Moran, 1950

Species of plant

Dudleya formosa, known by the common name La Misión liveforever, is a species of perennial succulent plant endemic to the Guadalupe Valley in Baja California. It is characterized by bright green leaves, red floral stems, and pink flowers.

== Description ==
=== Morphology ===
Dudleya formosa has a trailing caudex, 0.5 to 2.5 cm thick, becoming over 5 decimeters (dm) long, branching to form a loose, prostrate mound that can reach up to several hundred rosettes. Rosettes are flattish, 4 to 13 cm in diameter with around 10 to 20 leaves. Leaves are oblong to oblong-obovate, acute to obtuse with a sharp tip 0.5 mm long. Foliage is a bright green, and like other Dudleya the leaves are tinged with a red hue at the tips and margins. Leaves are not glaucous. Measurements of the leaves put them at 2 to 8 cm long, 1 to 3 cm wide, and 3 to 6 mm thick.

Delving further into D. formosa's leaf morphology, leaves are convex below (ventrally), and flat above (dorsally). Leaf margins are subacute. The base is 10 to 20 mm wide, and 1 to 4 mm high, but rarely, on rapidly growing stems, it is decurrent and up to 10 mm high.

The peduncle is red, 4 to 15 cm high, and 3 to 6 mm thick, with foliage covering 2 to 5 cm. of the base. There are 10 to 17 bracts, which are close-set, horizontal, ovate to triangular lanceolate, cordate, and acute, with the lowermost being 8 to 21 mm long, and 4 to 12 mm wide. The inflorescence has a more pink hue, and is rather dense, being shaped somewhat flat-topped to hemispherical. It is 2 to 6 cm in diameter, with usually 3 to 7 close set branches that rebranch once or twice. The cincinni may be spreading or ascending, and up to 2 cm long, with 2 to 6 flowers. The pedicels are erect and stout, with the lowermost pedicels 1 to 3 mm long and 2 to 2.5 mm thick.

Held on the pedicels are the flowers. The calyx is rounded below, 4 to 5 mm wide and 2 to 3 mm high, with sepals being triangular, acute, and 1 to 2 mm long, 2 to 3 mm wide. The sinuses, the cavity between the sepals, are broad and rounded. Petals are white and tinged with pink, or may have a bright red keel. The shape of the petals has them elliptic, acute, 8 to 9 mm long, 3 to 4 mm wide, expanding laterally from just below the middle, and 1 to 1.5 mm connate. Within the flower, the filaments are 5 to 6.5 mm long, adnate, with the epipetalous stamens slightly shorter than the antesepalous stamens. Anthers are red, and carpels are 6 to 7 mm high, with thin styles 2 to 2.5 mm long.

The seeds of D. formosa are brown, ovoid, and 1 mm long. They are covered in longitudinal striations, characteristic of their genus.

== Taxonomy ==
=== Taxonomic history and phylogeny ===
Dudleya formosa was discovered in July 1945 by a Mr. Fred Wylie, who sent the specimen to the San Diego Natural History Museum. After the specimen was rediscovered by Mrs. Ethel B. Higgins, D. formosa was described by Reid Moran in the year 1950. Dr. Charles H. Uhl of Cornell University reports a haploid number of 17 chromosomes. D. formosa was initially placed under the subgenus Stylophyllum due to the spreading petals and carpels. Since recent phylogenetic analysis has disregarded the existence of the subgenus Stylophyllum, D. formosa instead finds itself placed in a proposed clade Formosa, along with D. edulis and some members of D. attenuata.

=== Characteristics ===
Dudleya formosa finds itself distinguished from other members in its clade through its short and broad rosette leaves. The dense inflorescence, stout pedicels, and pink, spreading petals further separate it as a species.

Key for differentiating D. formosa from other Dudleya
| Species | Leaf shape | Leaf characteristics | Peduncle height | Inflorescence | Petals | Native to Baja California? |
|---|---|---|---|---|---|---|
| Dudleya formosa | Short, broad | Not glaucous or viscid | 4 to 15 cm | Dense | White – pink, spreading | Yes |
| Dudleya anomala | Narrow | Viscid | 5 to 15 cm | Open | White, somewhat spreading | Yes |
| Dudleya densiflora | Long, slender | Glaucous, more numerous | 10 to 30 cm | Dense | White - pink, spreading | No |
| Dudleya edulis | Long, slender | Waxy | 10 to 50 cm | Open | White, spreading, but narrower | Yes |
| Dudleya stolonifera | Broad | Not glaucous or viscid | 2 to 25 cm | Open | Yellow, connate | No |
| Dudleya traskiae | Long, broad | Glaucous, more numerous | 20 to 50 cm | - | Bright yellow, less spreading | No |
| Dudleya virens | Long, broad | Glaucous or not | 6 to 70 cm | Open | White, spreading | Yes (Guadalupe Island) |
| Dudleya viscida | Long, slender | Viscid, more numerous | 15 to 70 cm | - | White – pink, somewhat spreading | No |

=== Hybrids ===
- Dudleya attenuata subsp. attenuata × D. formosa (Guadalupe Valley hybrid liveforever) - Occurs on the south side of the Guadalupe Valley northeast of Ensenada.
- Dudleya brittonii × D. formosa (Britton hybrid liveforever) - Confined to the mouth of the Rio Guadalupe north of Ensenada.
- Dudleya edulis × D. formosa (Guadalupe La Misión hybrid liveforever) - Occurs on the south side of the Guadalupe Valley.

== Distribution and habitat ==
Dudleya formosa occurs in the Guadalupe Valley in far northwestern Baja California. It is particularly located around the vicinity of the town of La Misión. It occurs on north-facing cliffs on basaltic rock.
