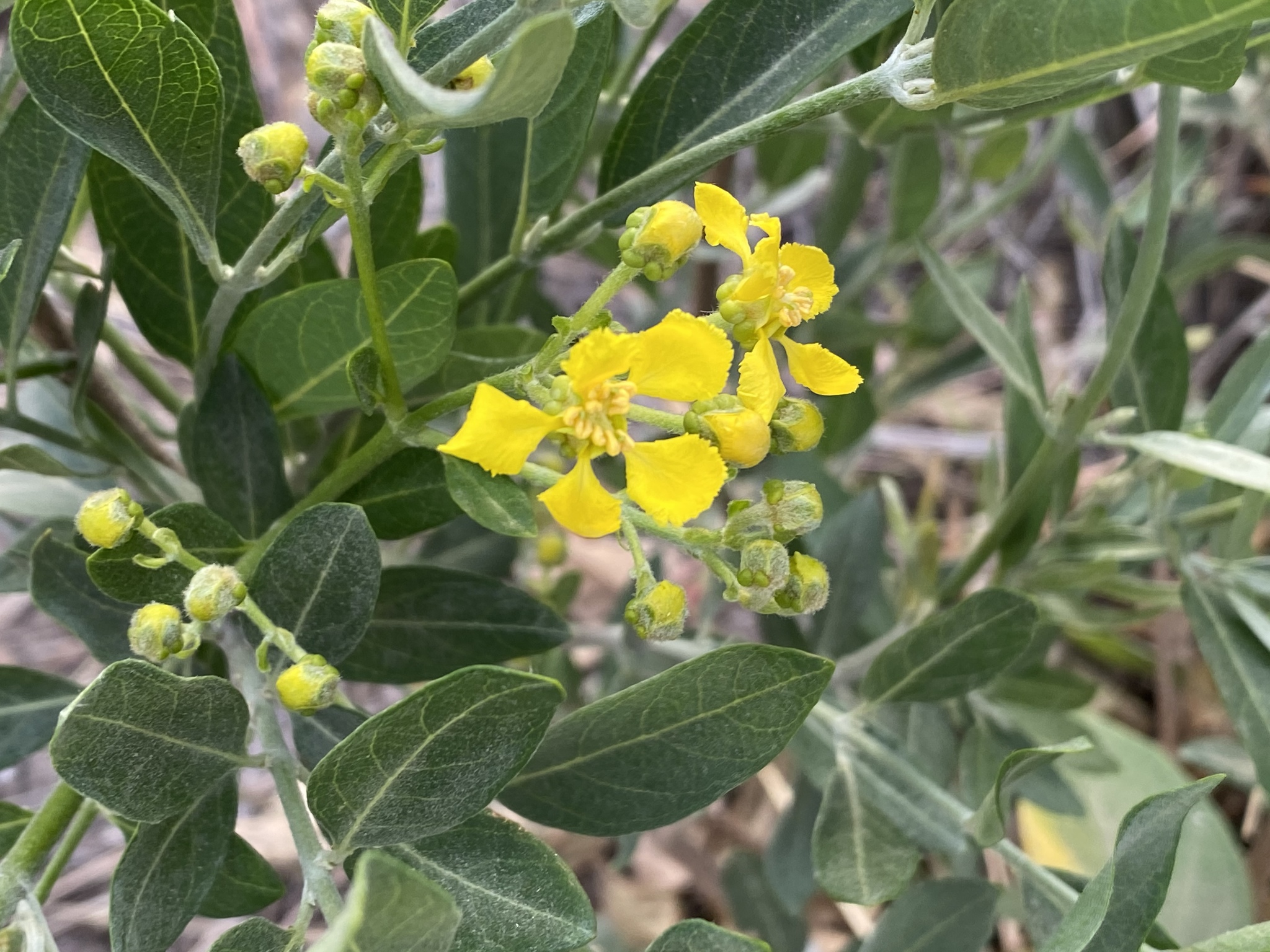
- Mascagnia macroptera

Scientific classification
- Kingdom: Plantae
- Clade: Tracheophytes
- Clade: Angiosperms
- Clade: Eudicots
- Clade: Rosids
- Order: Malpighiales
- Family: Malpighiaceae
- Genus: Mascagnia (Bertero ex DC.) Colla

Species
- ca. 45 species; see text

= Mascagnia =

Genus of flowering plants

Mascagnia is a genus in the Malpighiaceae, a family of about 75 genera of flowering plants in the order Malpighiales. The genus Mascagnia comprises about 45 species that occur in diverse habitats from northern Mexico and the Caribbean to northern Argentina and south-eastern Brazil.

Mascagnia in the traditional sense was a highly polyphyletic assemblage, a form-genus based on the lateral-winged samaras. Since the mid-1980s, morphological and molecular studies led to the removal of discordant elements, which were assigned to the genera Adelphia, Aenigmatanthera, Alicia, Amorimia, Calcicola, Callaeum, Carolus, Christianella, Malpighiodes, Niedenzuella, and Psychopterys. In addition, phylogenetic analyses showed that Triopterys is nested within Mascagnia. The species formerly assigned to Triopterys were transferred to Mascagnia, which is now a monophyletic genus.

The correct name for the species often called Mascagnia macroptera in the horticulture trade is Callaeum macropterum; the names are not interchangeable. Most of the plants sold in the US under the names Callaeum macropterum and Mascagnia macroptera are actually Callaeum septentrionale.

Species currently recognized

- Mascagnia adamsii W.R.Anderson & C.Davis
- Mascagnia aequatorialis W.R.Anderson & C.Davis
- Mascagnia affinis W.R.Anderson & C.Davis
- Mascagnia allopterys (Moris) W.R.Anderson
- Mascagnia almedae W.R.Anderson
- Mascagnia aptera W.R.Anderson
- Mascagnia arenicola C.E.Anderson
- Mascagnia australis C.E.Anderson
- Mascagnia bierosa (Adr.Juss.) W.R.Anderson
- Mascagnia boliviana C.E.Anderson
- Mascagnia brevifolia Griseb.
- Mascagnia brittonii Small
- Mascagnia buchii Urb. & Nied.
- Mascagnia conformis W.R.Anderson
- Mascagnia cordifolia (Adr.Juss.) Griseb.
- Mascagnia cynanchifolia Griseb.
- Mascagnia dissimilis C.V.Morton & Moldenke
- Mascagnia divaricata (H.B.K.) Nied.
- Mascagnia eggersiana (Nied.) W.R.Anderson
- Mascagnia glabrata W.R.Anderson & C.Davis
- Mascagnia haenkeana W.R.Anderson
- Mascagnia lilacina (S.Watson) Nied.
- Mascagnia loretensis C.V.Morton
- Mascagnia lucida (H.B.K.) W.R.Anderson & C.Davis
- Mascagnia lugoi W.R.Anderson
- Mascagnia macradena (DC.) Nied.
- Mascagnia ovatifolia (H.B.K.) Griseb.
- Mascagnia paniculata (Mill.) W.R.Anderson & C.Davis
- Mascagnia peruviana Cuatrec.
- Mascagnia pittieri C.V.Morton
- Mascagnia polybotrya (Adr.Juss.) Nied.
- Mascagnia riparia C.E.Anderson
- Mascagnia schunkei W.R.Anderson
- Mascagnia sepium (Adr.Juss.) Griseb.
- Mascagnia strigulosa (Rusby) Nied.
- Mascagnia tenuifolia Nied.
- Mascagnia tomentosa C.E.Anderson
- Mascagnia tucuruensis C.E.Anderson
- Mascagnia vacciniifolia Nied.
- Mascagnia velutina C.E.Anderson
- Mascagnia violacea (Triana & Planch.) Nied.
