= Callaeum antifebrile =

Scientific classification
- Kingdom: Plantae
- Clade: Tracheophytes
- Clade: Angiosperms
- Clade: Eudicots
- Clade: Rosids
- Order: Malpighiales
- Family: Malpighiaceae
- Genus: Callaeum
- Species: C. antifebrile

Binomial name
- Callaeum antifebrile (Griseb.) D.M.Johnson

Synonyms
- Banisteria antifebrilis Ruiz ex Griseb.; Cabi paraensis Ducke; Mascagnia psilophylla var. antifebrilis (Griseb.) Nied.; Mascagnia psilophylla f. peruviana Nied.

Species of flowering plant

Callaeum antifebrile is a South American jungle vine of the family Malpighiaceae which occurs predominantly throughout the Upper Amazon basin, and less frequently along the Lower Amazon. Occasionally a component in ayahuasca decoctions, it is used as a folk medicine in some parts of Brazil, often as an antifebrile (anti-fever) remedy.

== Ethnobotany ==
=== Vernacular names ===
- agahuasca
- ayahuasca negro
- bejuco de las calenturas (“fever vine”)
- caabi
- pajezinho
- shillinto
- shillinto blanco
- shillinto negro

=== Traditional use ===
Callaeum antifebrile is used in folk medicine, particularly in the northern Brazilian state of Pará. In addition to being used as a febrifuge (anti-fever remedy), bathing in an infusion of the plant is said to combat the evil eye, panemice (a curse or disease where the victim is afflicted by bad luck), headaches, or “thick blood,” and the juice of the plant is used to treat gastritis, stomach ulcer, and skin eruptions. It may also be used to treat rheumatism, erysipelas (a skin infection), and stroke, and it may be employed when giving massages to pregnant women.

It has occasionally been reported that C. antifebrile is used as a hallucinogen in the same manner as Banisteriopsis caapi, but this has not been entirely substantiated in any of the published literature. Some sources reference an early paper by Alfonso Ducke as the source of this claim, but Ducke said that although the plant was used in “popular medicine and sorcery,” he did not know whether it “has any narcotic property.” In 1928, the German botanist Franz Josef Niedenzu, a specialist in the Malpighiaceae, published comments on some specimens housed in the Berlin herbarium. He identified the leaves of C. antifebrile in a collection of ayawasca from the Yarinacocha District of Peru, but the attached packet of samaras belonged to a different species, Banisteriopsis quitensis (at present, B. quitensis is regarded as a synonym of B. caapi, but Niedenzu treated them as separate species). Pablo Amaringo reports that C. antifebrile, which he refers to as shillinto, is used as an additive in ayahuasca but not as the primary basis of the brew.

The Italian missionary Giuseppe Emanuele Castrucci reported in 1854 that he had observed the use of this liana (indicated as supay-guasca) for divinatory purposes through visionary effects within an ethnic group residing at the mouth of the Rio Napo.

== Chemistry ==
The stems and leaves of C. antifebrile have been reported to contain harmine. No other alkaloids have been reported, but no chemical analysis has been conducted on the plant in the last half century.

== Botany ==
=== Description ===
Woody vine or climbing shrub 3-15 m high; stems glabrous or slightly sericeous, terete, olive-green to dull brown; pith white and spongy, or absent; interpetiolar ridges present. Lamina of larger leaves 9-16 cm long, 3.5-8.5 cm wide, lanceolate-ovate to ovate, cuneate or rounded at base, short- to long-acuminate at apex, sparsely sericeous below, soon glabrate, glabrous above, 0-8 abaxial glands borne at the margin toward the lamina base on either side; petiole 8-34 mm long, bearing minute stipules at base. Inflorescence compound, of 1-7 four-flowered umbels racemosely arranged, the floriferous shoots usually 2 per leaf axil; bracts 0.6-1.3 mm long; peduncle 3-7 mm long; bracteoles 1.0-1.7 mm long, opposite, glabrate, near peduncle apex. Pedicel 6-11 mm long, circinate in young buds, divergent in umbel. Sepals abaxially sericeous, the lateral 4 exceeding the glands by 0.6-1.1 mm, the glands ovate or oblong, 1.3-3.5 mm long. Petals abaxially sericeous, sometimes sparsely so, the 4 lateral ones 5.9-14.6 mm long, 4.2-9.8 mm wide; posterior petal 5.6-11.6 mm long, 3.3-7.3 mm wide, with a claw 0.4-1.5 mm wide forming 1/4 to 1/2 of the petal length. Filaments 1.6-2.3 mm long, 1/3-1/2 connate; posterior anthers three, 0.5 mm long, anterior anthers seven, 1.0-1.2 mm long; connectives convex and faceted. Styles 1.7-2.8 mm long, straight or slightly sinuous, sericeous at base, slightly expanded at apex. Mericarp 3-lobed, corky, 1.5-2.0 cm wide, the lobes ridged, occasionally bearing wings 1.0 cm high and 0.3-0.5 cm wide; intermediate winglets absent; ventral areole 8-10.5 mm high, 5-6 mm wide, ovate.

Additional botanical descriptions may be found from Grisebach, Niedenzu, Ducke, Macbride, Brako & Zarucchi, Jørgensen & León-Yánez, and Jørgensen, Nee, and Beck.

=== Relation to other malpighiaceae ===
Phylogenetic analysis indicates that the genus Callaeum (represented in the study by C. septentrionale) may be grouped with the genera Alicia and Malpighiodes (represented by A. anisopetala and M. bracteosa, respectively) into a single monophyletic clade (note that Alicia and Malpighiodes were only recently segregated from the genus Mascagnia in 2006).
