= Alicia anisopetala =

Scientific classification
- Kingdom: Plantae
- Clade: Embryophytes
- Clade: Tracheophytes
- Clade: Spermatophytes
- Clade: Angiosperms
- Clade: Eudicots
- Clade: Rosids
- Order: Malpighiales
- Family: Malpighiaceae
- Genus: Alicia
- Species: A. anisopetala

Binomial name
- Alicia anisopetala (Adr. Juss.) W.R.Anderson

Synonyms
- Hiraea anisopetala A.Juss.; Mascagnia anisopetala (A.Juss.) Griseb.; Mascagnia anisopetala f. typica Nied.; Hiraea macrocarpa Chodat; Mascagnia anisopetala f. oblonga Nied.; Mascagnia nobilis C.V.Morton

South American species of flowering vine

Alicia anisopetala is a South American liana, a type of woody vine. It is native to Argentina Northeast, Bolivia, Brazil Northeast, Brazil South, Brazil Southeast, Brazil West-Central, Paraguay and Peru. Despite its availability from online sellers and marketing as "black" ayahuasca, it has been poorly studied and lacks an established safety profile.

No histochemistry had been performed on this species as of 2023.

== See also ==
- List of psychoactive plants
