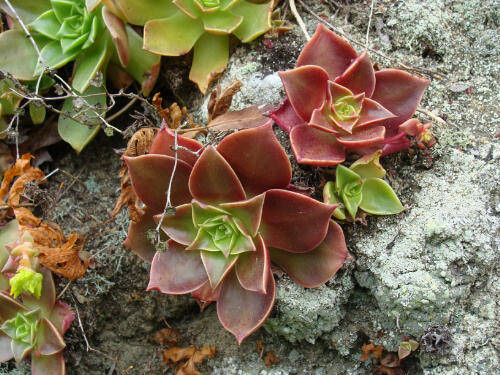

Conservation status
- Critically Imperiled (NatureServe)

Scientific classification
- Kingdom: Plantae
- Clade: Tracheophytes
- Clade: Angiosperms
- Clade: Eudicots
- Order: Saxifragales
- Family: Crassulaceae
- Genus: Dudleya
- Species: D. stolonifera

Binomial name
- Dudleya stolonifera Moran

= Dudleya stolonifera =

Species of succulent

Dudleya stolonifera is a succulent plant known by the common name Laguna Beach liveforever or Laguna Beach dudleya. This is a rare plant which is endemic to the coastline of Orange County, California. It is known from only about six populations in the vicinity of Laguna Beach, totaling about 30,000 individuals. It is federally listed as a threatened species of the United States.

== Description ==
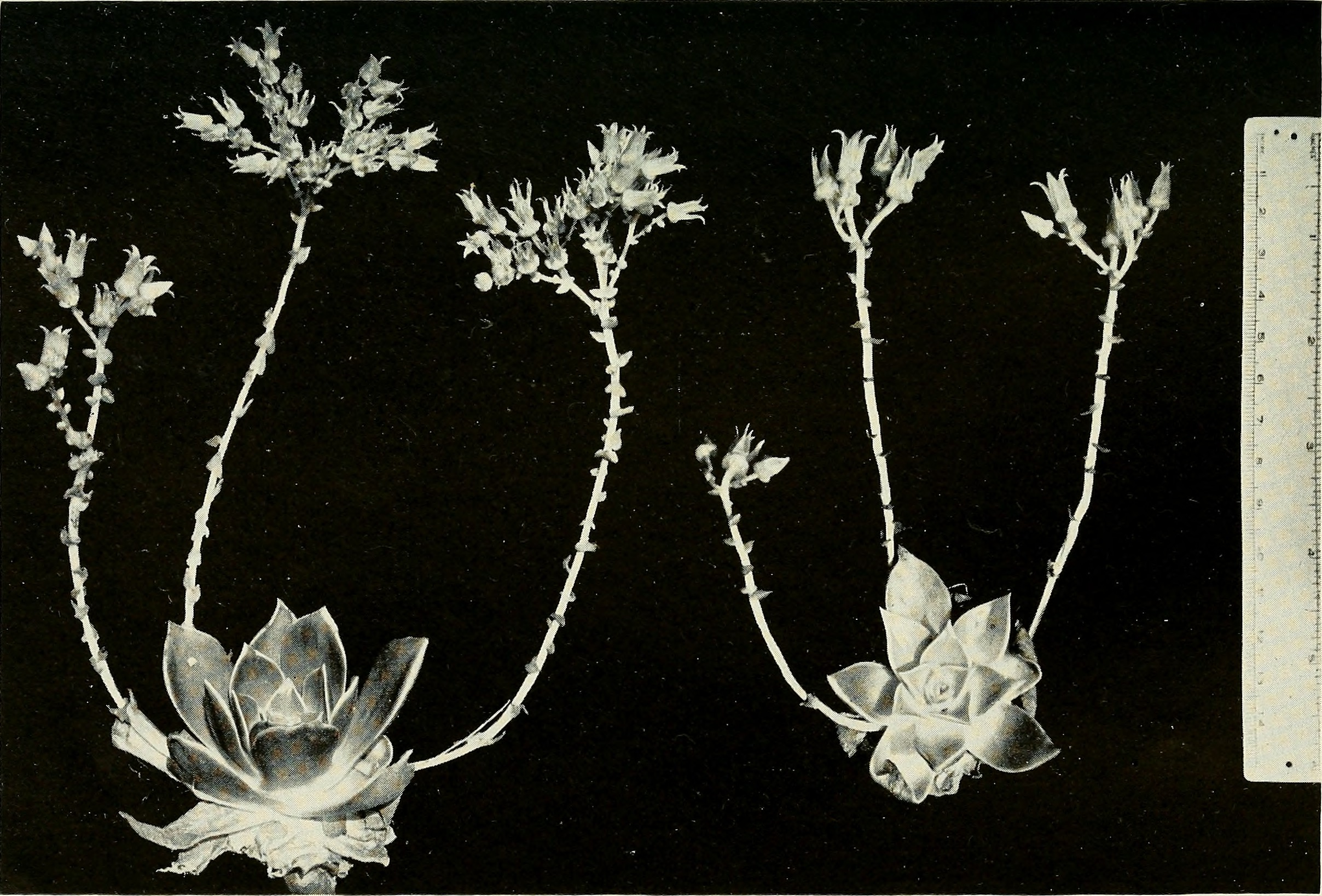
A robust plant on the left and an average plant on the right, from the type description.

This Dudleya grows from an unbranched caudex and is unusual among related plants in that it has stolons from which it sprouts vegetatively. Other species of Dudleya only grow solitary or produce dichotomous branches, unless their terminal meristems are damaged. This species produces a small rosette of pointed reddish-green leaves and erects a short peduncle topped with an inflorescence of bright yellow flowers.

=== Morphology ===
This species grows one to several rosettes on a caudex, with new rosettes emerging from stolons that grow laterally outwards. The caudex is usually 1.5–3 cm (0.59–1.18 in) wide. Each of the rosettes may be 1–10 cm (0.39–3.94 in) wide, and have 15 to 30 leaves. The leaves are evergreen, not glaucous, and colored a lime-green, tinged maroon on the lower surface. The leaves are shaped oblong-obovate, with the tip short-acuminate to mucronate. The leaf blades measure 3–7 cm (1.2–2.8 in) long, 1.5–3 cm (0.59–1.18 in) wide, and 3–4 mm (0.12–0.16 in) thick, with the base of the leaf 1–2 cm (0.39–0.79 in) wide.

The peduncle is 2–25 cm (0.79–9.84 in) tall, and 1–4 mm (0.039–0.157 in) wide. The peduncle is covered in 15 to 25 spreading bracts, which are shaped cordate-ovate, and are 8–13 mm (0.31–0.51 in) by 5–7 mm (0.20–0.28 in) wide. The inflorescence is an ascending cyme, which is simple or 1 to 2 branched. The branches may subsequently be simply or 1 times bifurcate, and give way to the cincinni, or terminal branches. The terminal branches are circinate, unfurling like a fern's frond, and have 3 to 9 flowers on them. The flowers are suspended on pedicels 5–8 mm (0.20–0.31 in) long.

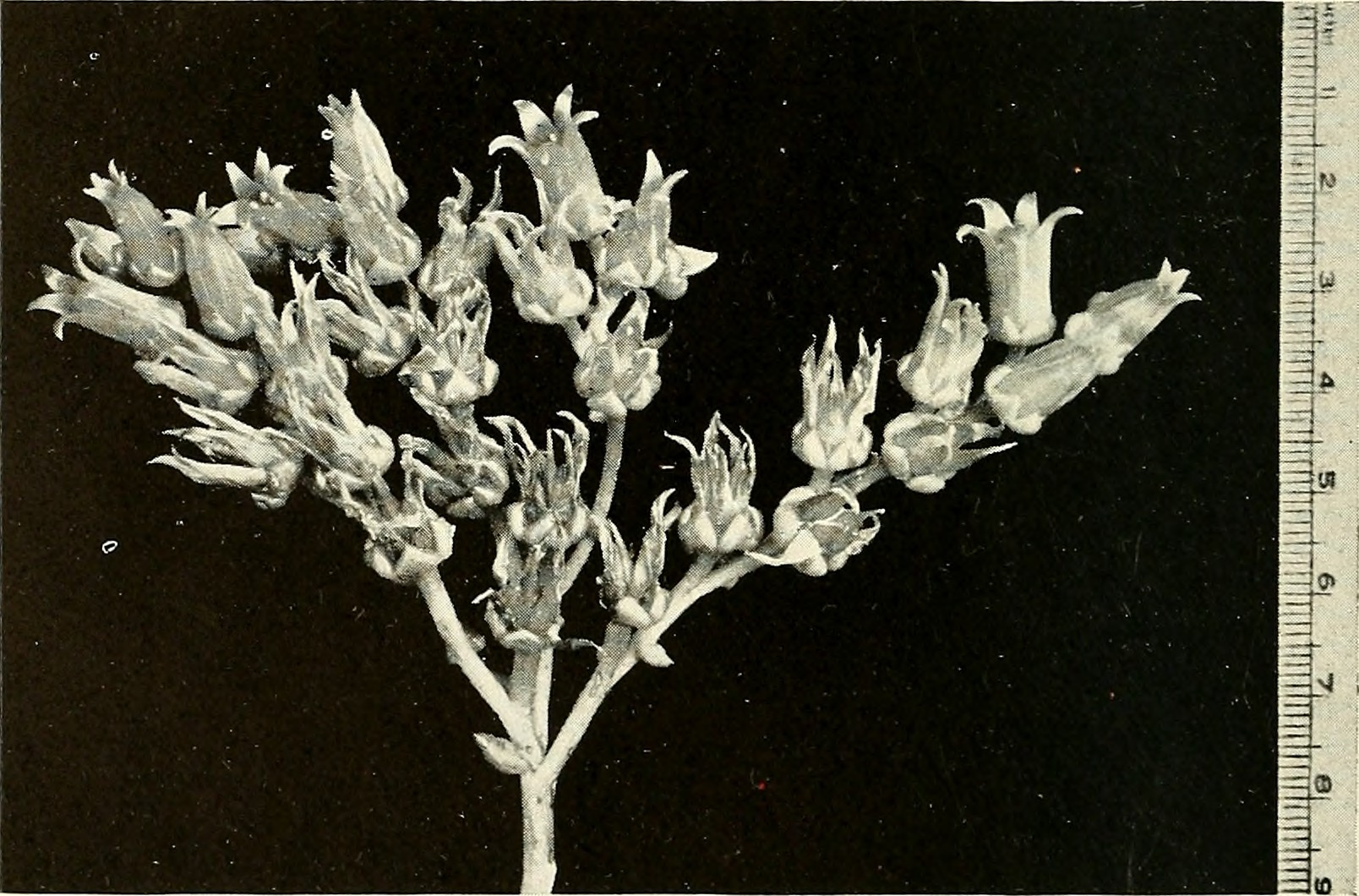
The inflorescence, from the type description.

The sepals on the flower are 2–3 mm (0.079–0.118 in) long, shaped deltate, and are wider than they are long. The petals are 10–11 mm (0.39–0.43 in) long and 3–3.5 mm (0.12–0.14 in), fused (connate) 1–2 mm (0.039–0.079 in). The petals are shaped elliptic, with outcurved, acute tips, and colored a bright yellow. The pistils are not connivent, and are suberect. The fruit is ascending.

The plant flowers from May to July.

== Taxonomy ==
This species was treated as Echeveria caespitosa (Dudleya caespitosa) by Philip A. Munz in his Manual of Southern California Botany. The plants identified as D. caespitosa, which is native to the Central Coast of California, differ greatly from Dudleya stolonifera, as D. caespitosa is dichotomously branching, has an elongate caudex, longer, narrow, and thicker leaves, a larger, taller, and more complex inflorescence, and erect fruits.

Botanist Reid Moran, who specialized in Dudleya, wrote the type description for Dudleya stolonifera in 1949, based on the obvious discrepancy between the plants in Orange County and their assignment to E. caespitosa. He also notes that Munz placed another species, Dudleya ovatifolia, from the Santa Monica Mountains, under Echeveria caespitosa. This species, actually Dudleya cymosa subsp. ovatifolia, shares similar characteristics to D. stolonifera, including the maroon suffusion on the underside of the leaves, the similar size and shape of the leaves, the bright yellow petals, and the short floral stems. Although Moran notes that this resemblance may be only superficial, he states that no other species of Dudleya more closely approaches D. stolonifera.

=== Hybridization and classification ===
Dudleya edulis, another member of the genus, occurs sympatrically within the range of D. stolonifera. D. edulis is the type species of subgenus Stylophyllum, whose name refers to the pencil-shaped leaves of D. edulis and its allies. Species in this subgenus, in addition to having thin, narrow leaves, also have spreading flowers, as opposed to the tubular, connate flowers as seen in other species (like Dudleya pulverulenta, for example). This difference between the spreading of the flowers was used by Moran as a diagnostic characteristic to separate the subgenera.

Moran noted that Dudleya stolonifera was unusual because the flowers appear connate in bloom, but the carpels (female organs) are somewhat spreading, like in a Stylophyllum, instead of being connate like the flower in other similar Dudleya. Moran suggested that on this basis, D. stolonifera could be placed into Stylophyllum, as the attitude of the carpels was previously regarded as an important diagnostic characteristic. But with the broad rosette leaves and erect bright yellow petals resembling a typical Dudleya, Moran tentatively placed it in the subgenus Dudleya.

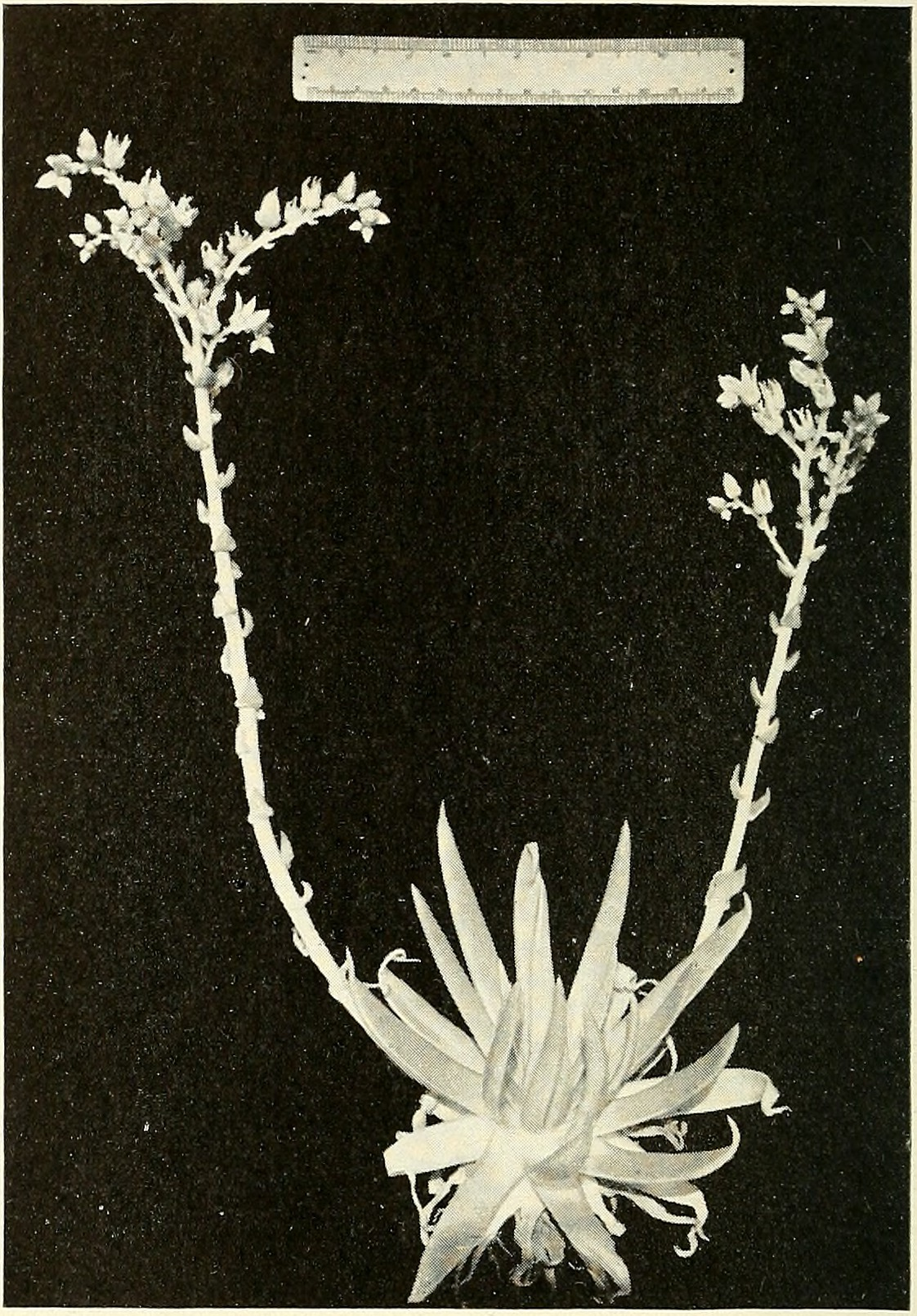
The hybrid with Dudleya edulis, from the type description's article.

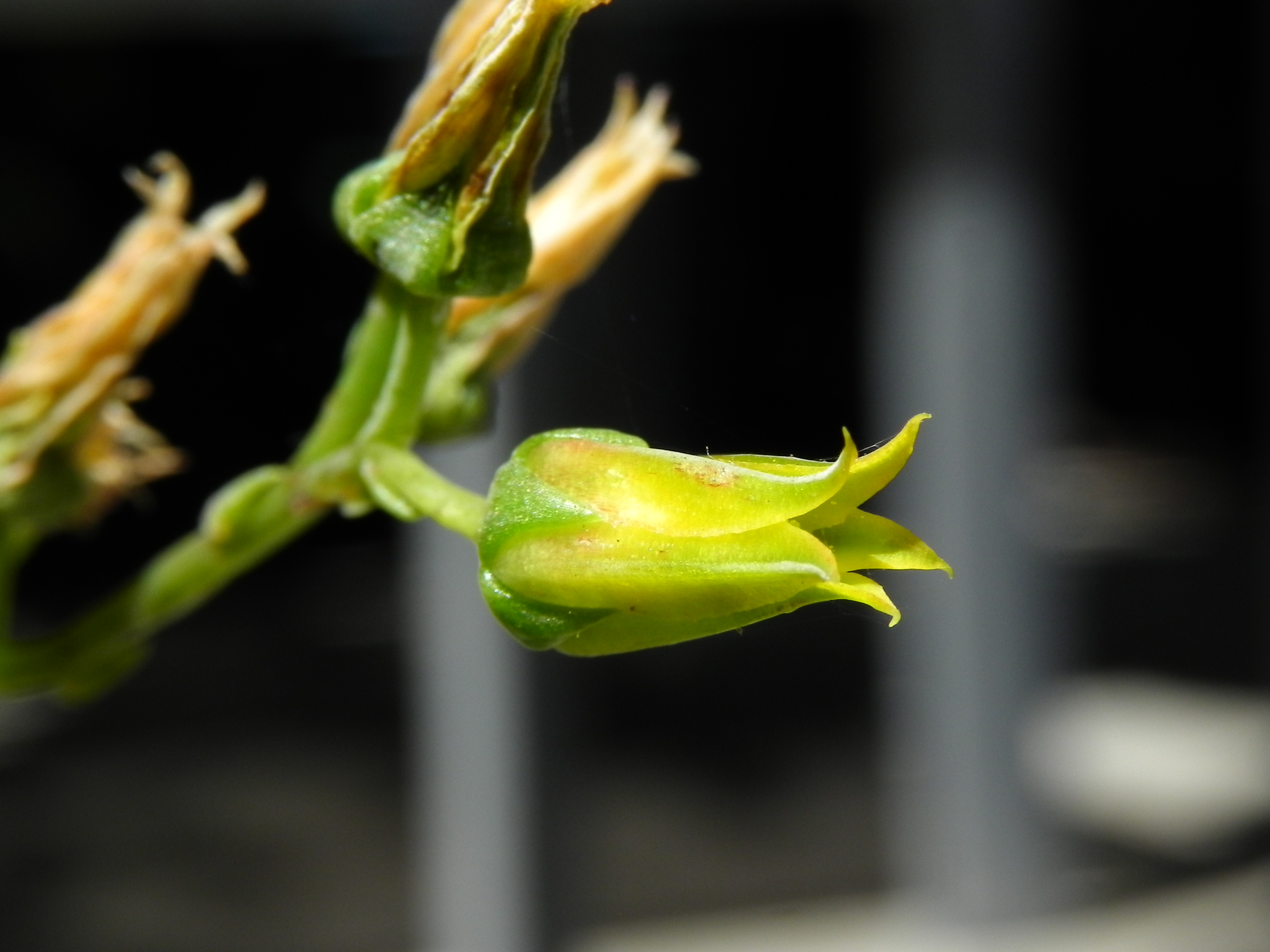
In addition to hybridizing with Dudleya edulis, this species also hybridizes with Dudleya lanceolata. Pictured is the flower of a hybrid.

In addition to the Stylophyllum-like trait of the spreading carpels, D. stolonifera appears to readily hybridize with Dudleya edulis and produce fertile offspring. The hybrids branch dichotomously, have linear leaves, pale yellow petals, and flowers that are ascending at the tips but connate towards the base. Moran suggested that the interbreeding could imply a close relationship between the two species, but at the time, he noted there was little evidence available detailing crossability in Dudleya (it would later be revealed that most species of Dudleya could readily hybridize with each other). Less often it hybridizes with Dudleya lanceolata.

The hybrid plant Moran described in his type description was collected growing with the plant of the type specimen of D. stolonifera, in Aliso Canyon. Also growing at the locality were secondary hybrid types, likely results of backcrossing. The secondary hybrids did not show random recombination of characters, but rather, were intermediate between the primary hybrids and the two parental species.

== Distribution and habitat ==
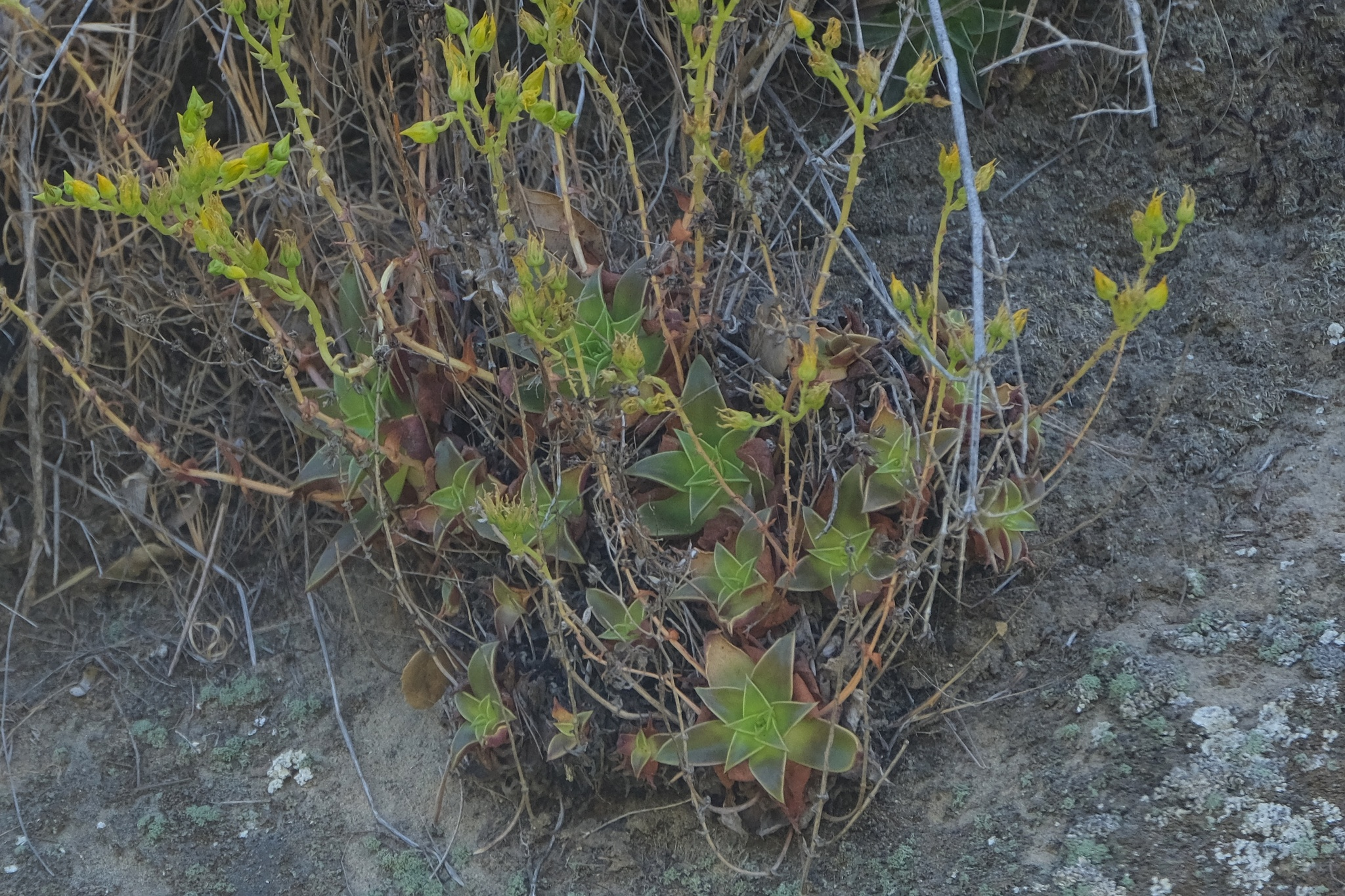
The plants flowering in habitat.

This species is only distributed in Orange County, California, where it is endemic to cliffs in the San Joaquin Hills. It is only found in about six locations, which include Aliso Canyon, Laguna Laurel Canyon, and Mathis Canyon. Occurrences in the easily-accessible areas of Aliso Canyon, where plants were once collected, were extirpated by development, with the destruction of that population occurring prior to listing of the species.

Dudleya stolonifera grows on steep, middle Miocene sandstone cliffs, mostly in coastal sage scrub habitat, and sometimes in chaparral. The cliffs are so steep they may be vertical or overhanging. The plant is only found on the north-facing cliffs. It grows in very thin soils that support very few types of plants; the dudleya is usually found among only mosses and lichens, and sometimes the fern California polypody (Polypodium californicum). It may have an association with the lichen Niebla ceruchoides, which might act as a bed for the seeds of the dudleya when they fall to the ground.

== Conservation ==
This rare plant faces a number of threats to its survival. The effects of urban development may harm the plant. The habitat is too rugged in most areas to be directly developed, but associated changes to the habitat from nearby development may include the edge effect. When the plant was listed as threatened it was plucked from the wild by plant collectors; this is no longer thought to be a serious problem because the occurrences are too difficult for people to access. Grazing and trampling by livestock had a negative effect on the plant but grazing has been stopped in the area, causing the plant to rebound. Climate change is considered a threat today. Because the populations are few and small the plant may be extirpated by any major local event, such as wildfire, or by processes such as inbreeding depression.

Competition with other plants, especially non-native species, threatens the Dudleya. In one area it is being displaced by invading Aeonium haworthii.

== See also ==
- Dudleya cymosa subsp. ovatifolia
- Dudleya cymosa subsp. marcescens
- Dudleya multicaulis
