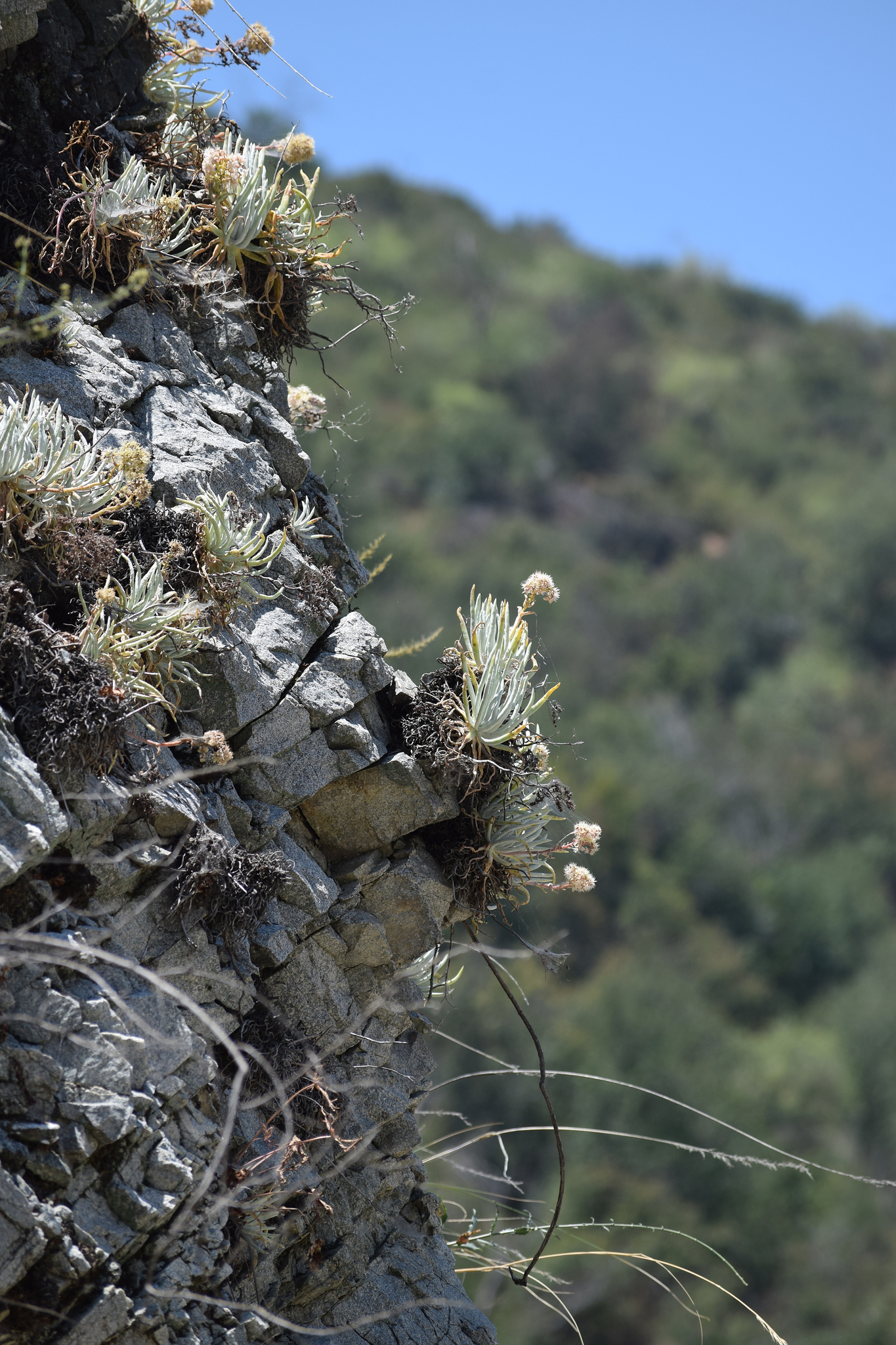
- Plants on a cliff, with flowering inflorescences

Conservation status
- Imperiled (NatureServe)

Scientific classification
- Kingdom: Plantae
- Clade: Tracheophytes
- Clade: Angiosperms
- Clade: Eudicots
- Order: Saxifragales
- Family: Crassulaceae
- Genus: Dudleya
- Species: D. densiflora

Binomial name
- Dudleya densiflora (Rose) Moran

Synonyms
- Cotyledon densiflora (Rose) Jeps.; Cotyledon nudicaulis Abrams; Dudleya nudicaulis (Munz) Moran; Echeveria densiflora (Rose) A.Berger; Echeveria nudicaulis Munz; Stylophyllum densiflorum Rose; Stylophyllum nudicaule (Munz) Abrams

= Dudleya densiflora =

Species of succulent

Dudleya densiflora is a species of succulent plant in the family Crassulaceae known commonly as the San Gabriel Mountains liveforever or San Gabriel Mountains dudleya. A very rare plant confined to the San Gabriel Mountains of Los Angeles County, California, it is known only from three to five spots in the mountain range, with an estimated 1,700 individual plants remaining. Growing in the cracks of the granite slopes of three canyons in this single mountain range, it is threatened by human activity such as rock quarrying and off-trail recreation.

== Description ==
A clumping plant with long, pencil-shaped and powdery leaves, with a branching, rounded inflorescence that holds spreading, white to pink flowers. The flowers emerge from spring to June. It is similar in appearance to Dudleya edulis and Dudleya viscida, but differs in having white powdery leaves and a rounded, not flat-topped, inflorescence.

=== Morphology ===
This plant grows in a caespitose or clumping habit, with multiple rosettes of leaves forming on top of branching caudices. The caudex is 1–2.5 cm (0.39–0.98 in) wide. The clumps of rosettes may reach up to 30 cm (12 in) in diameter, and have a foliage consisting of 20 to 40 leaves. The evergreen foliage is covered in a white, waxy powder, known as an epicuticular wax, with the leaf blades green underneath the substance. The base of the leaf may turn a yellow when the leaf is wounded. Each leaf is 6–15 cm (2.4–5.9 in) long by 6–12 mm (0.24–0.47 in) wide, more or less cylindric, with a linear shape. The tip of the leaf is shaped acute.

The peduncle is 10–30 cm (3.9–11.8 in) tall, and 2–6 mm (0.079–0.236 in) wide. The floral shoots are covered in 5 to 15 bracts, which are erect and shaped lanceolate. The inflorescence branches 3 to several times, with each branch sometimes dividing into one or two more terminal branches. The terminal branches are 2–4 cm (0.79–1.57 in) long and bear 2 to 8 flowers, suspended on pedicels 2–5 mm (0.079–0.197 in) long. The flowers are spreading from the middle, the sepals shaped deltate to ovate. The petals are 5–10 mm (0.20–0.39 in) long, with a narrowly ovate shape, and are colored a white or pink. The entire corolla is around 12–20 mm (0.47–0.79 in) in diameter.

== Distribution and habitat ==
This species is restricted to a small locality in southern California, in the United States. It is found growing at the southern base of the San Gabriel Mountains, in an area near the mouth of San Gabriel Canyon and Fish Canyon. The habitat of this species consists of sheer rock faces, cliffs, and canyon walls, usually composed of granitic rock.

Dudleya densiflora is threatened by human activity encroaching on its habitat. A notable disturbance is the presence of a granite quarry operating for the community of Azusa, with the permit for the quarry issued in 1956, before most environmental laws existed. The quarry also blocks the entrance to Fish Canyon, which was formerly accessible as a trail maintained by the Forest Service. In Fish Canyon, this species can also be found growing with another Dudleya endemic to the locality, Dudleya cymosa subsp. crebrifolia.

== Gallery ==
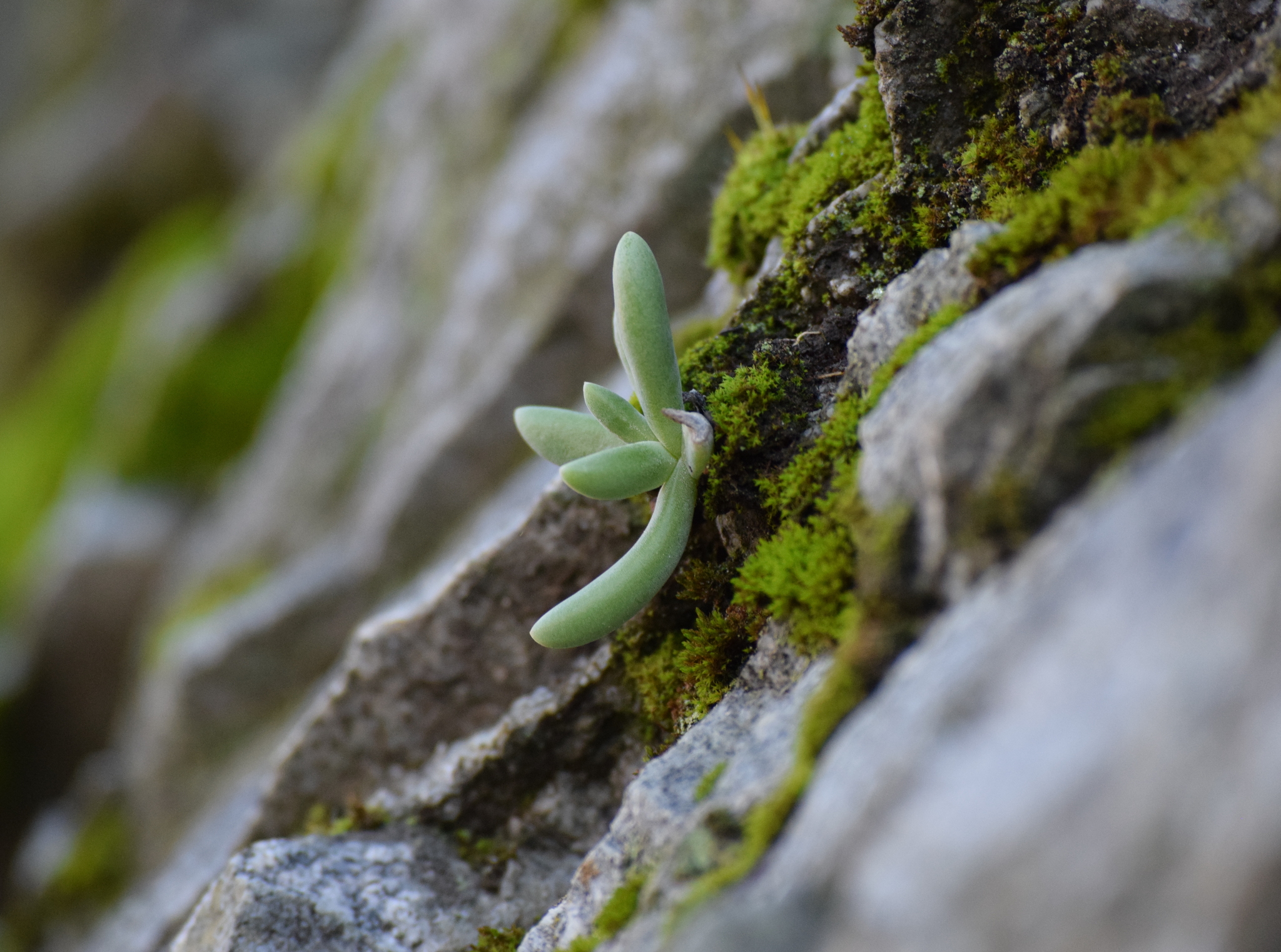
A young plant growing on a rocky face

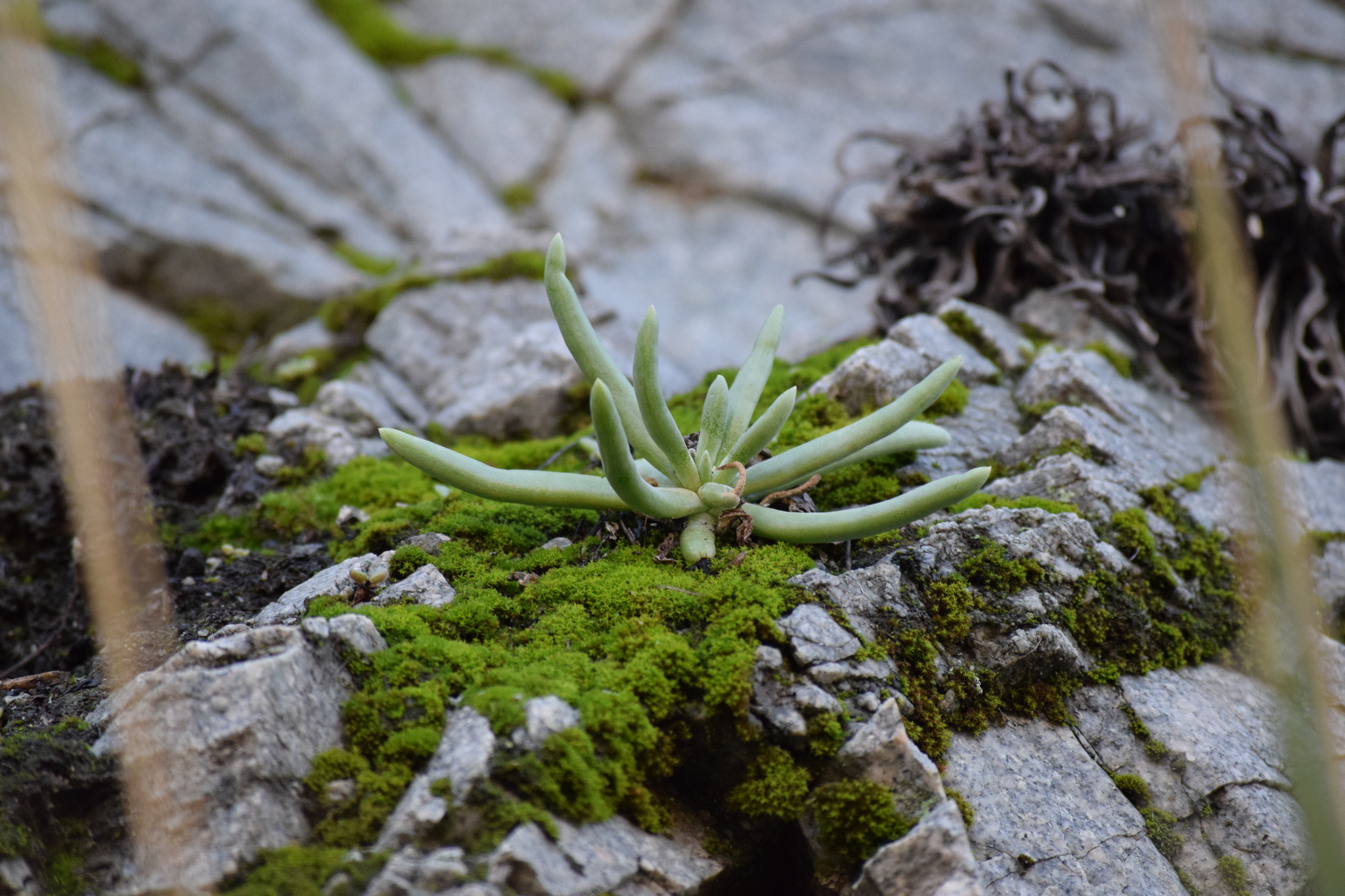
A plant with a single rosette, growing on moss

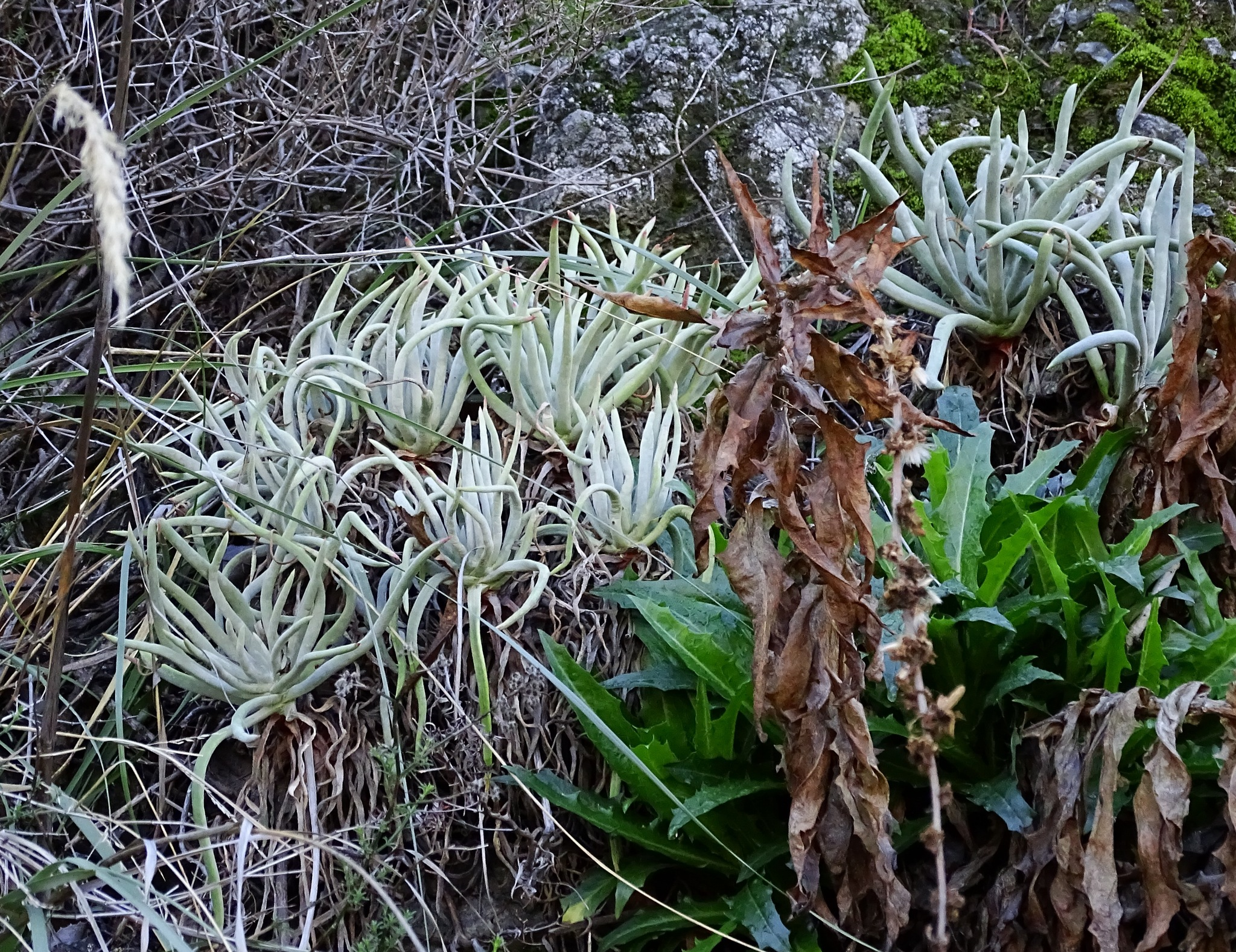
A large clump of a plant

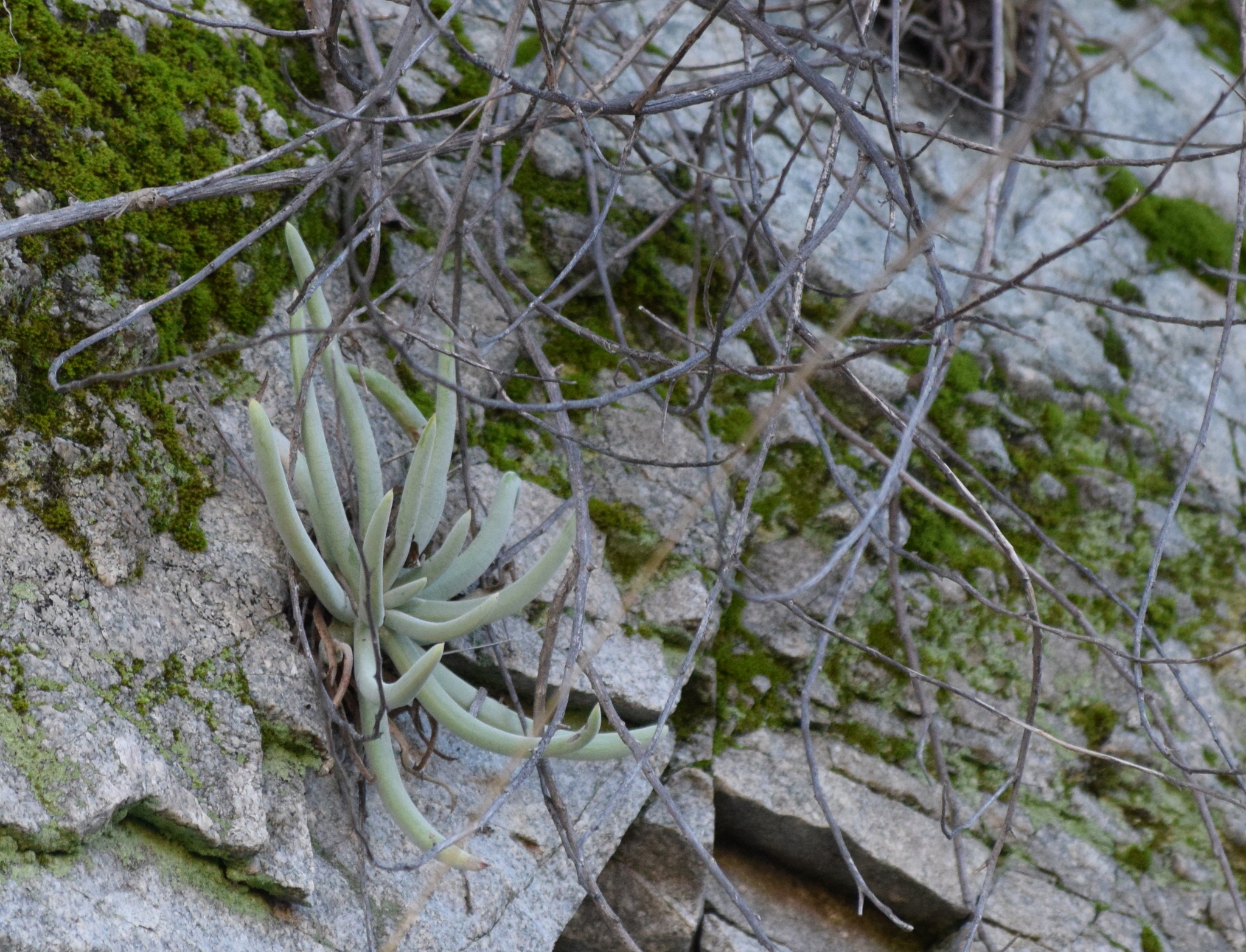
Growing out of a cliff face

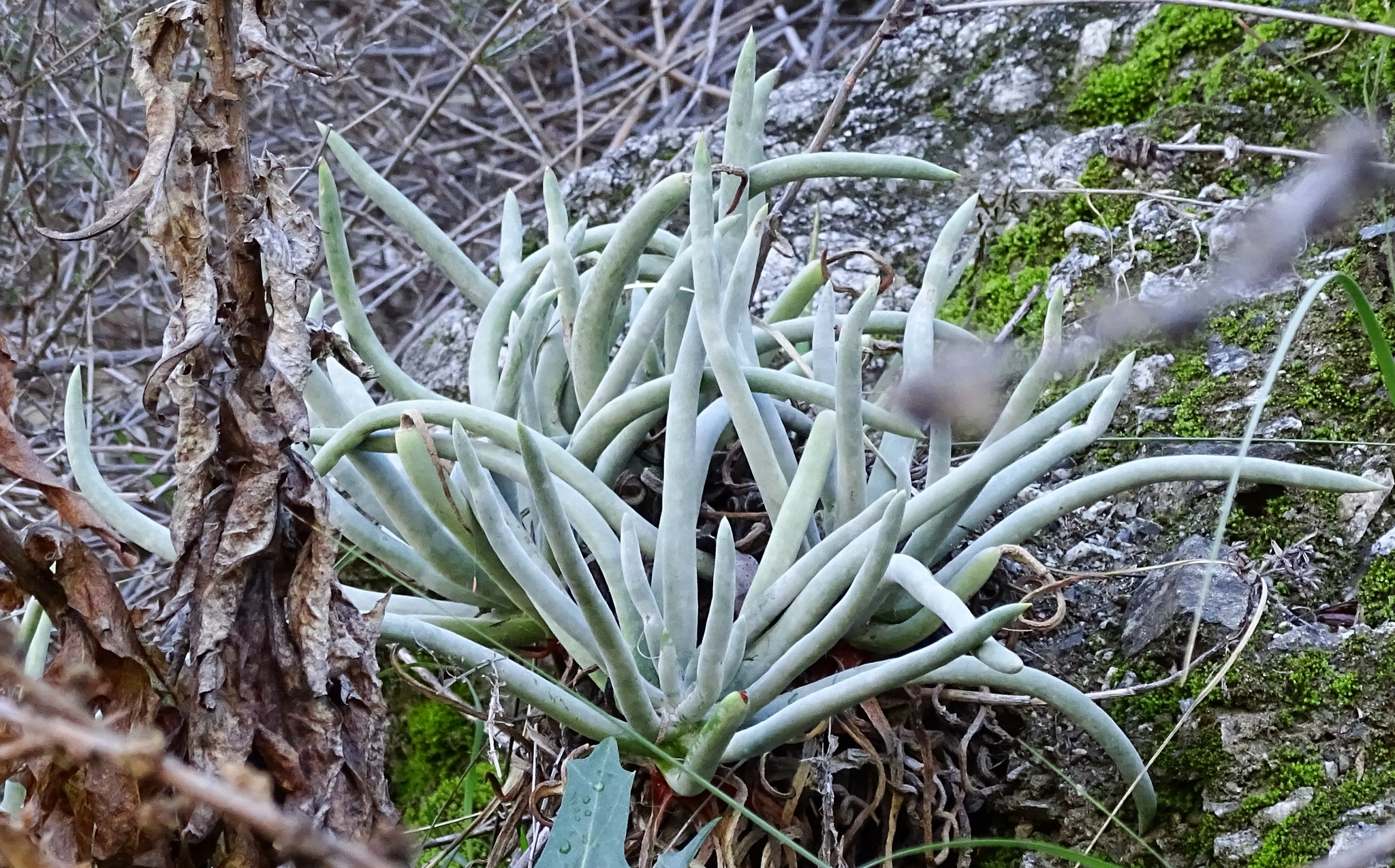
Growing in habitat
