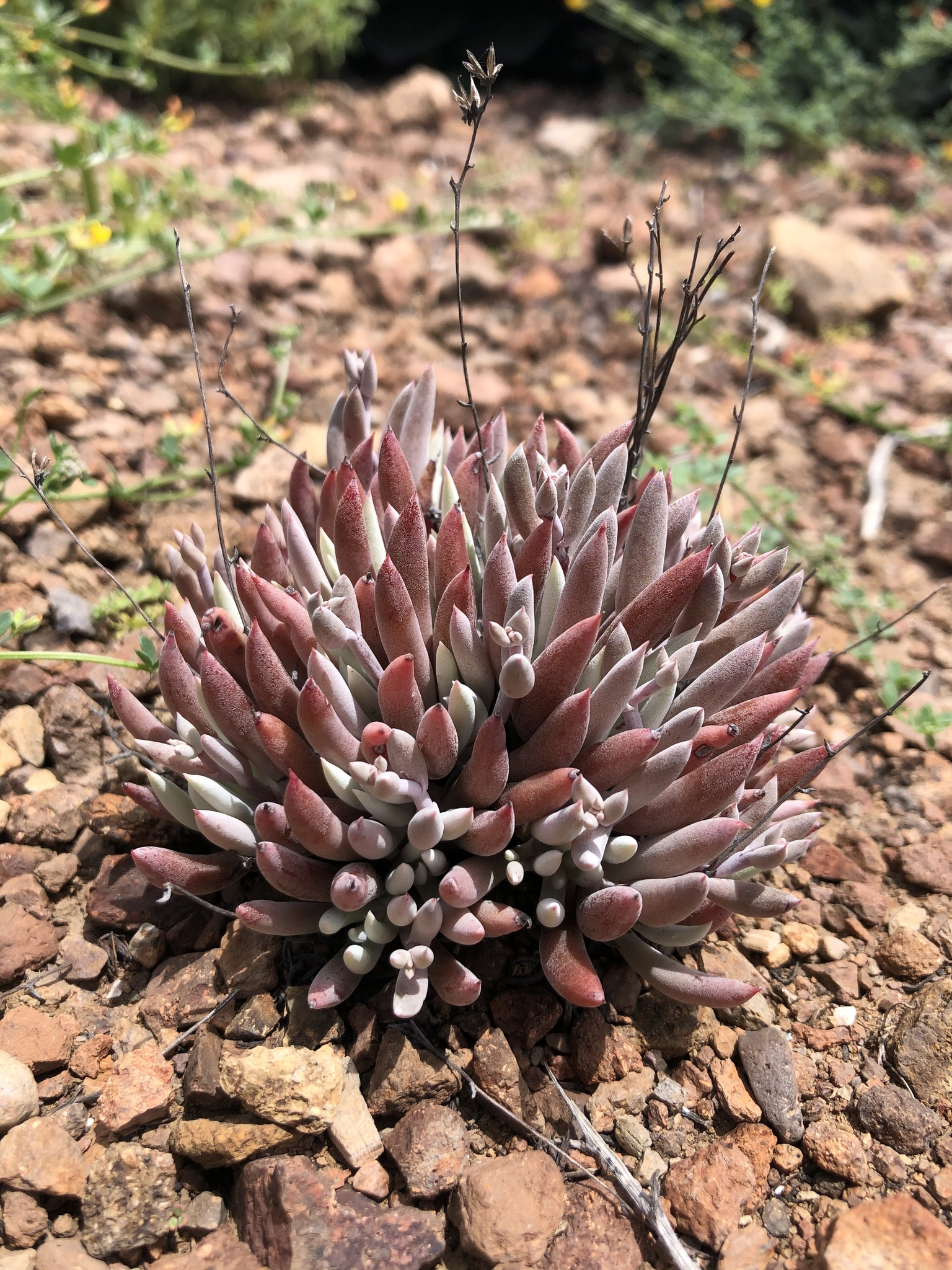

Conservation status
- Apparently Secure (NatureServe)

Scientific classification
- Kingdom: Plantae
- Clade: Tracheophytes
- Clade: Angiosperms
- Clade: Eudicots
- Order: Saxifragales
- Family: Crassulaceae
- Genus: Dudleya
- Species: D. attenuata

Binomial name
- Dudleya attenuata (S. Watson) Moran
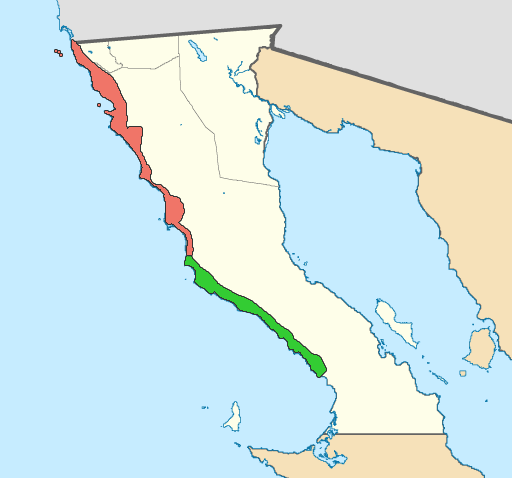
- Distribution of Dudleya attenuata subsp. attenuata (red) and Dudleya attenuata subsp. australis (green)

Synonyms
- Cotyledon attenuata S. Watson; Cotyledon edulis var. attenuata (S. Watson) Jeps.; Echeveria attenuata (S. Watson) A. Berger; Echeveria edulis var. attenuata (S. Watson) Jeps.; Stylophyllum attenuatum (S. Watson) Britton & Rose

= Dudleya attenuata =

Species of succulent

Dudleya attenuata is a species of perennial succulent plant known by the common name taper-tip liveforever, native to Baja California and a small portion of California. It is a rosette-forming leaf succulent which has narrow pencil-shaped leaves that can often be found covered in a white epicuticular wax. The thin, sprawling stems branch to form the clusters of rosettes, with plants creating a "clump" up to 40 cm wide. The small flowers are white or yellow, with 5 spreading petals. It is a diverse, variable species that extends from the southernmost coast of San Diego County to an area slightly north of the Vizcaino Desert, hybridizing with many other species of Dudleya in its range. Some plants with white or pinkish flowers were referred to as Orcutt's liveforever, referring to a former subspecies split on the basis of the flower color.

== Description ==
Because this is a very diverse and polymorphic species, this description serves as a generalization of the common features. See the taxonomy section for descriptions on the morphology of each subspecies.

The caudex is erect to sprawling, 3 to 15 mm thick, growing up to 30 cm long or more, branching to form clumps 10 to 40 cm wide, often covered in dried leaves. Rosettes are 2 to 5 cm wide, of 5 to 20 erect leaves. Leaves are farinose, linear to linear-oblanceolate, acute, terete, 2 to 10 cm long, 2 to 5 mm wide, with the base lenticular to suborbicular or oval 5 to 15 mm wide, 2 to 4 mm high, but sometimes higher than wide.

Peduncles are 5 to 30 cm tall, 1 to 3 mm thick, leafy to within 1 to 4 cm of the base. The 5 to 15 bracts on the stem are ascending, linear-lanceolate to deltate-ovate, acute, with the lowermost 0.5 to 8 cm long and 2 to 5 mm wide. Higher on the inflorescence, it is composed of 1 to 3 simple branches 2 to 15 cm long, with 3 to 15 erect flowers mounted on pedicels 0.5 to 3 mm long.

On the flower, the calyx is 3 to 6 mm wide, 2 to 5 mm high, segmented into deltate-ovate sepals with an acute tip, 1.5 to 4 mm long, 1 to 2 mm wide. The corolla is cream, white or pinkish, with the keel finely marked in red. Petals are 5 to 11 mm long, 1.5 to 4 mm wide. Concerning the stamens, filaments are 3.5 to 11 mm long, and the anthers are red to yellow, 1 to 2 mm long. Seeds are reddish brown, 0.7 to 1 mm long.

Plants are diploid, typically with n = 17 chromosomes.

== Taxonomy ==
=== Subdivisions ===
- Dudleya attenuata subsp. attenuata — Occurs in northern Baja California, with a small population in San Diego County in the Border Field State Park. The southern range of the diploid subspecies ends near El Rosario. A form occurs on the Punta Banda in Ensenada that is identical to a typical ssp. attenuata, but phylogenetic analysis has revealed that it is not sister to D. attenuata, instead being basal to Dudleya formosa and Dudleya edulis. This form is diploid or tetraploid, with 17 or 34 chromosomes. A second cytological form occurs near and around the coast of El Rosario, almost identical in appearance with a typical ssp. attenuata plant. The petals tends to be slightly longer than in diploids and floral parts slightly larger. This form is a tetraploid with 34 chromosomes, as opposed to 17.
- Dudleya attenuata subsp. australis — Caudex 4 to 8 mm thick. On the inflorescence, the pedicels are 2 to 12 mm long. On the flower, the corolla is white, but with some markings of red on the keel. Petals are 7 to 11 mm long, 3 to 4 mm wide. Subspecies australis is distinguished by its octoploid chromosome count. Chromosomes n = 68. Occurs along the coast of Baja California, from 50 miles south of El Rosario to near the village of Santa Rosaliíta.

=== Hybrids ===
This species hybridizes widely across its range. Parents of hybrids with Dudleya attenuata subsp. attenuata include D. candida, D. edulis, D. formosa, D. ingens, and D. variegata. A recurrent hybrid, known as D. × semiteres, is somewhat common compared to other crosses. The southern subspecies, Dudleya attenuata subsp. australis, is found hybridizing where Dudleya albiflora meets it in the south near Puerto Faro San José.

- Dudleya × semiteres (Rose) Moran — Occurs along the Pacific coast just north of Ensenada and on South Coronado & South Todos Santos islands. Caudex 1 to 3 cm thick, up to 15 cm high, branching to form clumps of 10 to 15 rosettes. Rosettes are 3 to 10 cm wide, of 15 to 30 ascending leaves. Leaves are green or glaucous, tapering uniformly with the sides roughly parallel in the bottom half. The leaves have a flattish or slightly convex ventral surface, and a convex dorsal surface, with the margins acute in the lower quarter of the plant but rounded towards the tip. Leaves are 3 to 10 cm long, 6 to 15 mm wide, and 3 to 6 mm thick. Peduncle is 10 to 30 cm tall, 3 to 8 mm thick. Bracts are deltate-lanceolate, acute, with the lowermost 1 to 3 cm long, 3 to 7 mm wide. The inflorescence is composed of typically 2 to 4 ascending branches, with each branch typically 3 to 10 cm long. 3 to 12 flowers are mounted on the pedicels, of which, the lowermost pedicels are 3 to 8 mm long. On the flower, the calyx is 4 to 5 mm wide, 4 to 6 mm high, segmenting into deltate-ovate to lanceolate sepals that are 3 to 5 mm long and 1.5 to 2 mm wide. Petals are white or cream, often with the keels lined in red, similar to D. a. subsp. attenuata. Petal shape is elliptic-oblong, acute, 8 to 10 mm long, 2 to 3.5 mm wide. The stamens are composed of filaments 5 to 6.5 mms long, with red or yellow anthers 1 to 1.5 mm long. The other presumptive parents of this recurrent hybrid are Dudleya brittonii and D. candida. × semiteres shares the chromosome count with its parents, having a chromosome number of n = 17.

=== Phylogeny ===
The taxonomic status of D. attenuata's subspecies is still under debate. Phylogenetic analysis reveals that although some specimens of D. attenuata from Punta Banda are sister to D. a. subsp. attenuata, other specimens collected are instead basal to D. edulis and D. formosa, illustrating the gene flow where the species overlap.

== Distribution and habitat ==
D. attenuata is nearly endemic to Baja California with the exception of a population north of the border in San Diego County, California, at the Border Field State Park. It is also occurrent offshore on the Coronado Islands and the Isla Todos Santos. It can be found on coastal bluffs, typically below 165 ft.

== Conservation ==
The D. attenuata population in the United States is threatened by Border Patrol activity and trampling.

== Gallery ==
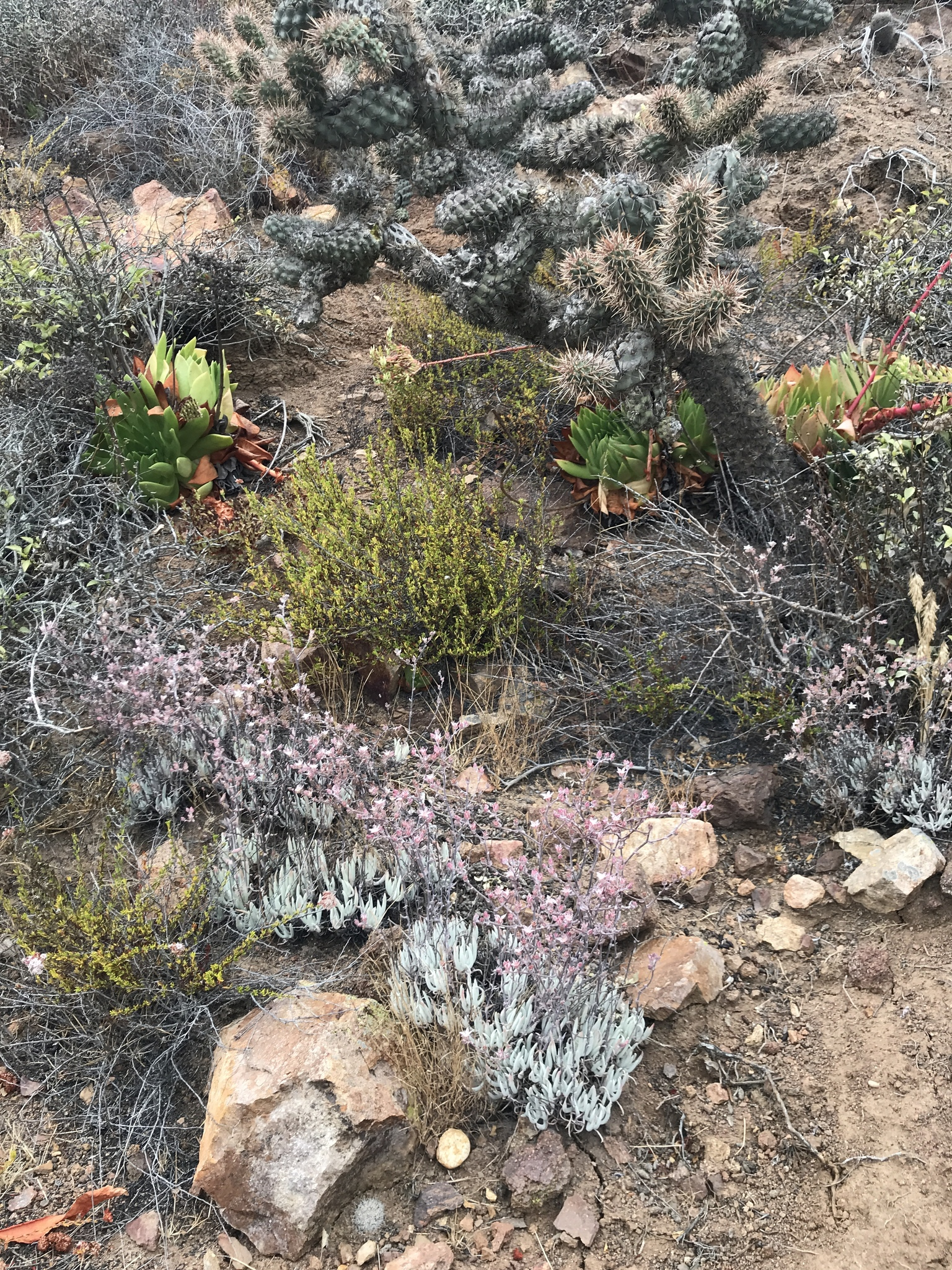
In habitat in Ensenada

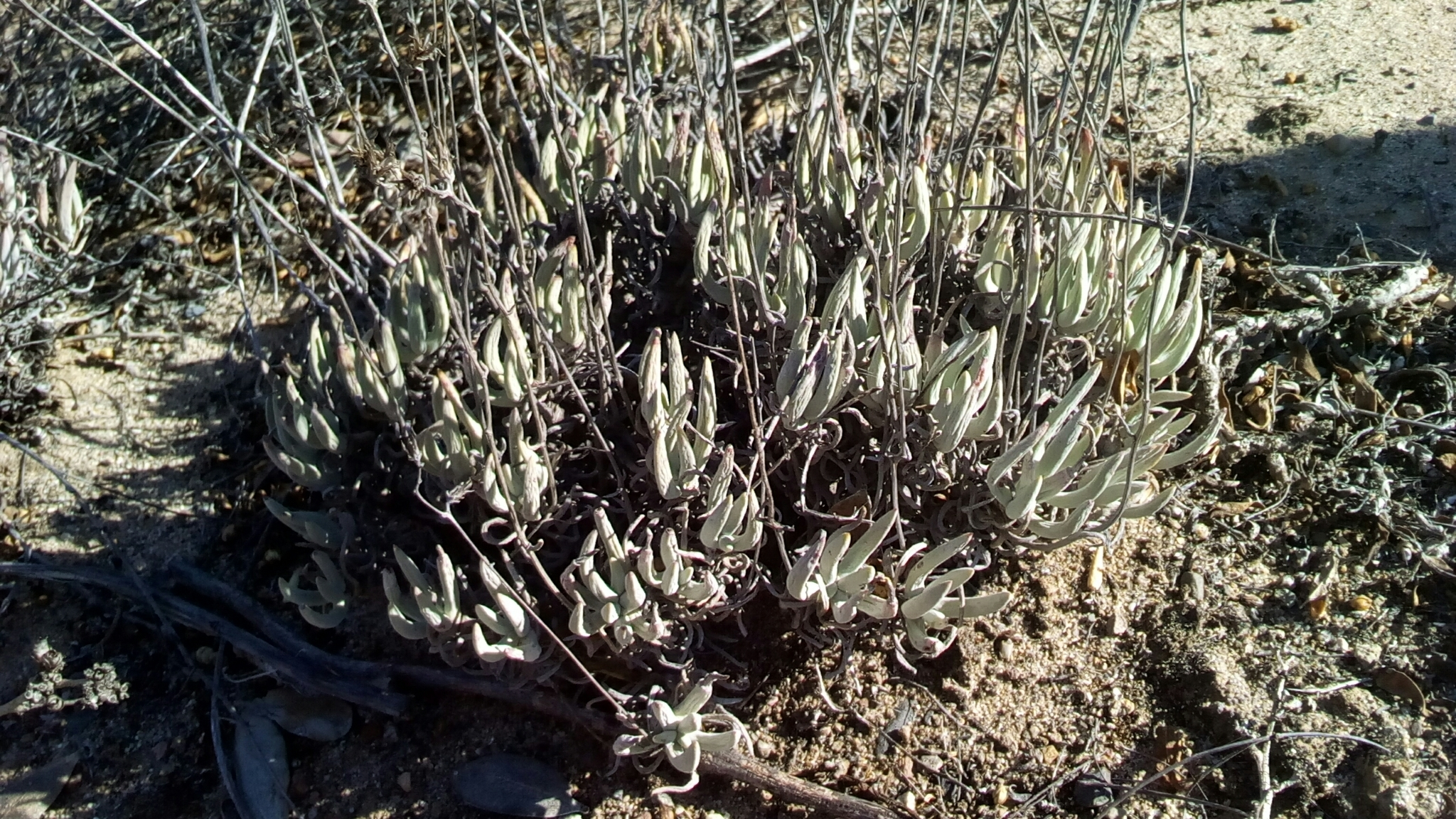
Specimen in El Rosario

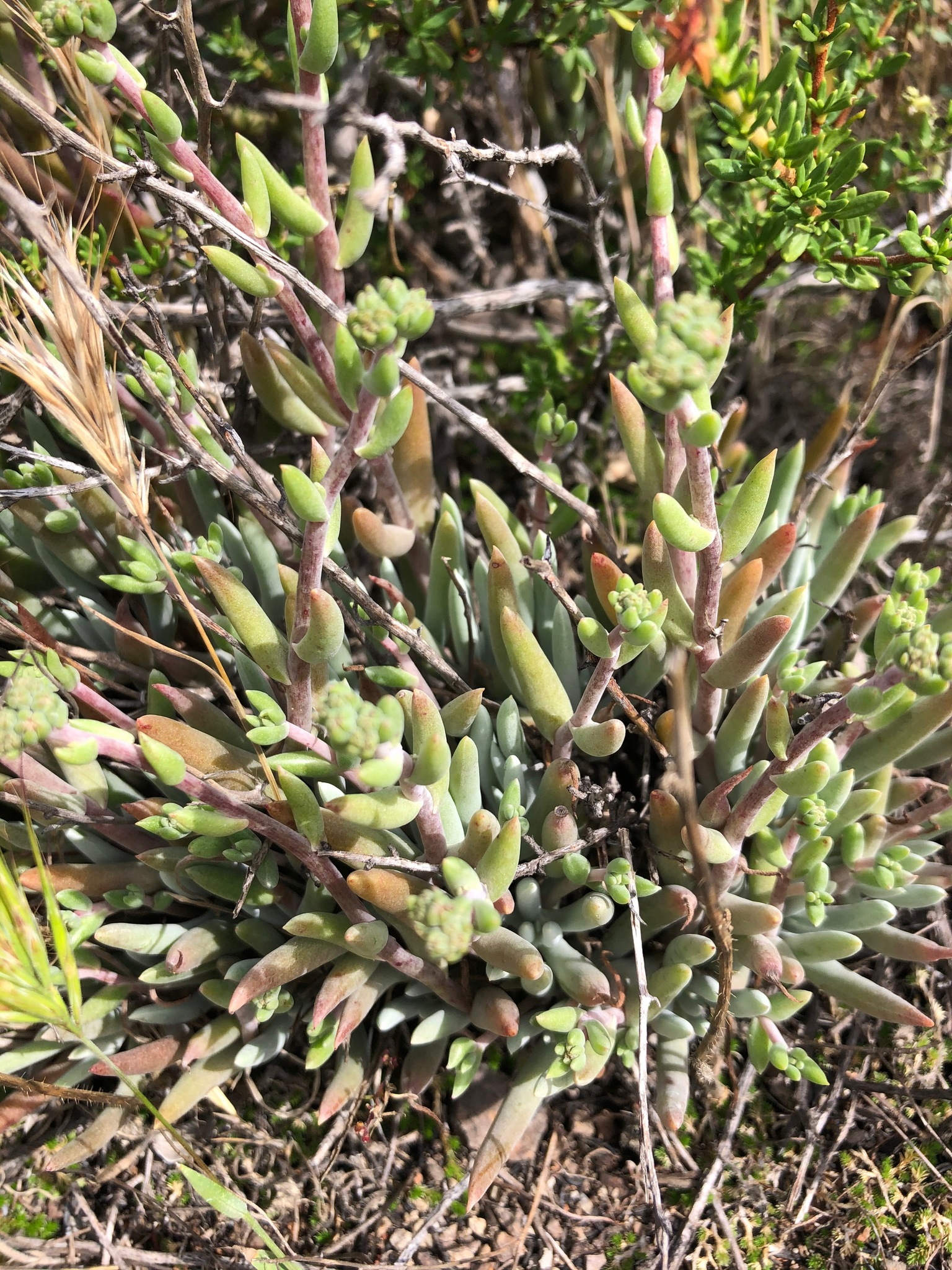
Specimen in Ensenada

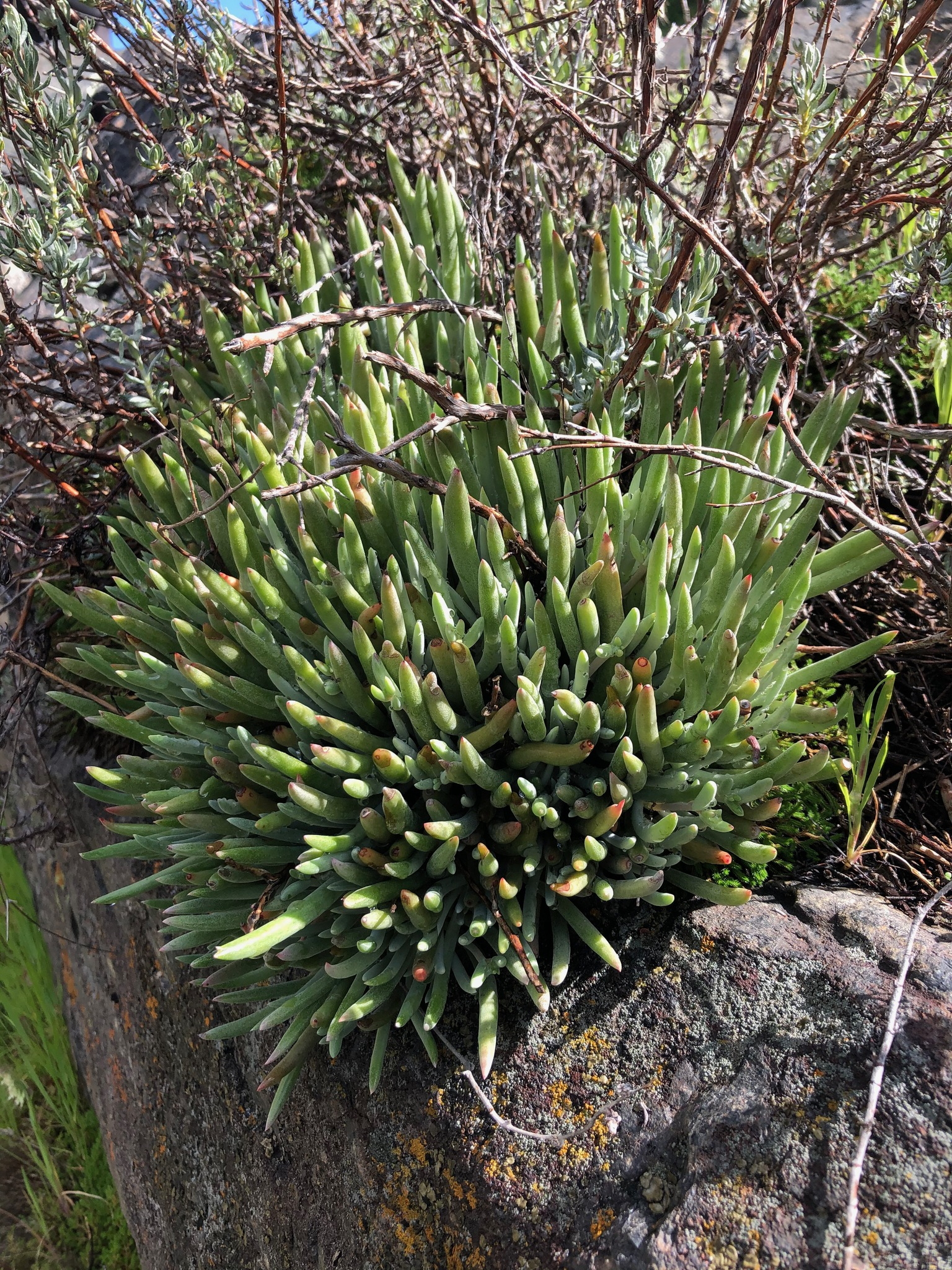
Specimen in Ensenada

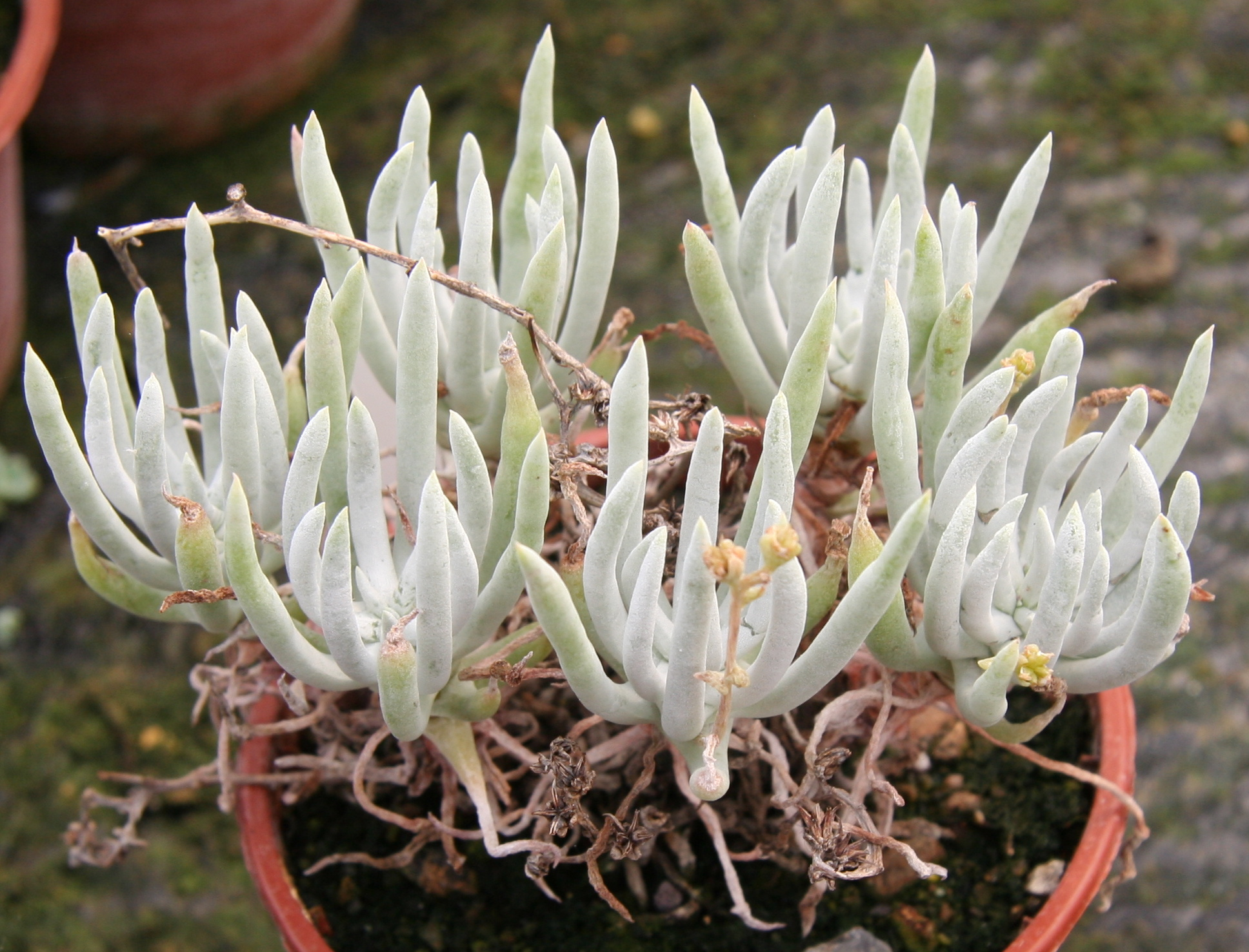
Cultivated plant
