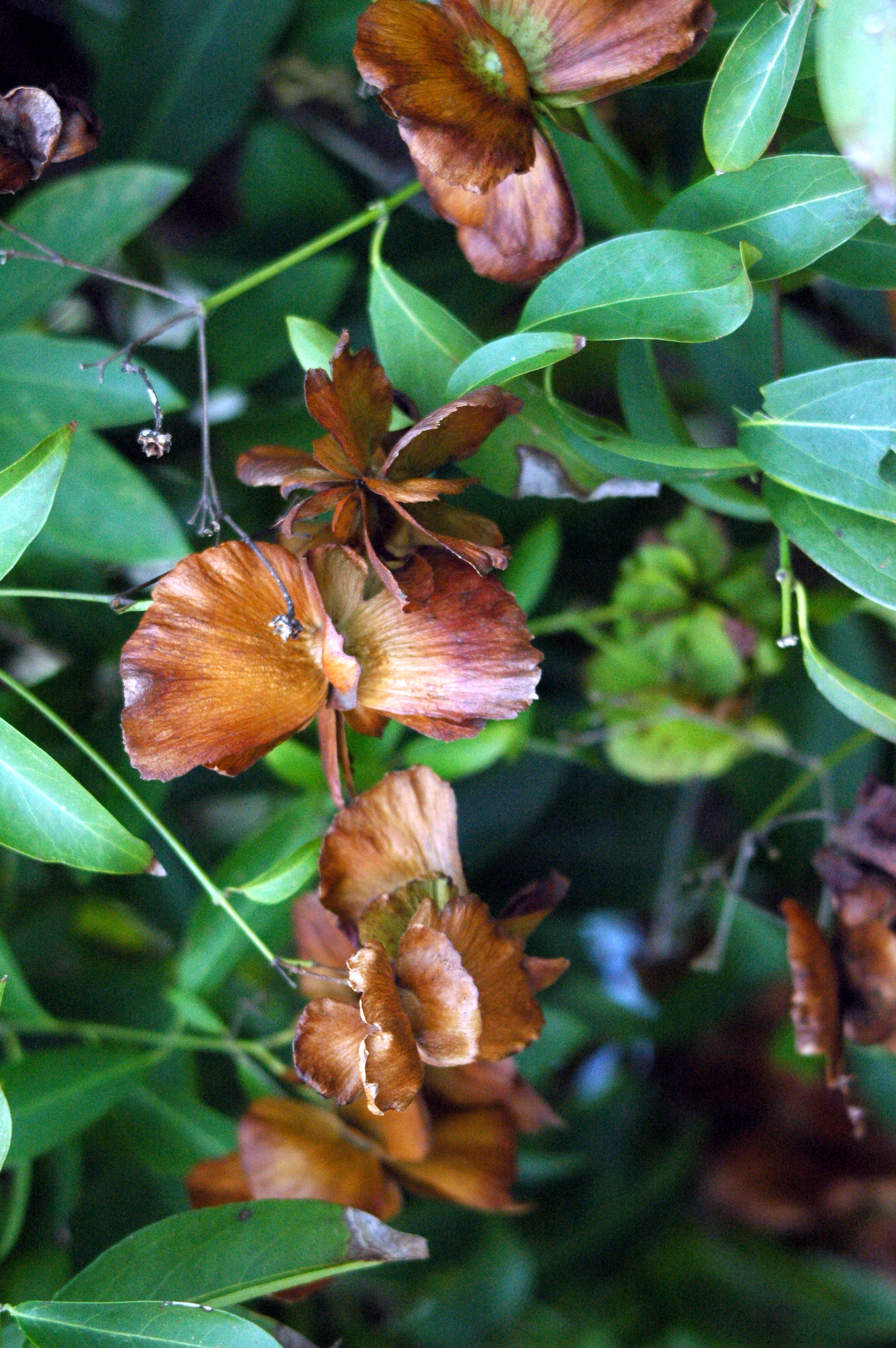
- Callaeum macropterum

Scientific classification
- Kingdom: Plantae
- Clade: Tracheophytes
- Clade: Angiosperms
- Clade: Eudicots
- Clade: Rosids
- Order: Malpighiales
- Family: Malpighiaceae
- Genus: Callaeum; Small

Species
- 11 species; see text

Synonyms
- Cabi Ducke

= Callaeum =

Genus of flowering plants

Callaeum is a genus in the Malpighiaceae, a family of about 75 genera of flowering plants in the order Malpighiales. Callaeum comprises 11 species of woody vines and shrubs occurring from western Texas to Mexico, Central America, and South America. Two species, C. macropterum and C. septentrionale are cultivated as ornamentals in Arizona and California.

== Species ==
- Callaeum antifebrile (Griseb.) D.M.Johnson
- Callaeum chiapense (Lundell) D.M.Johnson
- Callaeum clavipetalum D.M.Johnson
- Callaeum coactum D.M.Johnson
- Callaeum johnsonii W.R.Anderson
- Callaeum macropterum (DC.) D.M.Johnson
- Callaeum malpighioides (Turcz.) D.M.Johnson
- Callaeum nicaraguense (Griseb.) Small
- Callaeum psilophyllum (Adr.Juss.) D.M.Johnson
- Callaeum reticulatum D.M.Johnson
- Callaeum septentrionale (Adr.Juss.) D.M.Johnson
