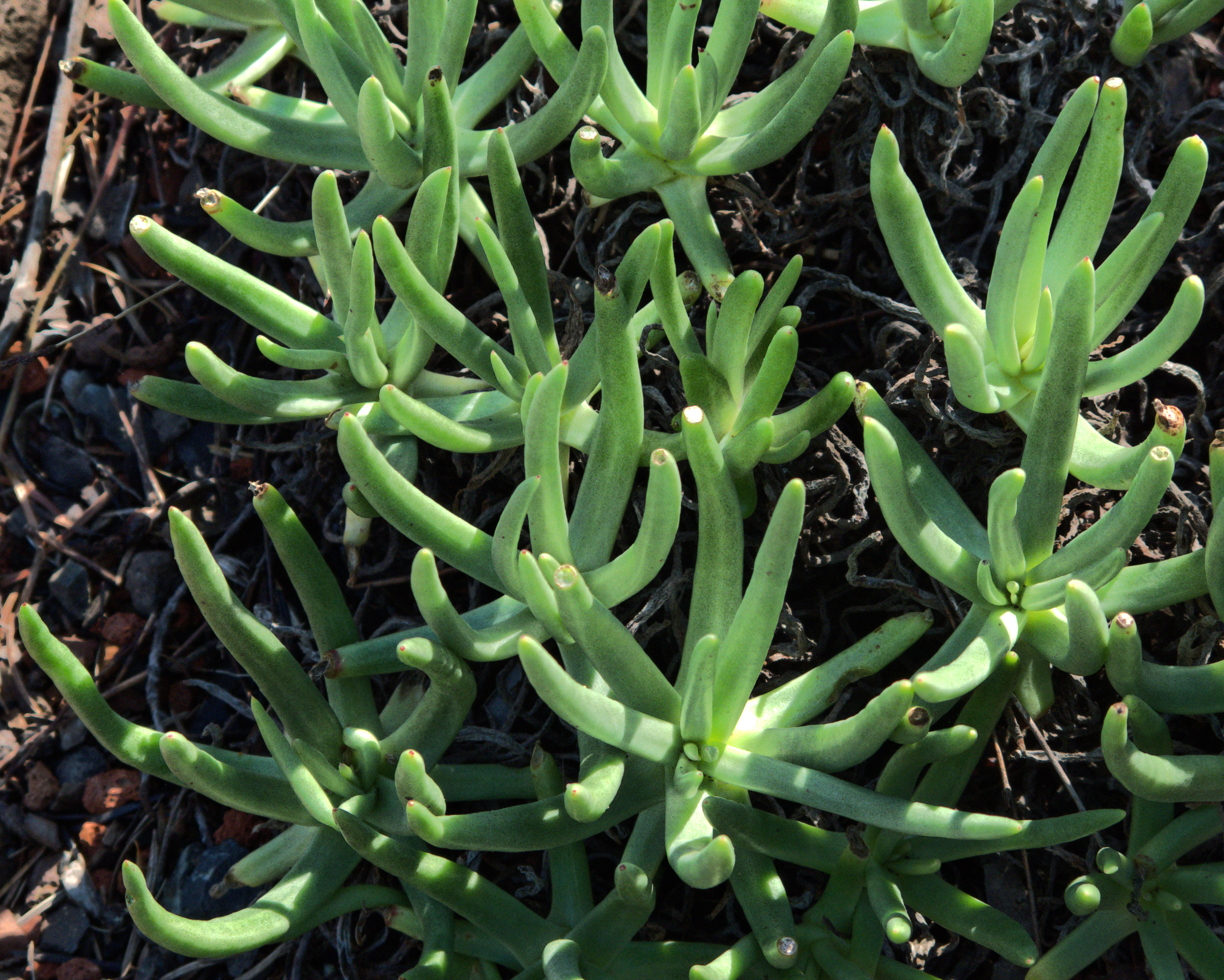

Scientific classification
- Kingdom: Plantae
- Clade: Tracheophytes
- Clade: Angiosperms
- Clade: Eudicots
- Order: Saxifragales
- Family: Crassulaceae
- Genus: Dudleya
- Species: D. edulis

Binomial name
- Dudleya edulis (Nutt.) Moran

Synonyms
- Echeveria edulis (Nutt.) A.Berger; Sedum edule Nutt.; Stylophyllum edulis (Nutt.) Britton & Rose

= Dudleya edulis =

Fingertips

Species of succulent

Dudleya edulis is a species of perennial, succulent flowering plant of the Crassulaceae, known by the common names fingertips, lady-fingers, mission lettuce, or simply the San Diego dudleya. The common name "fingertips" denotes the finger-like shape of the leaves; the specific epithet edulis (meaning "edible") refers to the Kumeyaay people's traditional foraging and consumption of the plant's young scapes. Dudleya edulis is native to the dry, coastal cliffs and chaparral hills of Southern California and northern Baja California, where it has adapted to absorb as much moisture as possible from the nightly fog and marine layer which forms over the Pacific Ocean and gradually moves slightly inland, typically covering all plants and stationary objects in dew. In addition to its inherent drought-tolerance and xeric qualities, this species is also highly salt-tolerant, as it grows almost exclusively facing the ocean, often in exposed settings where it is subjected to regular periods of extreme wind and weather. The species may be found growing on rocky hillsides, sandstone sea cliffs, chaparral habitat, arid canyons, or rooted between exposed, bare rock crevices.

== Description ==
Dudleya edulis is made up of an array of fleshy, finger-like leaves growing vertically from a caudex at or just below ground level. The fingerlike leaves are pale green, cylindrical and pointed, growing up to 20 centimetres (7.9 in) tall. It bears a branching inflorescence 10–50 centimetres (3.9–19.7 in) tall, with several terminal branches each bearing up to 10 or 11 flowers. The flowers have pointed white to cream petals about a centimeter long. The bloom period is May to July. The plant is diploid, with a chromosome number of n=17, which is the base number for Dudleya.

Morphology of Dudleya edulis

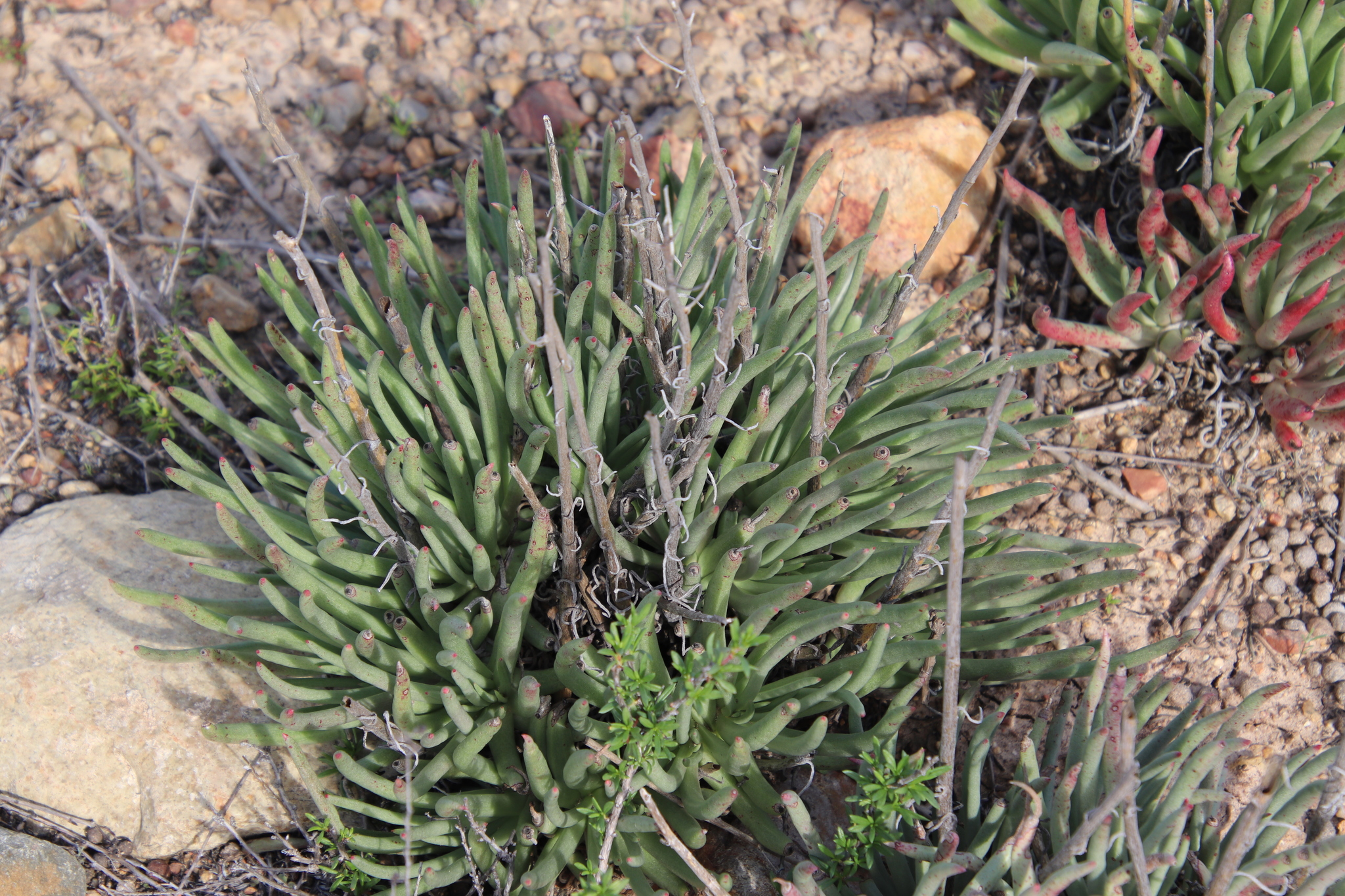
Growing in habitat, clumping

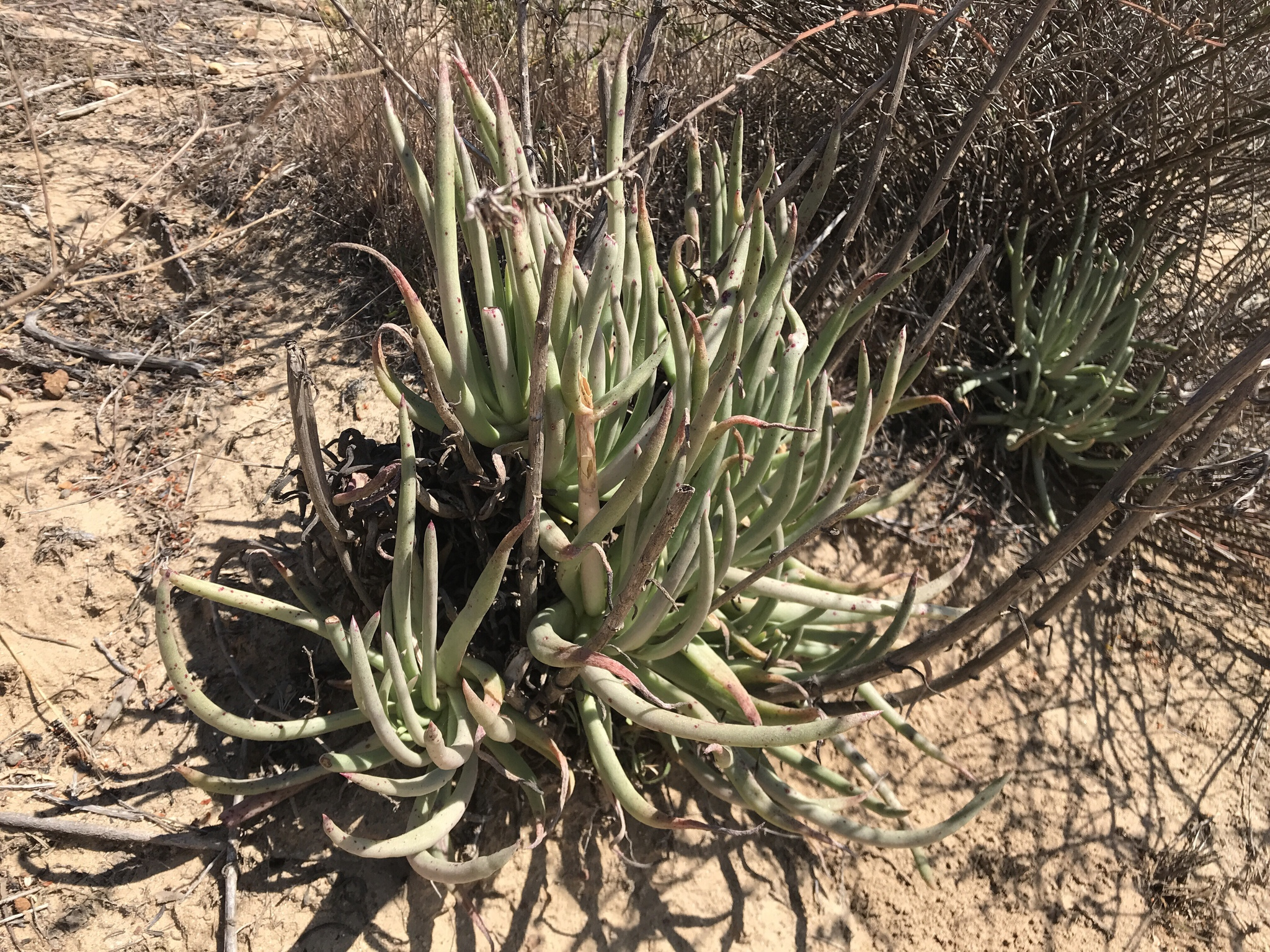
Growing in habitat at Torrey Pines

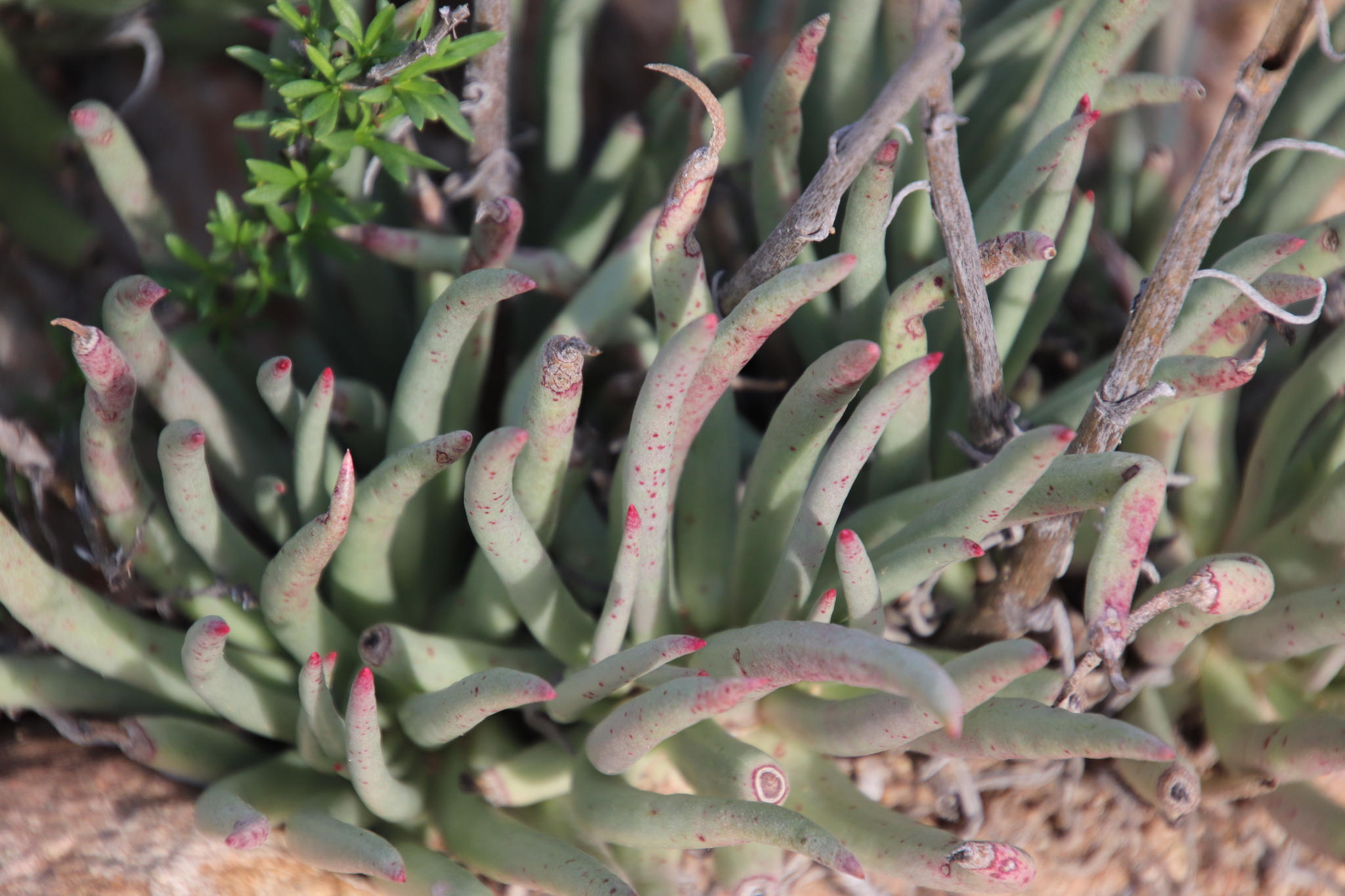
Close-up of the leaves.

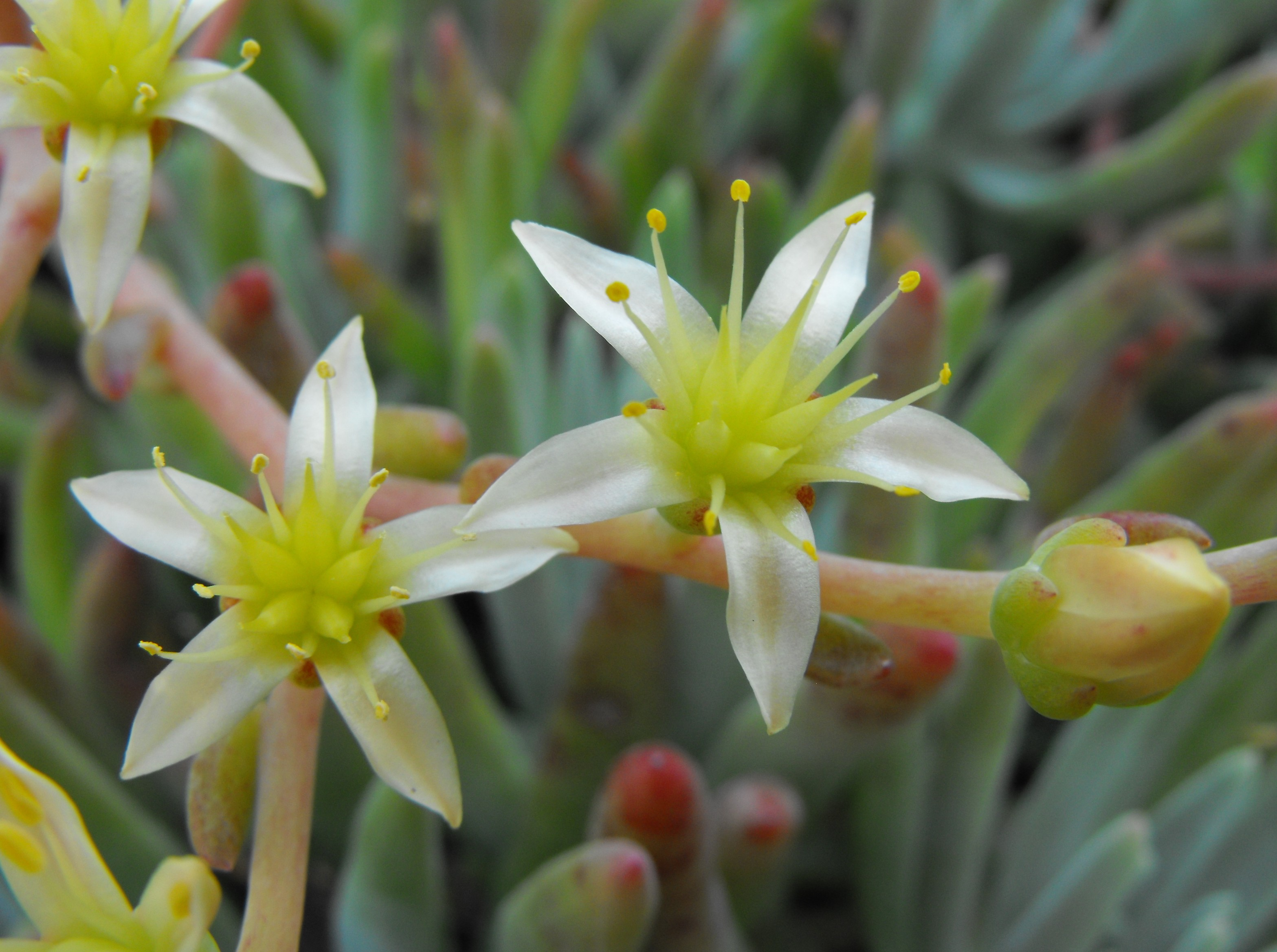
The spreading flowers.

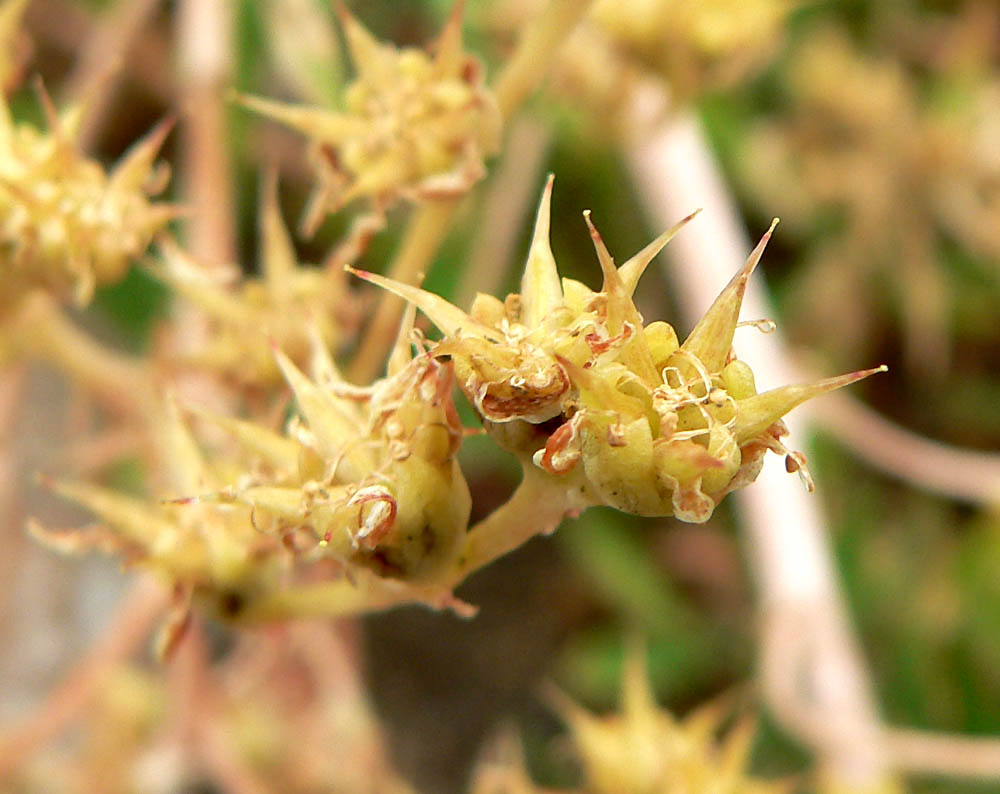
The fruiting flowers of Dudleya edulis. Note the 5 ovaries.

== Taxonomy ==
=== Taxonomic history ===
Thomas Nuttall discovered the species during his visit to California in the 1830s. He found it on the edges of "rocks and ravines, St. Diego" and named it Sedum edule, with edule (meaning "edible") probably referring to the use of the scapes of the plant as food by the indigenous peoples. Despite placing it in the genus Sedum, he noted that it was "a remarkable species apparently allied to Echeveria teretifolia." It is unknown why Nuttall chose to place the plant in Sedum, as he had described the other Dudleya of the region as Echeveria, but it is speculated that he placed it as a Sedum because of the spreading petals on the flowers.

During their work revising the North American Crassulaceae, taxonomists Nathaniel Lord Britton and Joseph Nelson Rose placed the plant in the new genus Stylophyllum, which was differentiated from their new genus Dudleya on the basis of round leaves and spreading petals. With Reid Moran's revision of Dudleya, the plants within Stylophyllum were moved, as Stylophyllum was merged into a subgenera of Dudleya.

Willis L. Jepson once regarded the nearby Dudleya attenuata as a subspecies of this plant, owing to their similar morphology, although they are very distinct. They can be distinguished by the fact that D. attenuata is a smaller plant, with slender and elongated stems, and fewer smaller leaves that are glaucous and clavate to some degree. The leaf bases are also higher, and the inflorescence is simpler with more remote flowers.

It is known to naturally hybridize with Dudleya stolonifera, D. attenuata, D. brevifolia, D. formosa and D. blochmaniae where their ranges overlap. Most of these hybrids are uncommon, and the plants hybridizing with stolonifera may be backcrosses.

== Distribution and habitat ==
Dudleya edulis is endemic to chaparral areas and the many miles of sandstone ocean cliffs and coastal canyons stretching from Southern California and south into northwestern Mexico's Baja California. In California, it is known from the coastal areas of Orange County and east through southern Riverside County; south through San Diego County, ranging roughly 40 miles inland from the ocean and at elevations of around 4,200 feet (approx. 1300 m) above sea level, in places. Its range continues south into the Rio San Vicente drainage in Baja California, a region spanning over 190 miles (305 km) inland from the Pacific coast and east towards the southwest flank of Cuyamaca Peak (the second-highest peak in San Diego). In its southern distribution, the plant is to be found primarily on north-facing slopes and cliffs as opposed to west-facing, maritime exposures.

It grows in rocky slopes and soil, and on rock outcrops and ledges, from sea level to below 1,300 metres (4,300 ft) in elevation. It is found in coastal sage scrub and chaparral and woodlands habitats.

== Cultivation ==
Dudleya edulis is cultivated as an ornamental plant, planted in native plant and wildlife gardens, drought tolerant rock gardens, and as specimens in pots. Thomas Nuttall noted the use of the plant as a food source by the indigenous occupants of the land, which gives the plant its specific epithet. The native peoples would harvest the young tender leaves in spring, and eat them raw. The Tiipai members of the Kumeyaay had a specific name for the narrow-leaved Dudleya like this plant, calling them milh kajmila.
