= Alicia (plant) =

Scientific classification
- Kingdom: Plantae
- Clade: Tracheophytes
- Clade: Angiosperms
- Clade: Eudicots
- Clade: Rosids
- Order: Malpighiales
- Family: Malpighiaceae
- Genus: Alicia; W. R. Anderson

Species
- Alicia anisopetala (Adr. Juss.) W. R. Anderson; Alicia macrodisca (Tr. & Pl.) W. R. Anderson

Genus of plants

Alicia is a genus in the Malpighiaceae, a family of about 75 genera of flowering plants in the order Malpighiales. Alicia comprises 2 species of woody vines widespread in South America.

It is named after the Argentine-French botanist Alicia Lourteig.

== External links and references ==
- Malpighiaceae Malpighiaceae - description, taxonomy, phylogeny, and nomenclature
- Alicia
- Anderson, W. R. 2006. Eight segregates from the neotropical genus Mascagnia (Malpighiaceae). Novon 16: 168–204.
