= Connation =

Term in botanical morphology

Connation in plants is the developmental fusion of organs of the same type, for example, petals to one another to form a tubular corolla. This is in contrast to adnation, the fusion of dissimilar organs. Such organs are described as connate or adnate, respectively. When like organs that are usually well separated are placed next to each other, but not actually connected, they are described as connivent (that is the case for anthers in several genera, such as Solanum).

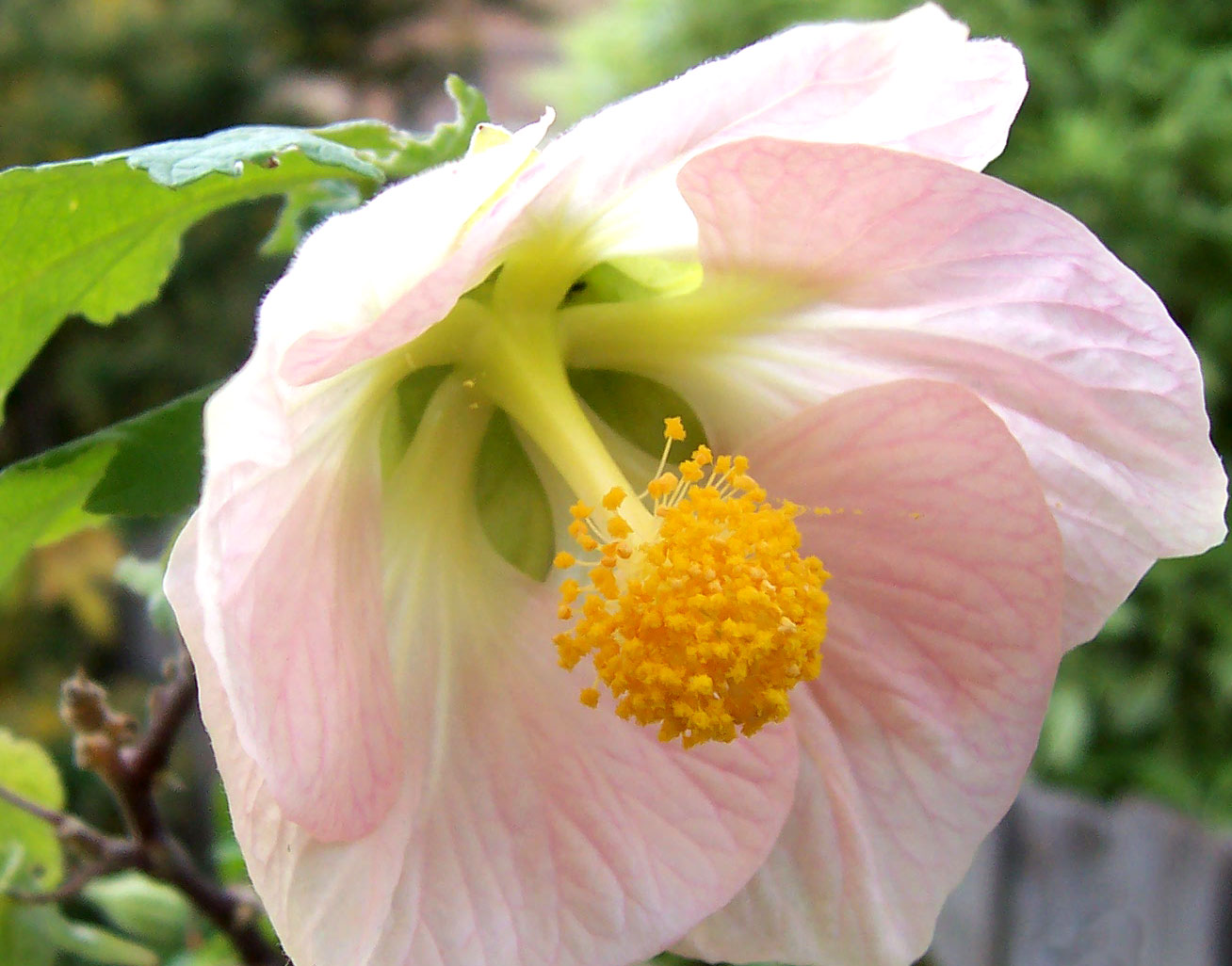
The stamens of Hibiscus (like many Malvaceae) are synfilamentous.

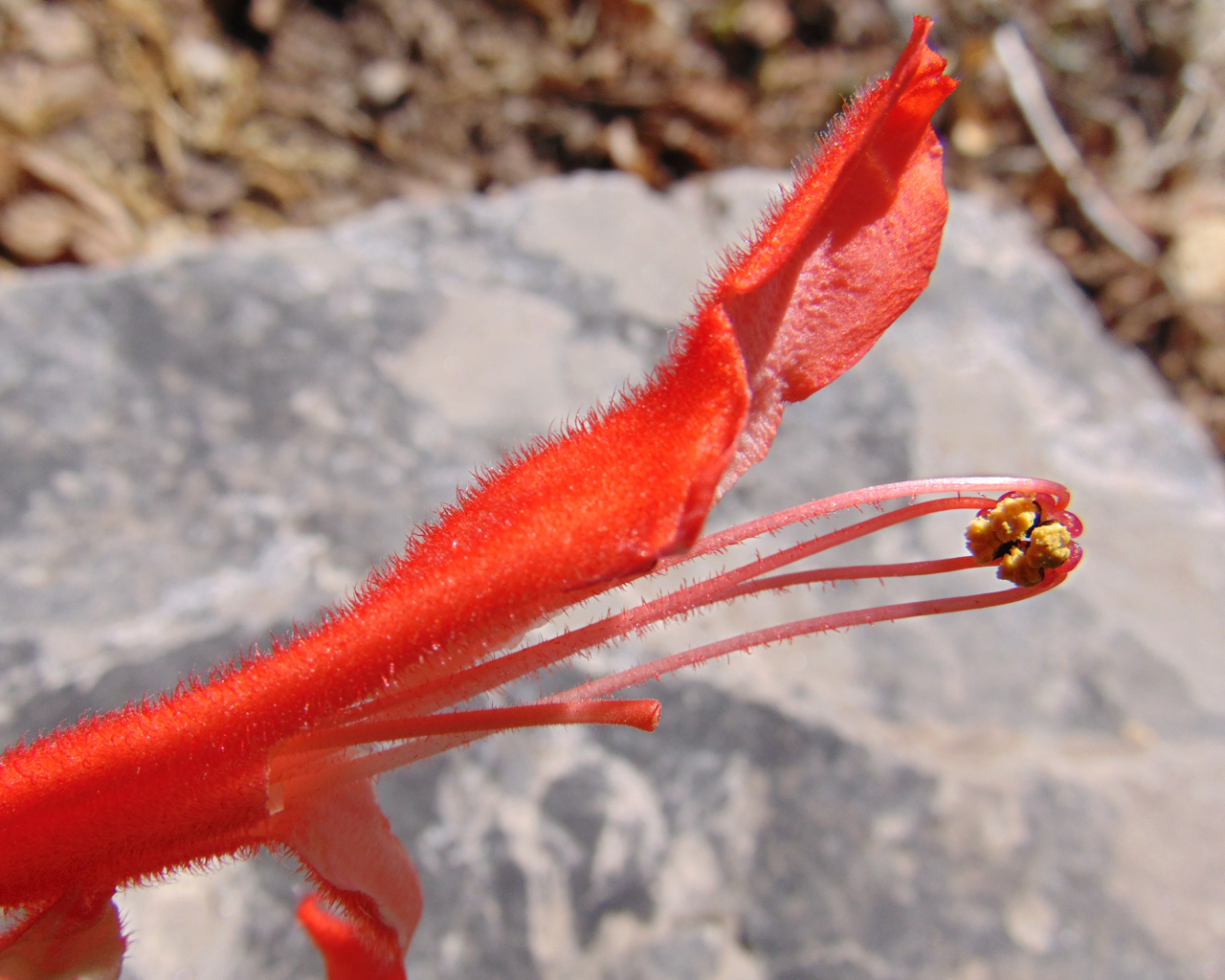
Synanthery in a (dissected) flower of Sinningia cardinalis

== Terms for connation of flower parts ==
- Synsepalous: All the sepals of a flower are fused into a cup or tube; the fused portion is the calyx tube, and any non fused tips are the calyx lobes.
- Sympetalous: All the petals of a flower are fused into a cup, tube, or other shape.
- Stamens:
  - Synandrous: Stamens are fused in an unspecified manner
  - Synfilamentous: Stamens are fused by their filaments
  - Synantherous: Stamens are fused by their anthers
- Syncarpous: Carpels are fused together to form a compound ovary
