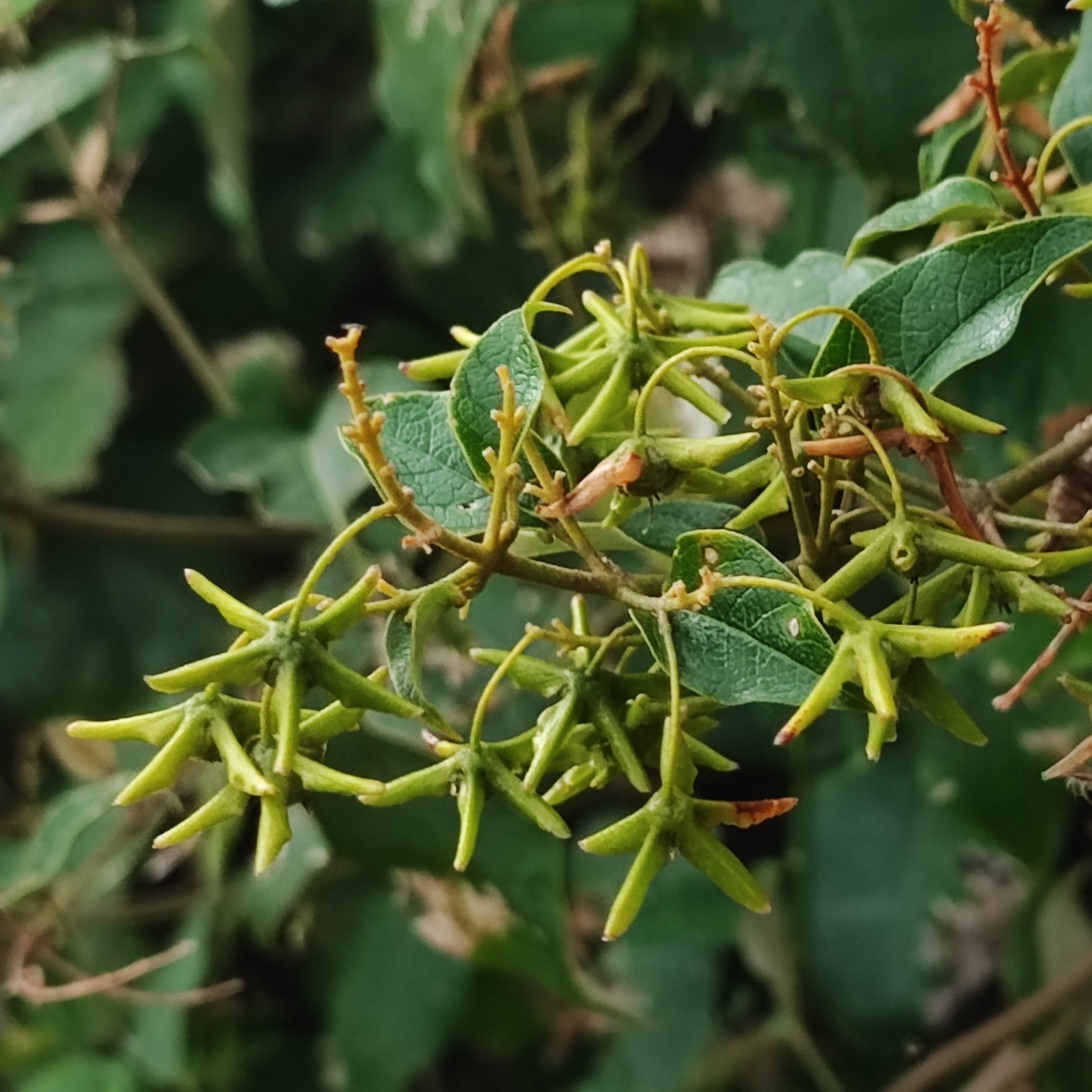
- Thryallis parviflora

Scientific classification
- Kingdom: Plantae
- Clade: Tracheophytes
- Clade: Angiosperms
- Clade: Eudicots
- Clade: Rosids
- Order: Malpighiales
- Family: Malpighiaceae
- Genus: Thryallis; Mart. 1829

Species
- Thryallis brachystachys Lindl.; Thryallis laburnum S. Moore; Thryallis longifolia Martius; Thryallis parviflora C. E. Anderson

= Thryallis =

Family of shrubs

Thryallis is a genus in the family Malpighiaceae, of scandent shrubs and woody vines native to Brazil and adjacent Paraguay and Bolivia. However, the name is still sometimes incorrectly applied to some species of Galphimia, particularly in the horticultural trade.

At one time some species now assigned to Galphimia, e.g., Galphimia gracilis, were referred to Thryallis, but the generic name Thryallis is now a conserved name according to the rules of the rules of Botanical Nomenclature. The genus Thryallis is distinctive in the stellate hairs and scales found on the vegetative parts, and in that the limb of the petals is much wider than long, traits not found in Galphimia.
