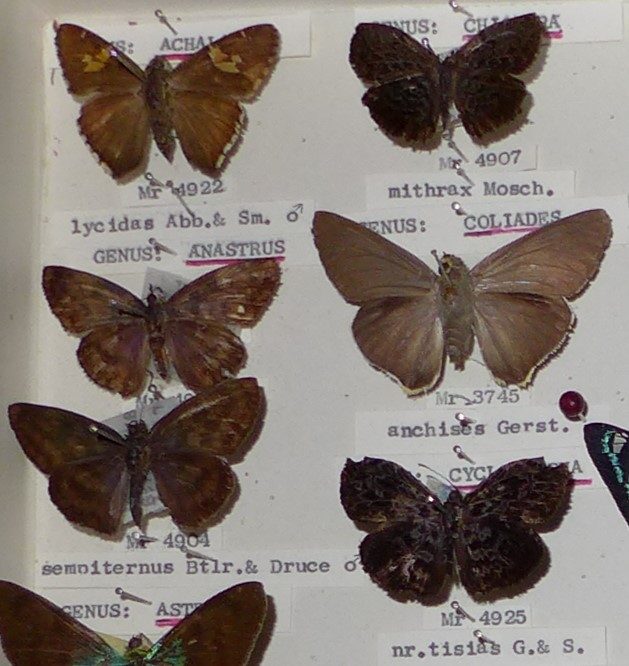

Scientific classification
- Domain: Eukaryota
- Kingdom: Animalia
- Phylum: Arthropoda
- Class: Insecta
- Order: Lepidoptera
- Family: Hesperiidae
- Genus: Coeliades
- Species: C. anchises

Binomial name
- Coeliades anchises (Gerstaecker, 1871)

Synonyms
- Ismene anchises Gerstaecker, 1871; Coeliades jucunda; Ismene taranis Hewitson, 1876; Hesperia jucunda Butler, 1881

= Coeliades anchises =

One-pip policeman

Species of butterfly

Coeliades anchises, the one-pip policeman, is a butterfly of the family Hesperiidae. It is found in eastern KwaZulu-Natal, Zimbabwe, Tanzania, from Mozambique to Somalia, and in Ethiopia.

The wingspan is 55–70 mm for males and 65–72 mm for females. Adults are on the wing from October to March in southern Africa.

The larvae feed on Triaspis glaucophylla, Dregea angolensis, Marsdenia angolensis, Acridocarpus, Tristellateia and Ficus species.

== Subspecies ==
- Coeliades anchises anchises

Range: Ethiopia, Somalia, Uganda, Kenya, Tanzania, Mozambique, eastern Zimbabwe, South Africa and Yemen

- The giant skipper Coeliades anchises jucunda (Butler, 1881)

Range: Oman, Socotra (Yemen), United Arab Emirates
