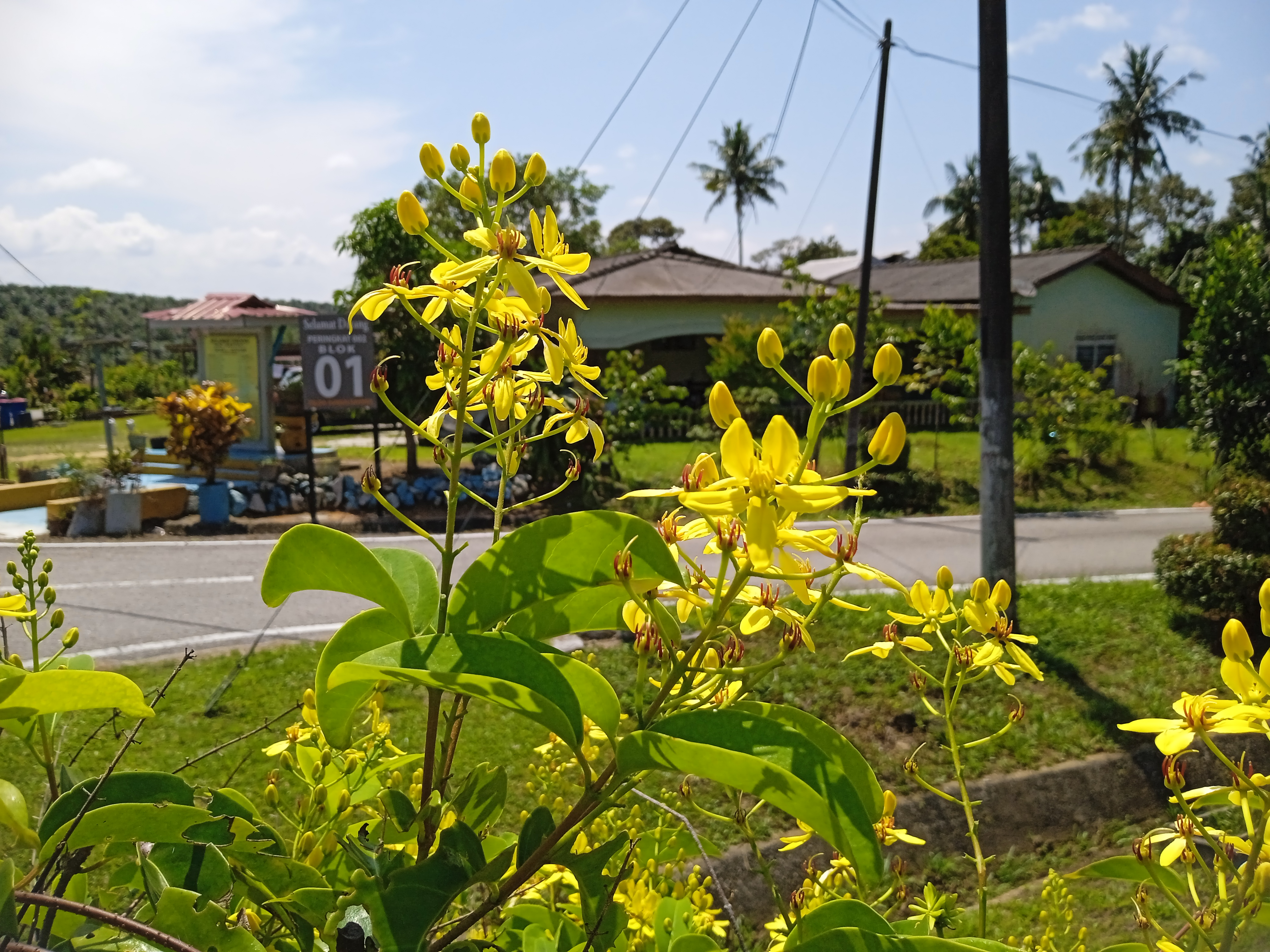

Scientific classification
- Kingdom: Plantae
- Clade: Tracheophytes
- Clade: Angiosperms
- Clade: Eudicots
- Clade: Rosids
- Order: Malpighiales
- Family: Malpighiaceae
- Genus: Tristellateia
- Species: T. australasiae

Binomial name
- Tristellateia australasiae A.Rich., 1834

Synonyms
- Numerous Tristellateia novaeguineensis Blume ex A. Juss. Tristellateia malintana Blanco; Tristellateia australis A. Rich. Platynema laurifolium Wight & Arn.

= Tristellateia australasiae =

Species of flowering plant

Tristellateia australasiae, also known as maiden's jealousy, showers of gold climber and Australian gold vine, is a climbing plant in the Malpighiaceae family that is native to Southeast Asia and northern Australia.

== Description ==
It is a woody, liana that grows to a height of 10 metres where it is generally found in mangroves, creeks, swamps and forests. It features opposite, pedunculate leaves with slightly papery leaf blades that are egg-shaped. Its yellow flowers, which occur all year round in warmer climates, are 2-2.5 cm in width found on racemes that are 10-30 cm long, where each bunch contains around 30 flowers.

== Gallery ==
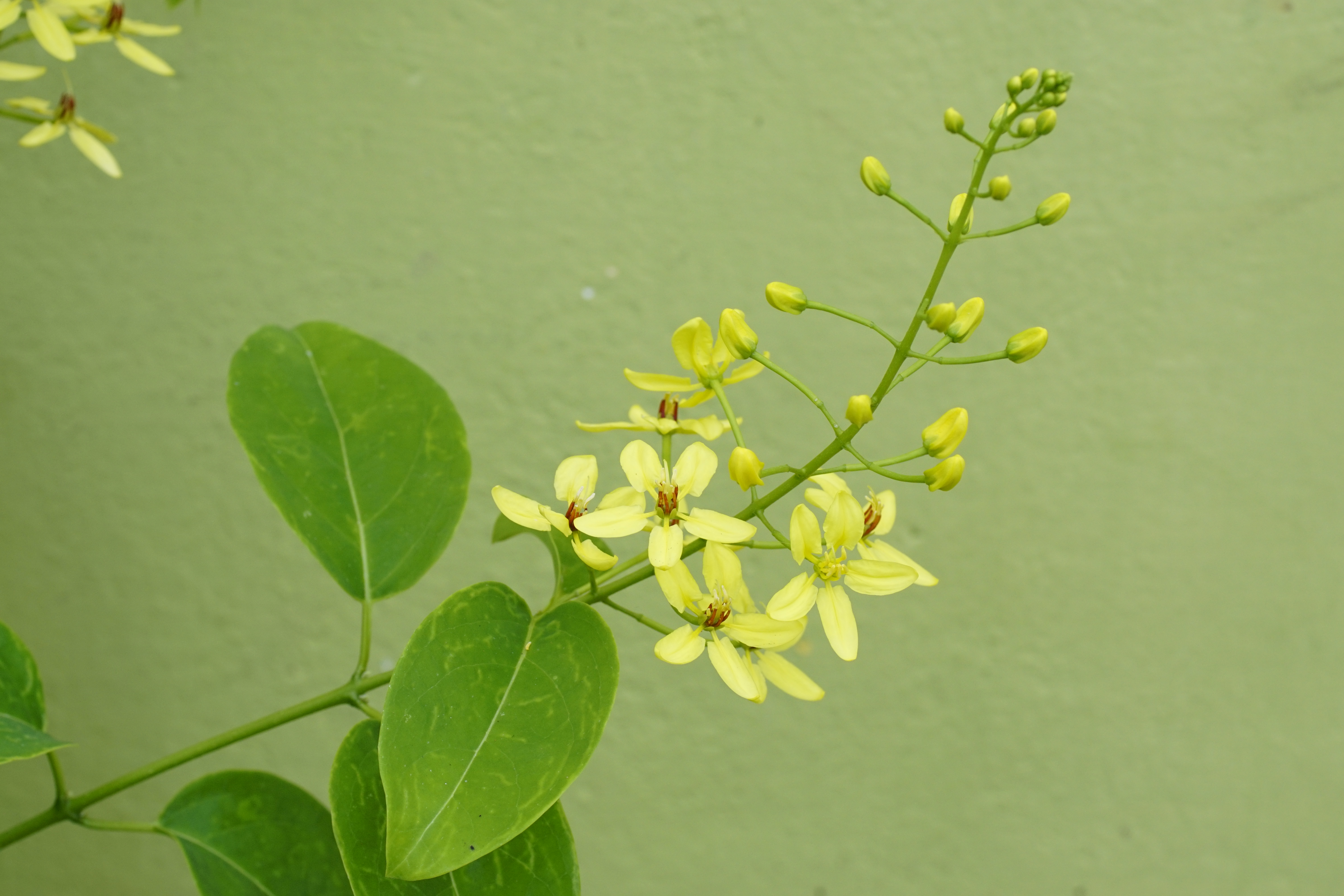
Flower shoot

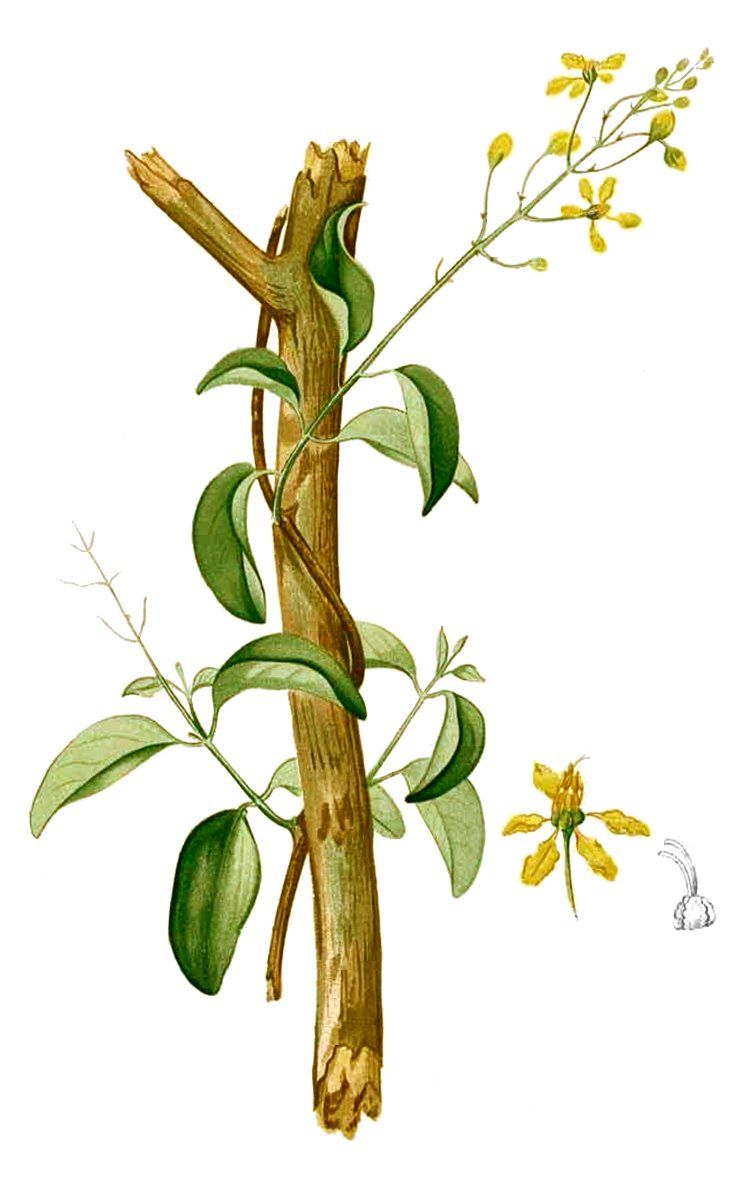
Botanical illustration

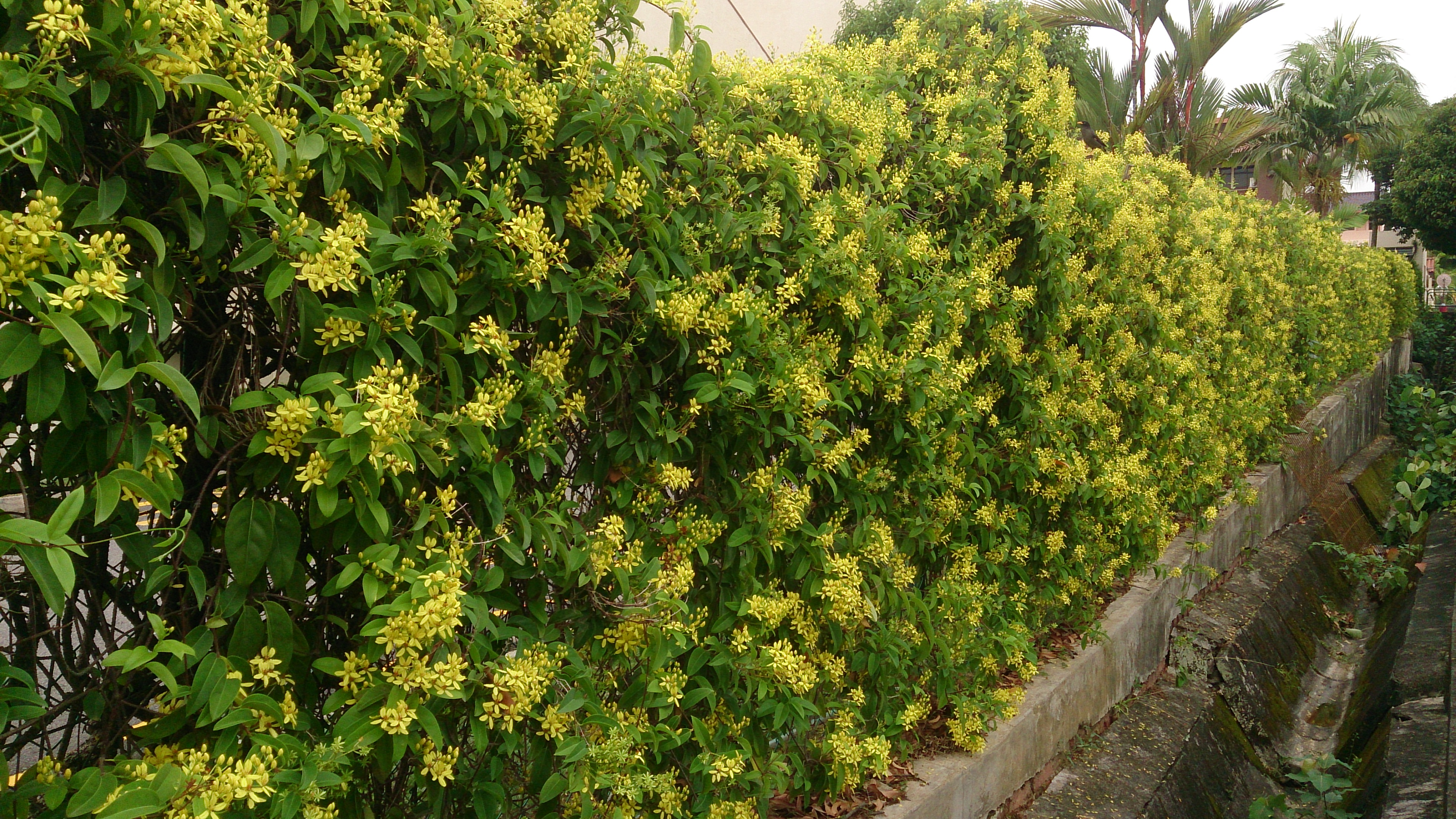
Hedge

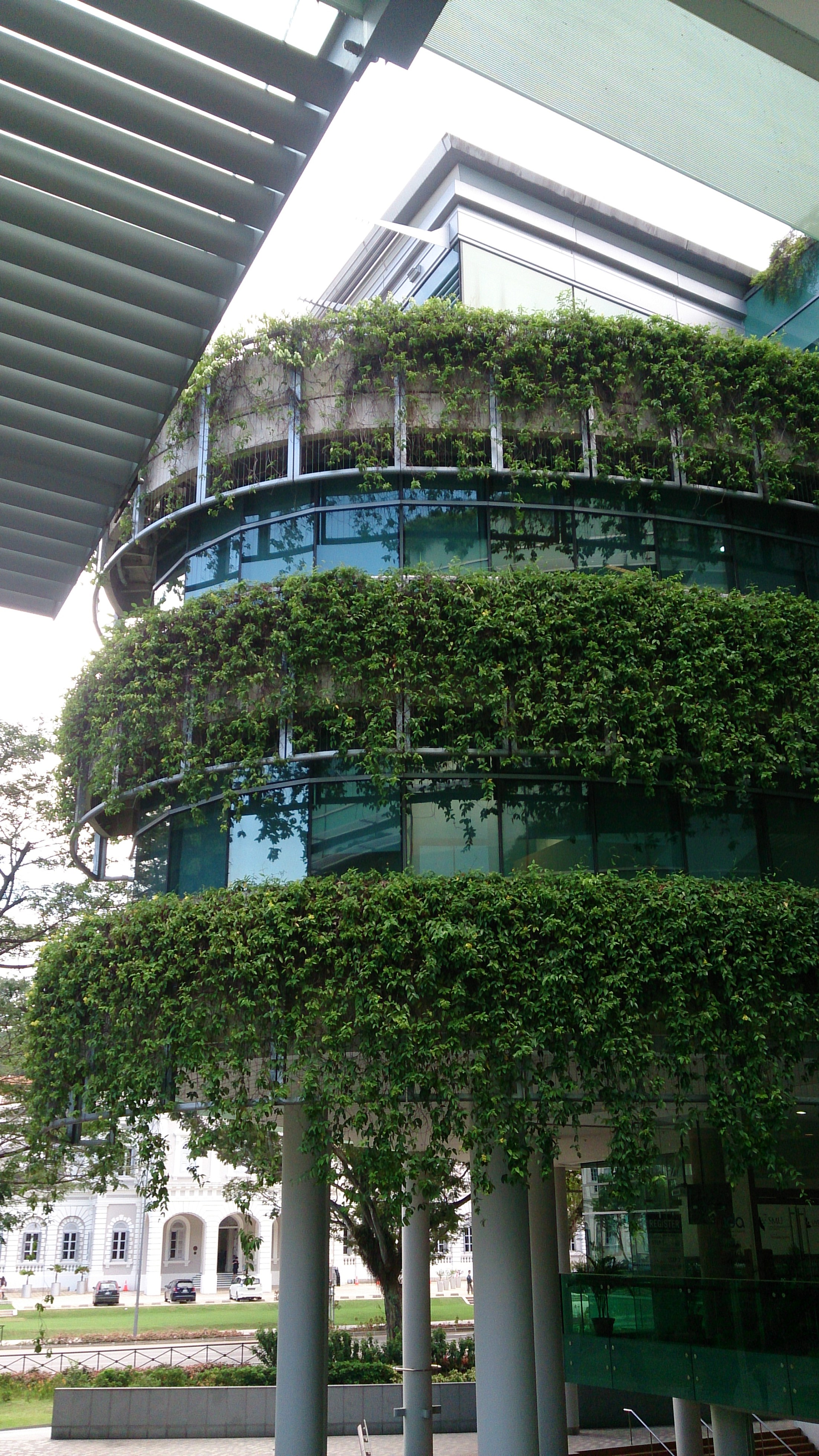
Used as a green wall

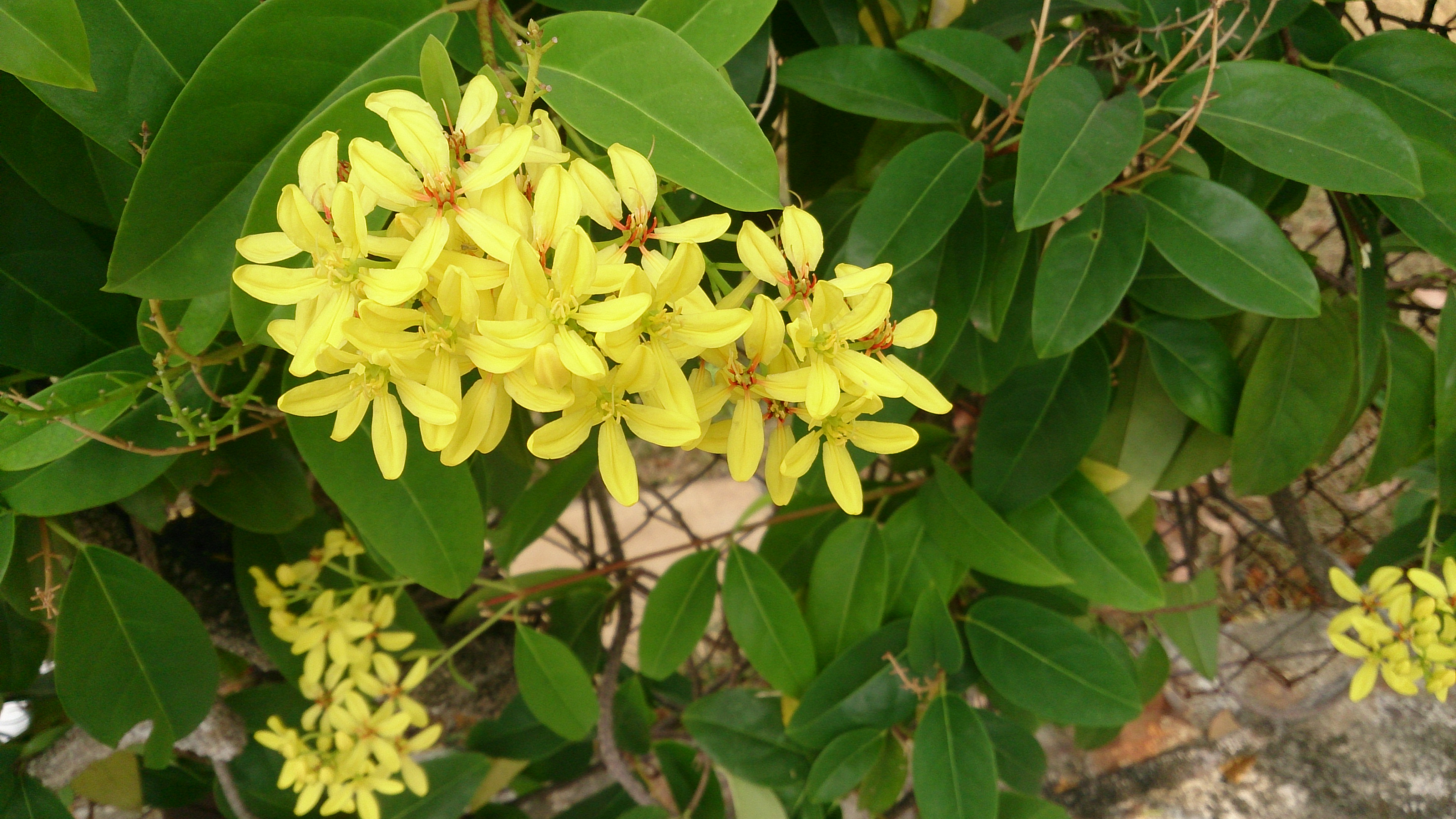
Flowers and leaves

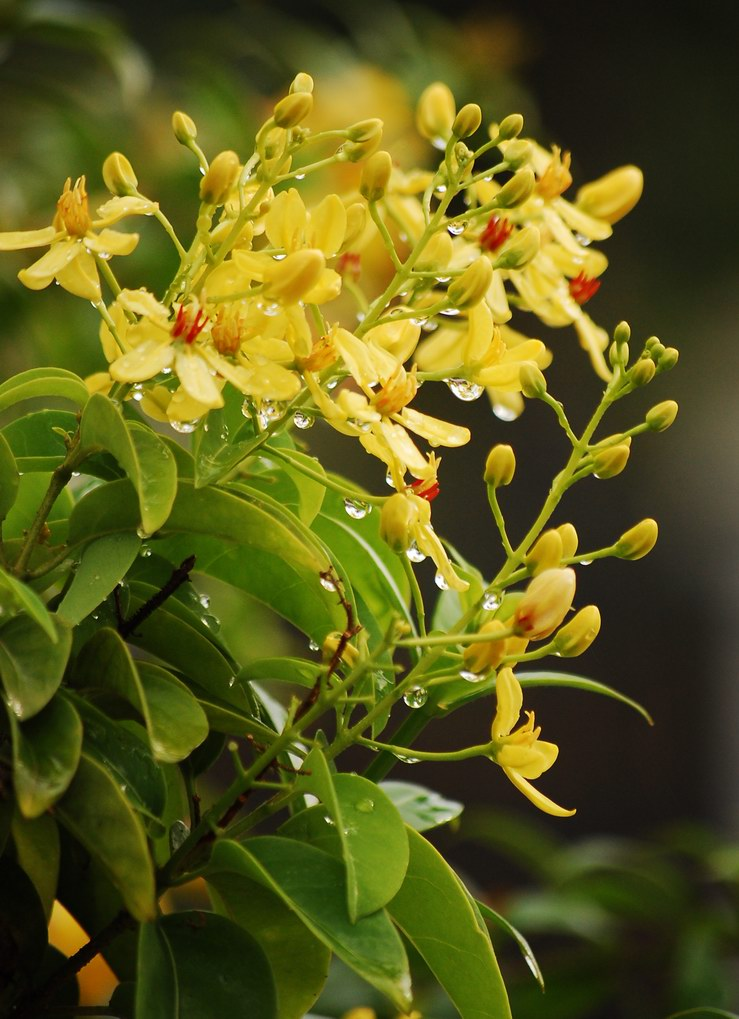
Budding flowers

== See also ==
- Galphimia glauca/Galphimia gracilis, plants in the same family also known as "shower of gold"
