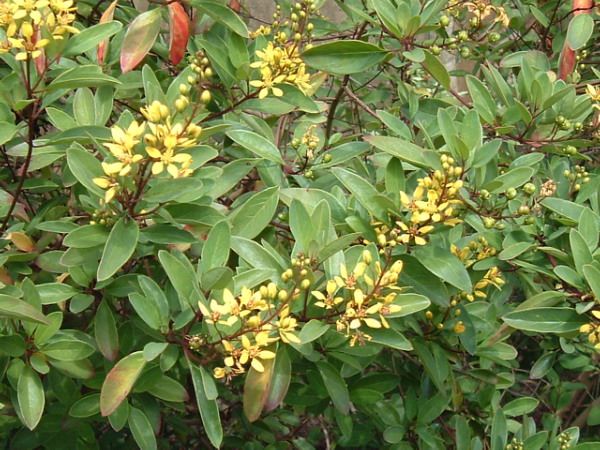
- Galphimia gracilis

Scientific classification
- Kingdom: Plantae
- Clade: Tracheophytes
- Clade: Angiosperms
- Clade: Eudicots
- Clade: Rosids
- Order: Malpighiales
- Family: Malpighiaceae
- Genus: Galphimia; Cav.

Species
- 26 species; see text

= Galphimia =

Genus of flowering plants

Galphimia is a genus in the Malpighiaceae, a family of about 75 genera of flowering plants in the order Malpighiales; the name is an anagram of Malpighia. Galphimia comprises 26 species of large herbs, shrubs, and treelets. Twenty-two species occur in Mexico, one (G. angustifolia) extending into Texas and one (G. speciosa) ranging to Nicaragua; four species (G. amambayensis, G. australis, G. brasiliensis, G. platyphylla) occur in South America, south of the Amazon Basin. Galphimia gracilis is widely cultivated in warm regions throughout the world (but often confused with G. glauca and also G. brasiliensis). Eight species (of Mexico and Central America) are distinctive in that the petals become stiff and papery, and persist past the stage of fruit maturation.

Galphimia is sometimes confused with Thryallis, a different genus of Malpighiaceae that occurs in Brazil and adjacent Paraguay and Bolivia. At one time, some species now assigned to Galphimia were referred to Thryallis, but the generic name Thryallis is now a conserved name according to the rules of the International Code of Botanical Nomenclature. The genus Thryallis is distinctive in the stellate hairs and scales found on the vegetative parts, and in that the limb of the petals is much wider than long, traits not found in Galphimia.

Species

- Galphimia amambayensis C. E. Anderson
- Galphimia angustifolia Benth.
- Galphimia arenicola C. E. Anderson
- Galphimia australis Chodat
- Galphimia brasiliensis (L.) A.Juss.
- Galphimia calliantha C. E. Anderson
- Galphimia elegans Baill.
- Galphimia floribunda C. E. Anderson
- Galphimia glandulosa Cav.
- Galphimia glauca Cav.
- Galphimia gracilis Bartl.
- Galphimia grandiflora Bartl.
- Galphimia hirsuta Cav.
- Galphimia langlassei (S.F. Blake) C. E. Anderson
- Galphimia mexiae C. E. Anderson
- Galphimia mirandae C. E. Anderson
- Galphimia montana (Rose) Nied.
- Galphimia multicaulis A.Juss.
- Galphimia oaxacana C. E. Anderson
- Galphimia paniculata Bartl.
- Galphimia platyphylla Chodat
- Galphimia radialis C. E. Anderson
- Galphimia sessilifolia Rose
- Galphimia speciosa C. E. Anderson
- Galphimia tuberculata (Rose) Nied.
- Galphimia vestita S.Watson

== External links and references ==
- Malpighiaceae - description, taxonomy, phylogeny, and nomenclature from the University of Michigan Herbarium
- Galphimia
- Thryallis
- Anderson, C. 2007. Revision of Galphimia (Malpighiaceae). Contributions from the University of Michigan Herbarium 25: 1–82.
- Anderson, C. 1995. Revision of Thryallis (Malpighiaceae). Contributions from the University of Michigan Herbarium 20: 3–14.
