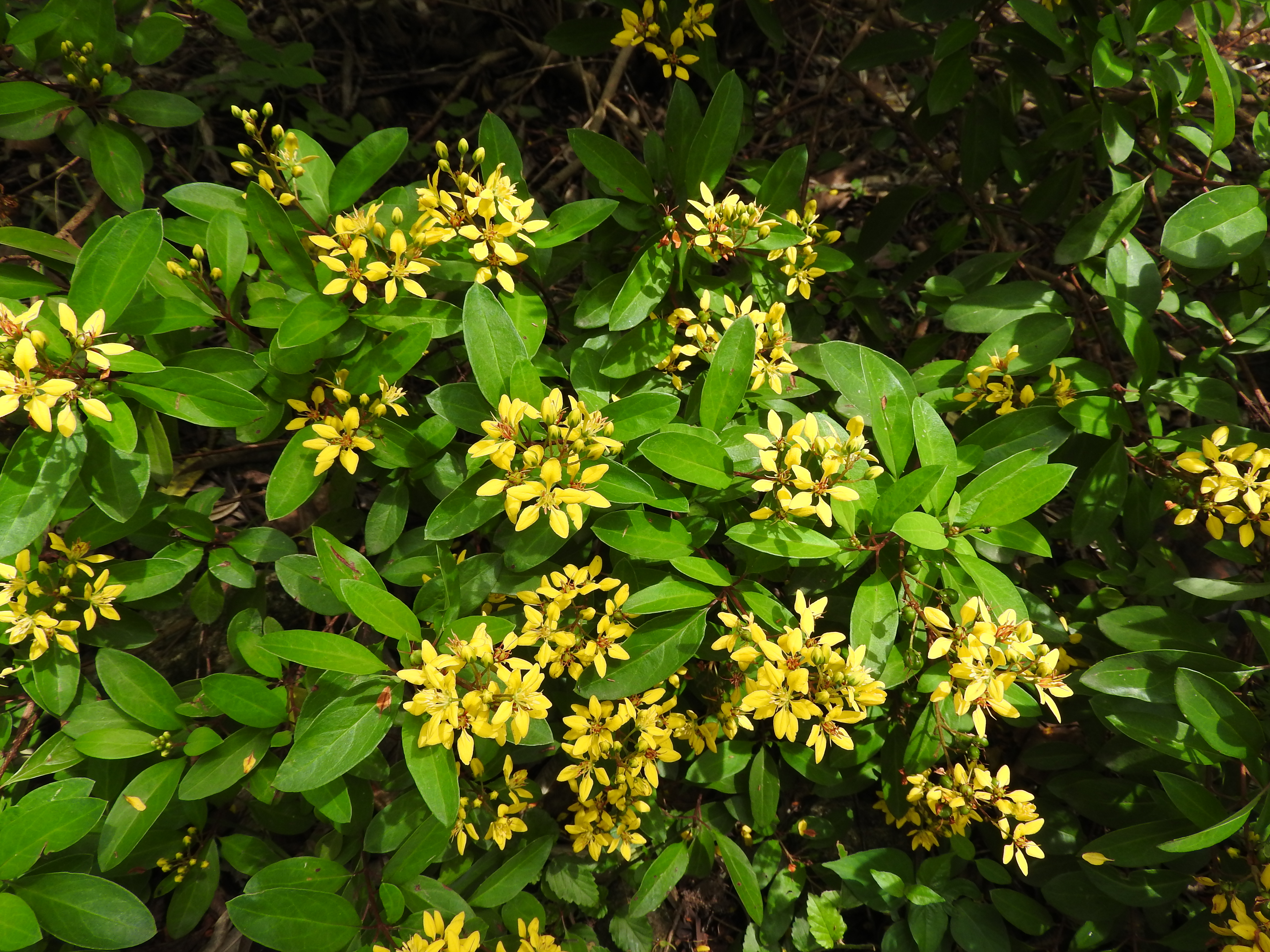

Scientific classification
- Kingdom: Plantae
- Clade: Embryophytes
- Clade: Tracheophytes
- Clade: Angiosperms
- Clade: Eudicots
- Clade: Rosids
- Order: Malpighiales
- Family: Malpighiaceae
- Genus: Galphimia
- Species: G. glauca

Binomial name
- Galphimia glauca Cav.

= Galphimia glauca =

Species of flowering plant

Galphimia glauca, also known as rain of gold, golden showers, thryallis and shower of gold, is a flowering shrub in the Malpighiaceae family that is native to Central America.

== Description ==
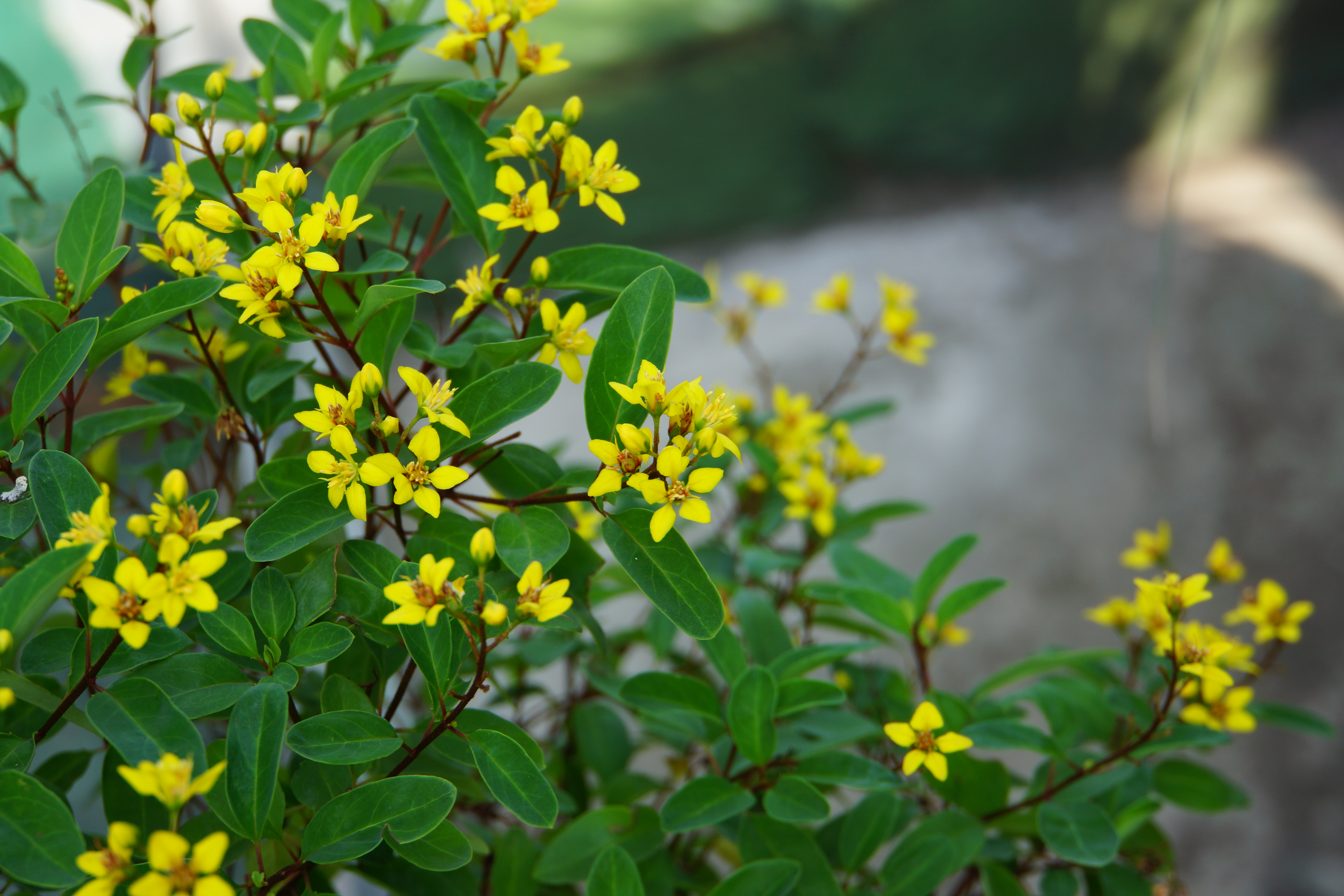
Leaves and flowers

It is an evergreen, erect shrub with branched taproot system that reaches a height of up to 1.8 to 3 metres. The alternate leaves are ovate or elongate, green above and bluish green below which may become bronze coloured during the cold. The sweet-scented flowers are yellow in color, 2 cm in size, with 5 petals and sepals, and are produced in flowery racemes. The plant can bloom in cycles all year round in the right conditions and under full sun, but mostly from early spring to the first frost. Although generally evergreen, near the lower end of its cold tolerance the leaves may develop a rich red-bronze colour in winter.

Galphimia glauca is told apart from Galphimia gracilis by the flowers; in G. gracilis the petals fall as the fruit matures, whereas in G. glauca the petals remain put even in fruit.

== Distribution ==
It is native to Mexico, Guatemala and Panama, where it is found in semi-warm and temperate climates between 920 and 2600 m asl. In Mexico, it is native to select states in the central and northeast zones of the country. In the states of Aguascalientes, Guanajuato, Hidalgo, Jalisco, Nuevo Leon, Queretaro, Tamaulipas, and Zacatecas. It grows in fields associated with disturbed vegetation of deciduous and evergreen tropical forests, xeric scrub, oak, pine and juniper forests. The plant can adapt to drier climates and can resist mild frosts of up to -2 °C.

== Usage and History ==
In the written record, “Libellus de Medicinalibus Indorum Herbis”, the earliest usage of Galphimia glauca is dated to 1552. The Aztecs described the parts of the plant to use and how to prepare it for medicinal uses. Galphimia glauca is primarily used in traditional Mexican medicine to treat "nervios," which translates to anxiety disorders.

== Gallery ==
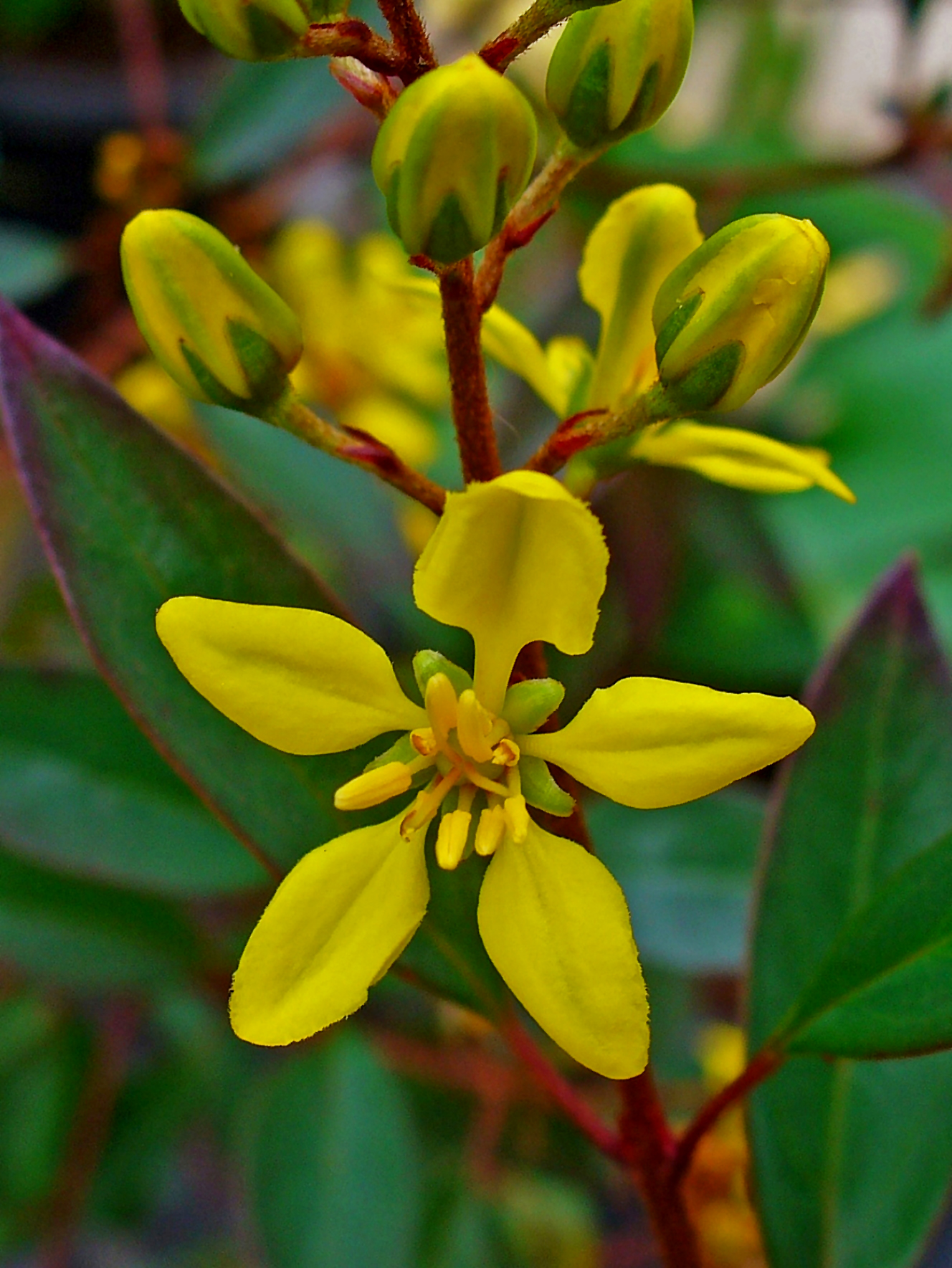
Flower closeup

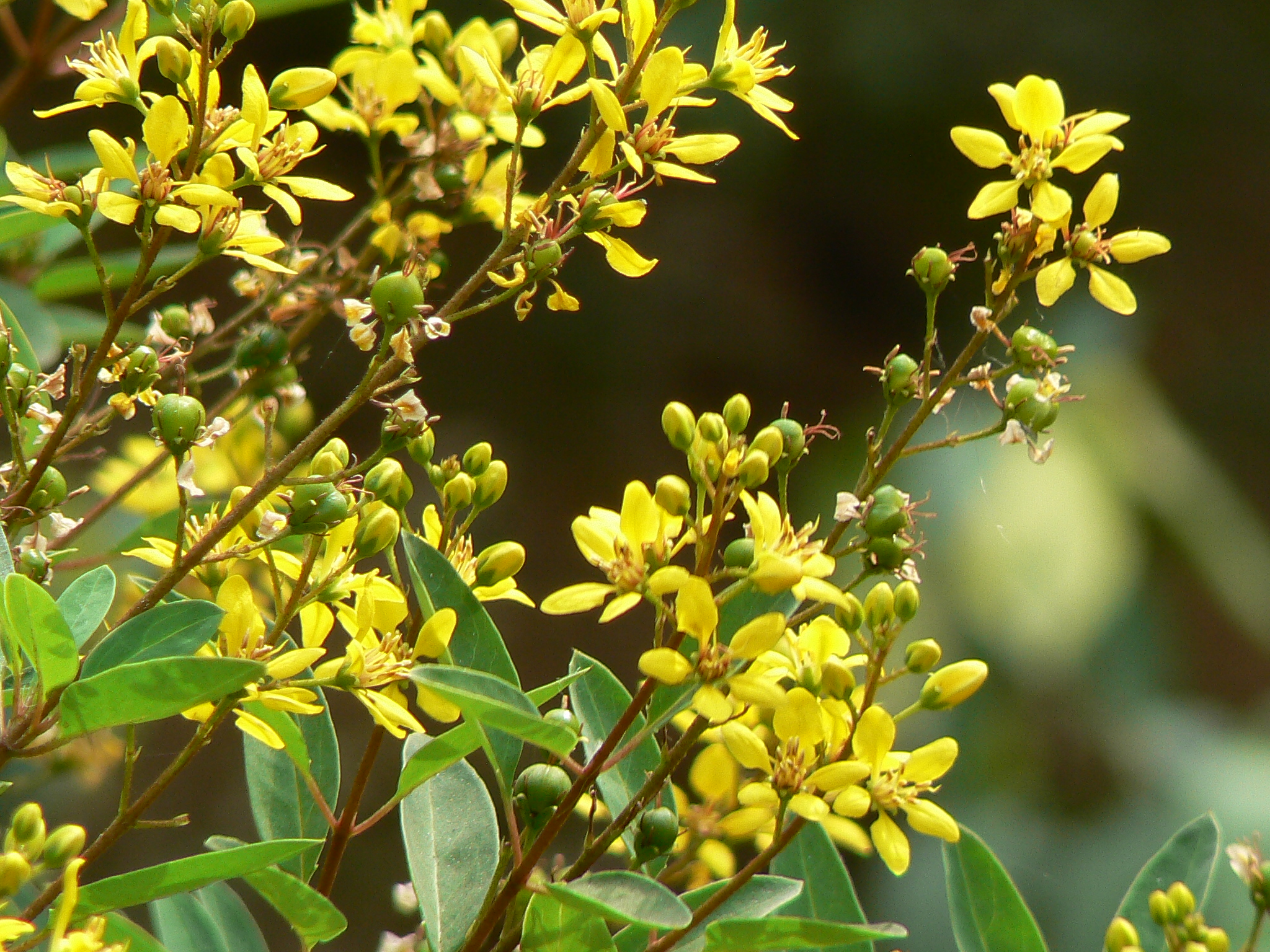
Clusters of flowers

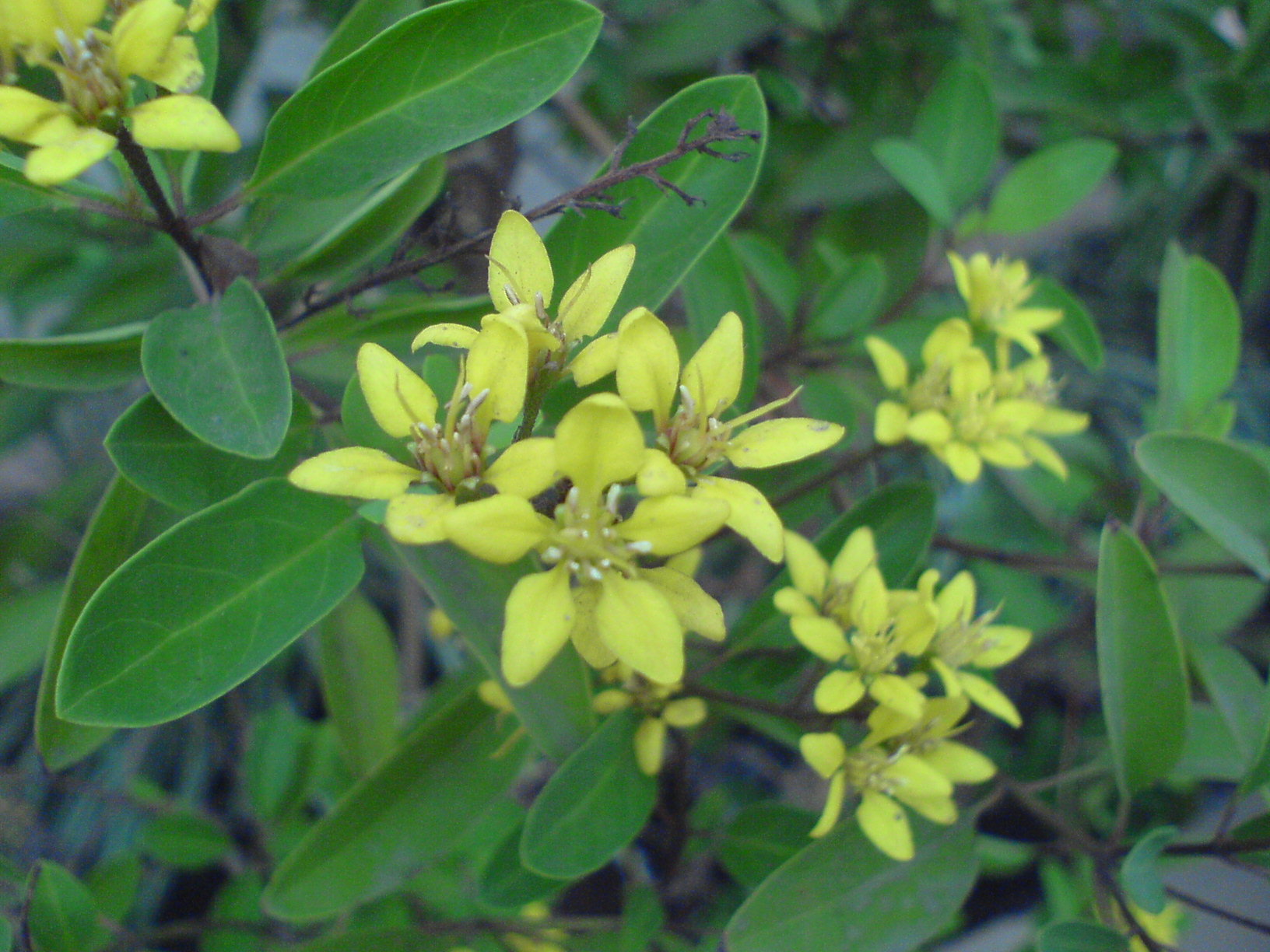
Leaves and flowers

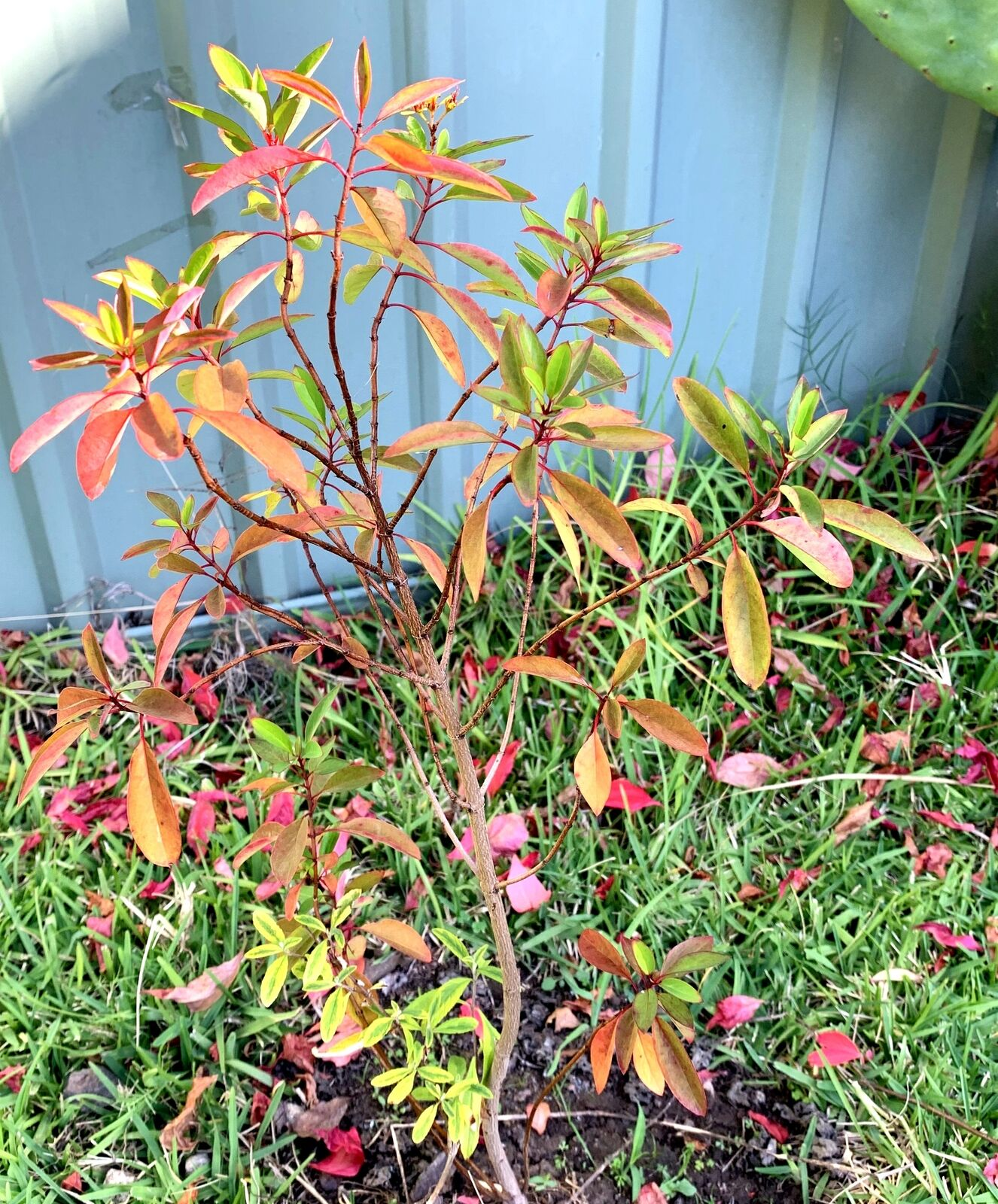
Leaves changing color in autumn

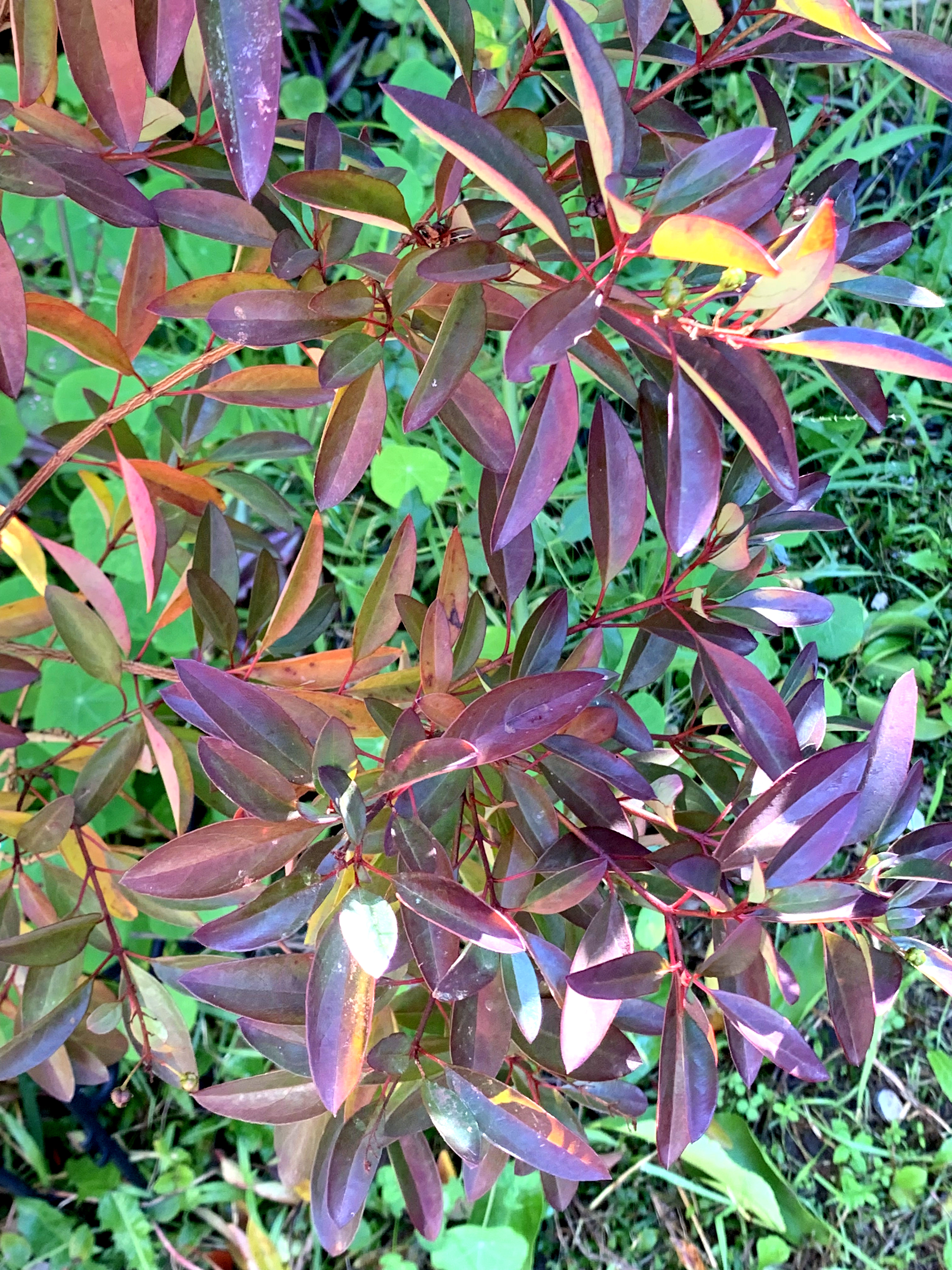
In cooler climates, leaves may turn red in winter

== See also ==
- Tristellateia australasiae, a vine in the same family also called "shower of gold"
