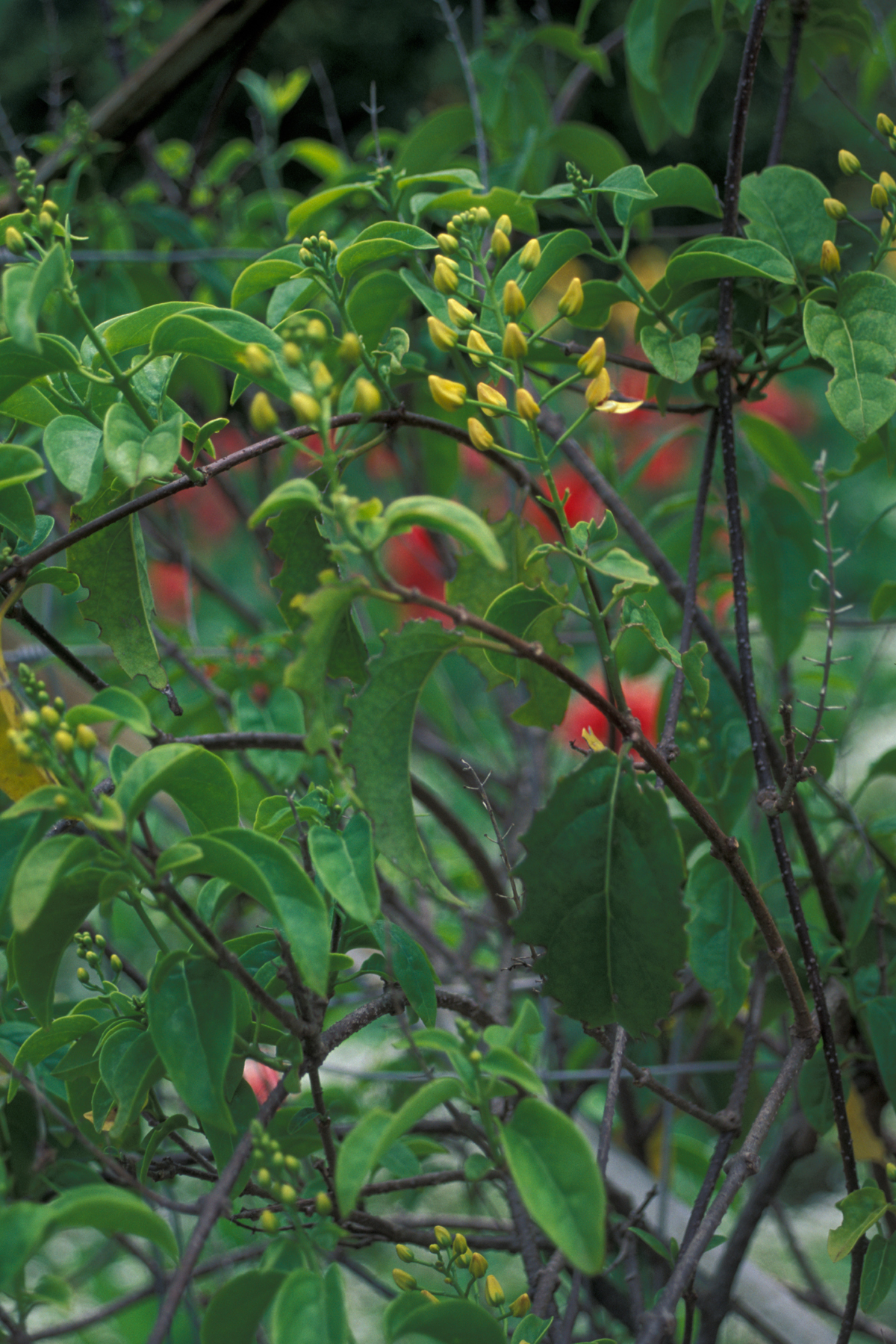
- Tristellateia australasiae

Scientific classification
- Kingdom: Plantae
- Clade: Tracheophytes
- Clade: Angiosperms
- Clade: Eudicots
- Clade: Rosids
- Order: Malpighiales
- Family: Malpighiaceae
- Genus: Tristellateia; Thouars

Species
- ca. 20 species

= Tristellateia =

Genus of flowering plants

Tristellateia is a genus in the Malpighiaceae, a family of about 75 genera of flowering plants in the order Malpighiales. Species of this genus are woody vines or sometimes shrubs with twining branches. Tristellateia includes one species in eastern Africa (T. africana S. Moore); a second species (T. australasiae A. Rich.) is widespread in southeastern Asia and also commonly cultivated as an ornamental. All other species are endemic to Madagascar.
