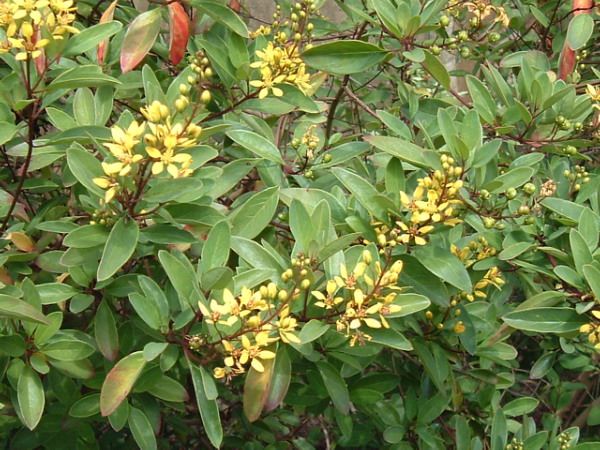

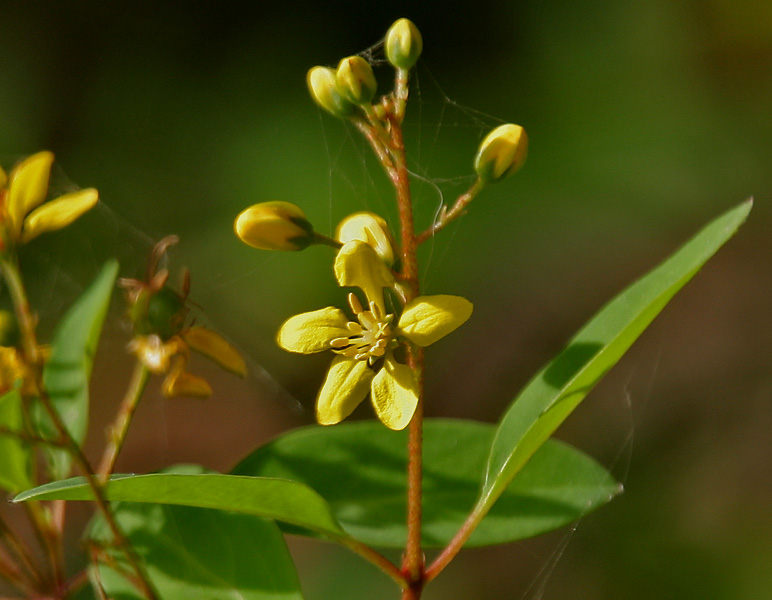

Scientific classification
- Kingdom: Plantae
- Clade: Tracheophytes
- Clade: Angiosperms
- Clade: Eudicots
- Clade: Rosids
- Order: Malpighiales
- Family: Malpighiaceae
- Genus: Galphimia
- Species: G. gracilis

Binomial name
- Galphimia gracilis Bartl.

= Galphimia gracilis =

Species of flowering plant

Galphimia gracilis, a species in the genus Galphimia of the family Malpighiaceae, is native to eastern Mexico. It is widely cultivated in warm regions throughout the world, often under the common names gold shower or shower-of-gold, slender goldshower or sometimes thryallis.

== Description ==
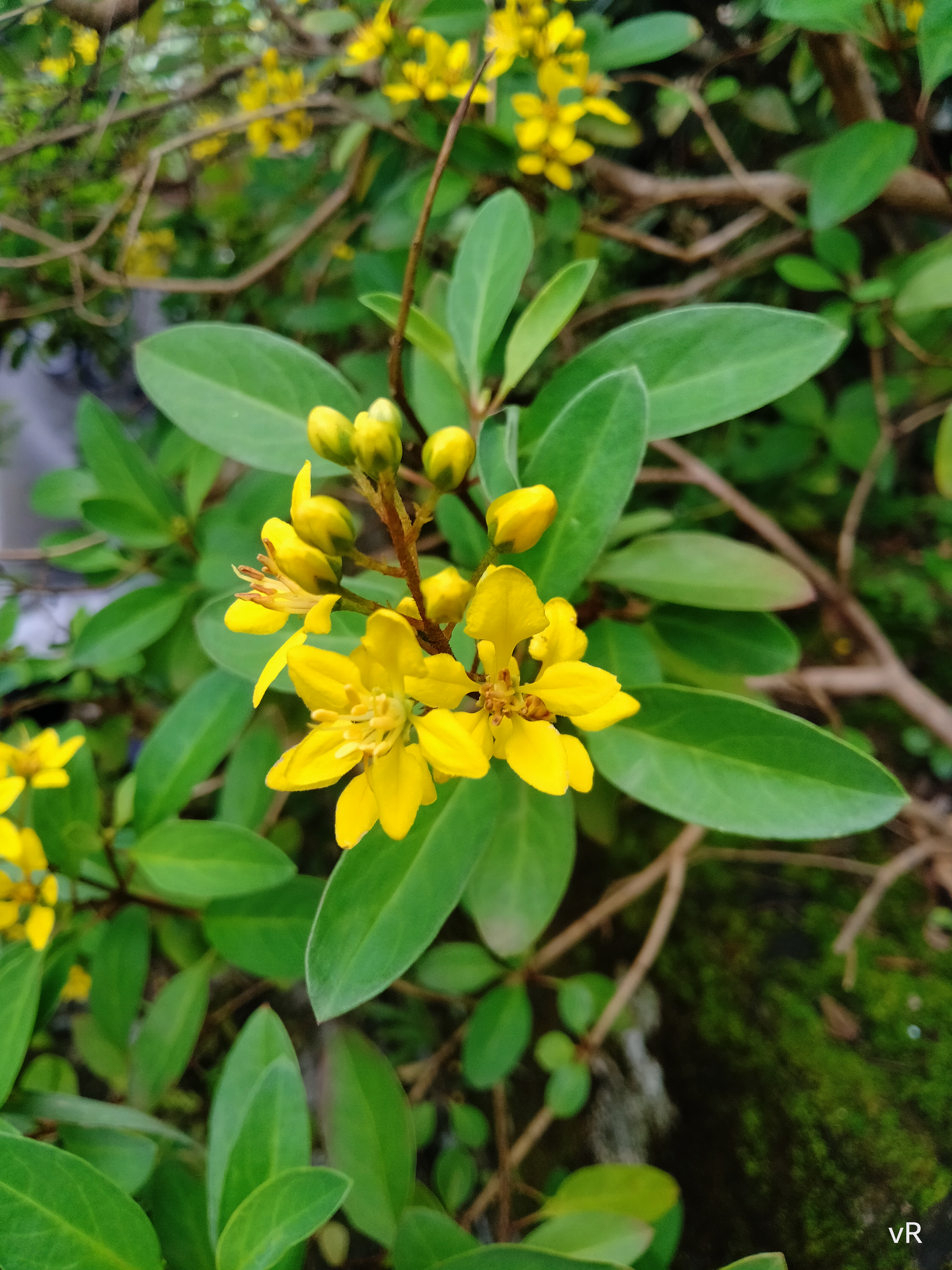
Galphimia Gracilis at Thachangad

Galphimia gracilis is easily told apart from G. glauca and G. brasiliensis by the flowers. In G. gracilis, the petals fall as the fruit matures; in G. glauca the petals are persistent even in fruit.

In G. gracilis, many flowers of a dense inflorescence are open at one time, and the petals (claw and limb) are 8–14 mm (0.31–0.55 in) long and 4–8 mm (0.16–0.31 in) wide; in G. brasiliensis only two or three small flowers are open at one time on a sparse inflorescence, and the petals are only 4–5 mm (0.16–0.20 in) long and ca. 3 mm (0.12 in) wide. Pollen grains are spherical, approximately 16-18 microns in diameter.

== Similar species ==
In horticultural publications, in the nursery trade, and on websites, this species is commonly but mistakenly referred to as Galphimia glauca, Galphimia brasiliensis, Thryallis glauca, Thryallis gracilis, or often in South America, Thryallis brasiliensis.

== Gallery ==
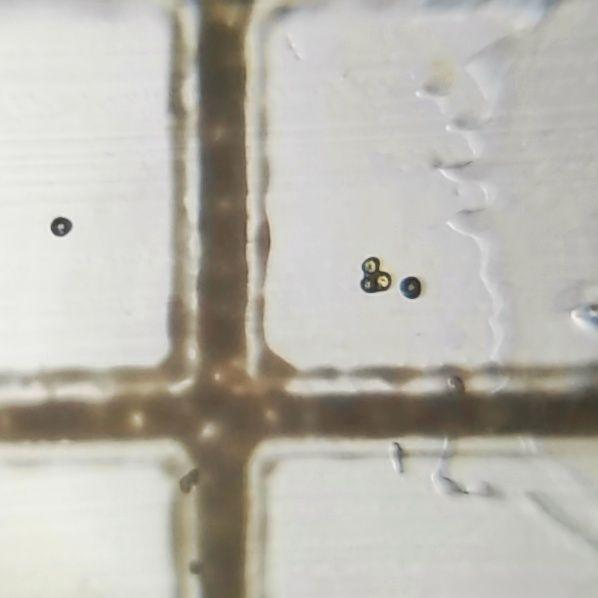
Pollen grains of Galphimia gracilis

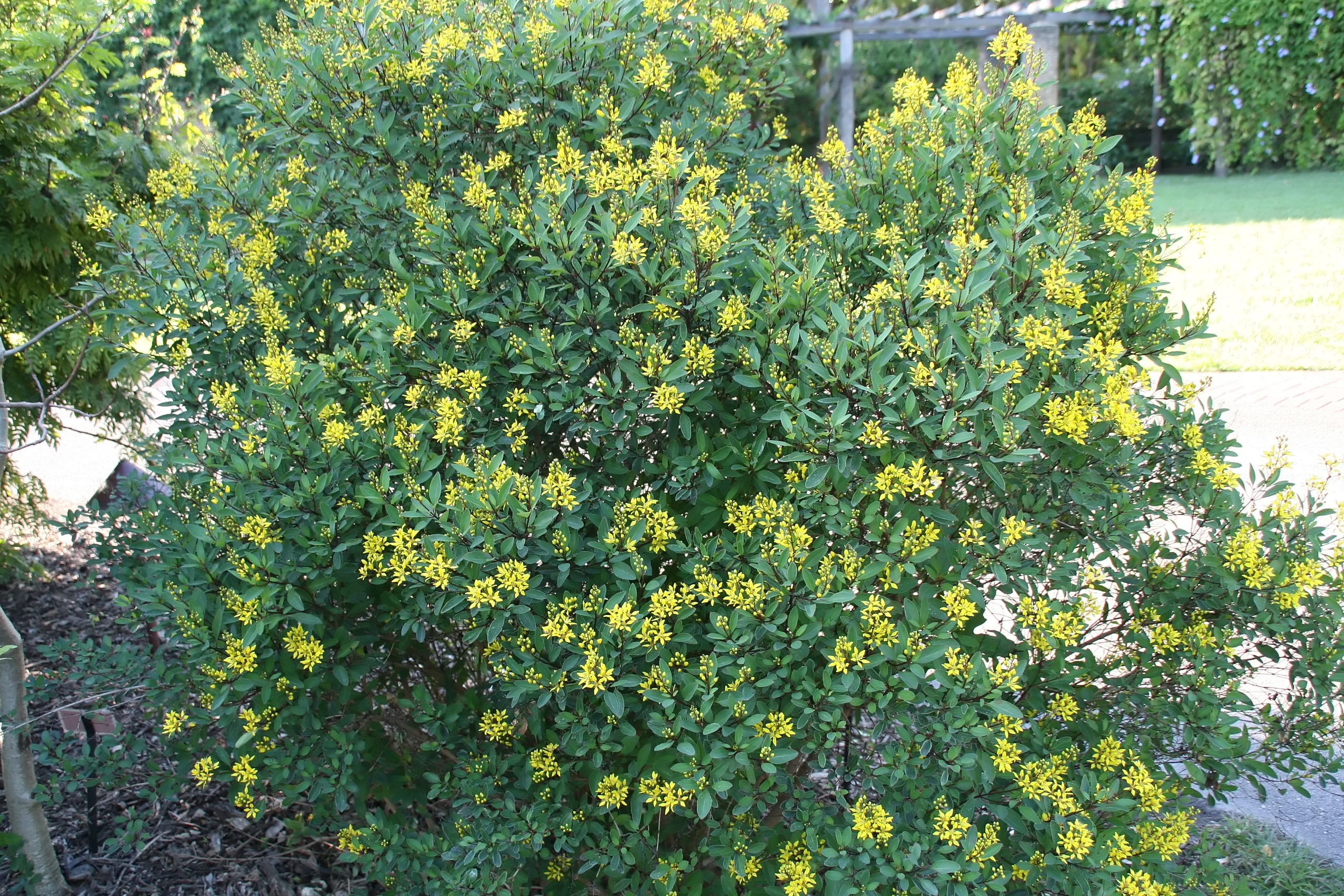
Shrub

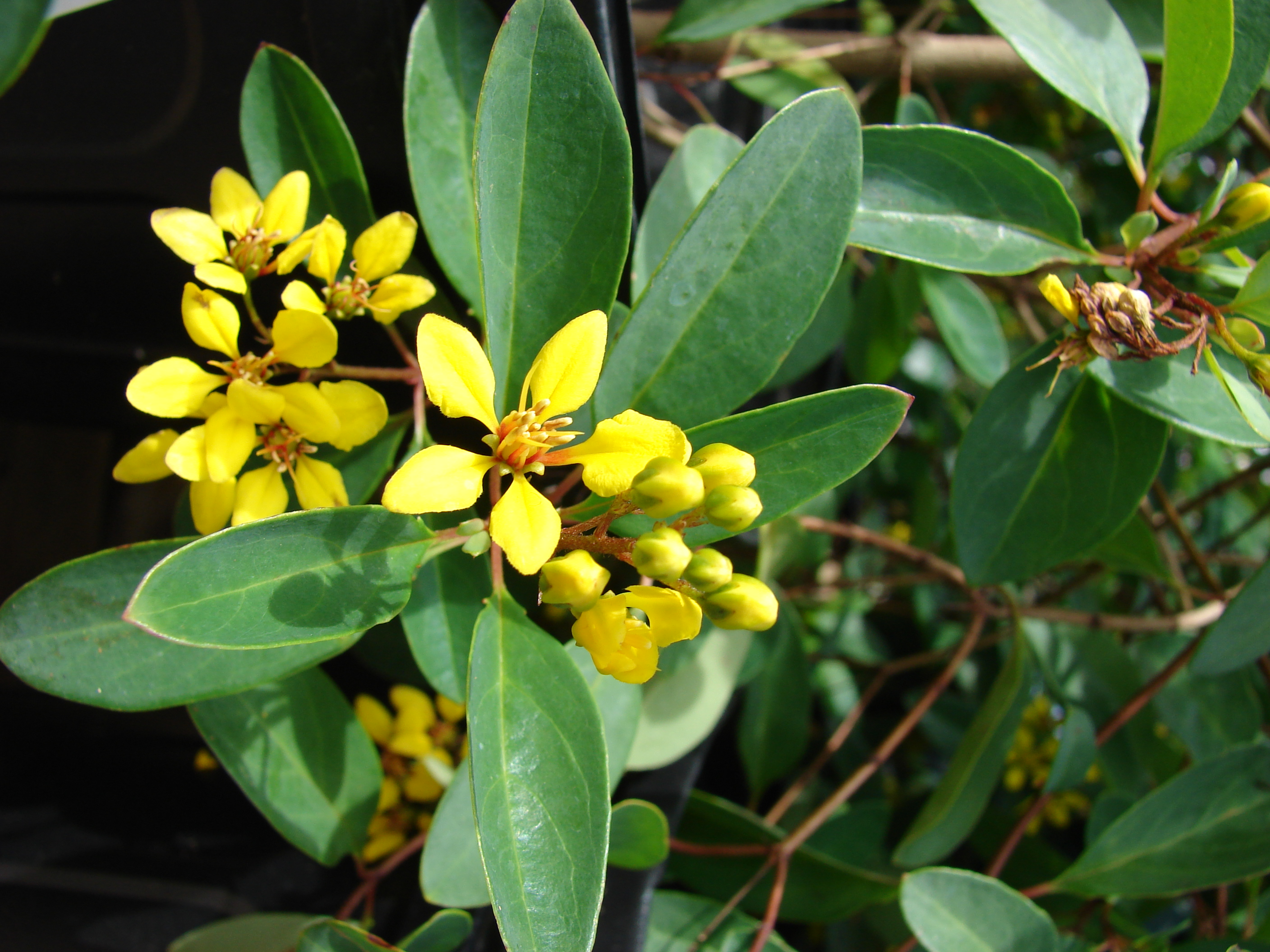
Flowers

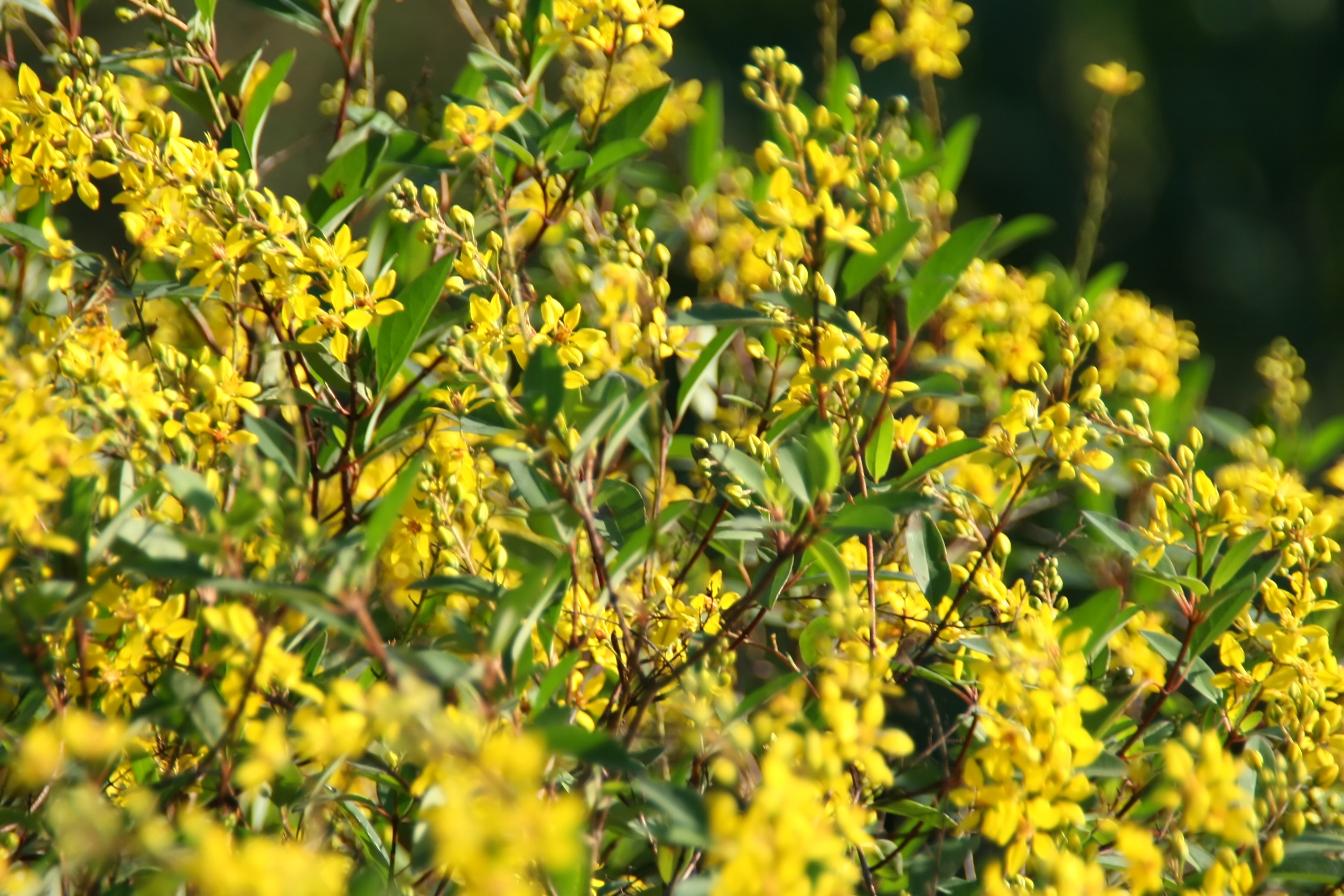
Full bloom

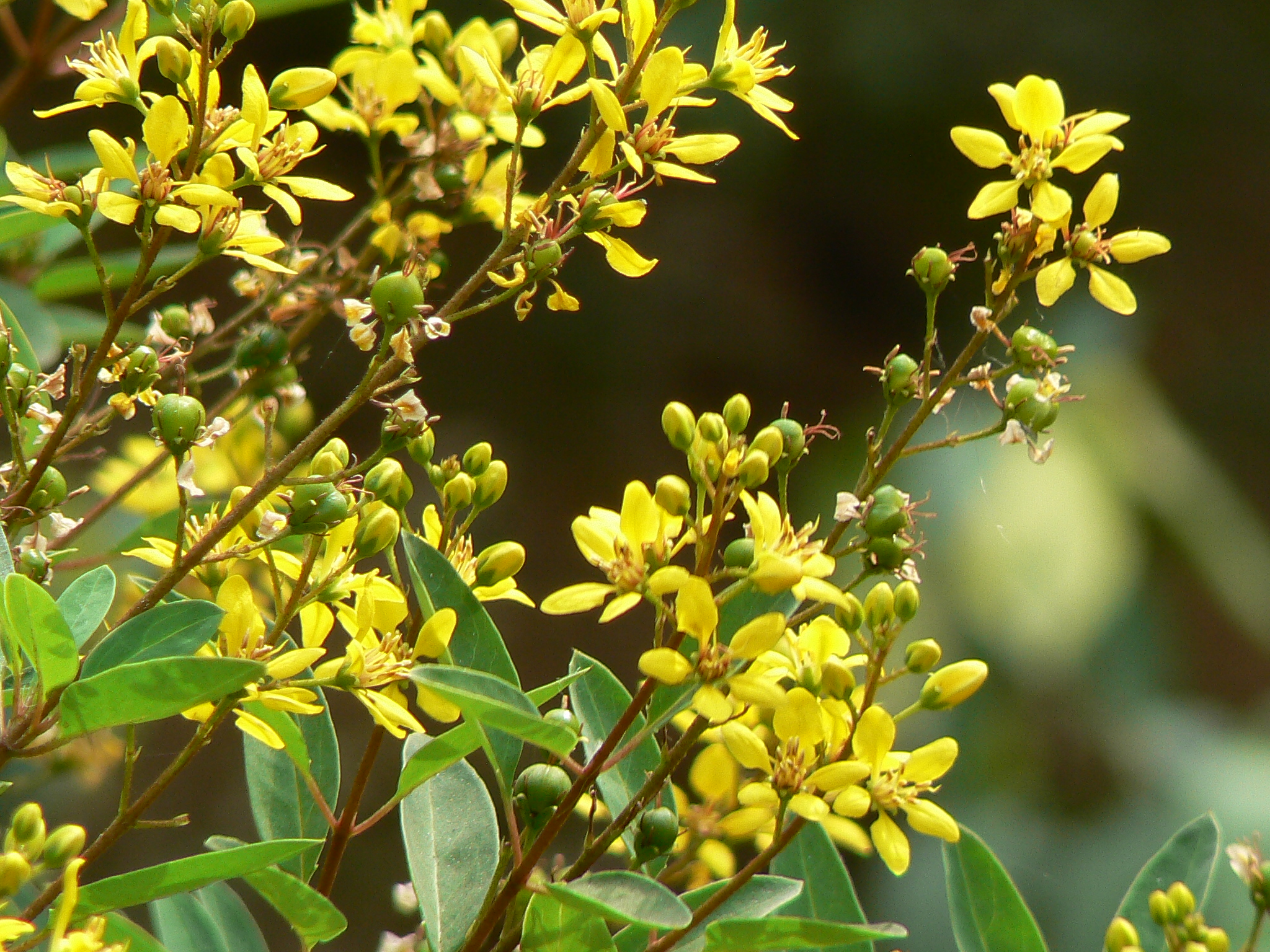
Panicles

== External links and reference ==
- Malpighiaceae Malpighiaceae - description, taxonomy, phylogeny, and nomenclature
- Galphimia
- Thryallis
- Anderson, C. 2007. Revision of Galphimia (Malpighiaceae). Contributions from the University of Michigan Herbarium 25: 1–82.
