= University of Michigan Herbarium =

Herbarium in Ann Arbor, Michigan, U.S.

Coordinates: 42.2364°N 83.7280°W

The University of Michigan Herbarium is the herbarium of the University of Michigan in Ann Arbor, Michigan, in the United States. One of the most-extensive botanical collections in the world, the herbarium has some 1.7 million specimens of vascular plants, algae, bryophytes, fungi, and lichens, and is a valuable resource for teaching and research in biology and botany. The herbarium includes many rare and extinct species.

== Administration ==
Formerly an independent unit of the University of Michigan College of Literature, Science, and the Arts (LSA), the herbarium is now part of the Department of Ecology and Evolutionary Biology within LSA. The herbarium is located at 3600 Varsity Drive in Ann Arbor.

== History ==
The Herbarium's collection was established in 1837. Asa Gray was appointed Professor of Botany and Zoology in 1838. Collections were moved to the Main Building (later Mason Hall) in 1841. The first published research paper based on the university's botanical holdings came in 1877, when a paper by Professor Mark W. Harrington was published in the Botanical Journal of the Linnean Society.

Mycologist Alexander H. Smith spent his entire career at the University of Michigan Herbarium, and was its longtime director.

== Collections ==
Among the 1.7 million specimens held by the herbarium are:

- 96,000 specimens of algae
- 163,000 specimens of bryophytes
- 280,000 specimens of fungi
- 57,000 specimens of lichens
- 1.1 million specimens of vascular plants (excluding pteridophytes)
- 90,000 specimens of pteridophytes
