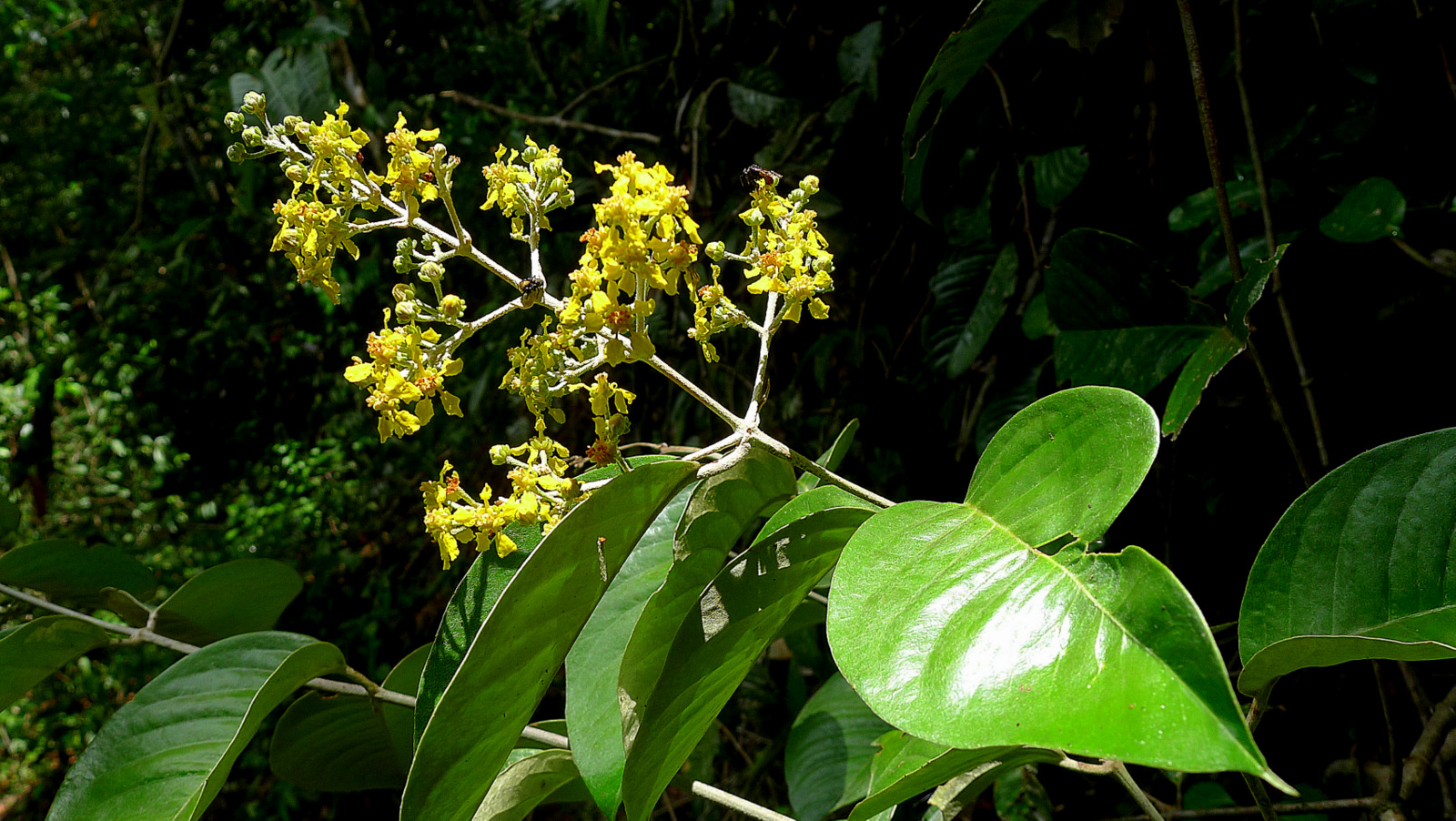
- Niedenzuella sericea in Brazil

Scientific classification
- Kingdom: Plantae
- Clade: Embryophytes
- Clade: Tracheophytes
- Clade: Angiosperms
- Clade: Eudicots
- Clade: Rosids
- Order: Malpighiales
- Family: Malpighiaceae
- Genus: Niedenzuella; W.R.Anderson

Synonyms
- Aenigmatanthera W.R.Anderson

= Niedenzuella =

Genus of flowering plant

Niedenzuella is a genus of flowering plants belonging to the family Malpighiaceae.

Its native range is Southern Tropical America. It is found in the countries of Argentina, Bolivia, Brazil, Colombia, Costa Rica, Ecuador, French Guiana, Guyana, Panamá, Paraguay, Peru, Suriname and Venezuela.

The genus name of Niedenzuella is in honour of Franz Josef Niedenzu (1857–1937), a German botanist born in Köppernig. He is remembered for his work with the botanical family Malpighiaceae. It was first described and published in Novon Vol.16 on page 194 in 2006.

== Species ==
18 species are accepted.

- Niedenzuella acutifolia (Cav.) W.R.Anderson
- Niedenzuella caracasana W.R.Anderson
- Niedenzuella castanea (Cuatrec.) W.R.Anderson
- Niedenzuella doniana (Griseb.) R.F.Almeida
- Niedenzuella glabra (Spreng.) W.R.Anderson
- Niedenzuella lasiandra (A.Juss.) R.F.Almeida
- Niedenzuella leucosepala (Griseb.) W.R.Anderson
- Niedenzuella lucida (A.Juss.) W.R.Anderson
- Niedenzuella mater-dei (Cuatrec.) W.R.Anderson
- Niedenzuella metensis (Cuatrec.) W.R.Anderson
- Niedenzuella mogoriifolia (A.Juss.) W.R.Anderson
- Niedenzuella multiglandulosa (A.Juss.) W.R.Anderson
- Niedenzuella peruviana (Nied.) W.R.Anderson
- Niedenzuella poeppigiana (A.Juss.) W.R.Anderson
- Niedenzuella sericea (A.Juss.) W.R.Anderson
- Niedenzuella stannea (Griseb.) W.R.Anderson
- Niedenzuella suaveolens (A.Juss.) W.R.Anderson
- Niedenzuella warmingiana (Griseb.) W.R.Anderson
