= Ptilochaeta =

Scientific classification
- Kingdom: Plantae
- Clade: Tracheophytes
- Clade: Angiosperms
- Clade: Eudicots
- Clade: Rosids
- Order: Malpighiales
- Family: Malpighiaceae
- Genus: Ptilochaeta; Turcz.

Genus of flowering plants

Ptilochaeta is a genus of plants in the family Malpighiaceae.

Species include:

- Ptilochaeta nudipes Grisebach
