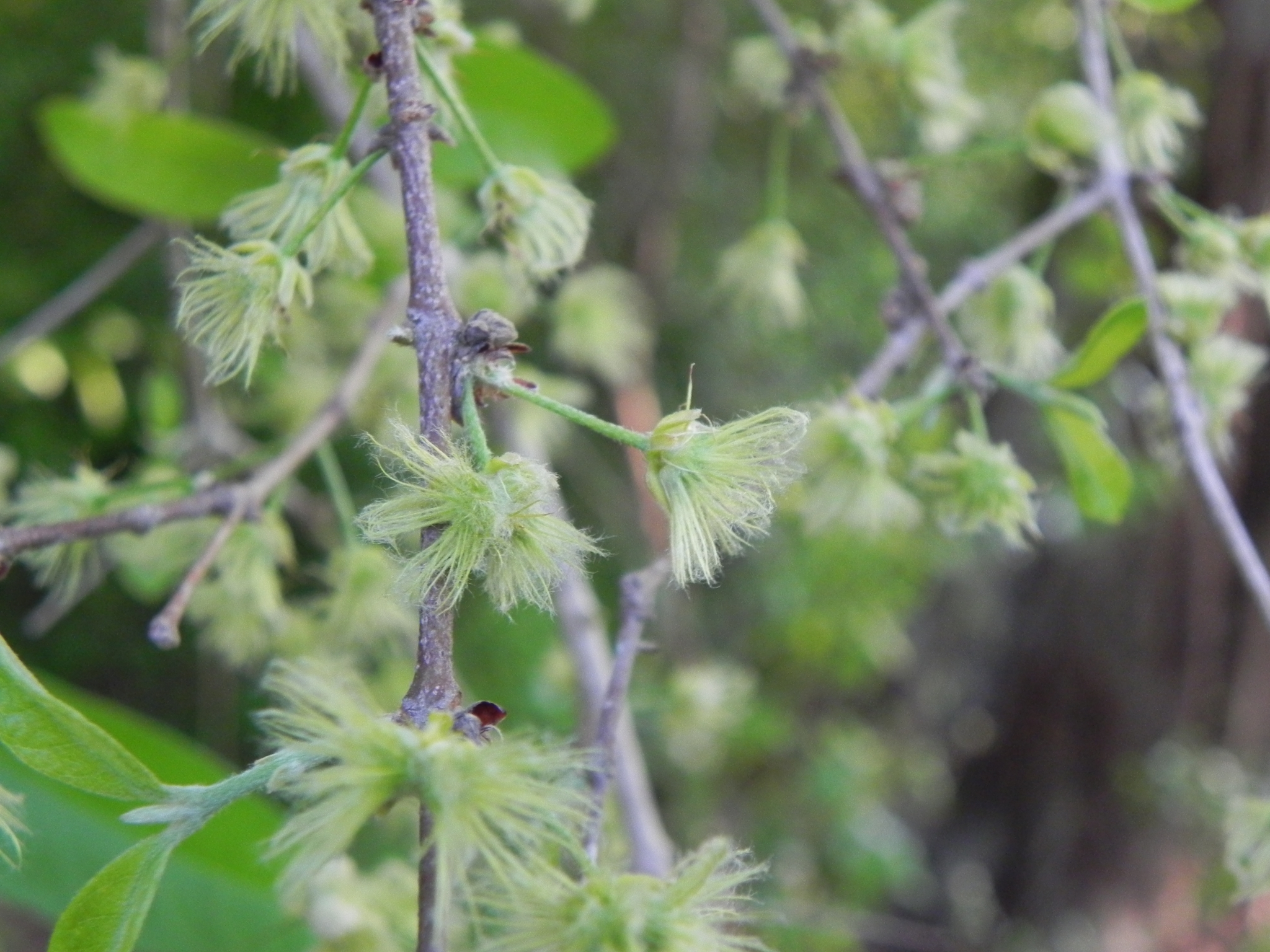

Conservation status
- Vulnerable (IUCN 2.3)

Scientific classification
- Kingdom: Plantae
- Clade: Tracheophytes
- Clade: Angiosperms
- Clade: Eudicots
- Clade: Rosids
- Order: Malpighiales
- Family: Malpighiaceae
- Genus: Ptilochaeta
- Species: P. nudipes

Binomial name
- Ptilochaeta nudipes Griseb.

= Ptilochaeta nudipes =

Species of flowering plant

Ptilochaeta nudipes is a species of flowering plant in the Malpighiaceae family. It is found in Argentina and Bolivia. It is threatened by habitat loss from agricultural activities.
