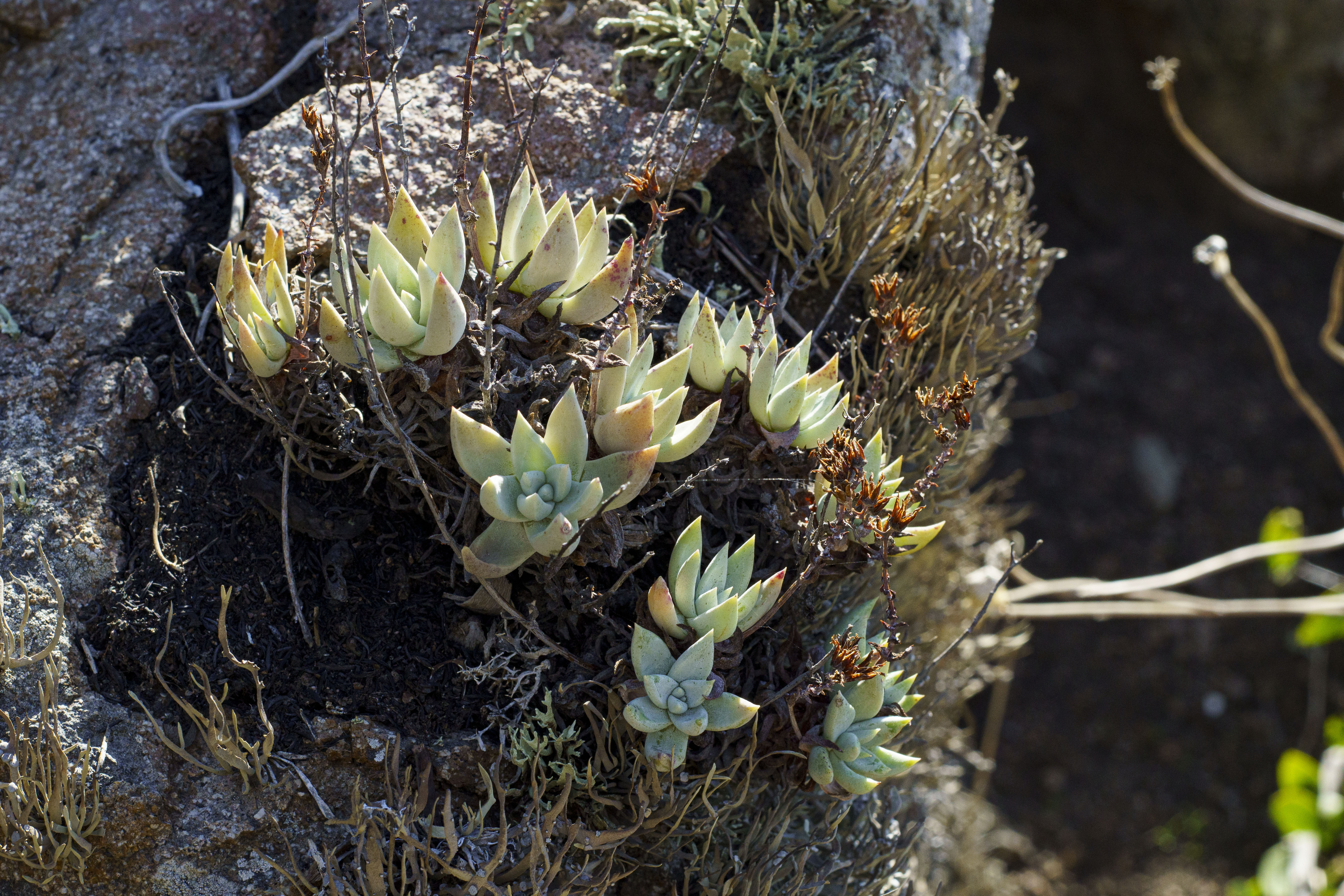

Scientific classification
- Kingdom: Plantae
- Clade: Tracheophytes
- Clade: Angiosperms
- Clade: Eudicots
- Order: Saxifragales
- Family: Crassulaceae
- Genus: Dudleya
- Species: D. campanulata

Binomial name
- Dudleya campanulata Moran
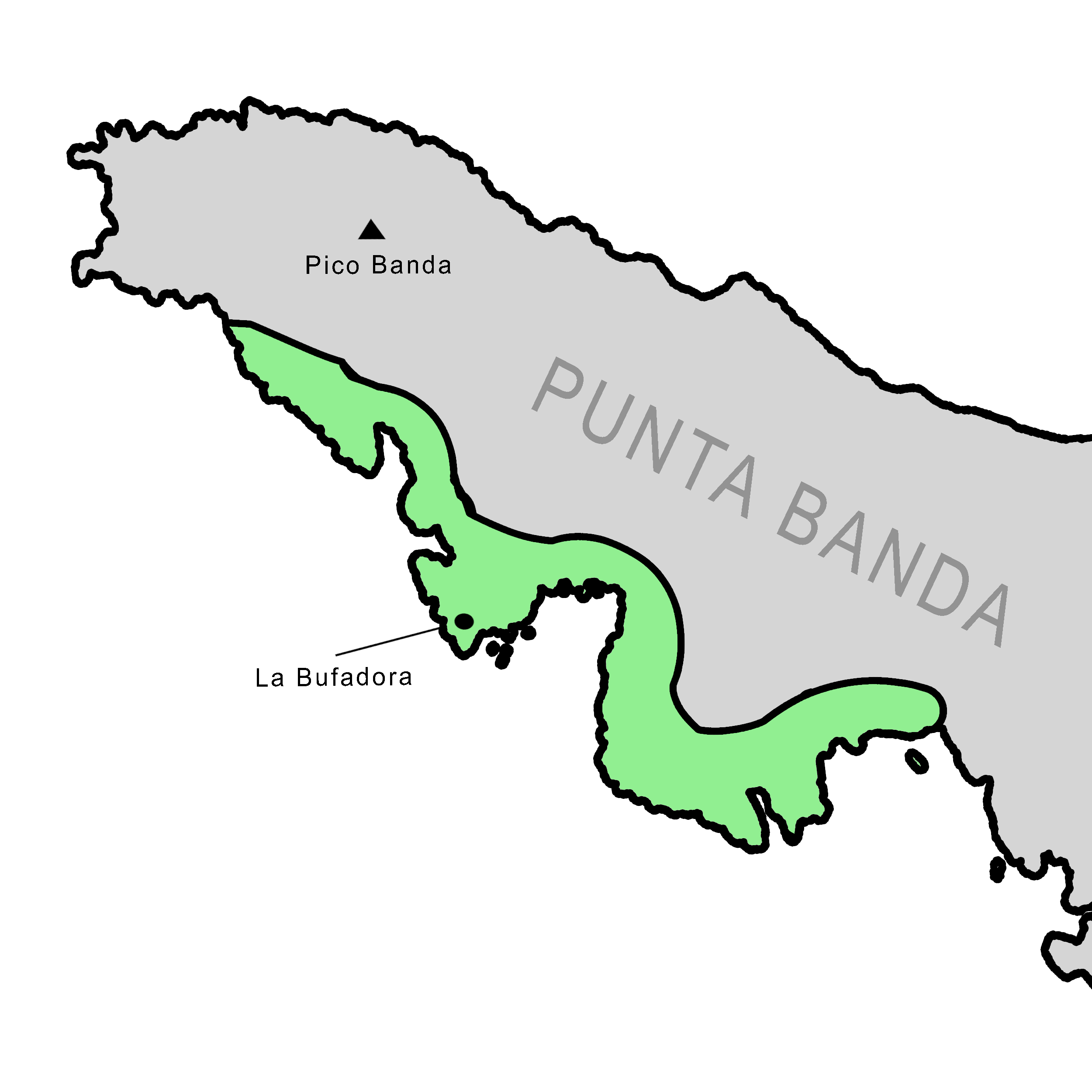
- Distribution of Dudleya campanulata

= Dudleya campanulata =

Succulent plant native to Baja California, Mexico

Dudleya campanulata is a species of perennial succulent plant known by the common name as the Punta Banda liveforever, native to Baja California and endemic to the Punta Banda peninsula, a promontory south of Ensenada that encloses the southern limit of the Bahía de Todos Santos, a deepwater bay. One of many species of Dudleya native to the peninsula and surrounding islands, it is distinguished by its campanulate flowers and its occupation of a narrow habitat that consists of ocean bluffs on the southern end of the Punta Banda, near the well-known blowhole La Bufadora.

== Description ==
The caudex of Dudleya campanulata is 7 to 18 mm thick, clothed with dried foliage, and branched into mound-like clumps of up to 150 rosettes, which are each 3 to 8 cm wide. The rosettes contain 12 to 30 upcurved or erect leaves, with the young leaves being farinose, whilst older leaves are glaucous and tinged with a purple or dull green hue. Leaves are oblong-lanceolate, acute, apiculate, or semiterete, 2 to 4 cm long, 6 to 13 mm wide in the middle, flattish ventrally and rounded dorsally.

Floral stems, to their terminal flower, are 8 to 25 cm tall, 3 to 6 mm thick, reddish and glaucous, and bare in the lower 2 to 5 cm of the stem. Above the bare base of the floral stem, 10 to 25 bracts grow, triangular-ovate, acute, subclasping at base and turgid. Bracts are 6 to 20 mm long, 6 to 9 mm wide, and 2 to 4 mm thick.

The inflorescence is typically obpyramidal 4 to 12 cm wide, composed of 2 to 5 simple or bifurcate ascending branches, with the ultimate uniparous branches 1 to 7 cm long, with 2 to 11 buds or flowers.

On the flowers, the calyx is 3 to 4 mm high, rounded below, with the segments deltoid, acute, and 1.5 to 2 mm long, 2 to 3 mm wide, and united about 0.5 mm. When in bud, the corollas are ovoid, broadly acute, in anthesis narrowly to broadly campanulate. The corolla is 8 to 10 mm long, 3.5 to 5 mm wide at the base, and 10 - 16 mm wide above. Petals are connate around 2 mm, elliptic, acute 8 to 10 mm long, and 3 to 4 mm wide. The petals are colored white or mostly tinged along the keels in pink.

Within the flower, the filaments are white, 6 to 8 mm long from the corolla base, and 0.6 to 0.9 mm wide. Antepetalous stamens are 2.5 to 3mm, whilst antesepalous stamens are 1.5 to 2.5 mm. The anthers are red, 1.6 to 1.8 mm long, and 0.9 mm wide. Nectaries are light orange to white, 1 to 1.5 mm wide, 0.3 to 0.5 mm high and 0.3 to 0.5 mm thick. Gynoecium is greenish white, 5 to 7 mm high, 2.5 to 3.5 mm thick, narrowed at base, the pistils erect but separated to below the middle, connate 1 to 1.5mm, tapering to styles about 2 mm long. There are 15 to 25 ovules which are 0.7 to 0.9 mm long, and 0.2 to 0.3 mm thick.

Seeds are red-brown and fusiform, measuring about 1 mm long and 0.3 mm thick, with about 15 to 18 prominent longitudinal striations.

Compared to D. anomala, a member of the same genus with overlapping range, they resemble each other superficially, especially in their inflorescences; however, D. anomala is one of the few viscid species of Dudleya, and has apple-green, shiny leaves.

== Taxonomy ==
The first specimen was collected by Don Skinner of Los Angeles in July 1935, labeled Stylophyllum No. 2, the identity of the plant remained a mystery. The young botanist Reid Moran collected notes and photos of the plant, but because the source remained unknown, he was unable to publish it as a species nova. Over 40 years later, in May of 1977, while documenting the flora of the Punta Banda peninsula, Moran rediscovered the unknown plant growing on the bluffs. Moran believed it was an example of D. virens subsp hassei, until his observations of the floral stems reminded him of Stylophyllum No. 2. In 1978, Moran described the new species in an issue of the Cactus & Succulent Journal of America.

Tom Mulroy, a researcher of Dudleya in Baja California, had previously mentioned the plants prior to Moran's description, regarding them as an unusual form of Dudleya anomala.

Taxa in the genus Dudleya frequently hybridize with each other in the wild and under cultivation, giving rise to many natural nothospecies. Moran, who described the species, held a theory that D. campanulata may be a hybrid related to D. attenuata, D. virens subsp hassei and a member of the Dudleya subgenera. Indeed, bell-shaped campanulate flowers are only found in hybrids between Dudleya and the subgenera Stylophyllum.

D. campanulata has a gametic chromosome number of n=68. It is octoploid.

== Distribution and habitat ==
Dudleya campanulata is endemic to the Cape Punta Banda, a promontory that shelters the southern limit of the Todos Santos Bay, a deepwater bay with the city of Ensenada along its coast. D. campanulata occupies a very local area, restricted to the igneous ocean cliffs facing the west to the Pacific Ocean and sea stacks on the southern side of the cape. Other species of Dudleya occur on the Punta Banda and the surrounding vicinity, some of which freely hybridize with each other. Dudleya anomala is one of these very niche Dudleyas occurring in the vicinity, albeit it represents a rare mainland occurrence of an insular species from Todos Santos Island.

== See also ==
Other Dudleya of the Punta Banda and Northern Mexican Pacific Islands:

- Dudleya anomala
- Dudleya anthonyi
- Dudleya attenuata
- Dudleya brittonii
- Dudleya candida
- Dudleya cultrata
- Dudleya lanceolata
- Dudleya × semiteres
