= Invasive species in Mexico =

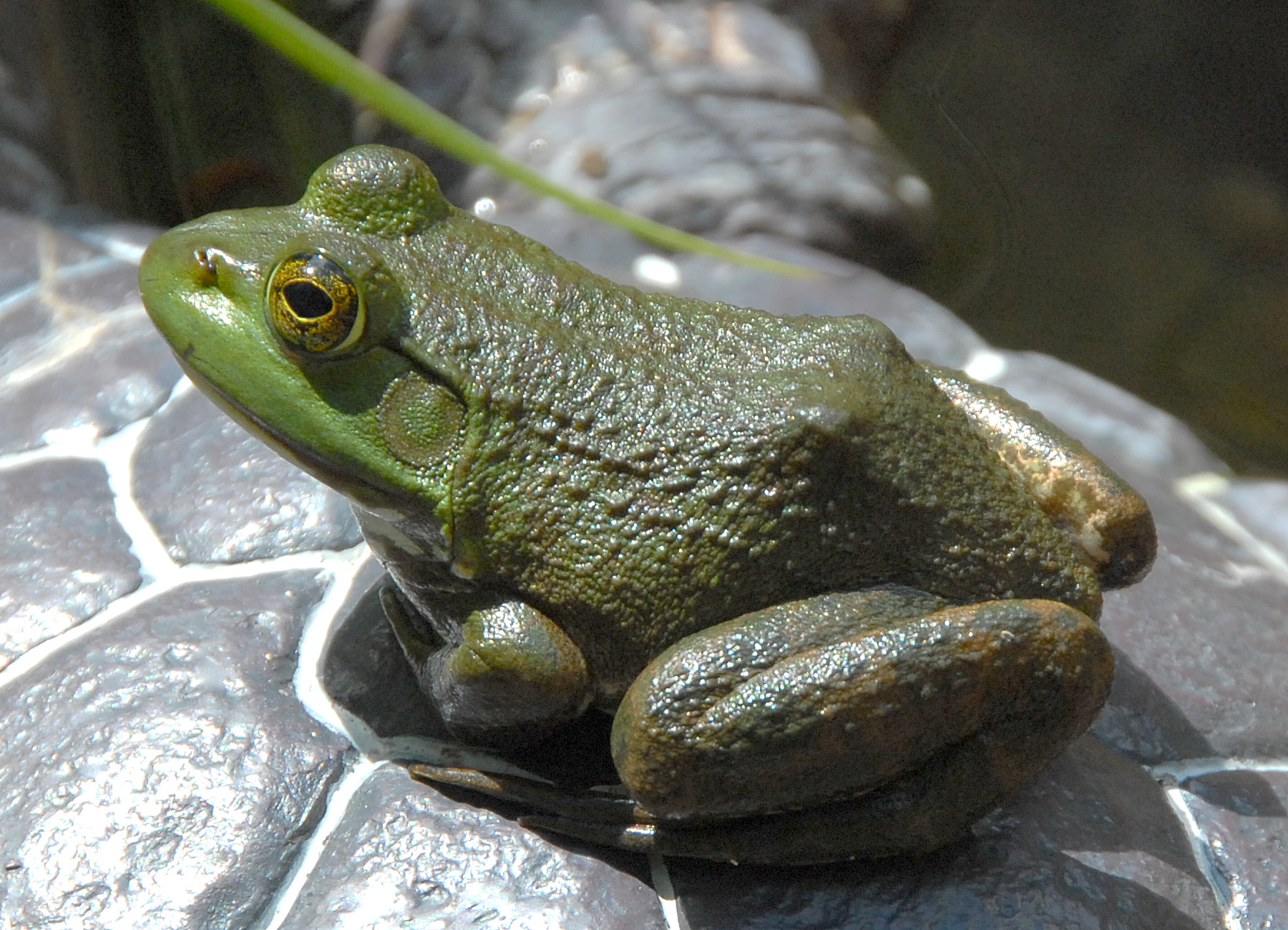
The American bullfrog, Rana catesbeiana is an invasive species in Mexico.

Invasive species are a major cause of biodiversity loss in Mexico, altering ecosystems, affecting native species, damaging environmental services and public health, and causing economic losses. An invasive species is one native to a particular area that has been introduced into a new habitat, adapting and altering to suit its new conditions.

Due to its geography, a convergence of Nearctic and Neotropical regions, Mexico is a megadiverse country, with a high number of species. This has favored the existence of a considerable number of habitats with diversely distant species which inhabit various aquatic and terrestrial ecosystems. Economic, social and cultural exchange between Mexico and other countries has facilitated the entry of exotic and invasive species.

== Terrestrial animals ==
In Mexico the effects of invasive species has been documented since the arrival of the Europeans. Colonization brought about the systematic introduction of animals for economic purposes, but also the occasional arrival of unwanted visitors that became pests (Challenger, 1998). On account of these problematic intruders, many ecosystems were being impoverished and many species driven to extinction. There are three divisions:

- Exotic species (introduced or non-native): a species established outside its natural area in differing timescales and potential spread, outside the area it occupied naturally, or that could not continue without human intervention (CBD, 2009 area; IUCN, 2000;)
- Invasive exotic species: a non-native species or population outside its natural range, which is able to survive, reproduce and become established in natural habitats and ecosystems and threaten native biodiversity, economy and public health (DOF, 2010)
- Invasive species: an exotic species is established in natural or semi-natural habitats or ecosystems, an agent of change that threatens native biodiversity (CBD, 2009)

Not all exotic species become invasive immediately, and potential effects of a non-native species are unpredictable (DET). The problems related to invasive exotic species are complex and vast, the biggest obstacle being that it is a little-known and underestimated topic.

=== On Mexican islands ===
Island biodiversity is vulnerable to introduced species, because in these environments there is a high proportion of endemic species that lack defense mechanisms against exotic species with which they did not co-evolve. In particular, for island birds the risk of extinction is forty times higher than for continental species. It is the leading cause of biodiversity loss in that region.

62% of mammals, 88% of birds, 54% of amphibians, 86% of reptiles and 68% of mollusks that have been reported extinct are island species. On Mexican islands 12% of endemic birds and 20% of endemic mammals have become extinct because of introduced species. Over the last decade forty populations of introduced mammals have been eradicated on 28 islands, a step toward the conservation of over a hundred endemic species and subspecies that inhabit the islands. One exemplary result is the Gulf Islands of California, where the initiative of some individuals and civil society organizations is supported by an inter-institutional collaboration and international cooperation.

=== Guadalupe Island ===
Guadalupe Island is a volcano with a height of 5800 m. Its surface area is approximately 250 km². It is a center of endemism with 34 species of plants, including two classes (Redman and Moran, 1997); eight land birds; one sea bird; eleven land snails; and at least 18 species of insects (Gonzales, 1981). The island is an important breeding site for marine mammals such as the Guadalupe fur seal (Arctocephalus townsendi), elephant seal (Mirounga angustirostris), and numerous species of birds, including the Laysan albatross (Phoebastria immutabilis).

In the nineteenth century, goats were introduced, reducing tree coverage of pine, cypress, juniper and oak palm to only 6% of their original coverage. Feral cats caused the extinction of six bird species, and threaten the permanence of large populations of native birds.

Eradication of goats started in 2003, concluding successfully in 2006. Confirmatory monitoring took place from 2007-2009. Following the eradication, for the first time in over 150 years germination and survival of tree species was recorded, more than 130,000 in 2009, as well as observation of six native species believed extinct or extirpated from the island. The project for environmental restoration of Guadalupe Island, coupled with advances in other islands, has national and global significance, placing Mexico as an international leader in the conservation of ecosystems.

=== Feral cats ===
Cats are associated with humans as a communal species, and impact an area of 5 km around each center of human population. Their presence is particularly important in oceanic islands (CONABIO, 2008), where they are the predator with the greatest impact on seabird populations. Some examples of species that have been reduced almost to extinction are the Mexican shearwater (Puffinus opisthomelas), Cassin's auklet (Ptychoramphus aleuticus), and Xantus's murrelet (Synthliboramphus hypoleucus). Extinct species include the Guadalupe storm petrel (Oceanodroma macrodactyla), the Socorro dove (Zenaida graysoni) and an endemic sparrow of Todos Santos Island (Aimophila ruficeps sanctorum).

Cats are a risk factor for the populations of many endemic rodents, like the Chaetodipus anthonyi and Peromyscus interparietalis mice, as well as the Neotoma bryanti rat, and the extinction of the Neotoma anthonyi and Neotoma martinensis endemic rats. It is possible that Peromyscus guardia has become extinct due to the introduction of cats in Ángel de la Guarda Island (, CONABIO 2008). The feral cat has also reduced the rabbit population (Sylvilagus bachmani cerrosensis) on Cedros Island. Cats are one of the most important risk factors for waterfowl populations of Ángel de la Guarda Island, San Marcos, Carmen, Santa Catalina and Cerralvo (Velarde and Anderson, 1994). Cats also carry and transmit numerous diseases and parasites, some of which can be transmitted to humans (CONABIO, 2008).

=== Introduction of non-native bees ===
The introduction of pollinating bumblebees (Bombus) significantly affected native pollinators and both native and introduced plants. The introduced bees are highly pollinating, are abundant in invaded areas, and in some cases, dominate the communities in which they live. In general, they acquire resources more efficiently than native species, despite using the same flowers; they are mutually exclusive both spatially and temporally, suggesting potential competition with native species.

Colonies of B. impatiens, originally from the northeast United States, have been imported to Mexico. B. terrestris, a species native to Europe, North Africa, and Asia was introduced in other areas as a pollinator of commercial crops.

=== Introduction of geckos ===
The common house gecko (Hemidactylus frenatus) (Dumeril & Bibron 1836) synonymous with H. nigriventris, also known as house gecko or bridled house gecko, is native to the islands of the Pacific Ocean. It is currently found throughout the tropics of the Old World and is distributed discontinuously in Central America. Its introduction was probably accidental and repeated, as a stowaway on commercial cargo ships coming from the Pacific Islands. This gecko could potentially have a negative effect on local populations of other gecko species, either because their nocturnal eating habits may be similar, or because adult geckos can prey on juveniles of other lizards and even their own kind. Under specific conditions, they may be vectors of disease or parasites to the native fauna.

=== Amphibia ===
The American bullfrog (Lithobates catesbeianus) is native to Canada and the eastern United States, and was introduced in the early 1900s to Colorado and California. The first records of the species in Mexico date from 1853. It is a very aggressive species and an unspecialized predator, which has a negative impact on the populations of virtually any animal it can capture or ingest. Its introduction has caused the extinction of native amphibians. One can anticipate a negative effect on native vertebrate and invertebrate populations, aquatic and terrestrial, in any location. This problem has been known for thirty years. The species is considered among the 100 most important invasive exotic species at a global level. The main concern is due to the potential it has to compete with and prey on other species.

=== Reptiles ===
Japanese and red-eared turtles (Trachemys scripta) are native to the country and sold in many pet stores, in most cases released when the owners see the size at which they reach adulthood. The turtle is considered one of the 100 most dangerous invasive species by the Specialist Group on Invasive Species of the IUCN for its omnivorous diet and being inclined to compete with other species of turtles for basking places, besides being an important vector of potentially harmful pathogens for humans and other species (Bringsoe, 2006). Trade of this species should be regulated more effectively to urge the public not to release their pets in nature when they no longer want to be responsible for them.

=== Urban environments ===
Several invasive bird species are found in urban areas. The house sparrow (Passer domesticus) was originally distributed in the Middle East to the Mediterranean region, and was introduced in 1850 in North America. It competes for food and nesting sites with other species. The rock dove (Columba livia) is native to Europe and has been introduced worldwide. It causes damage to buildings and transmits diseases to other species. Similarly, the monk parakeet (Myiopsitta monachus) is native to Argentina and Uruguay and is a recognized pest of crops. It is easily adapted to urban environments so it has high demand as a pet in Mexico. People unaware of the potential damage liberate and help feed them, as well as pigeons and house sparrows.

== Terrestrial plants ==
Invasive plants are fast-growing pioneer species that take advantage of disturbed areas to colonize bare soil. Once established, they inhibit seed germination or development of native species, and can dominate the vegetation, preventing the disturbed ecosystem from restoring itself.

In Mexico there are various efforts to identify and monitor invasive plants. CONABIO (2015) listed 145 species and established a monitoring network. It also created a hierarchy of species' invasiveness according to their ability to spread, their establishment, and their impact on biodiversity (UNIBIO, s.a.). Subsequent date produced by the network UNIBIO (s.a.) listed 226 invasive species across Mexico, of which 2% have a degree of "extreme invasiveness", 46% "high invasiveness", and 15% "moderate invasiveness". Combining these three categories, there are a total of 184 species identified as invasive plants.

Invasive species with an extreme degree of invasiveness identified by the Network are:

1. Eucalyptus globulus
2. Ricinus communis
3. Pennisetum clandestinum
4. Eragrostis lehmanniana
5. Cenchrus ciliaris
6. Rhynchelytrum repens
7. Tamarix ramosissima

Of these 7 species, 4 belong to the grass family (Poaceae). This group contains the largest number of invasive plants in Mexico, with 82 species of 226 total registered so far. The family with the second highest number of invasive species is the Asteraceae with 14 species, and joint third and fourth are the Fabaceae and Brassicaceae, containing 12 species each (UNIBIO, s.a.).

=== Distribution ===
According to monitoring conducted by the UNIBIO (s.a.), there are invasive species in all states of the Republic. Significantly, all of them except Guerrero, Tabasco and Baja California Sur have at least one species classified as extremely invasive, and all of them have highly invasive species. Related to that geographic distribution, ecosystems have also been identified that have a higher number of invasive plant species. The most affected ecosystem is the Tropical Deciduous Forest, followed by Ripario and the Aquatic. Less affected ecosystems are Sarco Scrub, Misty, and Savannah, followed by Low Evergreen Forest (UNIBIO, s.a.).

=== Causes of increased invasive species ===
Today the threat has increased and incidences of invasive plants in Mexico is caused by two factors. Firstly, the increase of invasive plants is attributed to a parallel increase in disturbed areas in the country, caused by logging and a growing number of abandoned pastures. The second is the introduction of exotic species to the territory by human activity, either voluntarily or involuntarily. Of the exotic species in Mexico, only a small percentage becomes invasive, which occurs when the plant is a "free-niche", or "a type of habitat that was not used by a native plant".

=== Introduction of Eucalyptus globulus ===
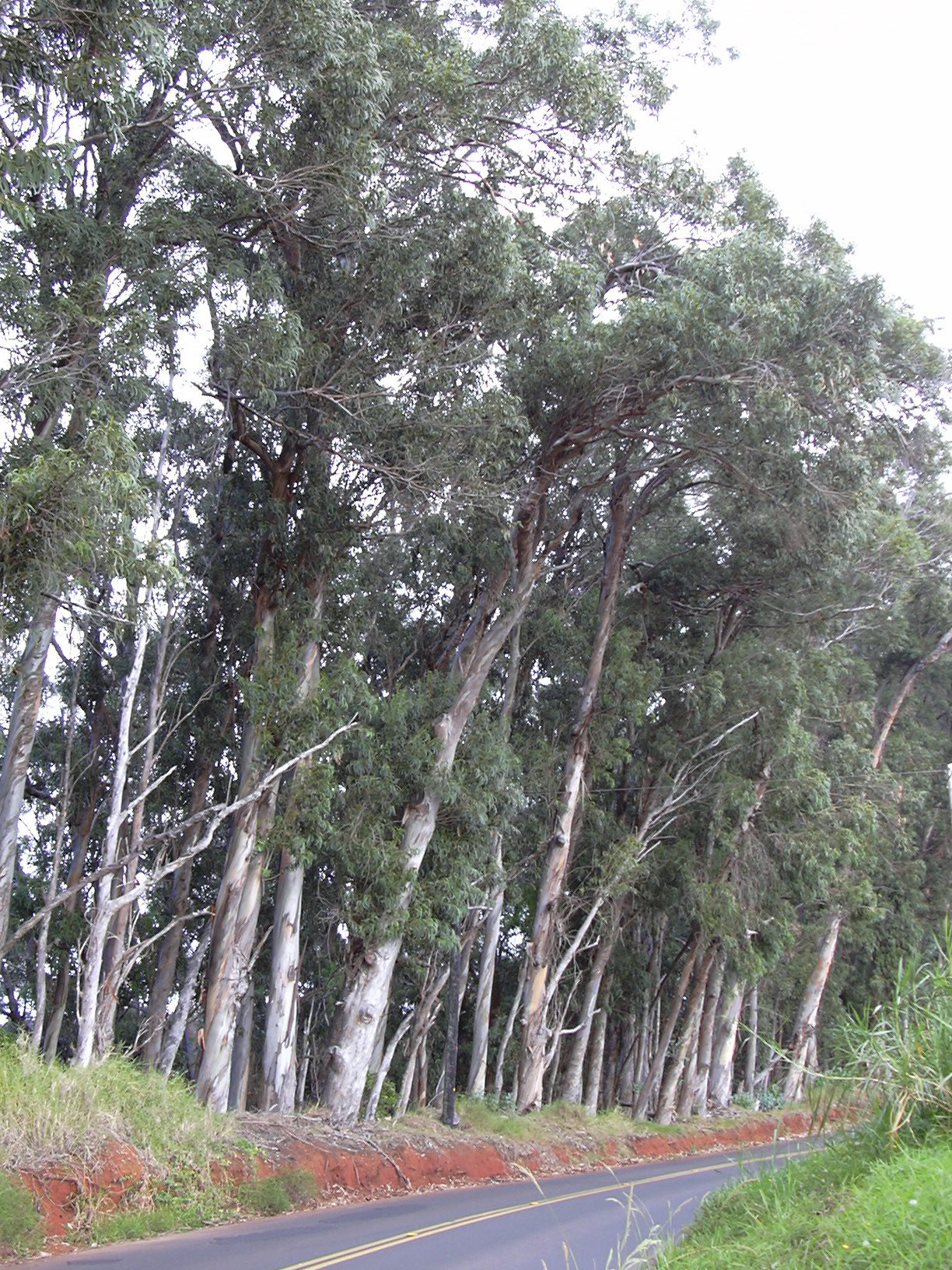
Eucalyptus globulus

Eucalyptus globulus was introduced to Mexico for various reasons, one of which was as a strategy of "cleaning up" the valley of Mexico and reducing cases of Malaria. Eucalyptus globulus was brought to Mexico since it had a history of being successfully employed for this kind of sanitation in Spain and Italy in the last third of the past century, as well as for its possible medical uses.

The high distribution of Eucalyptus in Mexico dates from the 1990s, when the government of Mexico, along with large companies, promoted large-scale tree plantations in order to promote a domestic paper industry. For these purposes, and because of its rapid growth, high adaptability, and quality of cellulose fibers, plantations of several species of eucalyptus have been encouraged, including Eucalyptus globulus in Mexican territory.

The case of Eucalyptus globulus is a clear example of how human action contributed to the presence of invasive species in Mexico. According to data produced by the UNIBIO Monitoring Network (s.a.), it is one of the 7 extremely invasive species in Mexico.

== Aquatic ==
The ecosystems most affected by the presence of invasive marine species are islands and inland waters. Freshwater ecosystems are very rich in plants and animals relative to the extent of the habitat. They can be considered the most threatened ecosystems in the world due to the much faster rate at which biodiversity is lost.

By the end of the 19th century, 123 species had been declared extinct in North America. In reality many species of fish, mollusks, crustaceans and amphibians are considered threatened at some level, and it is calculated that half of freshwater mussels, a third of prawns, a fourth of amphibians and a fifth of fish will have disappeared by the year 2100. Today approximately 39% of freshwater fish in the American continent are threatened to some degree, including 230 vulnerable species, 190 threatened, 280 in danger, and 61 extinct or removed from their natural habitat. In 2008 Molnar et al. showed that at most 16% of the marine ecoregions of the world have no report of invasive species. The ecological impacts depend on the type of species, the magnitude of the invasion, and the vulnerability of the invaded ecosystem. Loss and degradation of biodiversity can occur from a genetic level to a systemic one, causing alterations to habitats, fundamental ecological properties of the ecosystem, chemical characteristics of the water, biogeochemical processes, and trophic nets. These impacts vary in the time lapse between the initial introduction and the subsequent dispersion of the invasive species, the severity of the impact, feasibility of synergistic interactions with other threatening processes and the potential for starting a cascade of ramifications in the whole ecosystem.

Oftentimes invasive species increase rapidly because of the absence of natural predators, which leads to a loss of native species. They have caused the extinction of 48-62% of the species of fish in the world (Pimentel et al., 2000). In Mexico, of 506 species of freshwater fish, 169 are at risk and 25 are extinct. The states most affected are Nuevo León and Coahuila, and the principal causes are the reduction or alteration of habitat, loss of water, and introduction of foreign species. On occasion, foreign species are introduced by the government. In Mexico, carp and tilapia were introduced by the Secretary of Fishing (; Contreras Balderas, 1999). In addition to the danger they pose to native fauna, these species bring impacts on the structure and function of the ecosystem. The registry of coypu (Myocastor coypus) in the Bravo River, the same species that has caused damage to the agriculture and riverbeds of the rivers in Italy, reaches 2.8 million dollars each year. Some invasive species can distinctly affect fisheries, as with lampreys, the control of which caused losses of more than 500 million dollars per year. The Salvinia molesta and the water lily (Eichhornia crassipes) can impede navigation.

Some invasive species bring sanitary problems to human health. Species that are pathogens or parasites that cause direct harm, or that act as carriers for such species, can have serious consequences. Pathogen carriers are species like the snail Melanoides tuberculata, which has displaced native species in Nuevo León (Contreras-Arquieta y Contreras-Balderas, 1999). Due to its high reproductive potential (as a parthenogenic species), it modifies the conditions of the habitat, and it carries trematoda such as Clonorchis sinensis, a parasite that can damage the human liver. Pathogens that cause direct harm include the harmful algal bloom (HAB) and the red tides that have intensified in frequency and duration in aquatic environments across the world. The proliferation of HABs creates dead zones that use up all available oxygen. Certain species even produce toxins that damage the digestive and nervous systems of humans and many animals. For example, lionfish (Pterois volitans and Pterois miles) are predators that affect species of fish and invertebrates in reefs and mangrove swamps of the Gulf of Mexico, such as the grouper and the northern red snapper that are of great economic importance. These species of lionfish are also venomous, making them dangerous to many species including humans.

The displacement of native charal (genus chirostoma) by two species of centralized foreign invaders, the black bass (Micropterus salmoides) and the bluegill (Lepomis macrochirus), is the subject of a case study on prey in the Bravo Valley, State of Mexico. Fish of the family Atherinopsidae and genus chirostoma are known as charal and silversides. Charal are a small fish while silversides are much larger (up to 20 cm). All chirostoma are endemic to the Mexican plateaus and are freshwater species. It is estimated that 18 to 20 species and various subspecies exist in the central mesa of Mexico. Charal have economic, cultural and environmental importance for Mexicans. They have been consumed in this area since pre-Spanish times, but are noticeably shrinking in the last decades, as overexploitation of bodies of water, overfishing, and the introduction of foreign species such as the black bass and bluegill are permitted in their habitats.

In reality charal are in danger of extinction from a conjunction of factors. Since 1900 the extent of lakes in central Mexico has notably decreased, degrading habitats (Alcocer y Escobar 1996). High demand has caused overfishing, excessive exploitation has focused on all classes and sizes. Species introduced in freshwater systems exert pressure on other species. Native species are displaced by direct competition, predators, transmission of illnesses, modification of the habitat and trophic alterations to the community.

The black bass is considered one of the top 100 most damaging invasive species, targeting native species of small fish as prey and resulting in the decline of populations or even their extinction. The black bass and the bluegill coexist in their natural distribution as predator and prey in Mexico and both have been introduced in bodies of water inhabited by charal (Lacepède, 1802 y Lepomis machrochirus, Rafinesque, 1819). When the black bass reaches 120 mm it preys upon the charal. In the reservoir of Bravo Valley, smaller bass and bluegills eat the same food as the charal, and with the rate at which the bass grows, the charal becomes their main diet. Although the bass and bluegill play a predator-prey role elsewhere, the black bass prefers other species that are not prepared to face it, as is the case with the charal (Gallardo-Torres. et al., s/a). Therefore, charal have been hunted intensely by the black bass while having to face the competition of the bluegill to obtain food, which has led to a noticeable dwindling of their population.

One of the principal forms in which invasive aquatic species are introduced is the ballast water of boats. The ballast water is contained in tanks within boats with the purpose of stabilizing the ship during a voyage. This water is later unloaded by the boat before arriving at its destination. Experts agree that 10 to 14 billion tons of ballast water are transferred from one place to another and around 7,000 species are transported every day. Numerous experts believe that the ballast water used in voyages is key to the introduction of these species globally.

== Public policies for control and management ==
The States utilize diverse mediums toward the creation of specialized legislation, environmental institutions, and global strategies, toward the celebration of an accordance or national conventions.

=== Legislation and international standards ===
Within the international context there has been a series of accords signed that bring to light the prospects of invasive species. On one side is the Convention on Biological Diversity (CBD, 1993), and its derivative the Cartagena Protocol on Biosafety (2003), which were not signed by the United States. On the other side, within the background of the CBD, is the International Plant Protection Convention, administered by the United Nations' Food and Agriculture Organization (FAO). The United Nations Convention on the Law of the Sea (UNCLOS, 1983). The Convention on Wetlands signed in Ramsar, Iran, in 1971. The Convention on International Trade in Endangered Species of Wild Fauna and Flora (CITES, 1992). The Agreement on the Application of Sanitary and Phytosanitary Measures from the World Trade Organization. The International Convention for the Control and Management of Ships' Ballast Water and Sediments was adopted in 2004 by the International Maritime Organization and defines in Article 1 the management of ballast water. In North America the North American Agreement on Environmental Cooperation is relevant, derived from the parallel environmental agreement of the North American Free Trade Agreement, which is important in promoting the investigation and development of inventories of invasive species, in the generation of directives for risk analysis of aquatic invasive species, as with the analysis of paths of invasion (CCA, 2013).

There exists a diversity of legal instruments for health, natural resources, or environments, of organic and fiscal character, from which some can contribute to resolving the problem of invasive species in the legal field with the essential participation of non-governmental participants. Nevertheless, there also exist two great legislations that construct the international status quo:

- The European Union (commission of European communities, 2008) has a number of directives such as the Directive of Plant Health (2000/29/CE) charged with the prevention of the introduction of invasive species; directives about protection of nature (79/409/CEE and 92/43/CEE) that prohibit the introduction of species that could constitute a threat to indigenous species; the directive setting the framework for water (2000/60/CE) that calls for the member states to maintain a good ecological state in the waters to which it applies; and the directive setting the framework for marine strategy (2008/56/CE). It has a veterinary legislation that can apply to the vectors of illness in animals. There also exists a law about the commerce of wild fauna and flora (CE) advice number 338/97, the law (CE) advice number 708/2007 about the use of exotic species. In addition the LIFE Program provides help to projects for the control and eradication of invasive species.
- The Convention on Biological Diversity has established priorities and directives, recompiled information, and helped coordinate international actions related to foreign invasive species. It is governed through these guiding principles:

A. General

1. focus on precaution
2. hierarchic focus in 3 steps
3. focus on ecosystems
4. responsibility of the state
5. investigation and supervision
6. education and public consciousness

B. Prevention

1. border control and quarantine measures
2. information exchange
3. cooperation, including the creation of capacity

C. Introduction of Species

1. deliberate introduction
2. involuntary introduction

D. Reducing Impact

1. reducing impact
2. eradication
3. contention
4. control

=== Mexican legislation ===
International treaties celebrated by Mexico in agreement with the Constitution are signed by the executive, approved by the Senate, and published in the Diario Oficial de la Federación (DOF), the Official Journal of the Federation, which along with the Constitution and the federal laws is the Supreme Law of the Union. They have full force and can be applied directly to the interior rights of the country (Segob 2014: art. 133 y 76 en Herrera, et al., 2014).

The institutional federal view on the topic of invasive species in Mexico consists of: SAGARPA (the Secretariat of Agriculture and Fisheries) through General Coordination of Livestock, Undersecretary of Agriculture and Undersecretary of Rural Development, SINASICA, CONAPESCA (the National Aquaculture and Fishing Commission), Inapesca (a division of SAGARPA), and INIFAP, the Instituto Nacional de Investigaciones Forestales, Agrícolas y Pecuarias (National Institution of Forest, Agriculture, and Fish Investigations). SEMARNAT (the Secretariat of Environment and Natural Resources) works alongside the DGVS, DGGFS and DGIRA, CONAFOR, INECC, CONANP, PROFEPA and CONABIO.

Other dependencies with direct participation in the topic are the Secretary of Communication and Transportation, the Secretary of National Defense, and the Secretary of the Marine.

Mexican legislation comprises a series of legal instruments related to invasive species: the Federal Law of Animal Health, the Federal Law of Plant Health, the General Law of Ecologic Equilibrium and Environmental Protection, the General Law of Wildlife, the General Law of Federal Development, the General Law of Fish and Sustainable Aquaculture, and the Law of Biosecurity of Genetically Modified Organisms. Since 2010 the Mexican government has promoted the National Strategy of Invasive Species, which provided a guide for different social actors to confront invasive species, although barely consolidating the strength to monitor the goals and achievements it raised, since within the components of the National Strategy emerging factors such as hybridization and climate change still have not been considered.

Within the given strategies, CONABIO has established the Invasive Species Program, which represents a national database on the foreign species with invasive potential, as much for those that are established as those that have yet to settle and represent a risk to the country.

=== Measures ===
Invasive aquatic species are considered an important challenge because of their destructive capacity and negative effect on biological diversity, particularly in the marine world. International law, through international agreements and global institutional strategies, searches to lessen this problem.

National, regional, and international organisms combine efforts to carry out the application of the International Convention for the Control and Management of Ships' Ballast Water and Sediments adopted in 2004, that to date has been ratified by 30 countries. This represents only 35% of the global fleet. Its ratification would facilitate prevention with respect to the organisms introduced as stowaways in the body or ballast water of ships.

The International Accords treat the challenge of invasive aquatic species in parts, which occasionally overlap. Even if the international strategies of the CCA, the code FAO, and the UICN represent important efforts and have the potential to direct the United States and support them, technically to identify and combat invasive aquatic species, they lack obligation.

With respect to the implementation of the CBD toward invasive aquatic species, in the last report Mexico indicated that a group of intersectoral work had been formed to address the topic. In addition, it demonstrated that they were working on a program to identify the marine and coastal species. The fourth Mexican national report (CONABIO and Semarnat 2009) also informed that they had identified a total of 811 species, including vascular and terrestrial plants with invasive potential as well as aquatic and marine plants. This figure could be underestimated.

With respect to the impact of regional efforts in North America in the forum of the CCA, these are not centered specifically on controlling and combating aquatic invasive species. However, it has taken directives for the evaluation of risk of foreign aquatic invasive species, with the objective to serve as support in high level decisions of each member country of the agreement, essentially focused on reverting the complication that brought invasive species into the aquatic ecosystem.

Between the normative adjustments that could serve to enforce and harmonize the most relevant provisions of force to attend to the problem of invasive species in an aquatic environment is the publication of a secretarial accord with the list of foreign invasive species predicted in the General Law of Wildlife, as in the elaboration of a draft of secretarial accord for the formalization and organization of work in a technical committee, for publication in the official journal of the federation.
