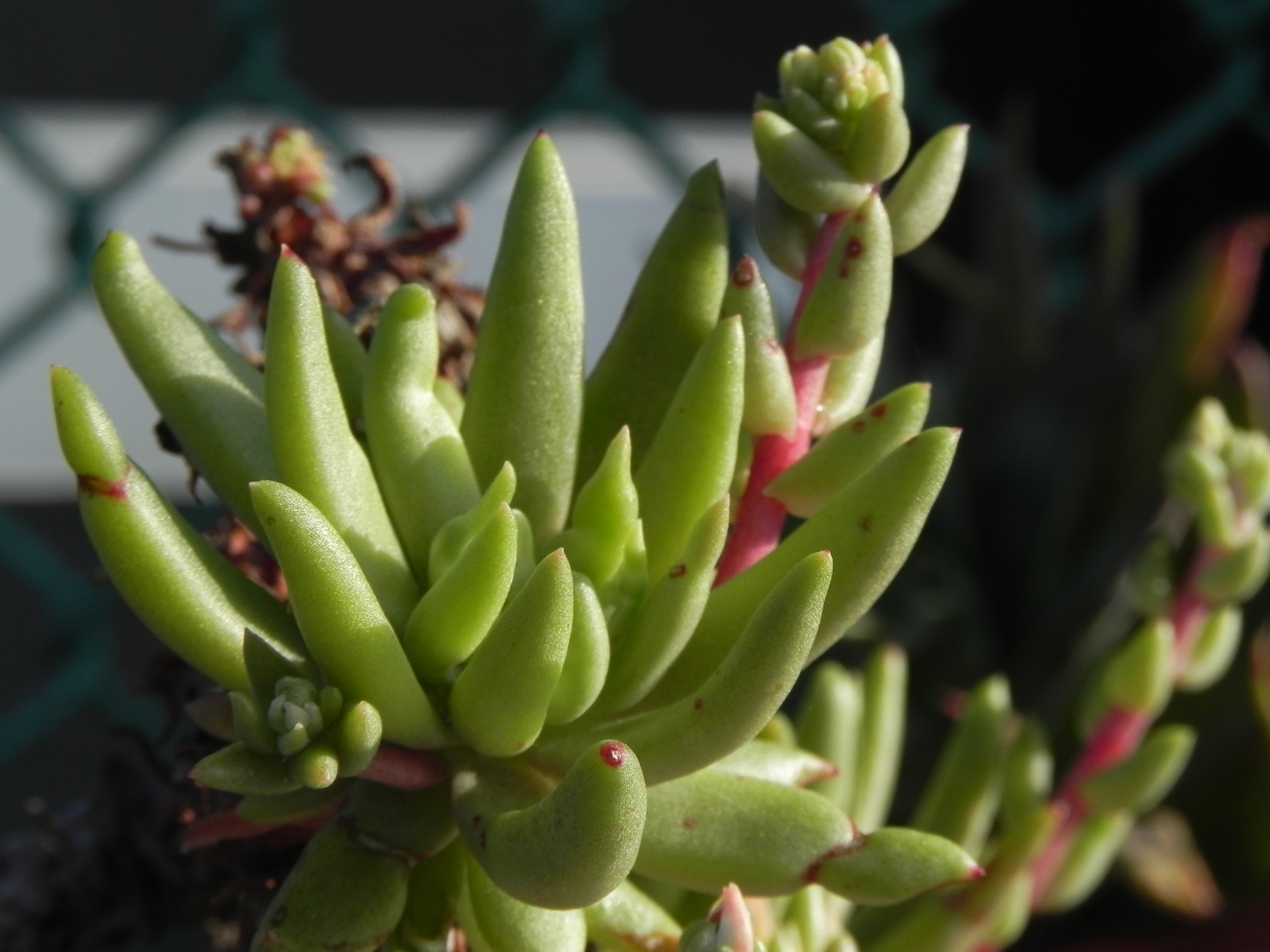
- A cultivated plant with nascent inflorescences visible.

Scientific classification
- Kingdom: Plantae
- Clade: Tracheophytes
- Clade: Angiosperms
- Clade: Eudicots
- Order: Saxifragales
- Family: Crassulaceae
- Genus: Dudleya
- Species: D. anomala

Binomial name
- Dudleya anomala (Davidson) Moran
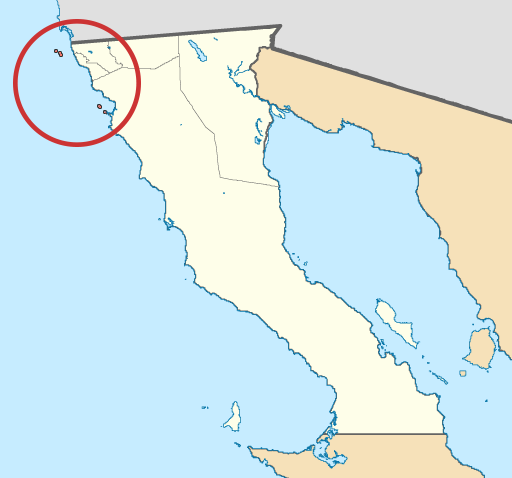
- Distribution of D. anomala.

Synonyms
- Stylophyllum coronatum (Fröd.); Stylophyllum anomalum (Davidson)

= Dudleya anomala =

Todos Santos liveforever

Species of plant

Dudleya anomala is a rare species of succulent plant in the family Crassulaceae commonly known as the Todos Santos liveforever. With a dense, cushion-forming habit, this leaf succulent is characterized by elongated stems, slightly sticky leaves, and bell-shaped flowers with white, spreading petals. This species is native to Baja California, Mexico, and is found primarily on islands and one coastal locality.

== Description ==
=== Morphology ===
Dudleya anomala is a rosette-forming leaf succulent that grows in a caespitose habit, with the stems branching to form dense cushions of rosettes 3–4 dm (12–16 in) in diameter. The stems are elongated and procumbent, and may reach up to 3 dm (12 in) long, and are usually 5–10 mm (0.20–0.39 in) thick. Topping the stems are the rosettes, which contain 20 to 30 close-set leaves, that may become somewhat separated when the stem is rapidly elongating. The leaves are shaped strap-oblanceolate to strap-shaped, with acute tips. The lower surface of the leaf is convex, while the upper surface is only slightly convex. The leaf margins are obtuse or rounded, but not toward the base. The leaves measure 2–5 cm (0.79–1.97 in) long by 4–6 mm (0.16–0.24 in) wide, with the leaf bases 4–7 mm (0.16–0.28 in) broad. The leaves are slightly viscid.

The peduncle is 5–15 cm (2.0–5.9 in) by 1–3 mm (0.039–0.118 in) thick, and is covered in ascending bracts. The bracts are shaped narrowly deltoid-ovate to deltoid-lanceolate, with sharply acute tips. The lower bracts measure 1–2 cm (0.39–0.79 in) long by 3–5 mm (0.12–0.20 in) wide. The inflorescence is compact, with an overall rounded shape, and measures about 3–4 cm (1.2–1.6 in) in diameter. The inflorescence usually has three major branches which may or may not subsequently rebranch once, and the terminal branches contain 3 to 5 flowers, held on pedicels 2–5 mm (0.079–0.197 in) long.

On the flower, the sepals are deltoid to deltoid-ovate with acute tips, measuring 2–2.5 mm (0.079–0.098 in) long. The petals are somewhat spreading from the base, with the tips curving outward. Petals are narrowly ovate with acute tips, measuring 8–10 mm (0.31–0.39 in) long by 3.5–4 mm (0.14–0.16 in) wide, connate for 0.5 mm (0.020 in) or less. The petals are white, but somewhat flecked on the keel with red. The stamens measure about 5–6 mm (0.20–0.24 in) long, and are adnate with the petals for 0.5–1.5 mm (0.020–0.059 in). The anthers are orange, and 1.5 mm (0.059 in). The carpels are 6–7 mm (0.24–0.28 in) and connate for about 1 mm (0.039 in), spreading in age, with the styles 2 mm (0.079 in) long.

=== Characteristics ===
D. anomala possesses slightly viscid (sticky) and odorous foliage, a trait only shared by the aptly-named Dudleya viscida. In comparison, anomala has smaller leaves, thinner caudices, and smaller, simpler inflorescences.

== Taxonomy ==
=== Taxonomic history ===
Anstruther Davidson first described the species as Stylophyllum anomalum in 1928, based on a specimen collected by Robert Kessler from North Coronado Island and deposited in the herbarium of the Los Angeles County Museum by Davidson. Harald Fröderström described Stylophyllum insulare based on a specimen collected by Marcus E. Jones from the Coronado Islands in 1926. This name later became a homonym, so it was changed to Stylophyllum coronatum. Philip A. Munz also observed this species on the Coronado Islands, referring to it as Echeveria virens.

Reid Moran wrote a more complete description of the species in 1943, and recognized it as a Dudleya, creating the current combination.

=== Phylogenetics ===
A 2013 phylogenetic analysis of D. anomala places it in a clade with Dudleya anthonyi.

== Distribution and habitat ==
Dudleya anomala is only found in the state of Baja California, Mexico and has an insular distribution on the Islas Coronados, Isla Todos Santos, and one location on the mainland, the extreme point of the Punta Banda. The range of D. anomala overlaps with those of Dudleya lanceolata, Dudleya candida, and Dudleya attenuata.

Specimens of D. anomala observed by Reid Moran occurred on steep, north-facing cliffs on the Coronado Islands. On the Isla Todos Santos, the plant is found densely covering rocks and cliffs on northern and eastern exposures. On the Punta Banda, this species is found on steep, north-facing beach cliffs overlooking the Todos Santos Bay. Populations of Dudleya anomala are consistently associated with Niebla ceruchoides.

== Gallery ==
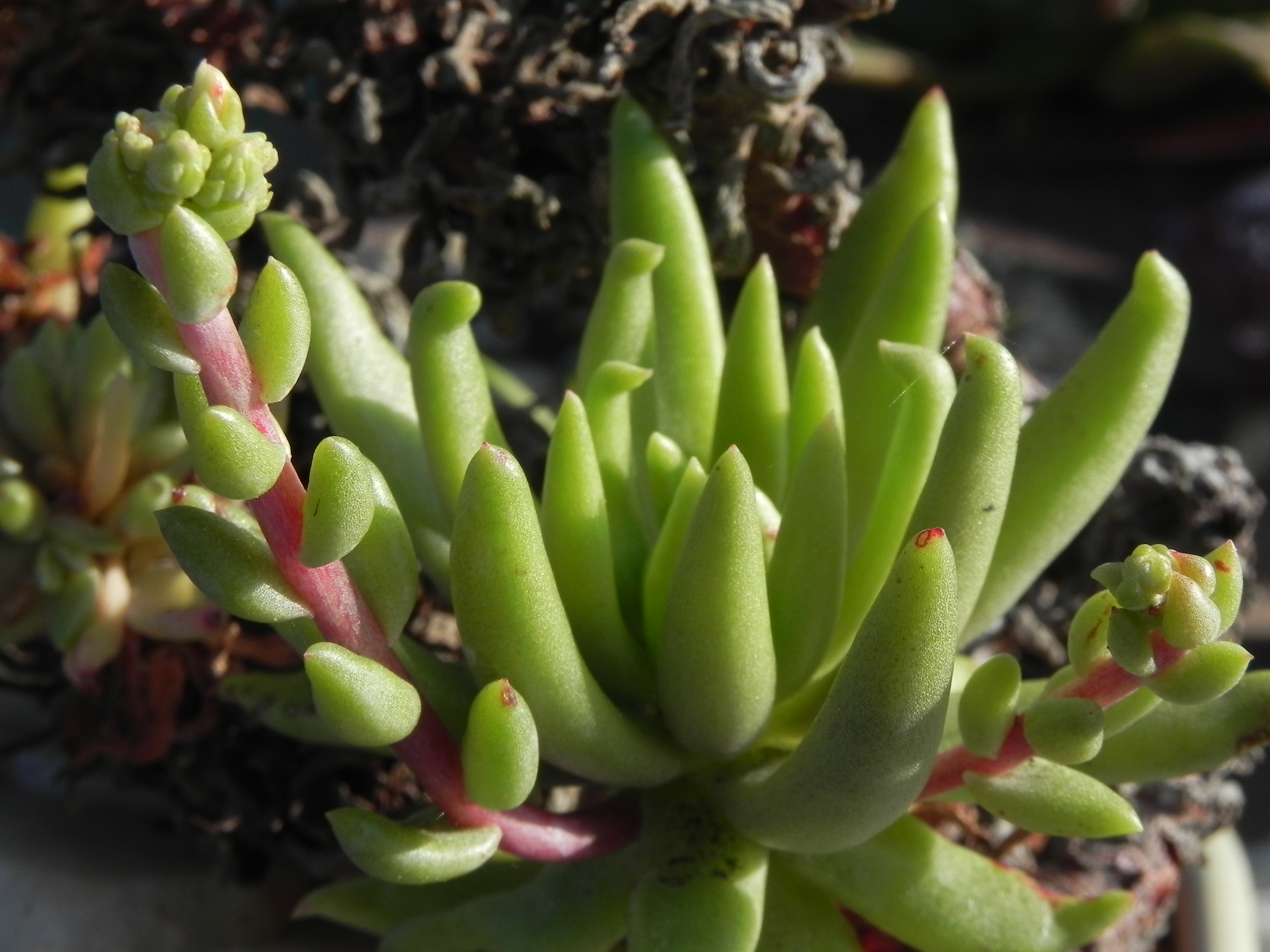
Cultivated plant with nascent inflorescences.

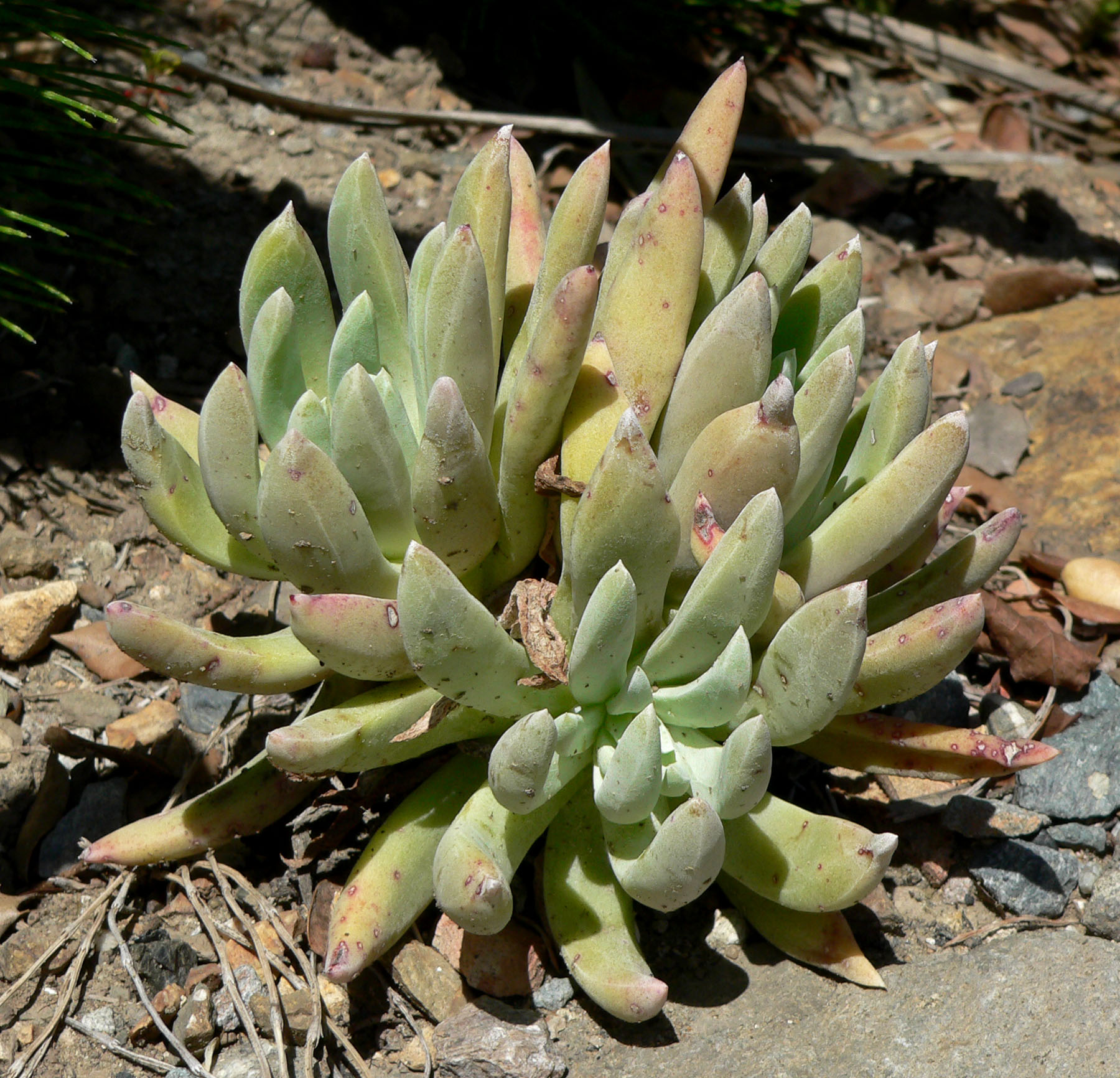
At the University of California Botanical Garden, Berkeley, California

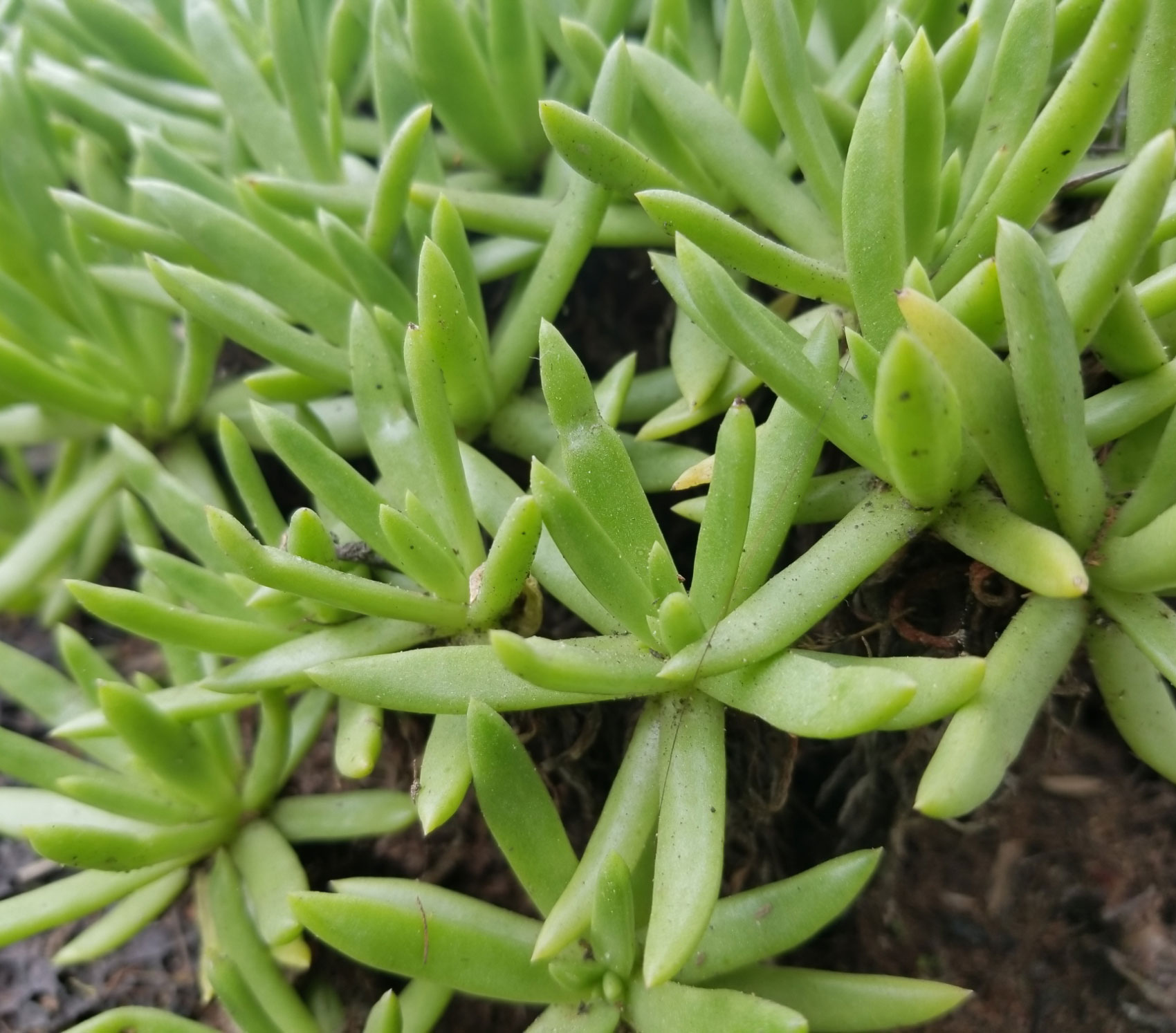
At the Huntington Library.

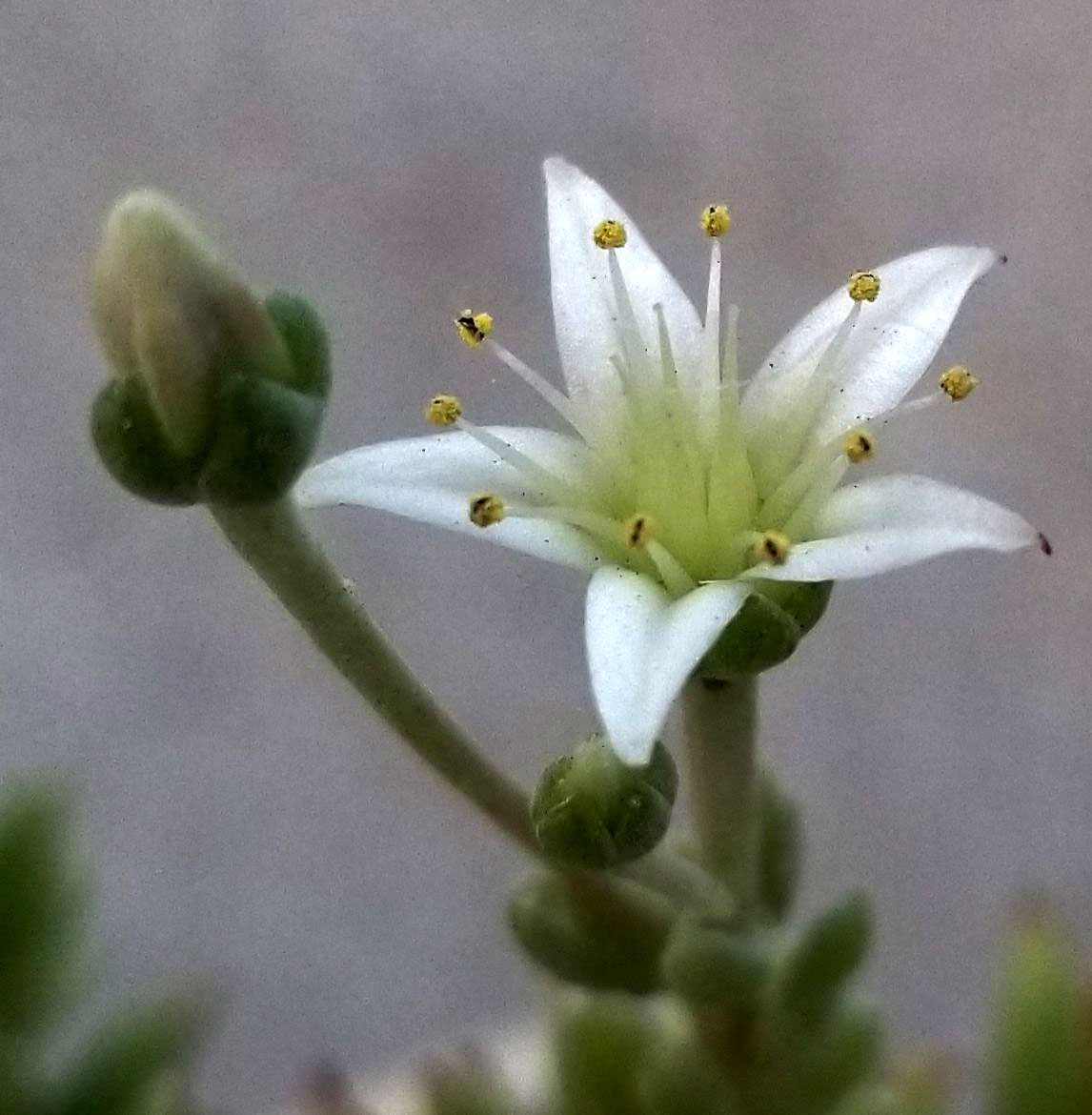
Detail of a flower and bud.

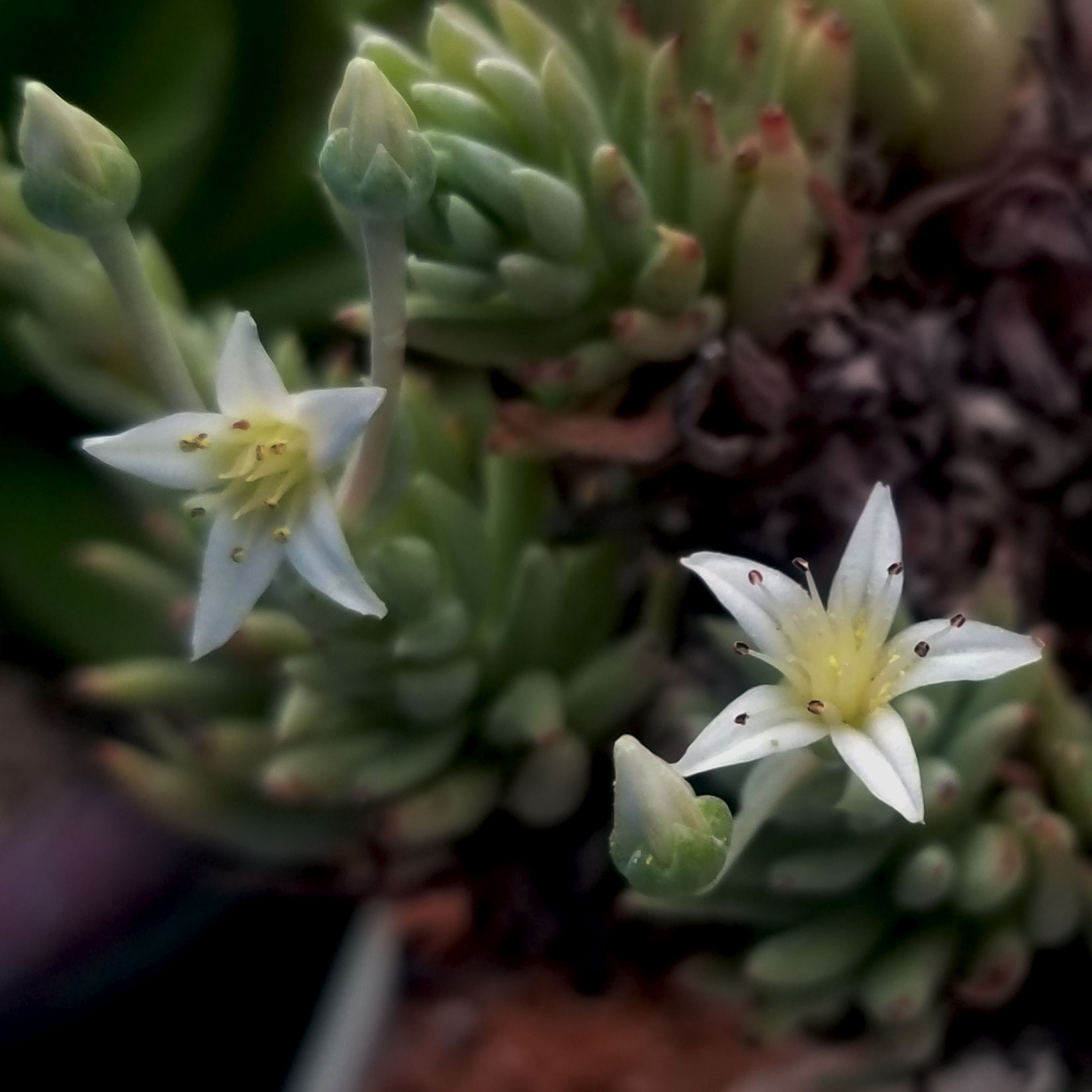
Multiple flowers and buds.
