= Bunker's woodrat =

Conservation status
- Extinct (1931) (IUCN 3.1)

Scientific classification
- Kingdom: Animalia
- Phylum: Chordata
- Class: Mammalia
- Order: Rodentia
- Family: Cricetidae
- Subfamily: Neotominae
- Genus: Neotoma
- Species: N. bryanti
- Subspecies: †N. b. bunkeri

Trinomial name
- †Neotoma bryanti bunkeri Burt, 1932

Extinct species of rodent

Bunker's woodrat (Neotoma bryanti bunkeri) is an extinct subspecies of Bryant's woodrat in the family Cricetidae. Only five specimens are known; these were collected in 1932 by W.H. Burt and are housed at a museum at UCLA. Neotoma bunkeri was only described from Coronados Islands, Baja California, Mexico. It probably died out as a result of depletion of food resources and predation by feral cats.
