= Bahía de Todos Santos =

Bay in Baja California, Mexico

Bahía de Todos Santos All Saints' Bay
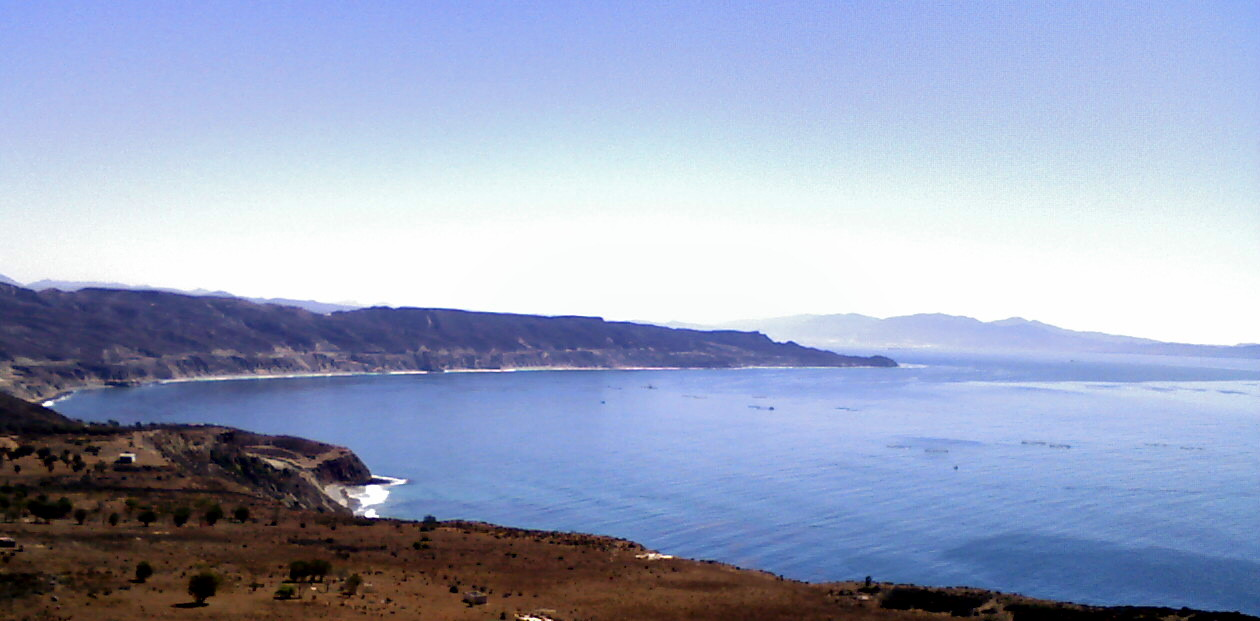
- Ensenada Bay

- Location within Mexico
- Location: Ensenada, Baja California, Mexico
- Coordinates: 31°48′N 116°42′W
- Ocean/sea sources: Pacific Ocean
- Basin countries: Mexico
- Settlements: Ensenada

Bahía Todos Santos, or Bay of All Saints, is a sheltered bay in Ensenada, Baja California, Mexico. The bay is home to the deepwater busy international Port of Ensenada.

== Geography ==
The bay is bound to the north and east by the Pacific coast of the Baja California Peninsula, and to the south by Cape Punta Banda.

=== Flora and fauna ===
The bay serves as a temporary resting stop for the migrating gray whale, who occasionally give birth offshore, though it is much more common for birthing to occur in the lagoons of the west coast of Baja California.

== Recreation ==
The bay is home to several marinas within Ensenada including Ensenada Cruiseport Village, Marina Coral & Hotel, Punta Morro Resort, and Bajamar Oceanfront Golf Resort.

== See also ==
- Isla Todos Santos
