= San Martín Island woodrat =

Conservation status
- Extinct (1950s) (IUCN 3.1)

Scientific classification
- Kingdom: Animalia
- Phylum: Chordata
- Class: Mammalia
- Order: Rodentia
- Family: Cricetidae
- Subfamily: Neotominae
- Genus: Neotoma
- Species: N. bryanti
- Subspecies: †N. b. martinensis

Trinomial name
- †Neotoma bryanti martinensis Goldman, 1905

Extinct species of rodent

The San Martín Island woodrat (Neotoma bryanti martinensis) is an extinct subspecies of Bryant's woodrat in the family Cricetidae.

== Description ==
It was endemic to San Martín Island, located off the Pacific coast of the central Baja California Peninsula, part of southwestern Baja California state in northwestern Mexico.

The primary threat to the San Martín Island woodrat was predation by feral cats on the island.
