= Anthony's woodrat =

Conservation status
- Extinct (1926) (IUCN 3.1)

Scientific classification
- Kingdom: Animalia
- Phylum: Chordata
- Class: Mammalia
- Order: Rodentia
- Family: Cricetidae
- Subfamily: Neotominae
- Genus: Neotoma
- Species: N. bryanti
- Subspecies: †N. b. anthonyi

Trinomial name
- †Neotoma bryanti anthonyi J.A Allen, 1898

Extinct species of rodent

Anthony's woodrat (Neotoma bryanti anthonyi) is an extinct subspecies of Bryant's woodrat in the family Cricetidae. It was found only on Isla Todos Santos in Baja California, Mexico. It is thought to have been driven to extinction through predation from feral cats.

Woodrats were commonly known to have lived near the land bridge islands where there were also 3 other commonly found species of the Neotoma genus that are particular to the Baja California area. The N. Anthonyi is also known for living in areas that were commonly close to flatland areas that would provide for their herbivore diet as well. It's also only one of two species on the bridge islands that are able to stick to a completely herbivore diet considering its vegetation.
