= Port of Ensenada =

Port in Baja California, Mexico

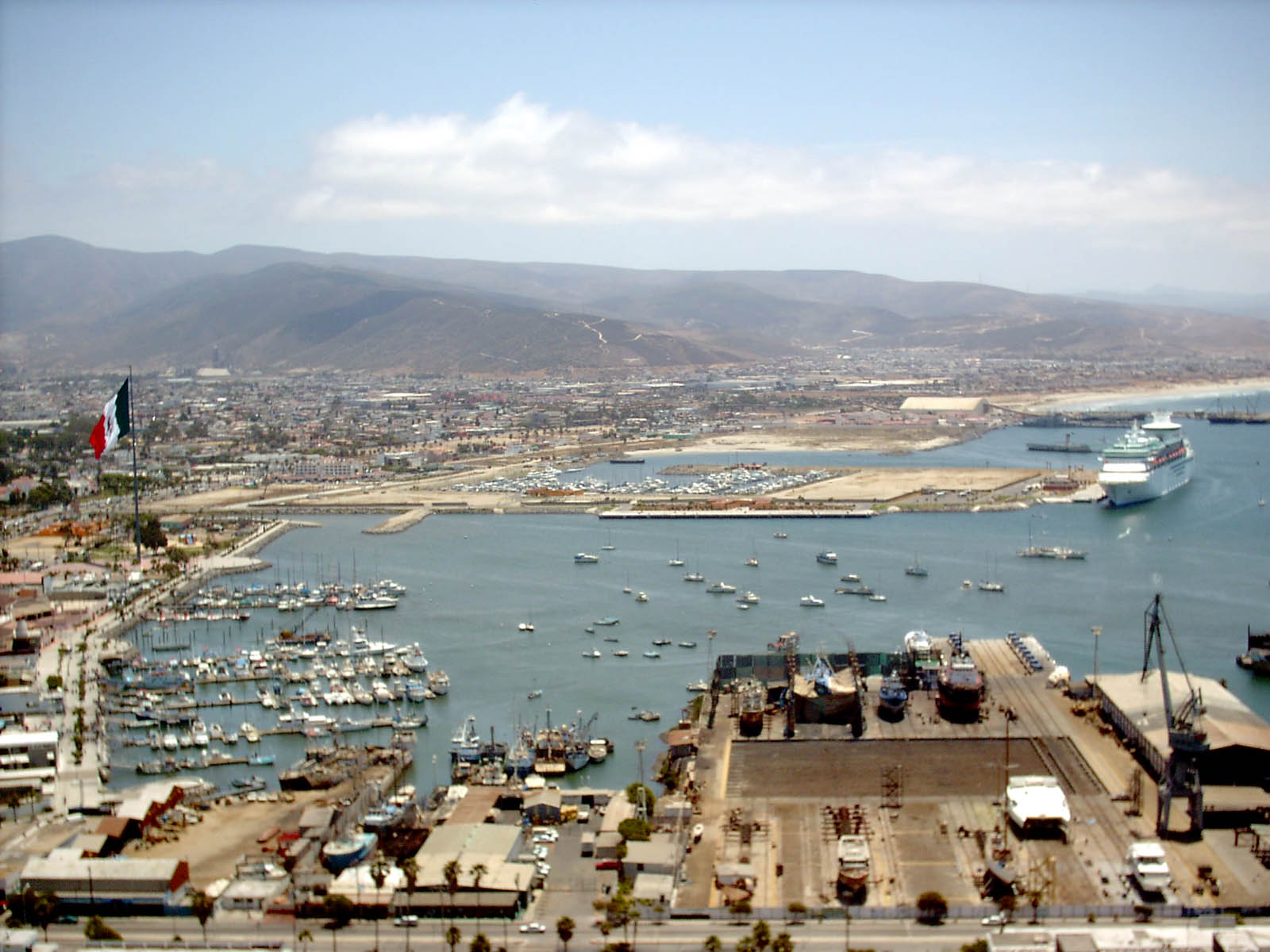
- Cruise Terminal and Marina
- Interactive map of Port of Ensenada

Location
- Country: Mexico
- Location: Ensenada, Baja California
- Coordinates: 31°51′3″N 116°37′35″W
- UN/LOCODE: MXESE

Details
- Operated by: Port Authority of Ensenada
- Type of harbour: Natural Seaport
- Size of harbour: 82,367 square miles (213,330 km^{2})
- Land area: 9,000 square miles (23,000 km^{2})
- Size: Medium
- No. of berths: 13
- No. of piers: 6
- Main exports: Cotton, Limestone, Crushed rock, Bagged stones, Sand.
- Harbor type: Coastal Breakwater Harbor with Good Shelter

Statistics
- Vessel arrivals: 934
- Annual cargo tonnage: 3,681,761
- Annual container volume: 143,660 twenty-foot equivalent units (TEU) (FY 2010)
- Passenger traffic: 361,285
- Website www.puertoensenada.com.mx/English/

The Port of Ensenada is a marine freight and cruise terminal in Ensenada, Baja California. This deepwater port lies in Bahia de Todos Santos.

Ships arrive from major ports in Asia, North America, and South America. The port accommodates cruise ships, bulk cargo, and container ships. The Port of Ensenada maintains specialized shipyards. It also supports commercial and sport fishing, pleasure craft, and marina areas.

In 2010, the Port of Ensenada handled 3,593,000 t (3,540,000 long tons; 3,960,000 short tons) of cargo and 156 cruise ship calls—the latter figure down from a peak of 293 three years earlier. In 2011, it was Mexico's second-busiest port and the second-most-visited port-of-call for major cruise lines and pleasure boats.

== Maritime ==
The port authority administers two cargo terminals, which manage maritime connections with 64 ports in 28 countries. Exports are sent directly to ports in Hong Kong, Korea, Japan, Malaysia, Taiwan, Indonesia, Costa Rica, Honduras, Chile, France, Italy, Spain, Morocco and Algeria. As of 2011, imports predominantly came from Nicaragua, New Zealand, and Asian countries.

== Cruise ==
The port's main cruise ship facility is in the center of the port at the Cruise Terminal and Marina designated area. The port authority devised plans in 2009 to dredge parts of the port to serve post-Panamax vessels and reduce congestion at the Port of Long Beach.

== Bulk cargo port ==
The bulk cargo port handles bulk commodities not transported in container ships.

== Marina ==
The port maintains one marina and in 2011, was looking to expand a second marina then further develop both marinas. The port also maintains a sport fishing terminal.

== Gallery ==
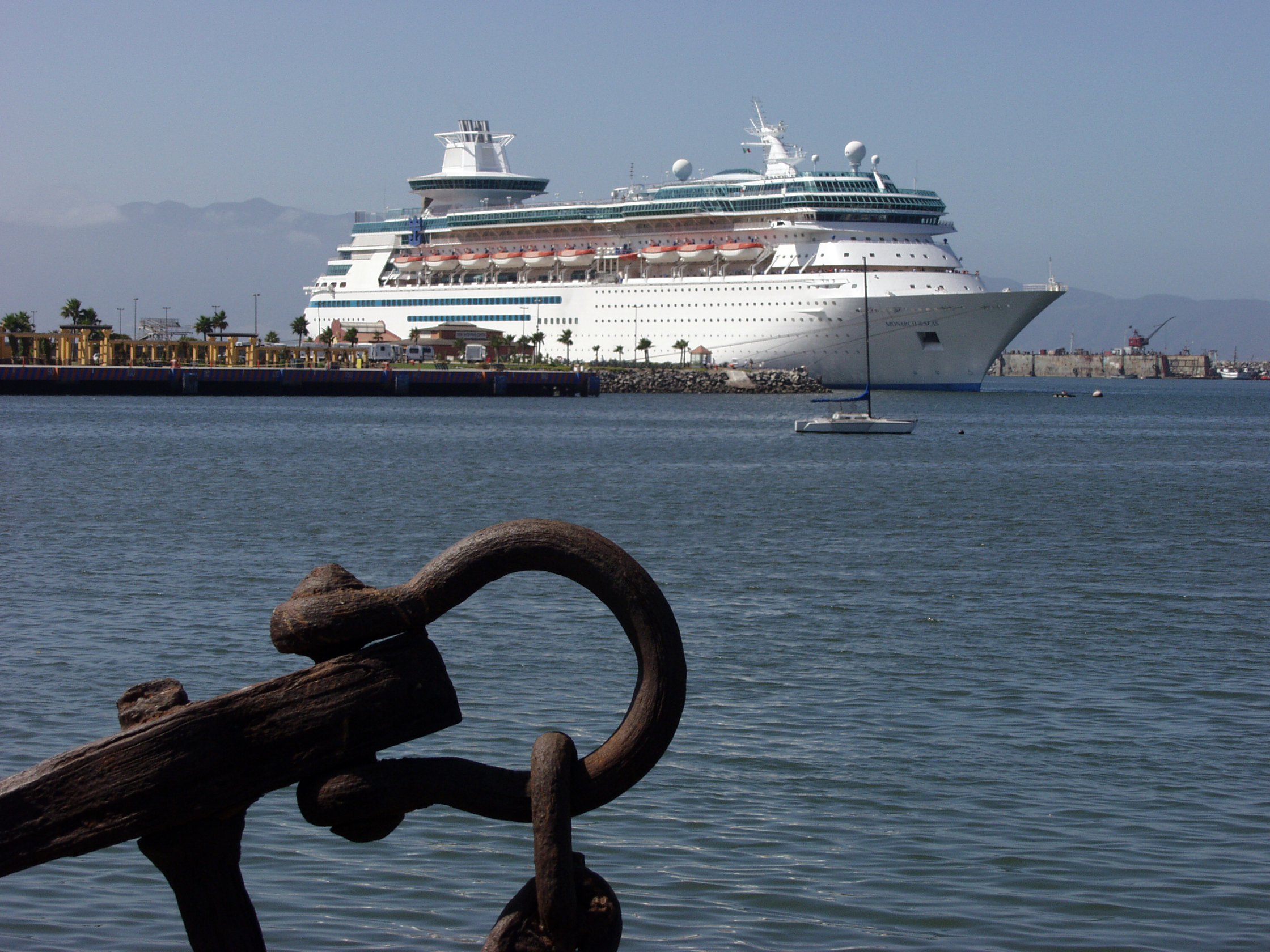
Monarch of the Seas docked at port

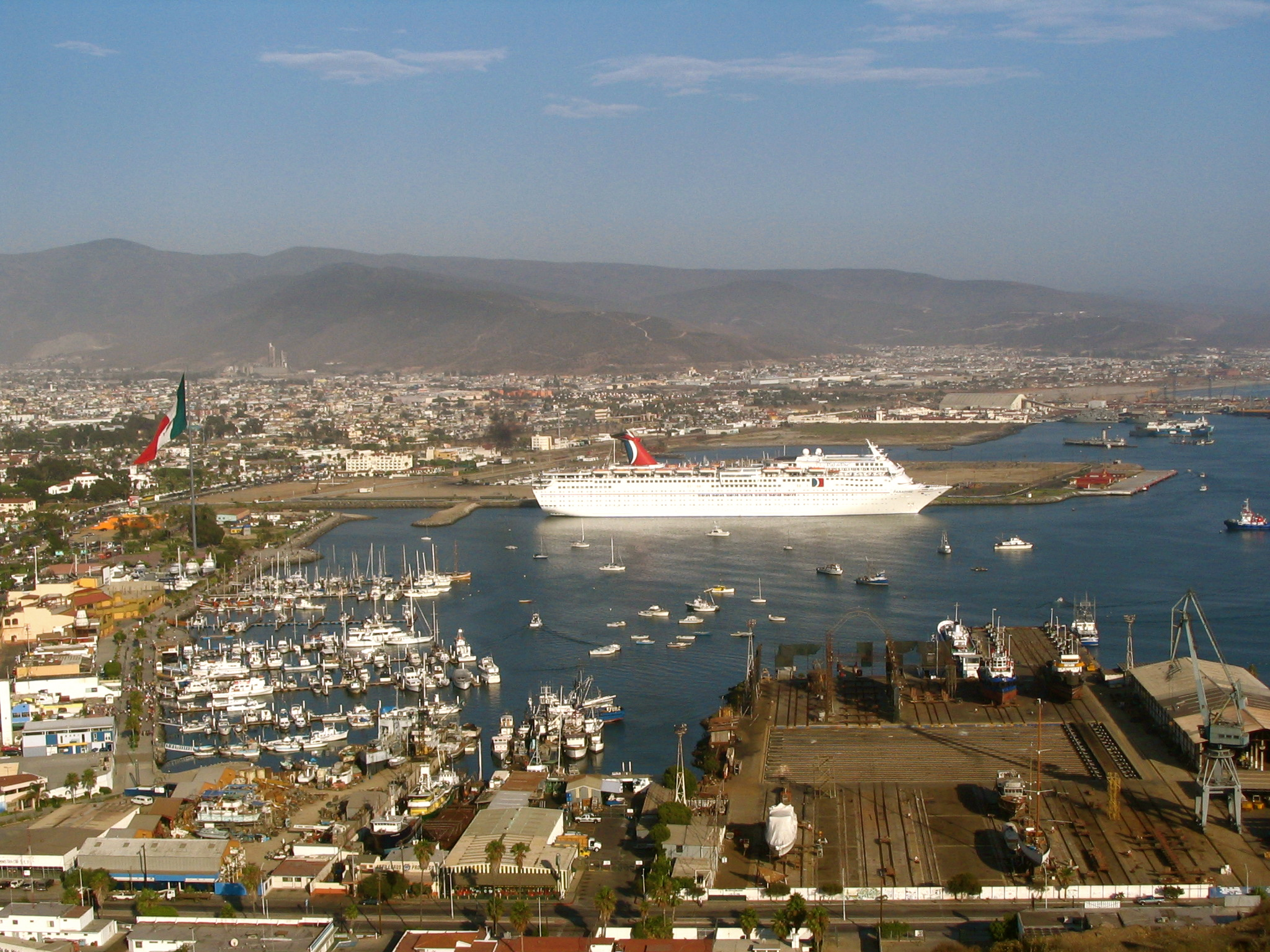
Carnival Cruise ship docked, Sport fishing terminal, and shipyards
