= Punta Banda =

Cape in Baja California, Mexico

- Cape
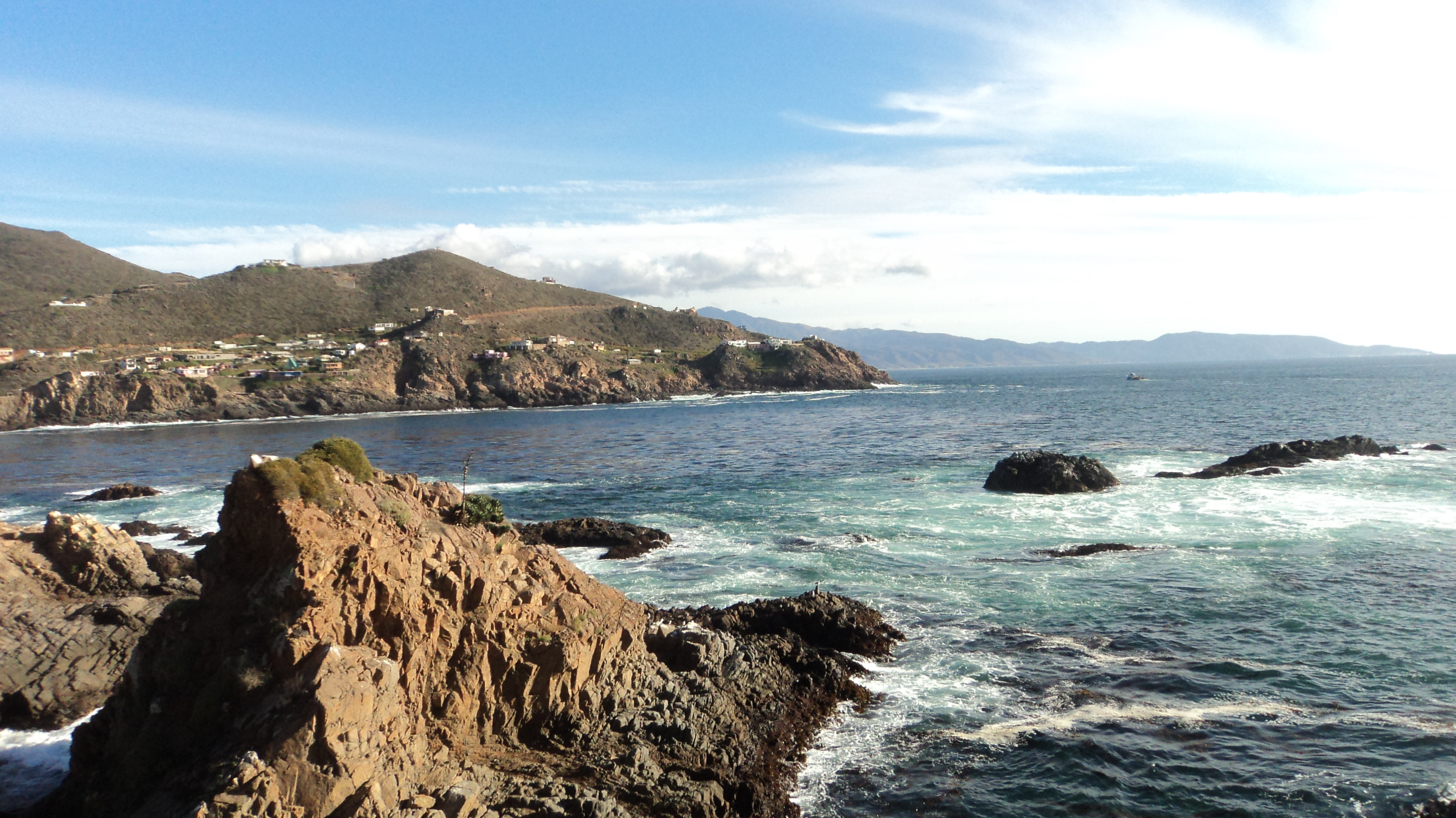
- Looking southeast along the coast of Cape Punta Banda

- Coordinates: 31°43′23″N 116°41′42″W
- Location: Ensenada Municipality, Baja California, Mexico
- Range: Peninsular Ranges

Area
  - Total: 29 km^{2} (11 mi^{2})

Dimensions
  - Length: 12 km (7.5 mi)

Punta Banda is a prominent cape located southwest of the city of Ensenada in Ensenada Municipality, Baja California, Mexico.

== Geography ==
Punta Banda forms the southern boundary of the Bahía de Todos Santos, sheltering the Port of Ensenada from the Southern California Countercurrent. The twin islands of Isla Todos Santos lie about 6 km (3.7 mi) off the northwestern tip of the peninsula, further sheltering the bay.

== Ecology ==
The peninsula lies on the boundary between the California coastal sage and chaparral ecoregion to the northeast, and the Baja California desert to the southwest.

== Tourism ==
The peninsula is a popular tourist destination for those visiting La Bufadora, the second largest blowhole in the world and the only one in the American continent.

== See also ==
- Punta Colonet, Baja California
