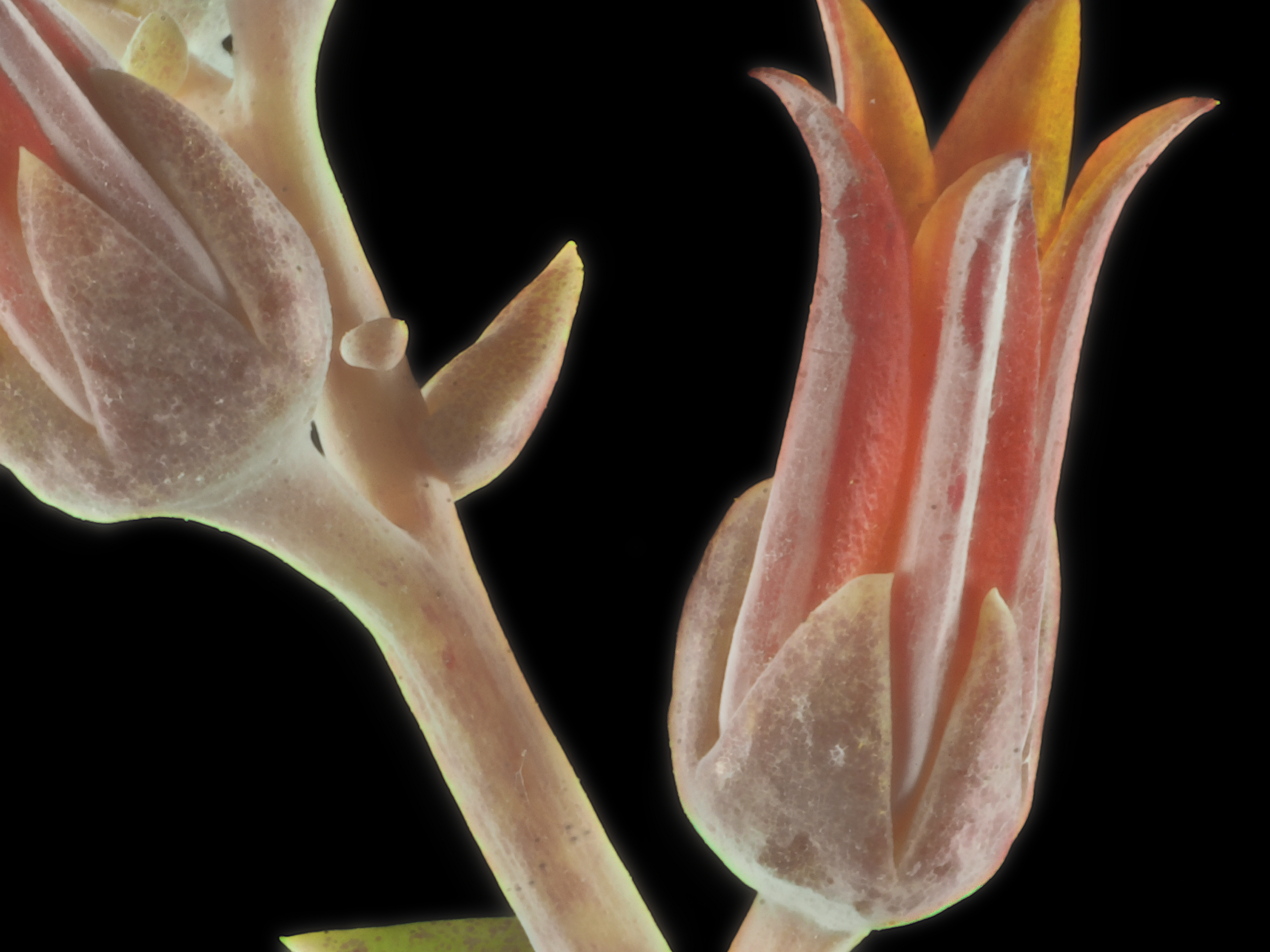

Conservation status
- Vulnerable (NatureServe)

Scientific classification
- Kingdom: Plantae
- Clade: Tracheophytes
- Clade: Angiosperms
- Clade: Eudicots
- Order: Saxifragales
- Family: Crassulaceae
- Genus: Dudleya
- Species: D. lanceolata

Binomial name
- Dudleya lanceolata (Nutt.) Britt. & Rose

Synonyms
- Synonymy: Cotyledon lanceolata (Nutt.) Benth. & Hook. f. ex S. Watson; Dudleya bernardina Britton & Rose; Dudleya brauntonii Rose; Dudleya congesta Britton; Dudleya cymosa subsp. minor (Rose) Moran; Dudleya elongata Rose; Dudleya goldmanii Rose; Dudleya hallii Rose; Dudleya lurida Rose; Dudleya minor Rose; Dudleya nevadensis subsp. minor (Rose) Abrams; Dudleya parishii Rose; Dudleya reflexa Britton; Dudleya robusta Britton; Echeveria congesta (Britton) A.Berger; Echeveria elongata (Rose) A.Berger; Echeveria hallii (Rose) A.Nelson & J.F.Macbr.; Echeveria lanceolata Nutt.; Echeveria lanceolata var. composta Jeps.; Echeveria lanceolata var. incerta Jeps.; Echeveria lanceolata var. lurida (Rose) Munz; Echeveria laxa var. minor (Rose) Jeps.; Echeveria minor (Rose) A.Berger; Echeveria monicae A.Berger; Echeveria parishii (Rose) A.Berger; Echeveria reflexa (Britton) A.Berger; Echeveria robusta (Britton) A.Berger

= Dudleya lanceolata =

Lanceleaf liveforever

Species of succulent

Dudleya lanceolata is a succulent plant known by the common name lanceleaf liveforever or lance-leaved dudleya. It is an extremely variable and widely ranging species that occurs from Monterey County and Kern County in California south through Ensenada in Baja California. It is characterized by green to purple lanceolate leaves, red, orange, or less commonly yellow petals, and is typically tetraploid. Despite its diversity, it is quite stable as a species, but hybrids may be discovered with other species of Dudleya, which can make it difficult to discern in areas where numerous species converge.

== Description ==
=== Vegetative morphology ===
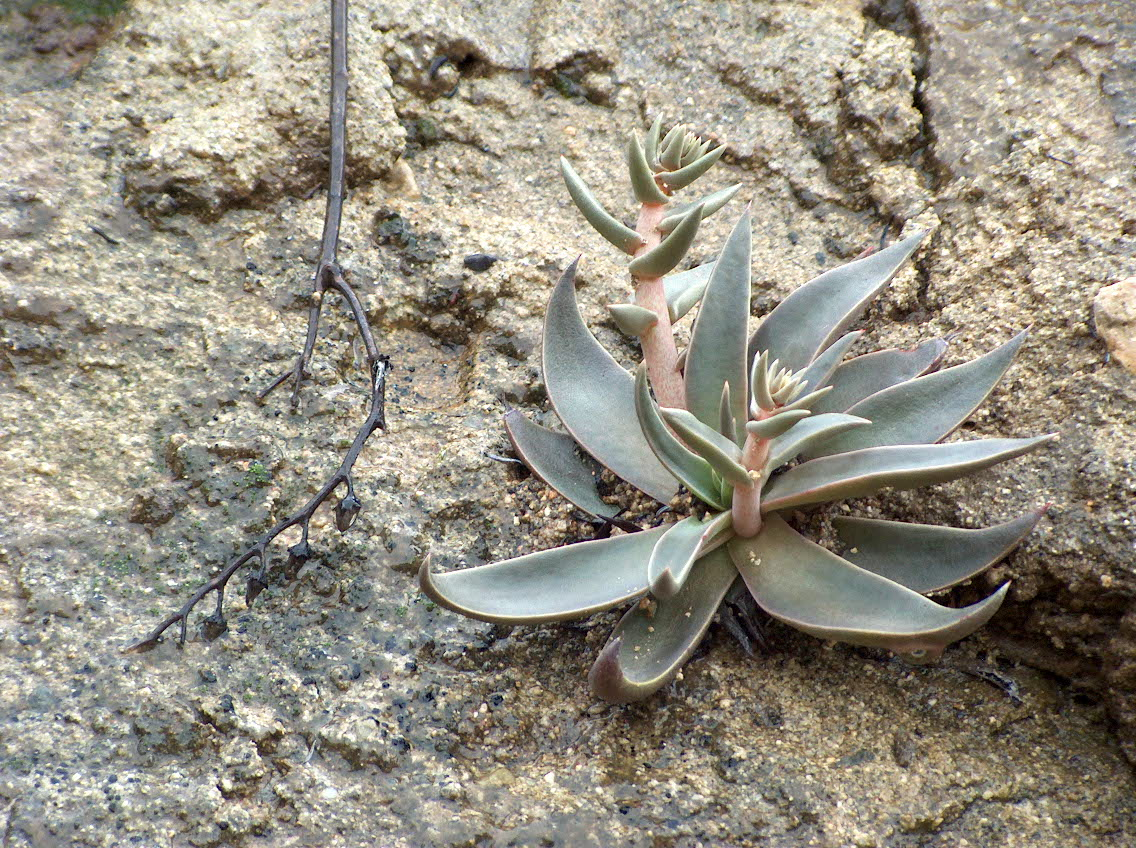
A gray-leaved plant growing in rock, in the Santa Monica Mountains National Recreation Area.

This plant is a rosette-forming succulent. The rosettes emerge from the apex of the caudex, which may be solitary or apically branched, with anywhere from 1 to 7 rosettes on top. The caudex is 1 to 3 cm wide, less than 4 cm long, but is occasionally elongated. The rosettes are 3 to 25 cm in diameter, and typically with 10 to 25 leaves. The leaves are green and sometimes glaucous, but not farinose, shaped oblong to lanceolate, 4 to 30 cm long by 0.5 to 4 cm wide, and 1.5 to 6 mm thick. The tip of the leaf is acute.

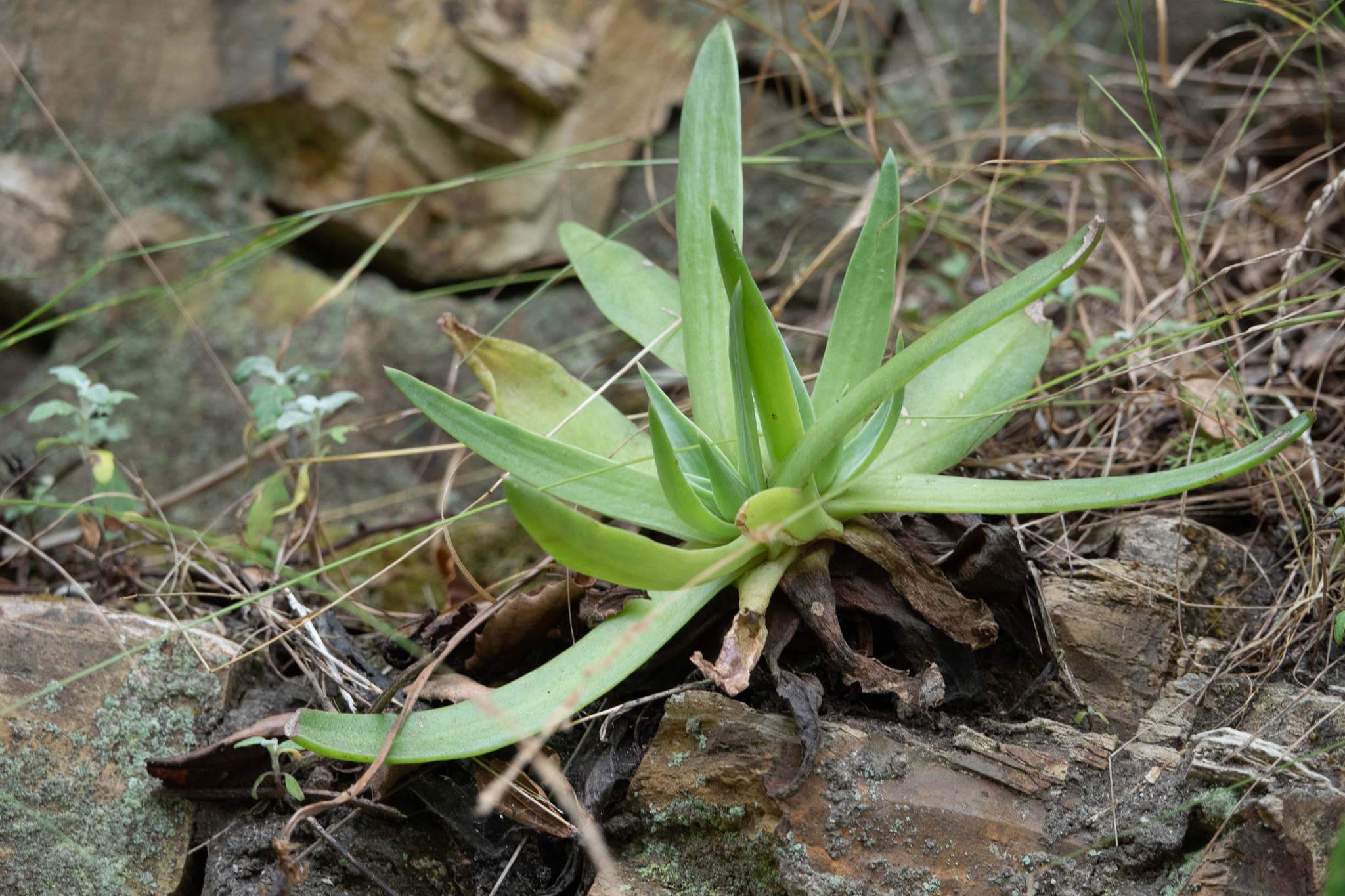
A green-leaved plant

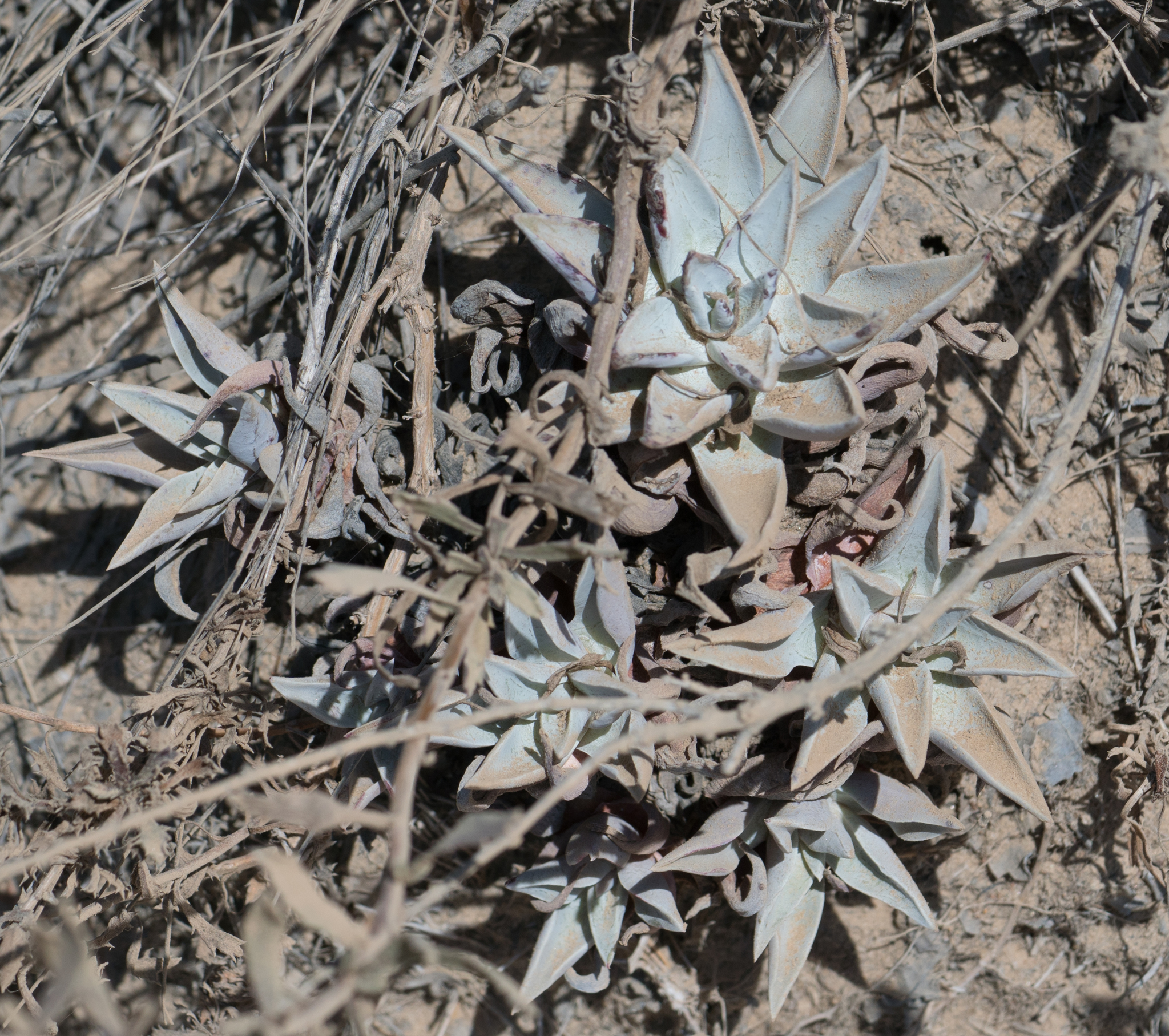
A sand-covered, white-leaved plant at Torrey Pines State Reserve

=== Reproductive morphology ===
The peduncle is 15 to 95 cm tall, and is 3 to 12 mm wide. The lower internodes are spaced over 5 mm from each other. There are 18 to 40 bracts, spreading to ascending, and shaped triangular-lanceolate to ovate. The cyme is branched 2 to 3 times, and the next branches may bifurcate. The terminal branches are 2 to 25 cm long, and have 2 to 20 flowers on spreading pedicels. The pedicels are 2 to 12 mm long, becoming erect, and are red or green, and not generally pink. The sepals are 3 to 6 mm large, shaped deltate-ovate. The petals are 10 to 16 mm long, 3.5 to 5 mm wide, shaped elliptic to oblanceolate and fused connately 1 to 2 mm. The petals are usually red or orange, and more uncommonly bright yellow to purplish-red, and very rarely green.

Flower variety of Dudleya lanceolata

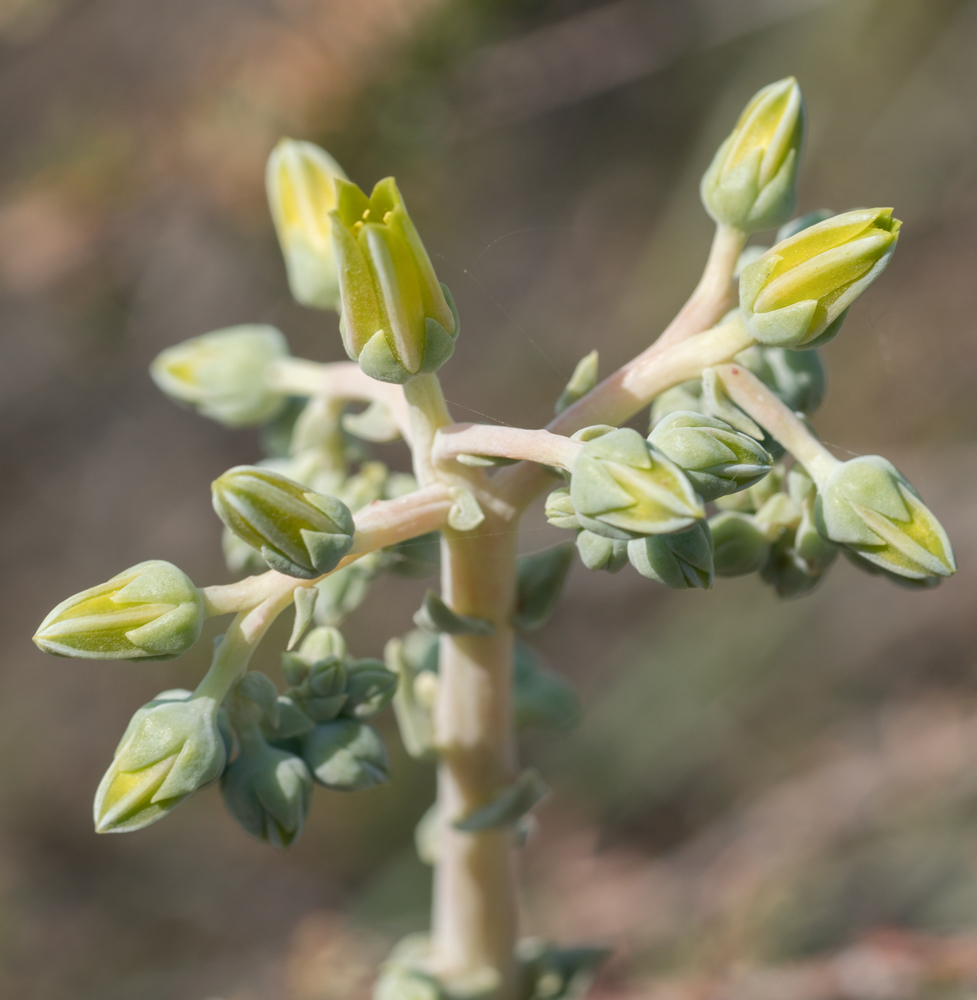
Yellow flowers with green sepals

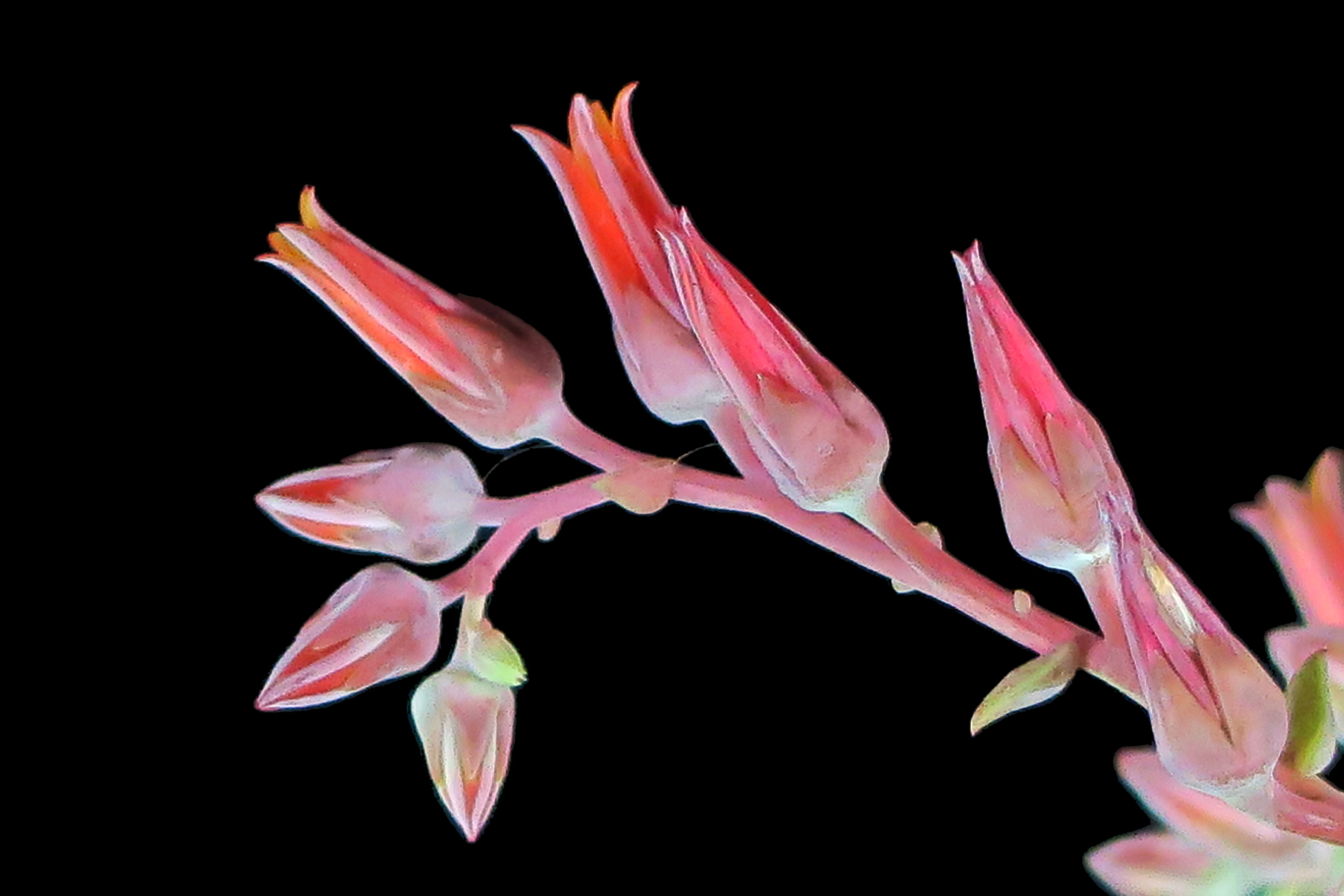
Red flowers with pink sepals

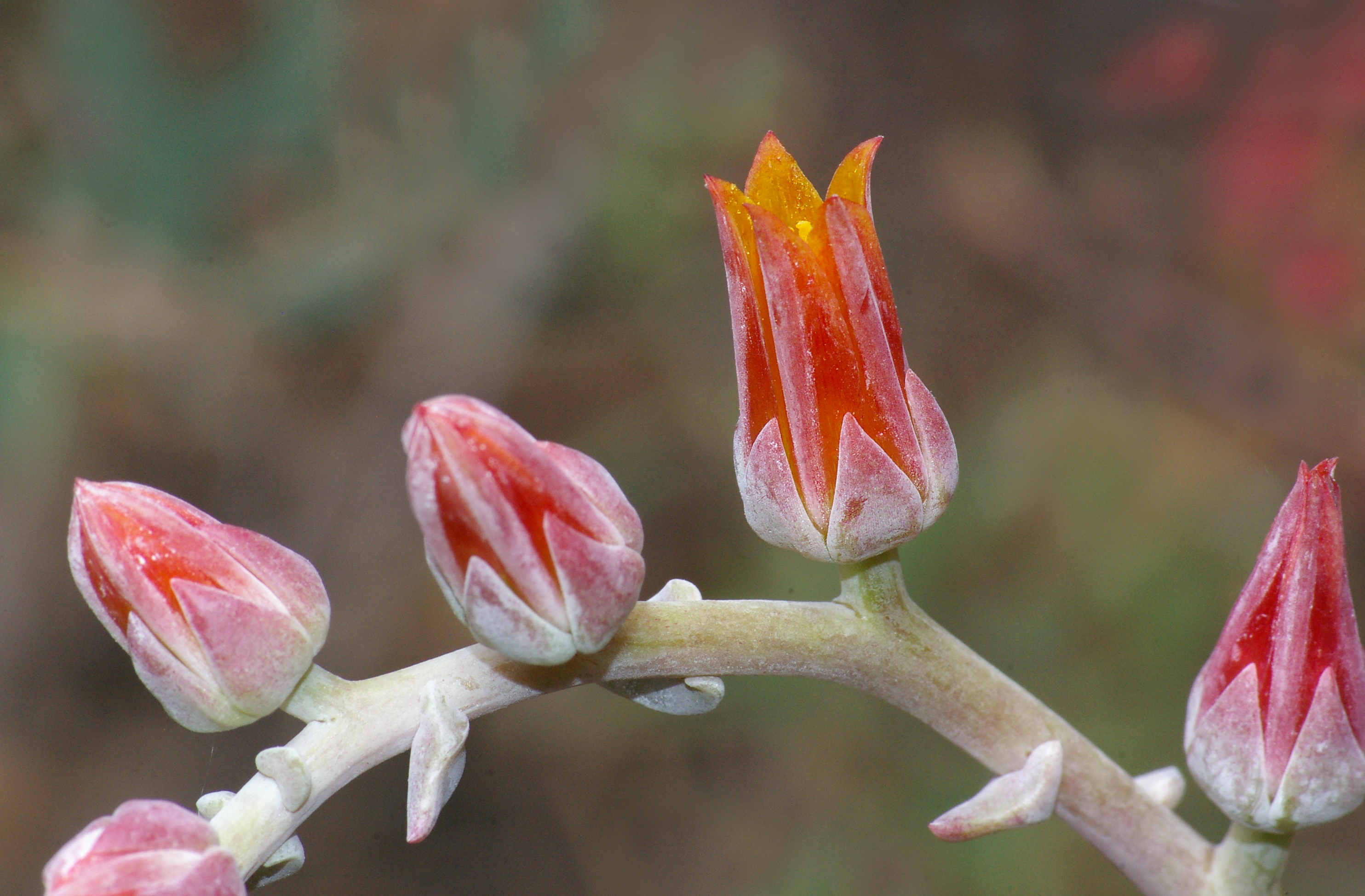
Orange-red flowers with gray and glaucous sepals

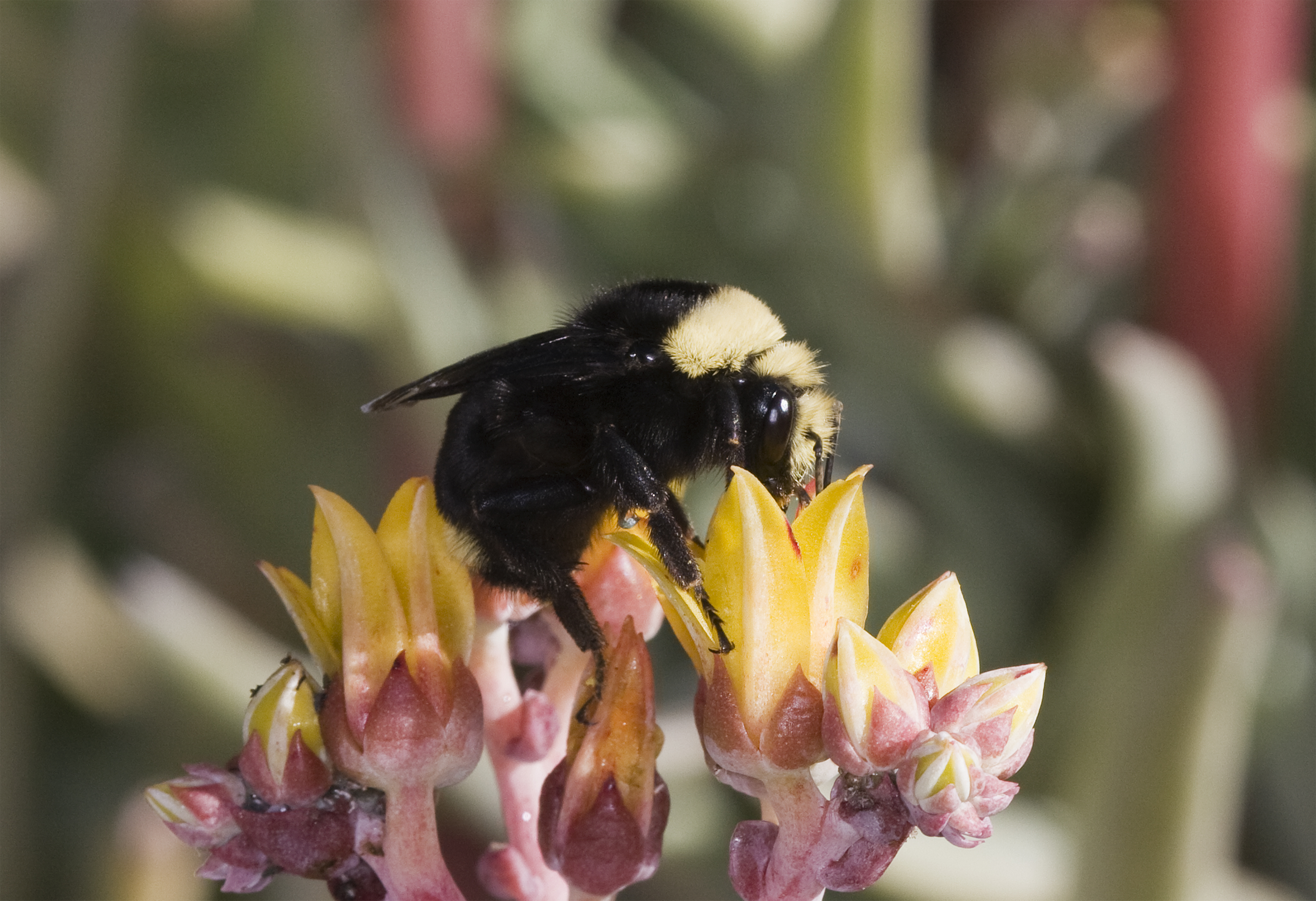
Orange-yellow flowers with a Yellow-Faced Bumble Bee (Bombus vosnesenskii) pollinator

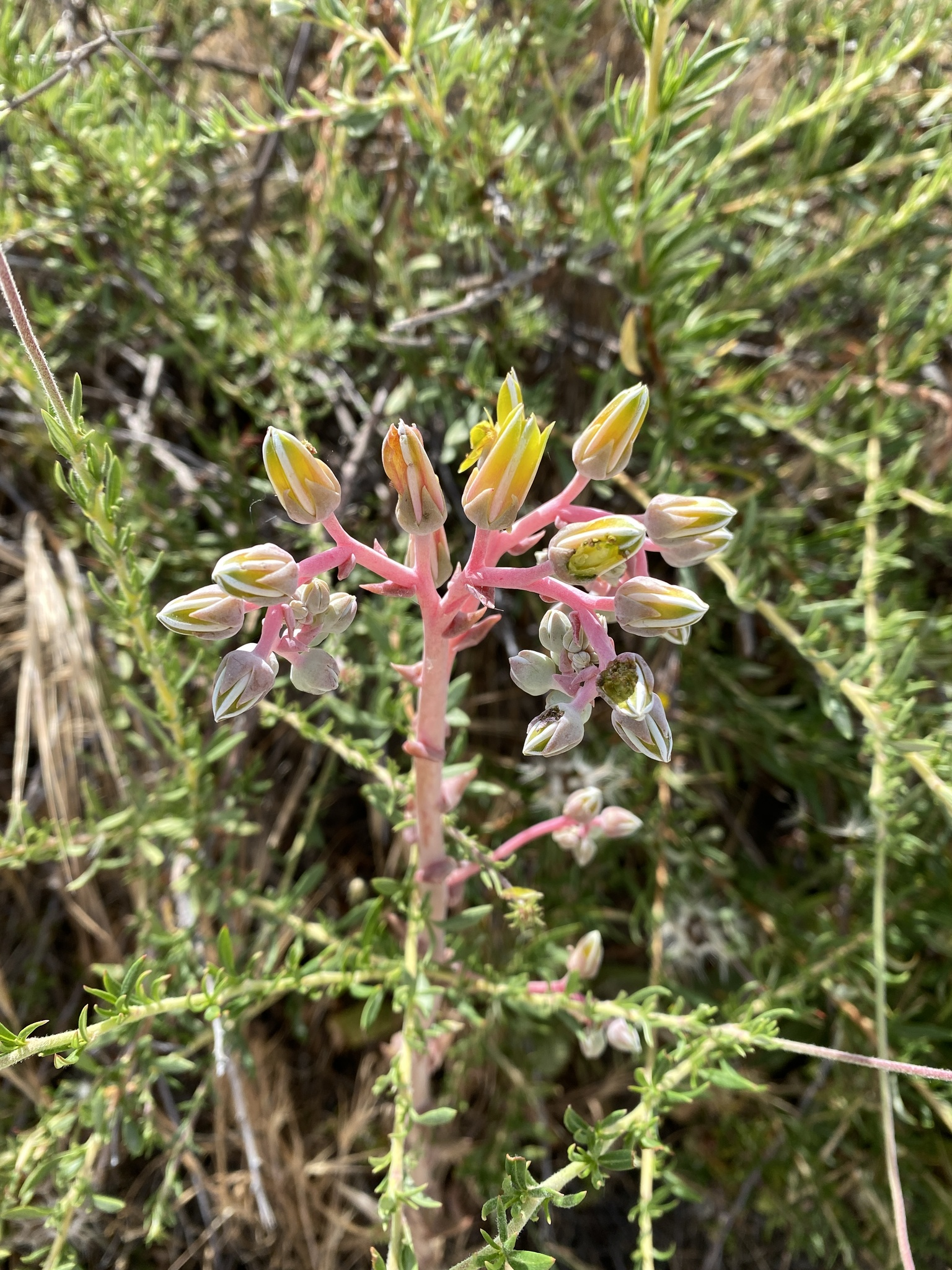
Yellow flowers, gray sepals, and a pink peduncle. Note the circinate terminal branches with budding flowers

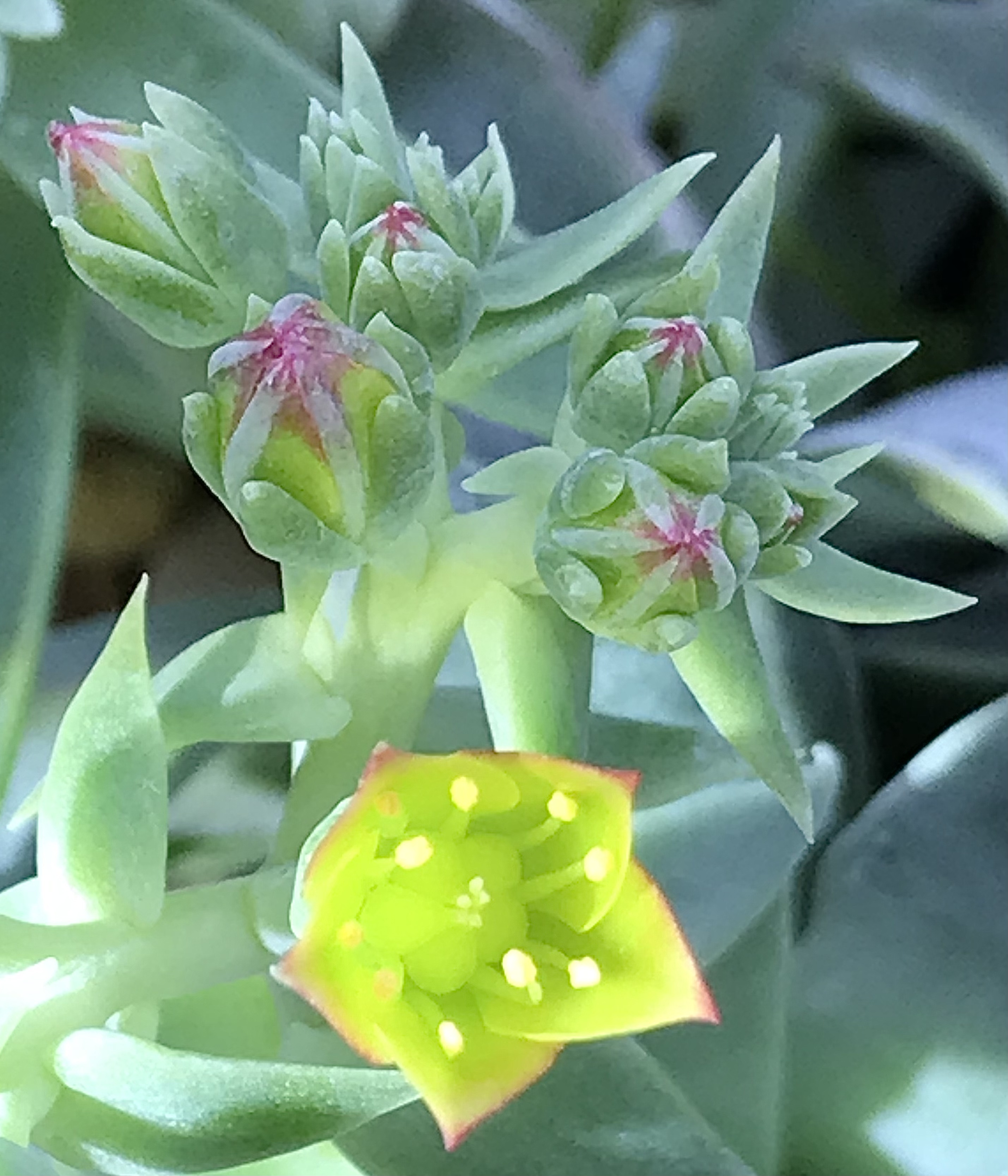
Inflorescence with developing buds, showing detail of interior of a single open flower, Davies Alpine House, Kew Gardens

The chromosome number is typically tetraploid, 2n = 68 / n = 34, but some plants are occasionally octoploid. Diploid plants in montane regions are in fact Dudleya cymosa. Flowering is from April to July.

== Distribution and habitat ==
This plant is widely distributed, occurring from Monterey County and Kern County in the state of California, through coastal Southern California and into Mexico, where it reaches its southern distribution near Ensenada in Baja California, at the Punta Banda. It is also found on the Coronado Islands. It is not particularly hardy to the cold, and is typically found where humidity is not too low, by the coast and in north-facing inland locations.

== Cultivation ==
Dudleya lanceolata is cultivated as an ornamental plant by specialty nurseries, for use in rock gardens, as a potted plant, and a native plant in natural landscaping.
