= La Bufadora =

Natural blowhole on Cape Punta Banda in Baja California, Mexico

Coordinates: 31°43′27″N 116°43′23″W

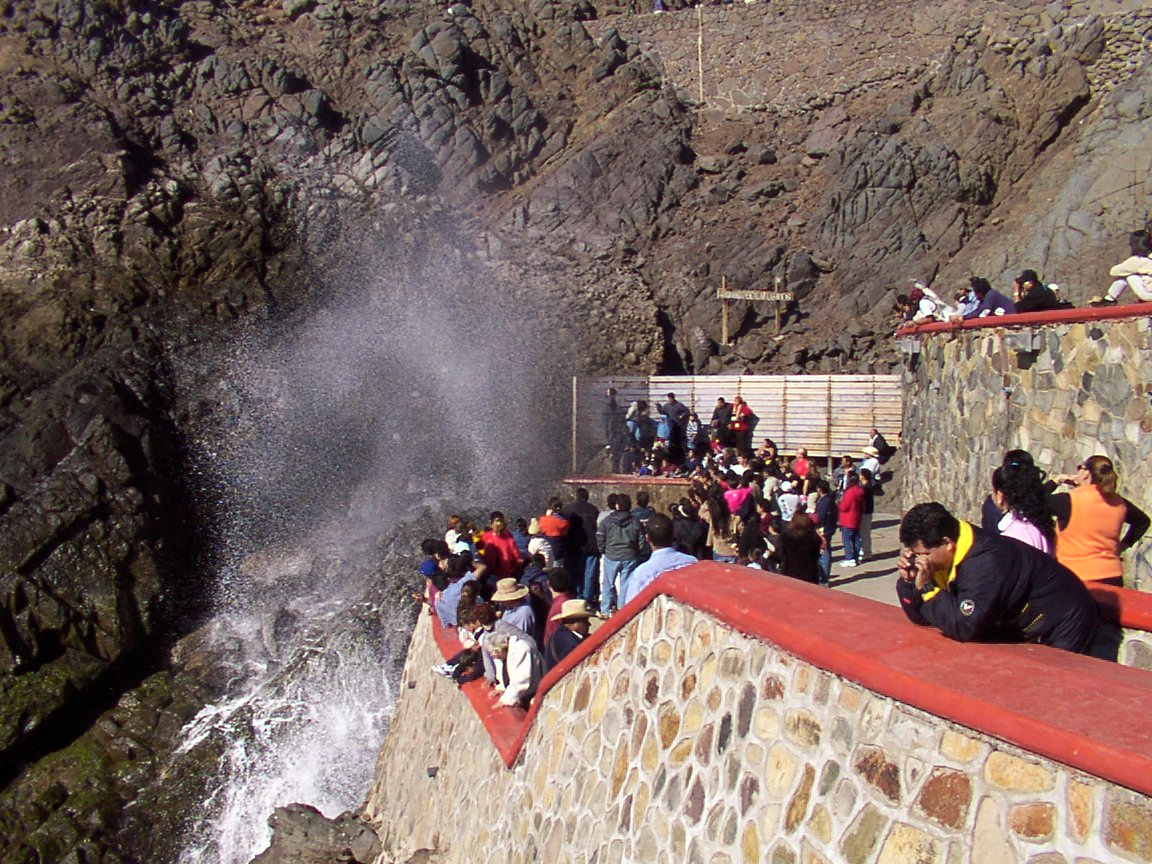
La Bufadora

La Bufadora is a blowhole and tourist attraction located on the Punta Banda Peninsula in Baja California, Mexico, about 27 km (17 mi) south of Ensenada.

== Natural phenomenon ==
La Bufadora is often considered a marine geyser, however, it does not have a thermal source or cause, as geysers do. In this case, the spout of seawater is the result of air, trapped in a sea cave, exploding upwards. Air is forced into the cave by wave action and is released when the water recedes, ejecting water up to 100 ft (30 m) above sea level. This interaction not only creates the spout, but a thunderous noise as well.

The interval between eruptions is fairly constant, and matches the dominant swell, confirming that the activity at La Bufadora is determined by surface ocean waves. Between 2005 and 2011 the recurrence between eruptions was between 13 and 17 seconds.

La Bufadora is one of the largest blowholes in the world.

== Legend ==
The legend regarding La Bufadora is that a whale became trapped in the rocky point and blew water to attract its pod’s attention. Eventually, the whale turned to stone, staying there forever.

== Tourist attraction ==
La Bufadora is one of Ensenada's main tourist attractions, and there are several souvenir and food vendors overlooking the site. In 2017, 150 businesses were operating at La Bufadora.
