= Isla Todos Santos =

Islands in the Southern California Bight off Baja California, Mexico

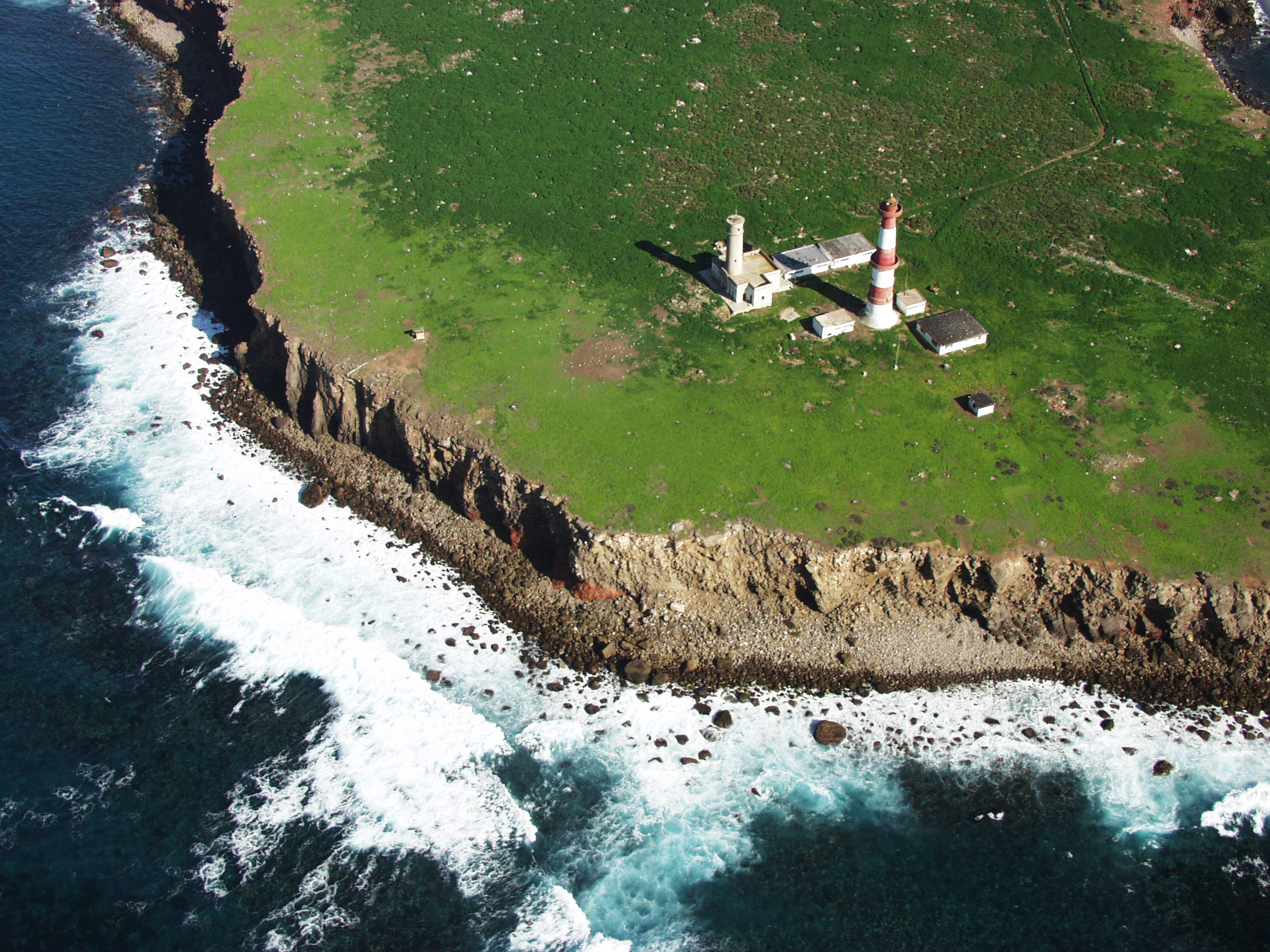
Isla Todos Santos

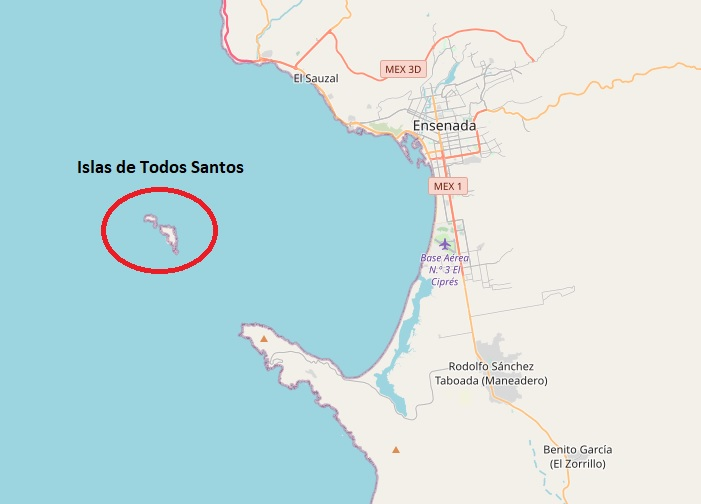
Todos Santos islands location

Isla Todos Santos is a pair of islands about 19.3 km (12.0 mi) off Ensenada, Baja California, at 31°47′59″N 116°47′20″W best known for surfing. Access is only by boat, which can be rented in Ensenada, or La Bufadora. The waves off the smallest island are among the biggest in North America. There are no facilities on the islands except for two lighthouses and a fish farm operation.

== Fauna ==
The islands are (or were) home to Aimophila ruficeps sanctorum, an endemic subspecies of the rufous-crowned sparrow, which is probably extinct. It was previously home to Anthony's woodrat, which is now extinct. It is home to a critically endangered subspecies, the Todos Santos Island kingsnake, of the California mountain kingsnake. The type species of the fish genus Bajacalifornia, Bajacalifornia burragei, was discovered during the USS Albatross deep sea expedition off the coast of Todos Santos Bay in 1911.

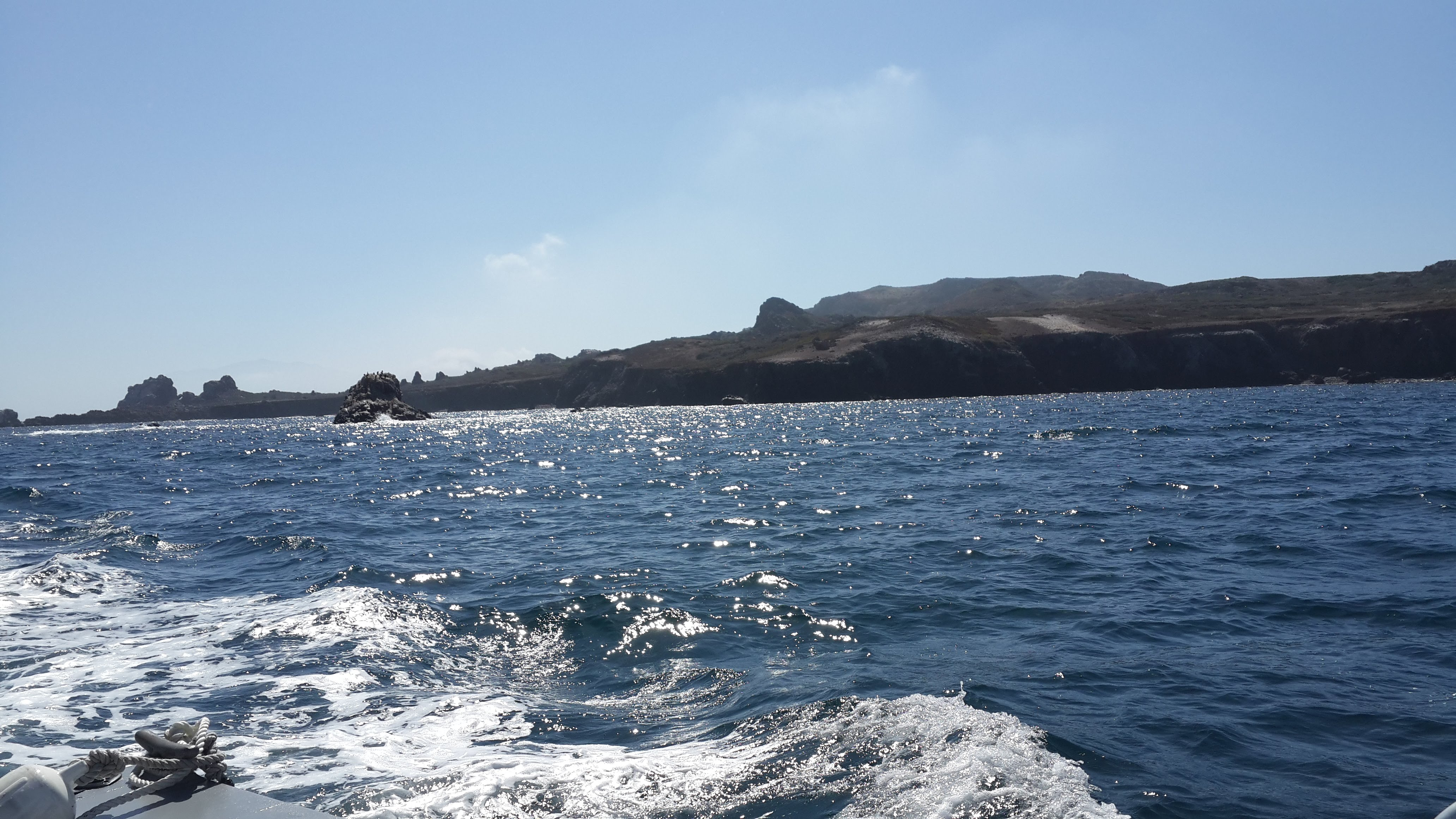
View of Isla Todos Santos from a boat
