= Bryant's woodrat =

Conservation status
- Least Concern (IUCN 3.1)

Scientific classification
- Kingdom: Animalia
- Phylum: Chordata
- Class: Mammalia
- Order: Rodentia
- Family: Cricetidae
- Subfamily: Neotominae
- Genus: Neotoma
- Species: N. bryanti

Binomial name
- Neotoma bryanti Merriam, 1887

Species of rodent

Bryant's woodrat (Neotoma bryanti) is a species of new-world rodent in the family Cricetidae native to the Southwestern United States and Mexico. It is named after Walter E. Bryant, who collected the holotype of this species in 1885.
