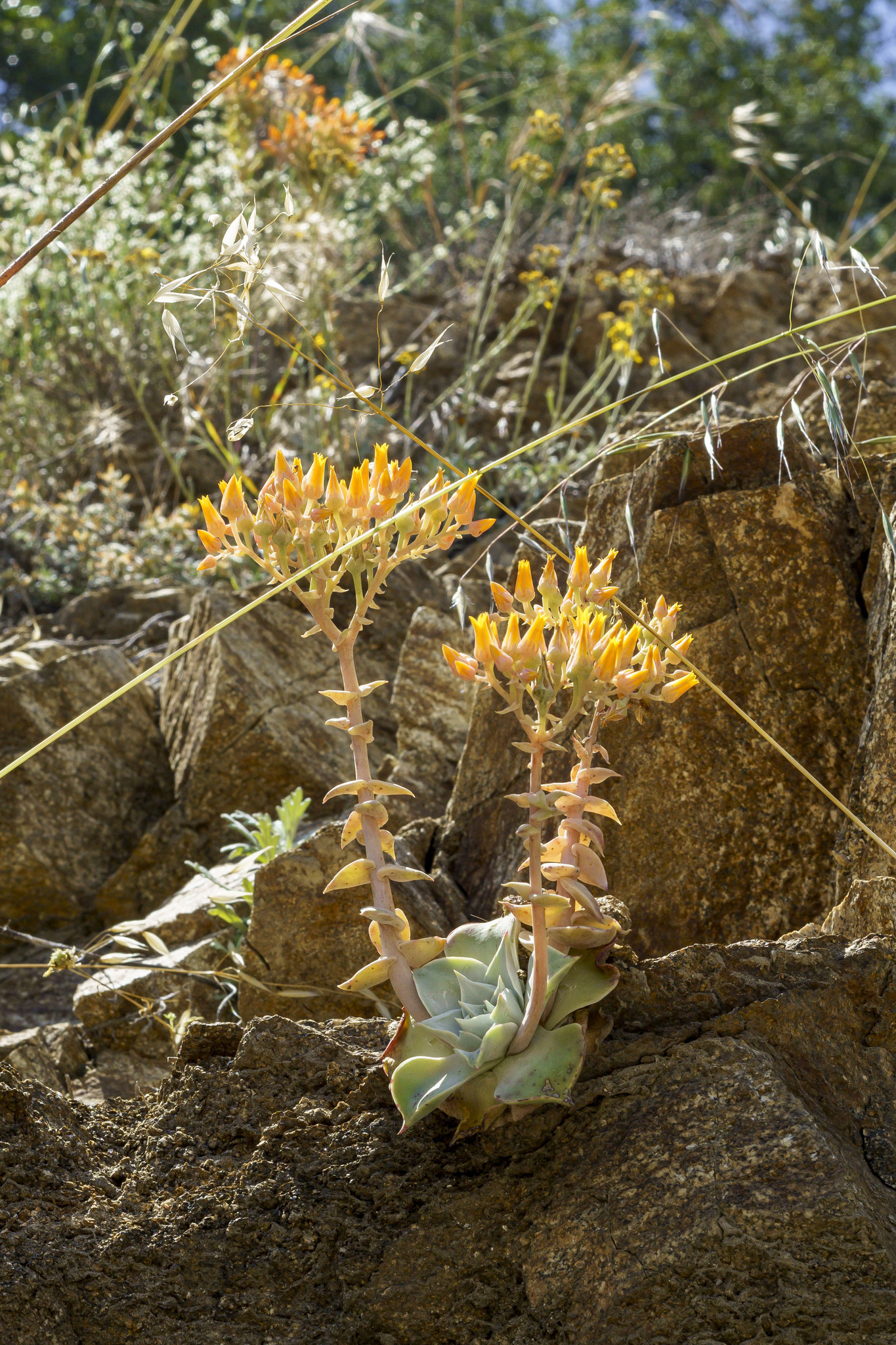
- Flowering in the San Bernardino Mountains.

Conservation status
- Apparently Secure (NatureServe)

Scientific classification
- Kingdom: Plantae
- Clade: Tracheophytes
- Clade: Angiosperms
- Clade: Eudicots
- Order: Saxifragales
- Family: Crassulaceae
- Genus: Dudleya
- Species: D. cymosa
- Subspecies: D. c. subsp. pumila

Trinomial name
- Dudleya cymosa subsp. pumila (Rose) K.M.Nakai

Synonyms
- Dudleya pumila Rose; Cotyledon pumila (Rose) Fedde; Echeveria parva Berger

= Dudleya cymosa subsp. pumila =

Subspecies of plant

Dudleya cymosa subsp. pumila, most commonly known as the low canyon dudleya, chalky canyon dudleya or California live-forever, is a species of perennial succulent plant. It has diamond to spoon shaped leaves, sometimes coated with a fine white powder, and in May through July, bright red, orange or yellow flowers adorn the short inflorescence. A leaf succulent primarily found growing in rocky cliffs and slopes, it is endemic to California, and grows in the Transverse Ranges and South Coast Ranges, with some outlying populations. A variable plant, in some localities it is difficult to distinguish from other plants in the genus.

== Description ==
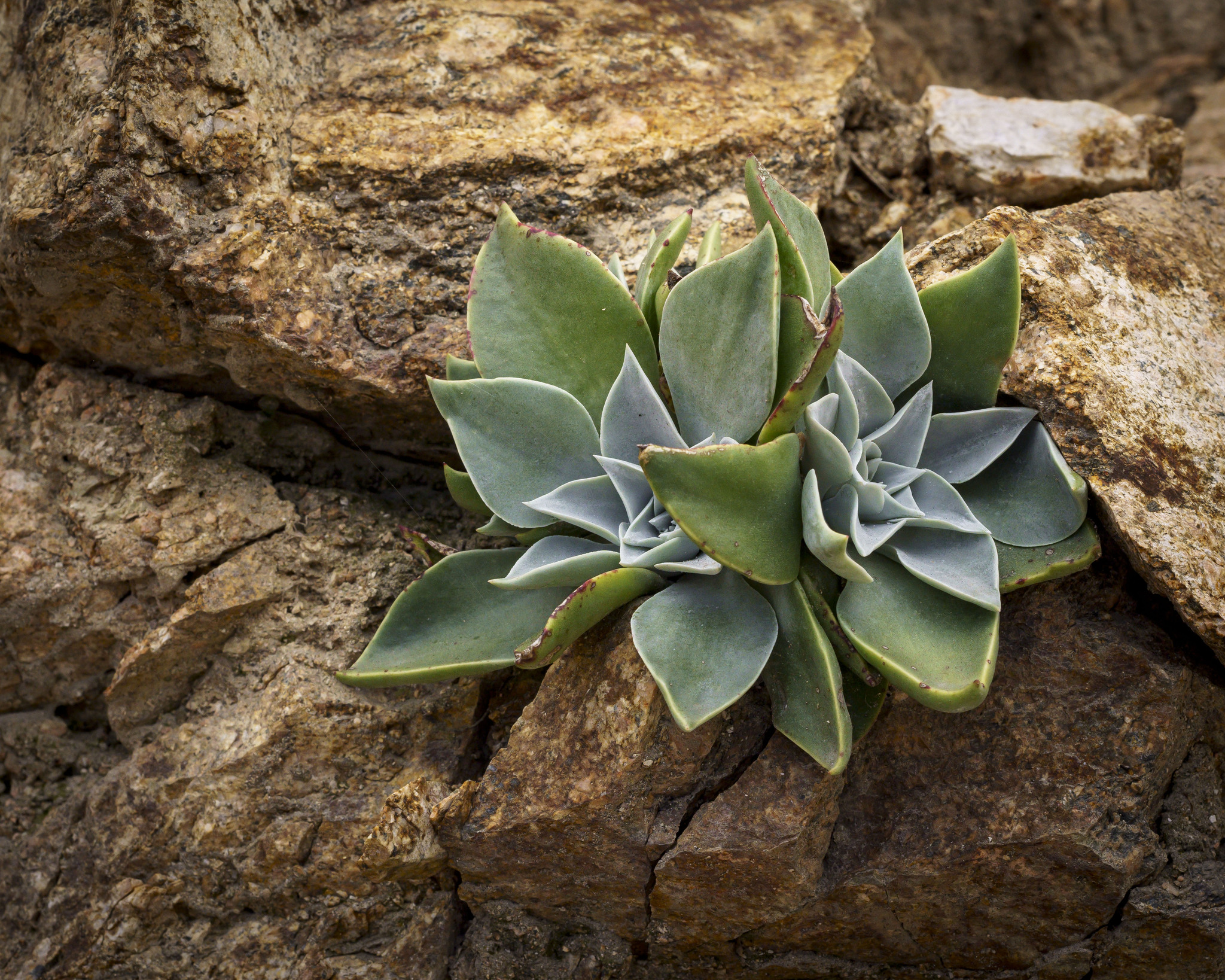
Two rosettes

The plant has diamond to spoon shaped leaves, with a height of 5 to 15 cm, and reddish-orange or yellow flowers.

=== Vegetative morphology ===
The stem is typically 1 to 2 cm wide, crowned by an apical rosette. The rosettes are often solitary, although some plants may have branching stems with 2-5 rosettes. Each rosette is 4 to 10 cm wide, with 10 to 25 leaves. The leaves are green, and some are glaucous or even farinose, although few are green in times of drought. The leaves are shaped rhombic-oblanceolate to spatulate, with the leaf margins (edges) folding up at the widest point, and the tip shaped generally short-acuminate to mucronate, more or less recurved. The leaves are 1.5 to 5 cm long, and 10 to 30 mm wide.

=== Reproductive morphology ===
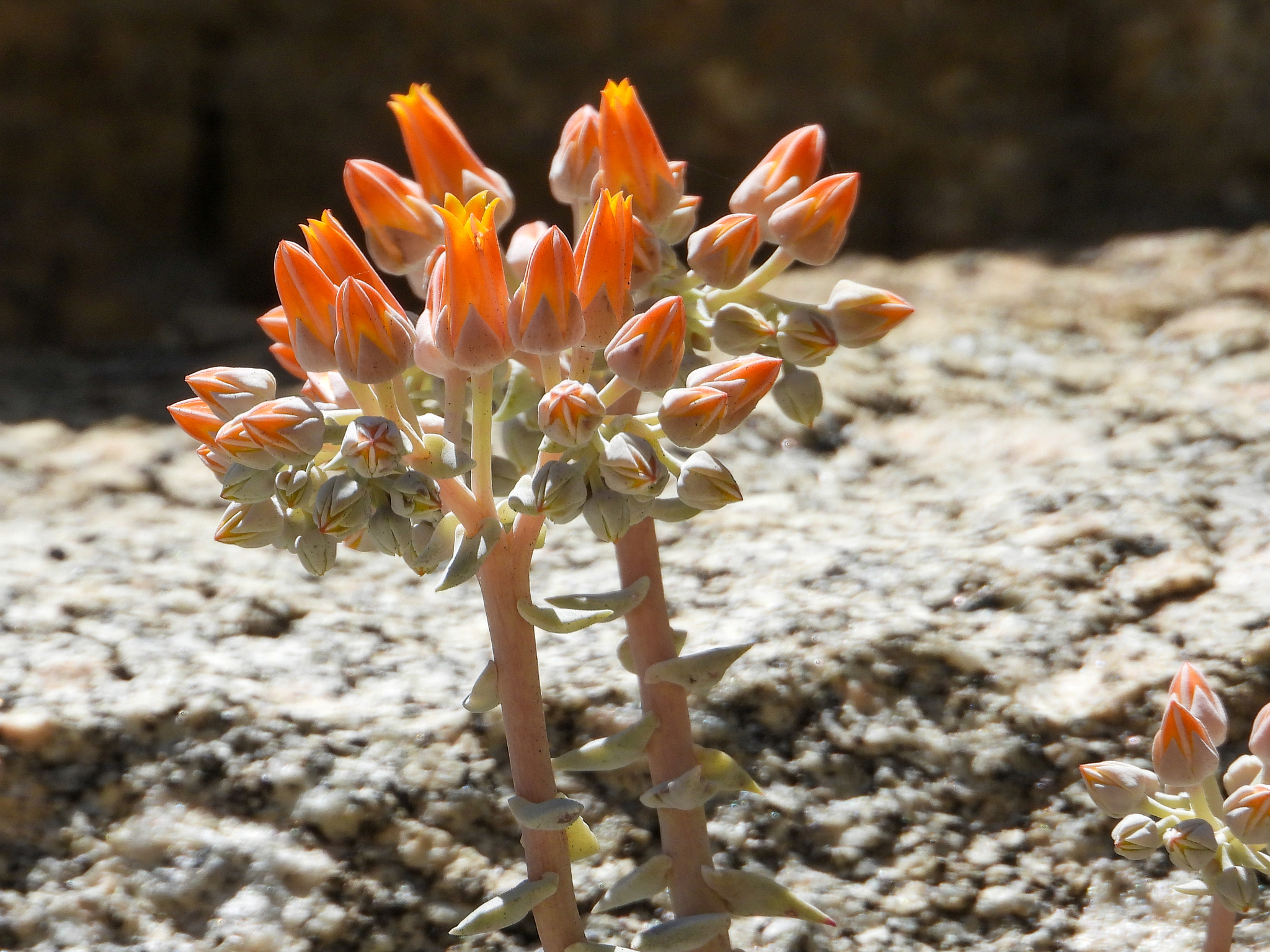
A detail of the inflorescence

The inflorescence is more or less symmetrical on the radial axis. The peduncle is 5 to 30 cm tall, and 3 to 10 mm wide, and erect. There are 5 to 20 bracts on the floral shoots, with the lower bracts more or less not plump. The internodes are greater than 5 mm distant from each other. There are generally 3 first degree branches on the inflorescence, and the terminal branches are 1 to 3 cm long, with 3 to 6 flowers. The flowers have bright yellow to red petals.

The majority of the plants in this species are diploid (n = 17), meaning they have two sets of chromosomes. Some plants found at a lower altitude may resemble this species, but have a chromosome count of (n = 34), making them tetraploid, or with four sets of chromosomes. As the species Dudleya lanceolata is tetraploid and often sympatric with other species such as D. c. subsp. pumila, these plants are instead placed within lanceolata.

== Taxonomy ==
The holotype was collected by H. M. Hall in the San Bernardino Mountains, with the taxon originally described as Dudleya pumila by Nathaniel Lord Britton and Joseph Nelson Rose during their revision of North American Crassulaceae. In 1902, Hermann E. Hasse collected a plant growing on the rocky banks of San Gabriel Canyon at 600 to 700 m in altitude. Hasse's plant was then described by Britton and Rose as Dudleya minor. In 1957, botanist Reid Moran combined Dudleya minor under Dudleya cymosa, forming Dudleya cymosa subsp. minor. The majority of Dudleya cymosa plants in Southern California were thereafter assigned to this subspecies.

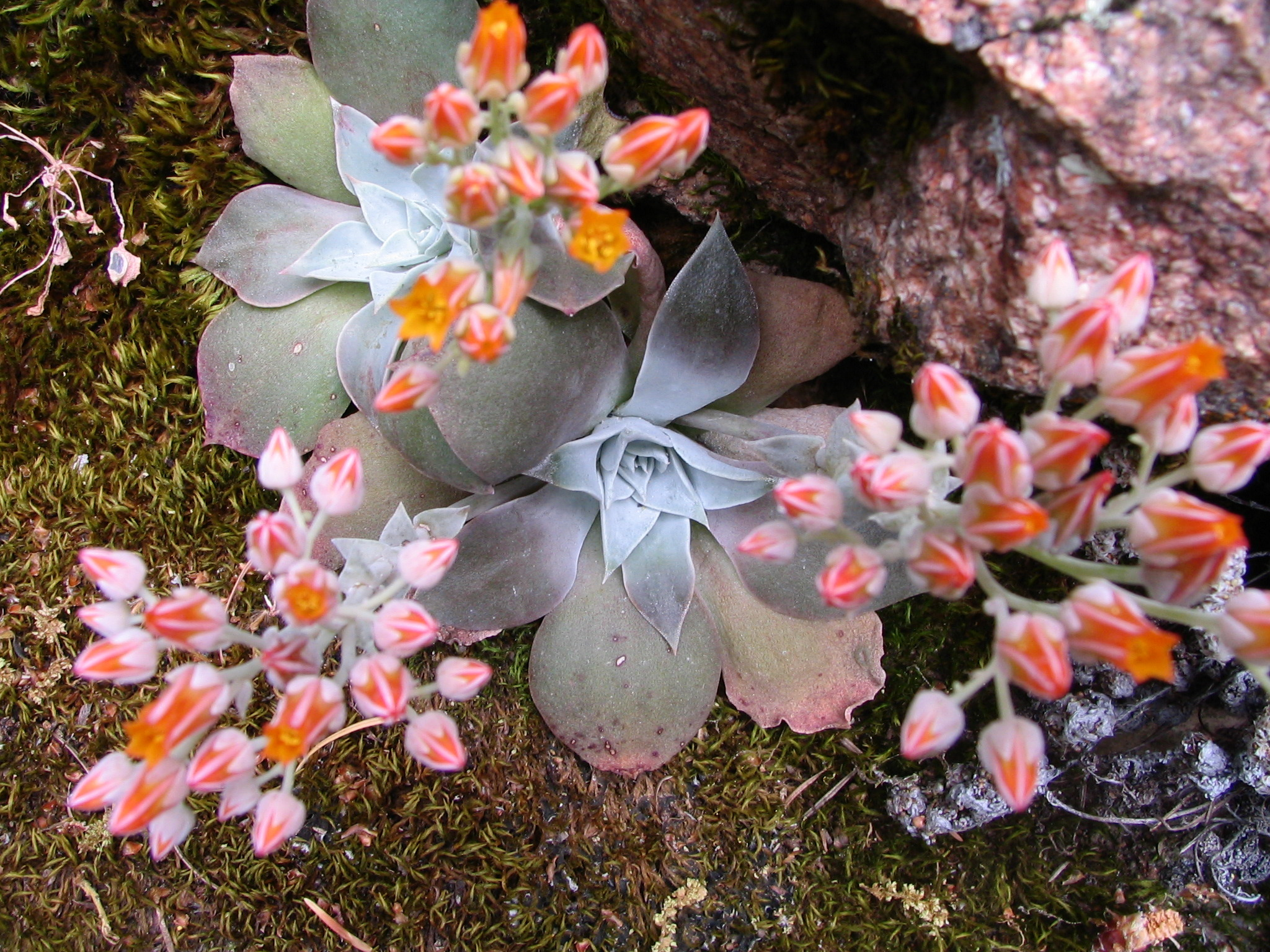
Plants in flower

Research by botanist Kei M. Nakai showed that the type specimen of Dudleya minor, along with plants at the type locality, in the lower altitudes of San Gabriel Canyon, were in fact representative of Dudleya lanceolata, on the basis of morphology and chromosome count. This meant that the Dudleya pumila specimen by Hall was the accurate representative of Dudleya cymosa plants in the range. Nakai then combined Dudleya pumila into Dudleya cymosa subsp. pumila. The species Dudleya lanceolata and Dudleya cymosa can be separated on the basis that lanceolata is tetraploid and occurs at lower elevations, while cymosa is diploid and occurs at higher elevations.

A phylogenetic analysis in 2013 did not provide any major revelations for the position of this subspecies, placing it as unresolved but emerging from a large polytomy at the base of the generic tree. Others members of the species Dudleya cymosa were better resolved, such as Dudleya cymosa subsp. paniculata and Dudleya cymosa subsp. cymosa, which are closely related with Dudleya abramsii subsp. setchellii.

Hybrids with Dudleya lanceolata and Dudleya caespitosa are suspected.

== Distribution and habitat ==
This species is endemic to the state of California. It has been reported from the Santa Lucia Range in Monterey County south to the San Gabriel and San Bernardino Mountains of southern California. It is also found on Santiago Peak in the Santa Ana Mountains of western Riverside and Orange County. It occurs on rocky cliffs and slopes. It is found 100 to 1800 meters from Santa Barbara County north, and from 600 to 2600 meters from Ventura County south.

== Ecology ==
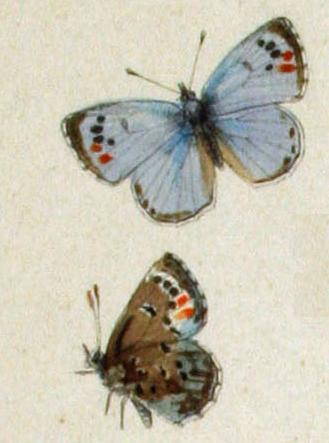
Philotes sonorensis, the Sonoran blue

The Sonoran blue (Philotes sonorensis) butterfly uses D. cymosa subsp. pumila (Note: See Taxonomy. Written in Shields (1973) as Dudleya cymosa subsp. minor.) as a larval foodplant, with the butterfly closely following this species' range from Monterey County through the Transverse Ranges. The butterfly lays the eggs on the upper parts of the leaves near the margin, and on the small leaves near the apical meristem at the center of the rosette. Plants with the eggs are usually in exposed areas, rather than partial shade. Once the larvae emerge from the eggs, they burrow into the Dudleya leaf in close proximity to their egg, feeding head down and burrowing deep within the leaf. Others may crawl over the leaf surface. The larvae may be spotted due to the disturbed leaves and frass left behind.

The relationship of this butterfly with Dudleya potentially has taxonomic implications for the plants. Botanist Reid Moran described three subgenera of Dudleya; Stylophyllum, Dudleya, and Hasseanthus. The subgenus Dudleya consists of broad-leaved rosette-forming plants with connate petals adapted to hummingbird pollinators. Subgenera Stylophyllum and Hasseanthus have broad, open flowers, with Stylophyllum consisting of evergreen plants with pencil-shaped leaves, and Hasseanthus consisting of deciduous, geophytic plants. This species is a member of the subgenus Dudleya.

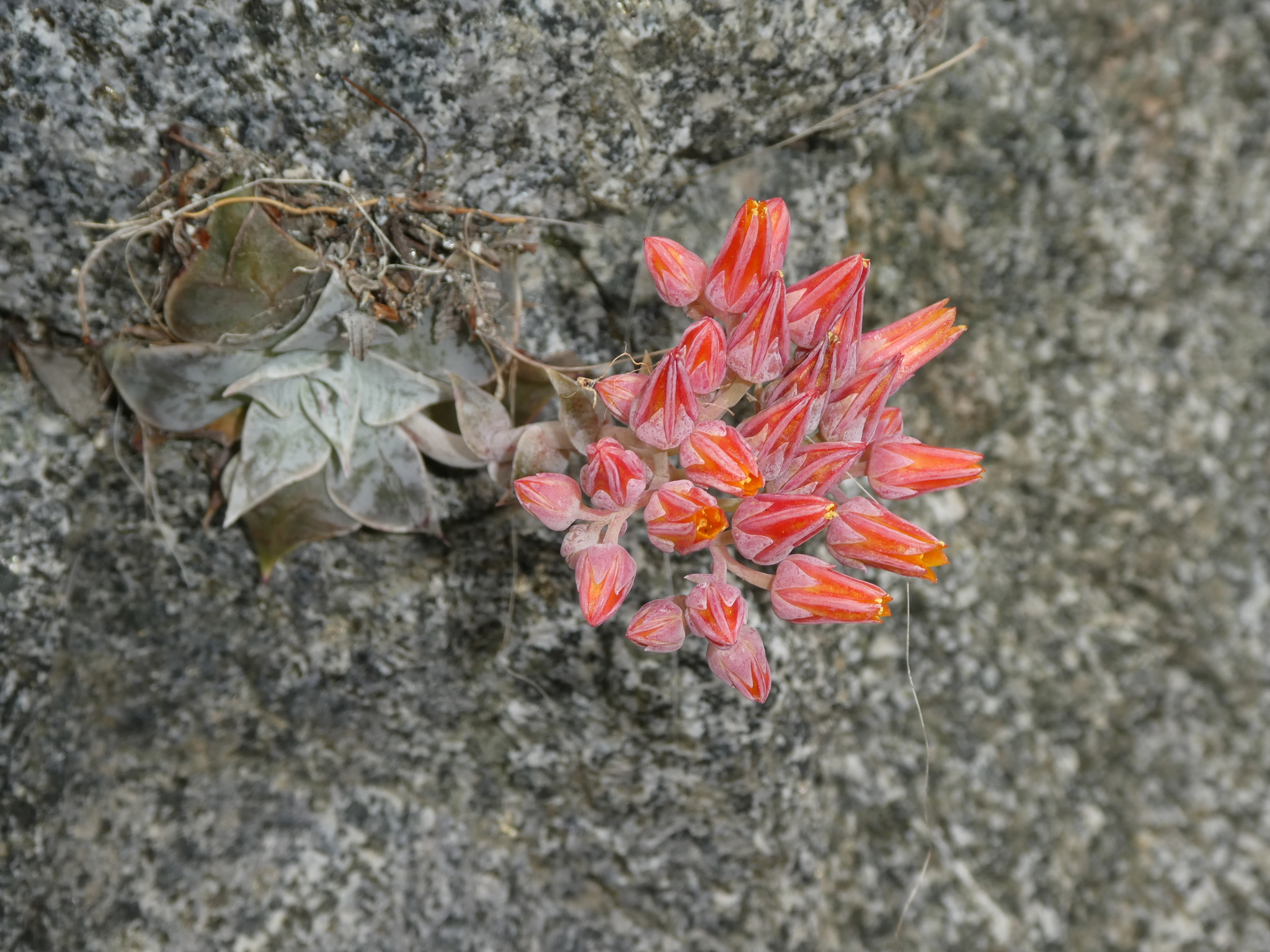
Growing on a rocky outcrop

Entomologist Oakley Shields noted an emerging pattern when examining the Dudleya foodplants of Philotes sonorensis, as most of the foodplants are evolutionarily intermediate species within the genus. This species in particular has chromosomal resemblance to the Hasseanthus clade, which appears to place it as a primitive member of the subgenus Dudleya. The subgenus Dudleya itself may also have evolved from the subgenus Stylophyllum, as indicated by the relationships between Dudleya stolonifera (a primitive member of the Dudleya subgenus) and Dudleya edulis (an advanced member of the Stylophyllum subgenus), both of which are used by the butterfly. In contrast, other species such as Dudleya pulverulenta, regarded as the most advanced member of the genus, and Dudleya blochmaniae, a primitive Hasseanthus plant, are not utilized by the butterfly.

In spite of the perceived patterns between the butterfly's foodplants and the taxonomy of the genus Dudleya, recent phylogenetic analysis has cast doubt on the artificial divisions of Dudleya. The Hasseanthus species may not be "primitive" and in fact may represent a derived subgroup with plesiomorphic features, Reid Moran and Shields had noted the taxonomic difficulties and the failure of the subgenus Dudleya to be easily differentiated.

Hummingbirds feed on its nectar.

== Gallery ==
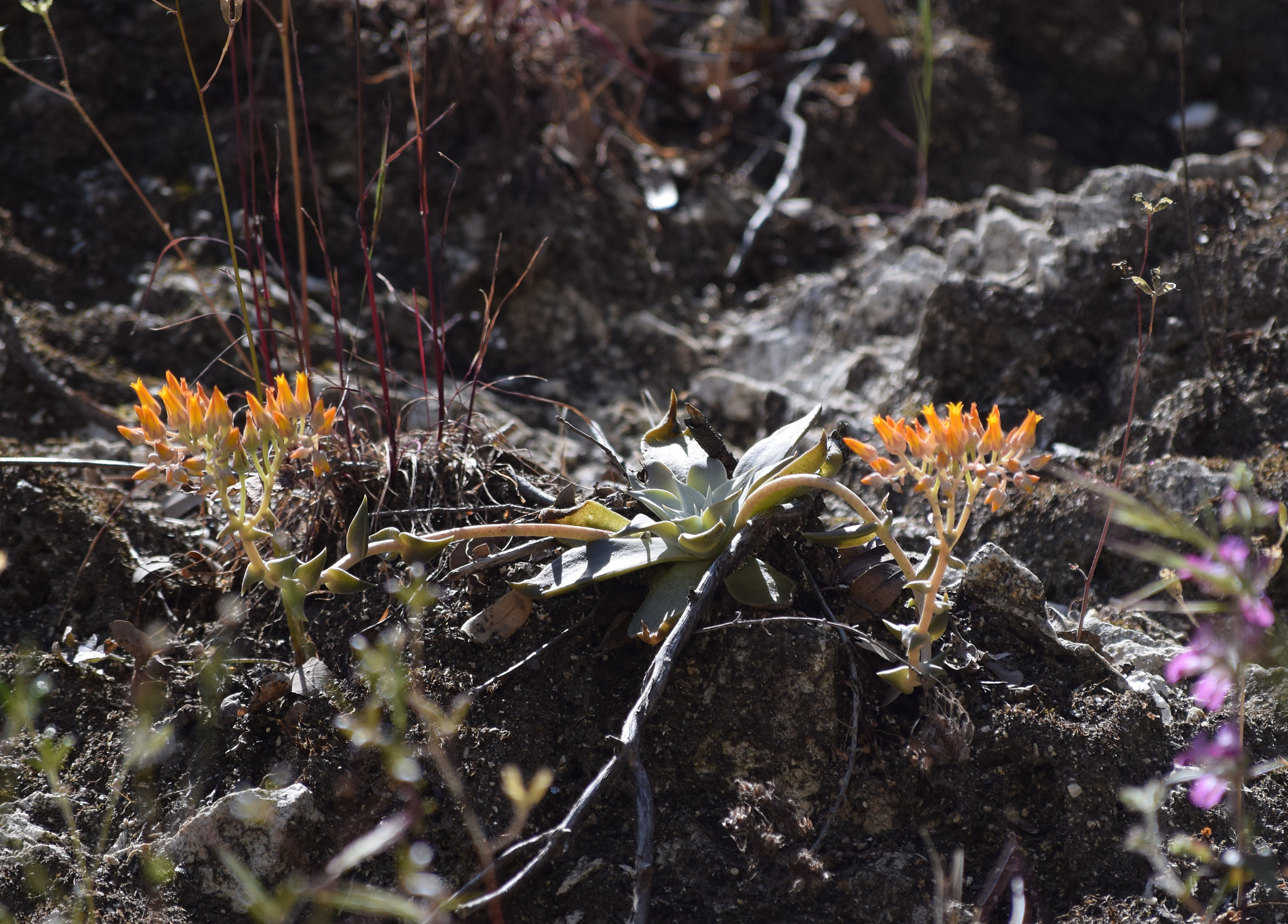
A plant with two inflorescences

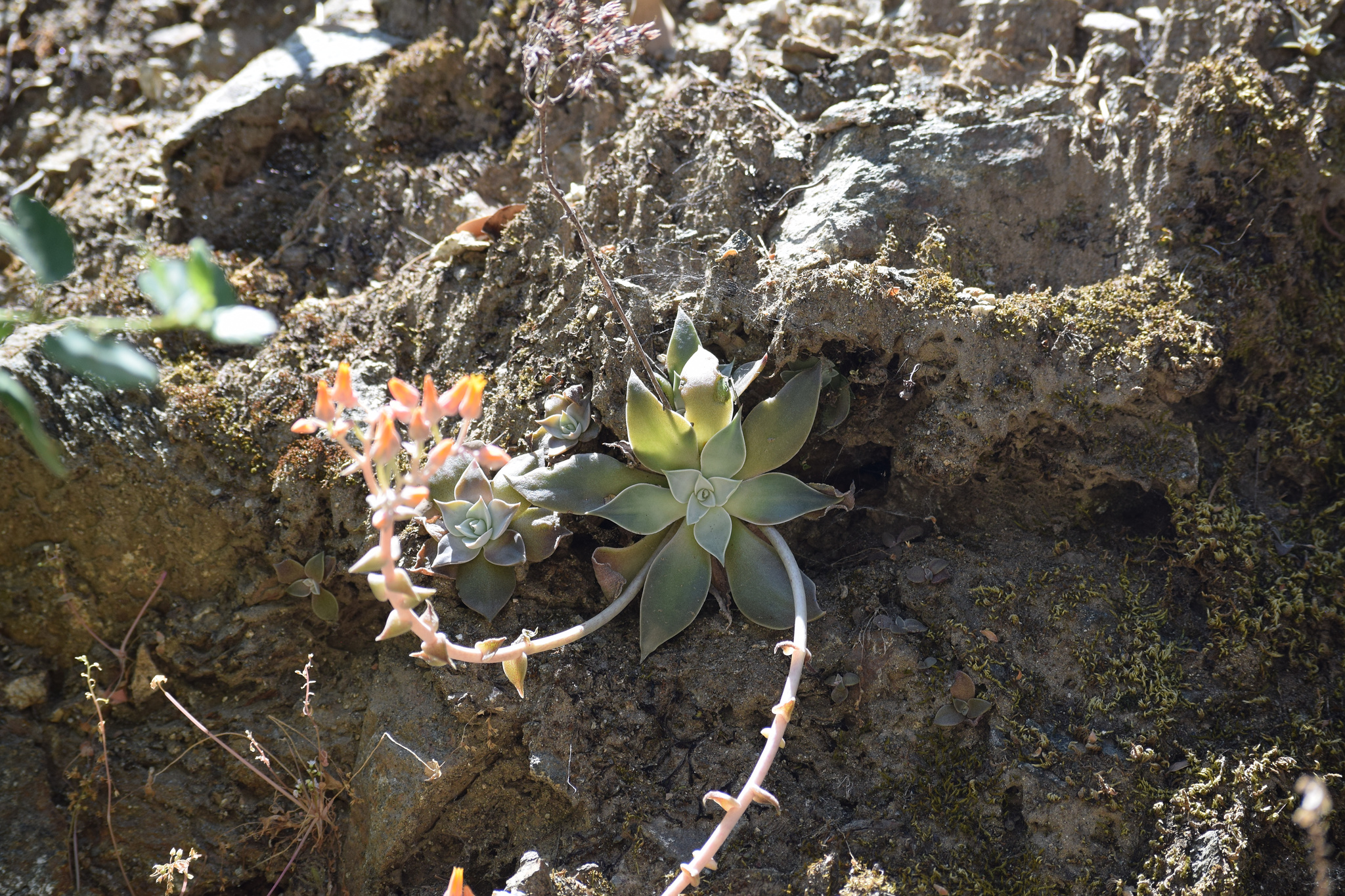
Plant with inflorescences

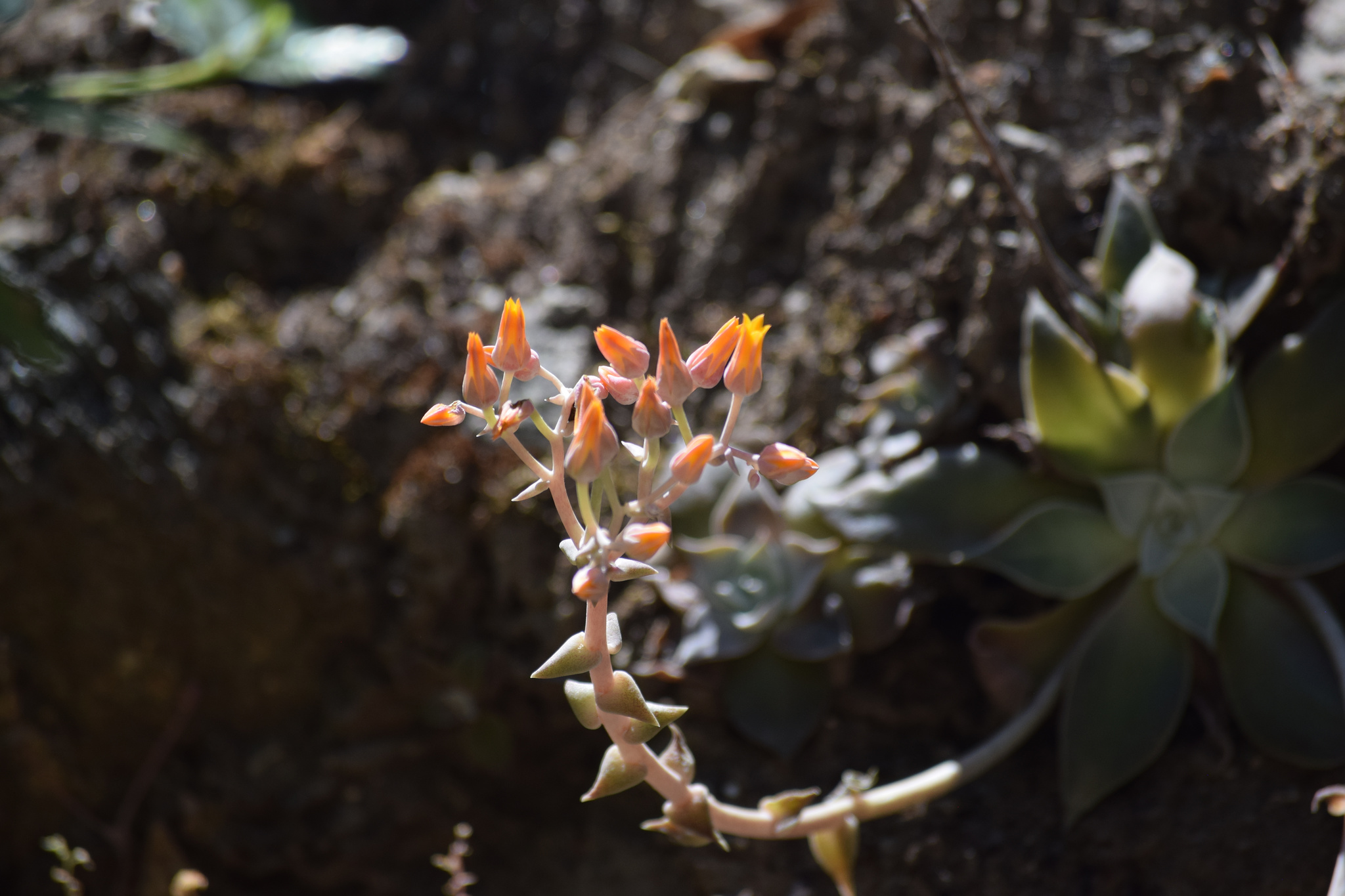
Detail of the inflorescence

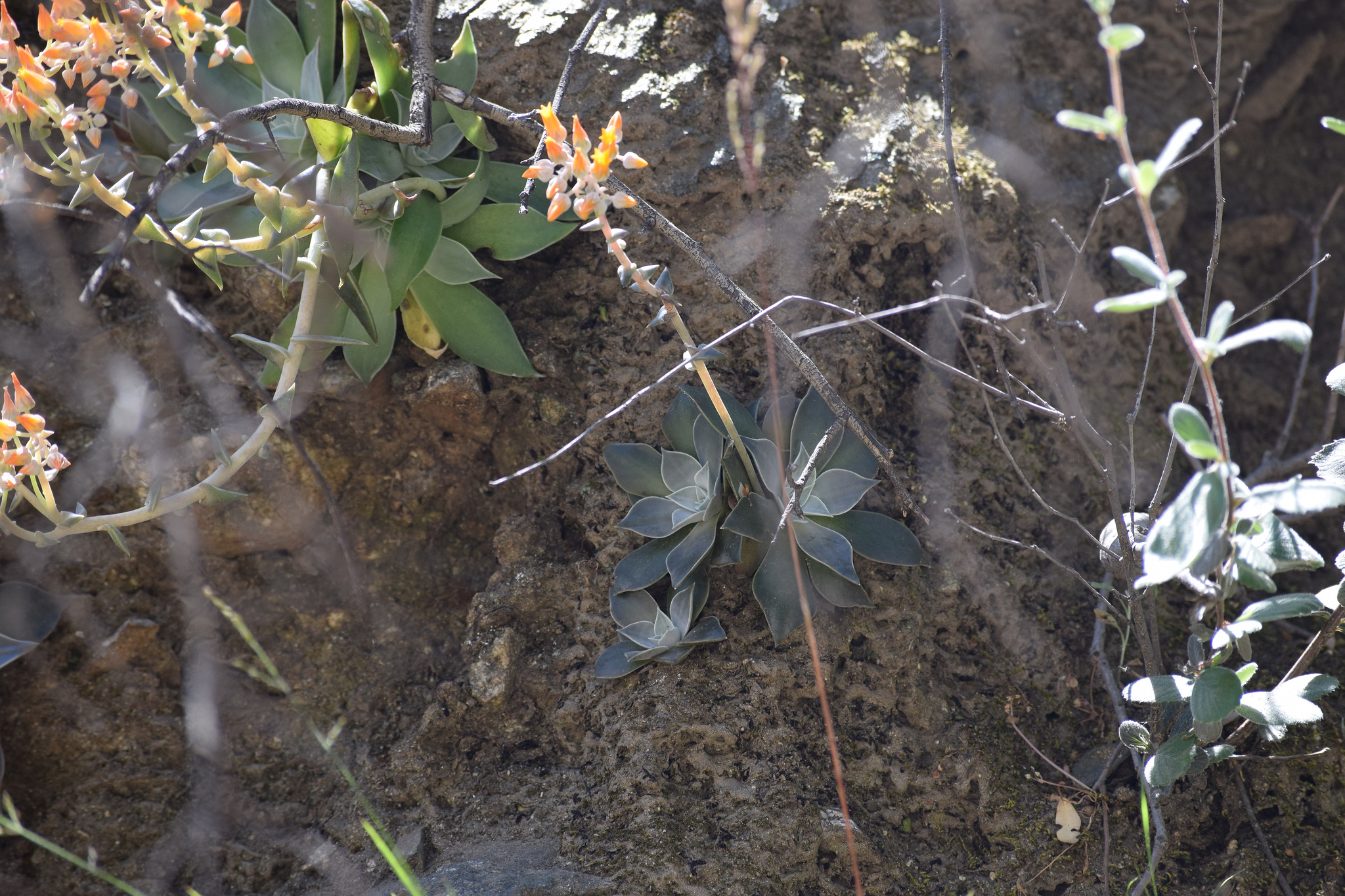
Multiple rosettes on a shady ledge

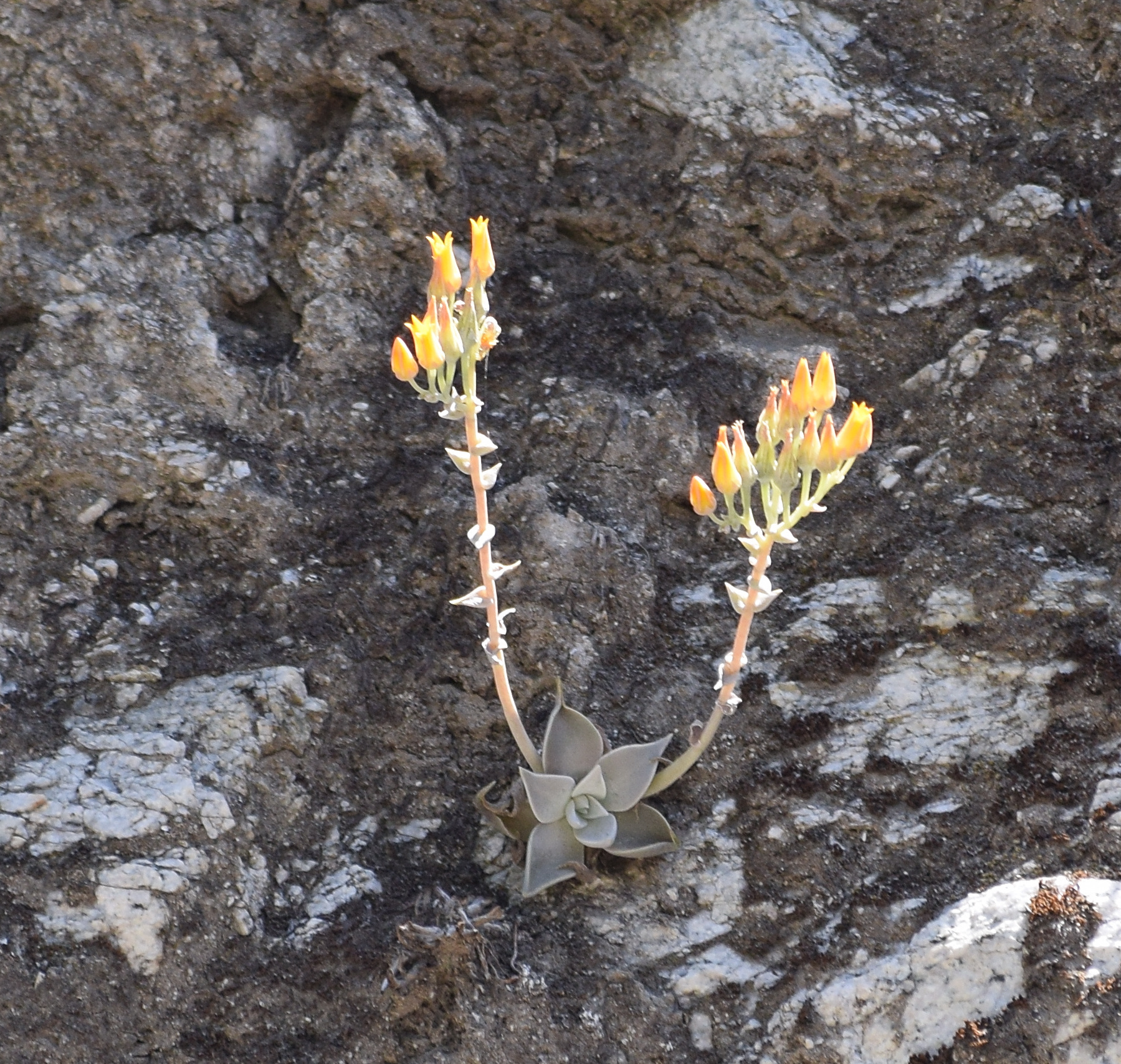
A smaller plant, with two inflorescences
