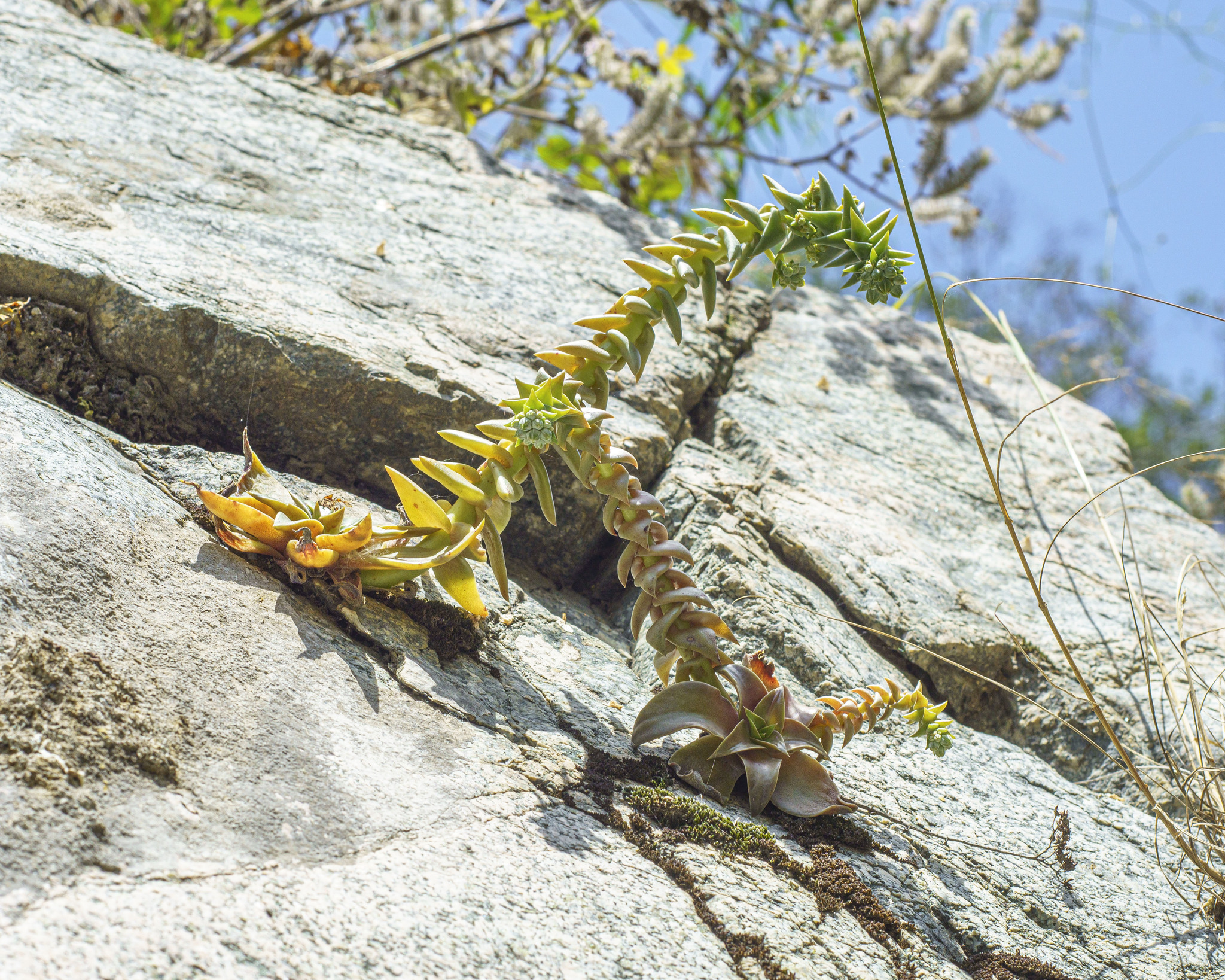
- Two plants of subspecies crebrifolia just prior to flowering.

Conservation status
- Imperiled (NatureServe)

Scientific classification
- Kingdom: Plantae
- Clade: Embryophytes
- Clade: Tracheophytes
- Clade: Spermatophytes
- Clade: Angiosperms
- Clade: Eudicots
- Order: Saxifragales
- Family: Crassulaceae
- Genus: Dudleya
- Species: D. cymosa
- Subspecies: D. c. subsp. crebrifolia

Trinomial name
- Dudleya cymosa subsp. crebrifolia K.M. Nakai & Verity

= Dudleya cymosa subsp. crebrifolia =

Subspecies of succulent plant

Dudleya cymosa subsp. crebrifolia is a subspecies of succulent plant commonly known as the San Gabriel River dudleya. Endemic to Los Angeles County, California, this very distinct subspecies is only known from the granitic slopes of a few canyons at the foot of the San Gabriel Mountains near Azusa. It is characterized by the tightly spaced bracts along its inflorescence and its mustard-yellow flowers that bloom from late June to July. It grows with another rare endemic, Dudleya densiflora.

== Description ==
=== Characteristics ===
Dudleya cymosa subsp. crebrifolia is characterized by its unusual, tight arrangement of bracts on the floral stem, and mustard-yellow flowers. It is one of the latest-blooming members of Dudleya cymosa, flowering from late June to July (and sometimes August). The chromosome number is n=17, which is the base diploid number for Dudleya.

Subspecies crebrifolia is geographically close to subspecies pumila, and the two share some overlap in the size of their rosettes, but otherwise crebrifolia is very distinct. The floral stems of crebrifolia are much longer, the leaves tend to be more elliptic, and the flowering period is 4 to 6 weeks later than pumila. Additionally, crebrifolia occurs at lower elevations of 350–600 m (1,150–1,970 ft), where as pumila almost always occurs at elevations above 750 m (2,460 ft) with a few exceptions.

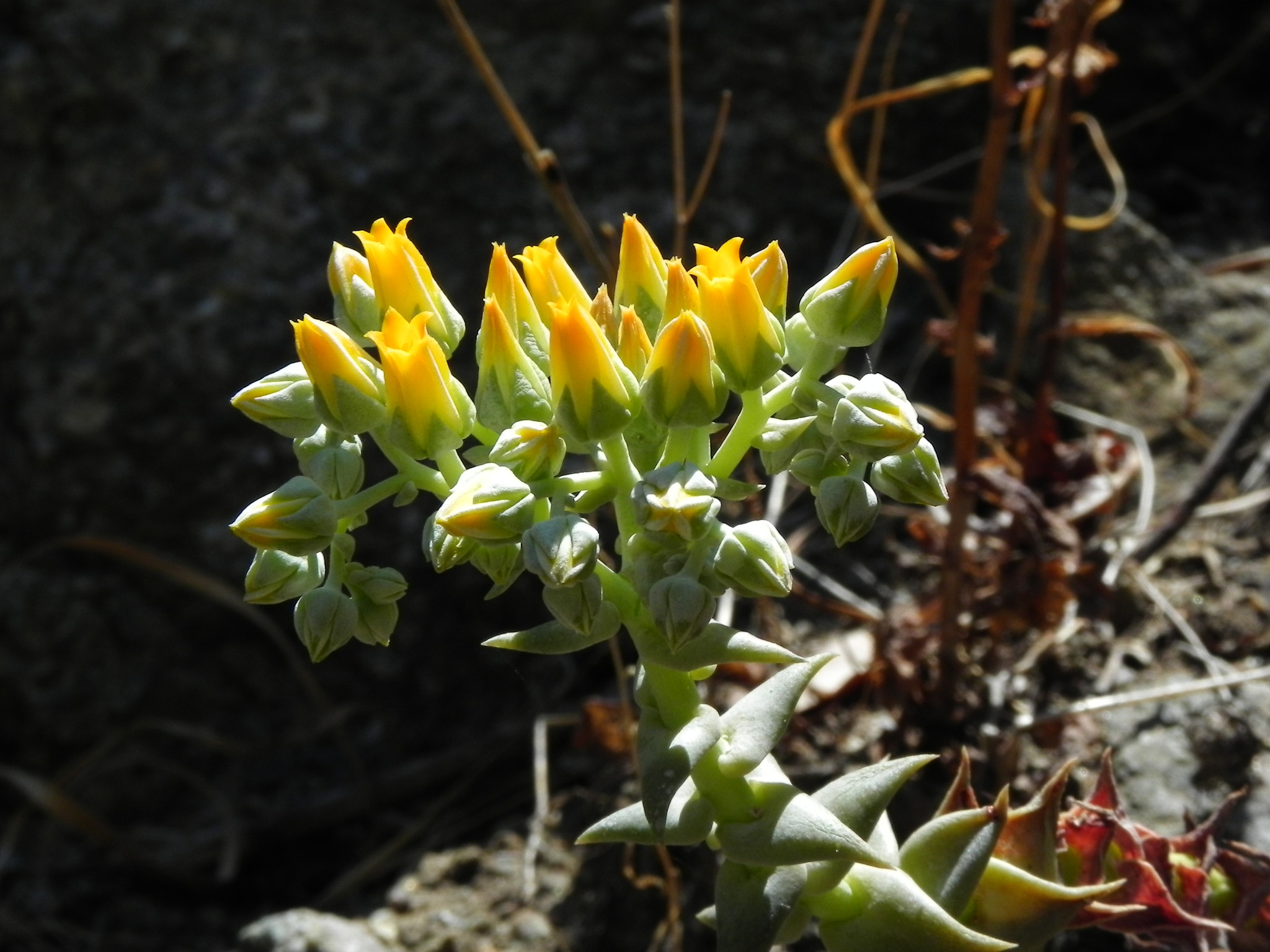
The inflorescence of subsp. crebrifolia, with the characteristic mustard-yellow flowers.

Dudleya lanceolata may grow sympatrically with subsp. crebrifolia and shares some similarities in the size of the rosettes, length of the floral stems, and flower color. However, D. lanceolata has an earlier flower period, a looser inflorescence, and lacks the very tightly-spaced bracts. D. lanceolata is also a tetraploid, unlike the diploid crebrifolia.

=== Morphology ===
The stem measures 1–2 cm (0.39–0.79 in) in diameter, and is rarely branched. Atop a stem is the basal rosette, which is typically 5–12 cm (2.0–4.7 in) in diameter. The basal rosettes are composed of 6 to 15 olive-green leaves that are elliptic to spoon-shaped, measuring up to 10 cm (3.9 in). The underside of the leaves are slightly maroon. Rarely, some examples of this species are glaucous.

The floral stem ranges from 10–30 cm (3.9–11.8 in) tall, with 20 to 50 tightly-spaced bracts attached through most of its length. The inflorescence is usually radially symmetric, and is composed of 2 to 4 branches that rebranch 1 to 2 more times, with the terminal branches 2–10 cm (0.79–3.94 in) long with 2 to 15 flowers. The flowers are on pedicels 3–8 mm (0.12–0.31 in) long. The petals of the flowers are mustard yellow, with glaucous midribs, measuring 9–10 mm (0.35–0.39 in) long and fused for 1–1.5 mm (0.039–0.059 in) of their length.

== Taxonomy ==
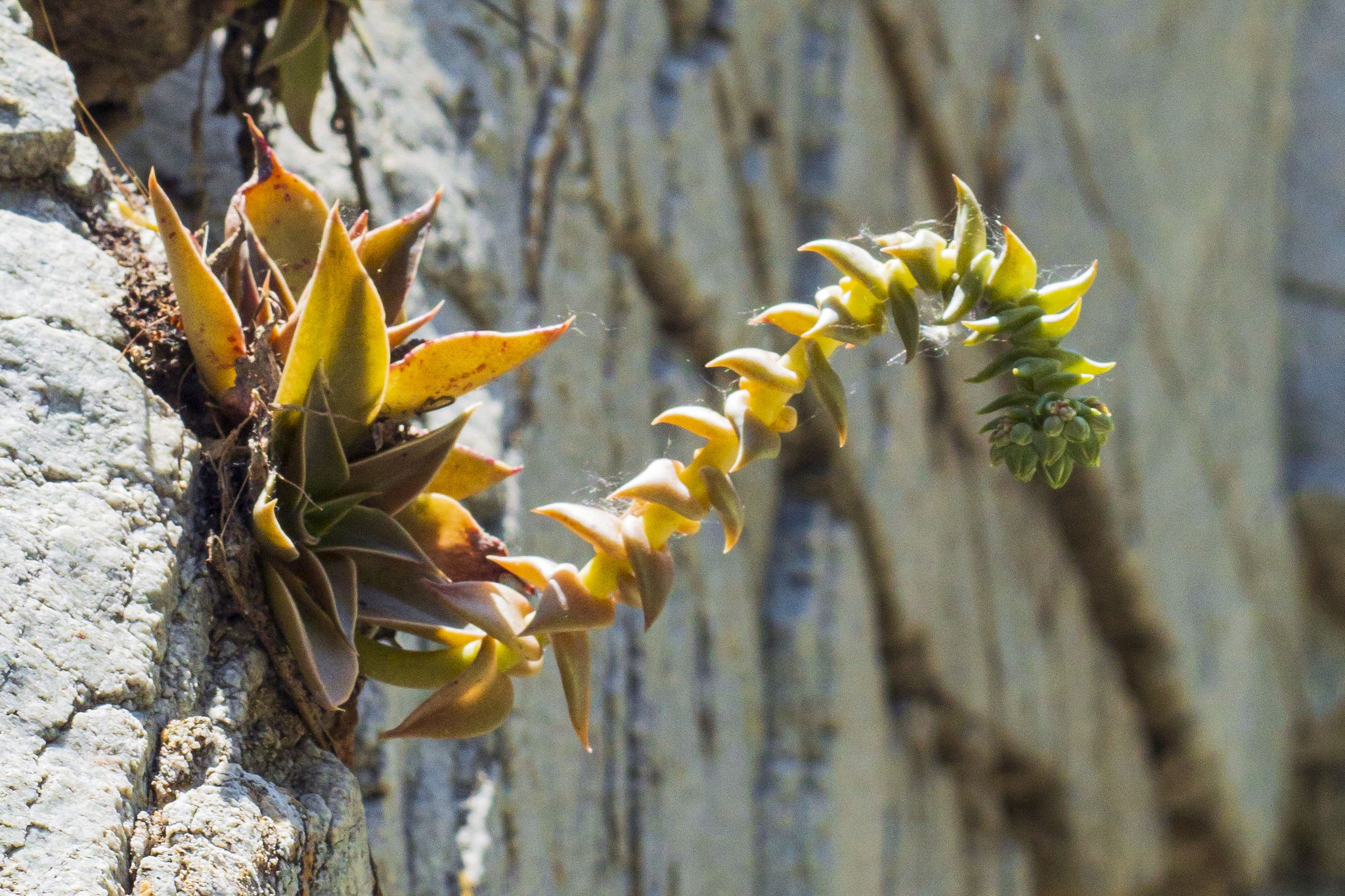
A plant with developing inflorescence. Note the dense bracts.

This plant was first collected by Anstruther Davidson in Fish Canyon in the early 20th century. In 1923, Davidson suggested to Joseph Nelson Rose that his collection might represent a new species. The plants were finally given taxonomic recognition in 1987 when Kei M. Nakai and David Verity described the subspecies based on a 1981 collection by Nakai in Fish Canyon.

The subspecific epithet crebrifolia is Botanical Latin for "closely-leaved", referring to the tightly-spaced bracts on the peduncle.

== Distribution and habitat ==
Dudleya cymosa subsp. crebrifolia is a narrow endemic to Los Angeles County, California, where it is only found in a small number of canyons at the foothills of the San Gabriel Mountains near Azusa. There are six known occurrences, most of which are on U.S. Forest Service land, but a small number are on private property. The populations on private property are threatened by mining, particularly at the type locality of Fish Canyon, where a granite quarry operates.

The subspecies primarily grows on steep granitic slopes and cliffs, sometimes in association with another rare Dudleya, Dudleya densiflora, and the more common Dudleya lanceolata. Most plants occur at elevations of 350–600 m (1,150–1,970 ft).
