= Philotes (disambiguation) =

Philotes may refer to:

- Philotes (mythology), a minor Greek Goddess, the personification of affection; she belongs in a group of several deities of love: Agape (altruistic love of mankind), Philia (friendly love), Eros (sensual love) and Storge (the love for children and animals)
- Philotes, the plural form of a fictional particle in Orson Scott Card's Ender's Game series
- Philotes (butterfly) a genus of "Blue" butterflies
