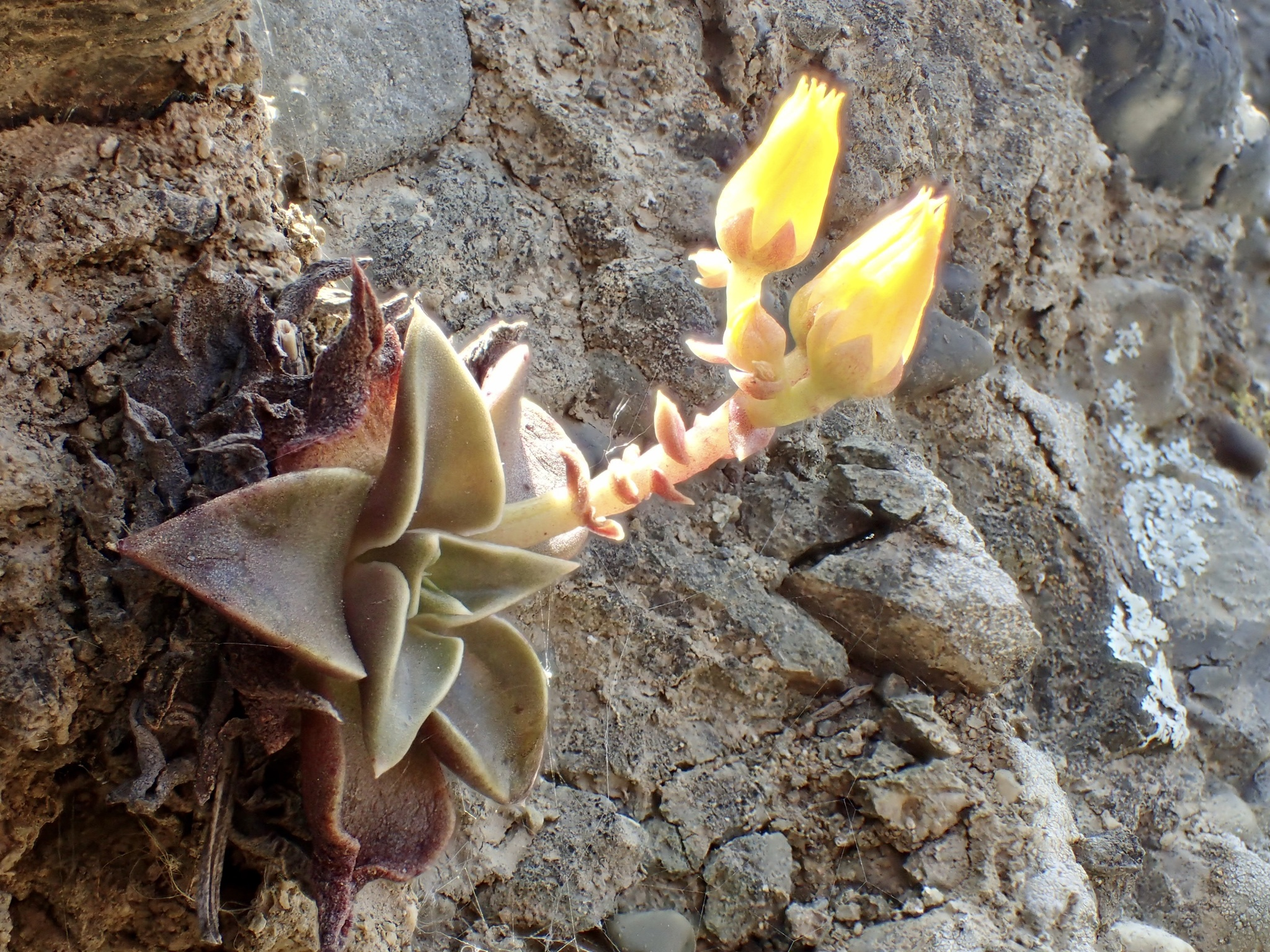

Conservation status
- Critically Imperiled (NatureServe)

Scientific classification
- Kingdom: Plantae
- Clade: Embryophytes
- Clade: Tracheophytes
- Clade: Spermatophytes
- Clade: Angiosperms
- Clade: Eudicots
- Order: Saxifragales
- Family: Crassulaceae
- Genus: Dudleya
- Species: D. chasmophyta

Binomial name
- Dudleya chasmophyta S.McCabe sp. nov.

= Dudleya chasmophyta =

Species of flowering plant

Dudleya chasmophyta, commonly known as the Santiago Canyon liveforever or the crevice live-forever, is a rare succulent endemic to Orange County, California. It is known from a single population occupying a steep cliff band. When first classified this population was originally lumped with Dudleya cymosa ssp. ovatifolia, but genomic testing led to Dudleya chasmophyta's confirmation as a separate species in 2024. It has yellow flowers and blooms late spring - early summer.
