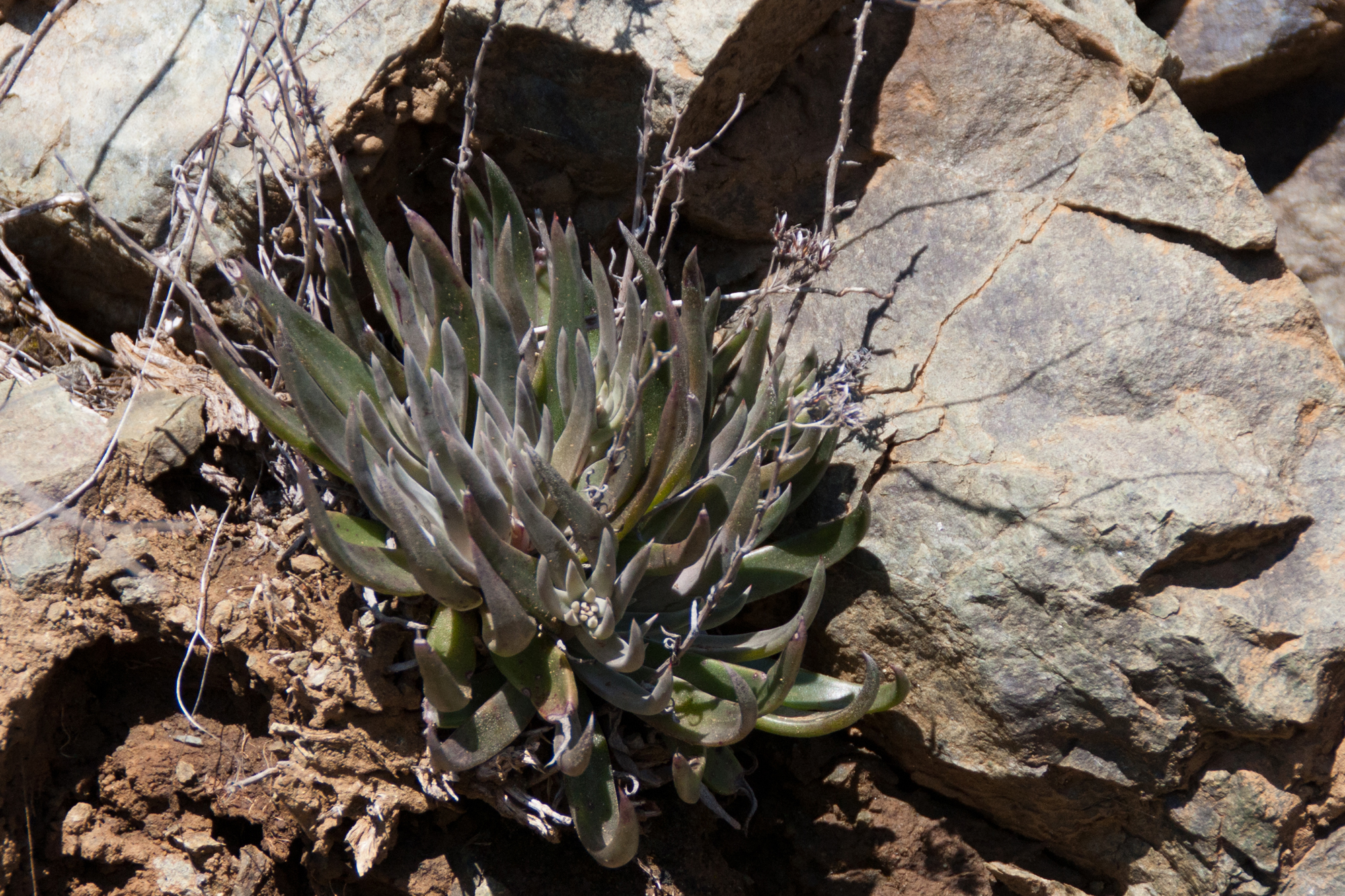

Conservation status
- Endangered (ESA)

Scientific classification
- Kingdom: Plantae
- Clade: Embryophytes
- Clade: Tracheophytes
- Clade: Spermatophytes
- Clade: Angiosperms
- Clade: Eudicots
- Order: Saxifragales
- Family: Crassulaceae
- Genus: Dudleya
- Species: D. abramsii
- Subspecies: D. a. subsp. setchellii

Trinomial name
- Dudleya abramsii subsp. setchellii (Jeps.) Moran

Synonyms
- Cotyledon laxa var. setchellii Jeps. (1901); Dudleya setchellii (Jeps.) Britton & Rose (1903); Cotyledon setchellii (Jeps.) Fedde (1904); Echeveria setchellii (Jeps.) Nelson & Macbride (1913); Echeveria laxa var. setchellii (Jeps.) Jepson (1936); Dudleya cymosa ssp. setchellii (Jeps.) Moran (1957)

= Dudleya abramsii subsp. setchellii =

Species of succulent

Dudleya abramsii subsp. setchellii, known by common name as the Santa Clara Valley dudleya or Santa Clara Valley liveforever, is a member of the Dudleya genus of succulent perennials, members of the family Crassulaceae. The Santa Clara Valley dudleya, endemic to the Santa Clara Valley region in the southern San Francisco Bay Area, was listed on 3 February 1995, as an endangered species. It is considered to be a subspecies of Dudleya abramsii, but its taxonomic status is still unclear. Its closest relative is Dudleya cymosa subsp. paniculata, which is a morphologically similar sister taxon.

== Description ==
A perennial rosette-forming succulent, this species is characterized by pale yellow petals, a simple (not branching multiple times) inflorescence, and a restriction to serpentine soil.

=== Morphology ===
This rosettes are anywhere from 2–9 cm (0.79–3.54 in) wide, on top of stems (also referred to as caudices) that are 10–20 mm (0.39–0.79 in) wide. The stems may branch dichotomously to form 1 to 5 rosettes. The leaves are shaped oblong-triangular to lance-elliptic to lanceolate, and have a glaucous surface. The leaves measure 3–8 cm (1.2–3.1 in) long by 7–15 mm (0.28–0.59 in) wide.

The peduncle is 5–20 cm (2.0–7.9 in) tall and 2–4 mm (0.079–0.157 in) wide. The lower bracts on the peduncle measure 10–25 mm (0.39–0.98 in) long. There are typically 2 to 3 first degree branches on the inflorescence, which are oriented in an ascending fashion and usually do not bifurcate further. On the branches are pedicels, measuring 2–7 mm (0.079–0.276 in) in length, holding the flowers. The flowers have sepals that are 2–5 mm (0.079–0.197 in) long, and shaped deltate. The petals are 8–13 mm (0.31–0.51 in) long by 2.5–3.5 mm (0.098–0.138 in) wide, and shaped elliptic, with their tips acute. The lower parts of the petals are fused 1–2.5 mm (0.039–0.098 in) the way up to form a tube. The petals are colored a pale yellow.

== Taxonomy ==
Cladogram of Dudleya setchellii

- Virens clade
  - - D. abramsii subsp. setchellii
    - D. cymosa subsp. paniculata
  - D. cymosa subsp. cymosa

Dudleya abramsii subsp. setchellii has undergone numerous changes in its taxonomic classification. Originally placed a subspecies of Cotyledon laxa / Echeveria laxa, an antiquated synonym for Dudleya caespitosa, botanists Nathaniel Lord Britton and Joseph Nelson Rose placed it as a separate species within Dudleya in 1903. In a 1957 issue of Madroño, botanist Reid Moran revised setchellii as a subspecies of Dudleya cymosa. Cotyledon caespitosa var. paniculata, now Dudleya cymosa subsp. paniculata, was merged into setchellii. Almost half a century later, Moran and other botanists returned to setchellii, and again revised it as a subspecies of Dudleya abramsii.

It is visually similar to and sometimes indistinguishable from Dudleya cymosa subsp. paniculata. Recent phylogenetic analysis may in fact place setchellii back into a subspecies of D. cymosa, as it is most closely related to D. c. subsp. paniculata. Reid Moran, who combined it back into D. abramsii, suggests that it owes a superficial resemblance to Dudleya abramsii subsp. murina.

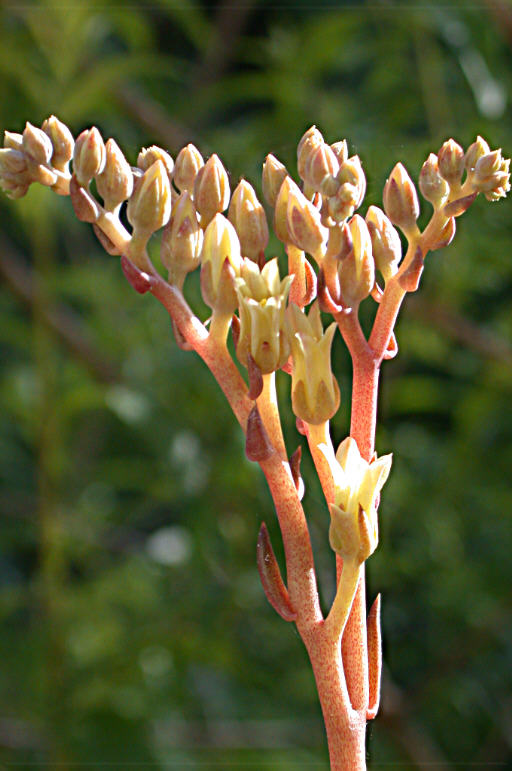
The inflorescence and flowers

== Distribution ==
Dudleya abramsii subsp. setchellii is found only in the Coyote Valley area of southern Santa Clara County, California, mostly on rocky outcrops within serpentine grasslands on Tulare Hill and the Santa Teresa Hills west of Coyote Creek in south San Jose and south of Metcalf Canyon east of Coyote Creek.

== Gallery ==
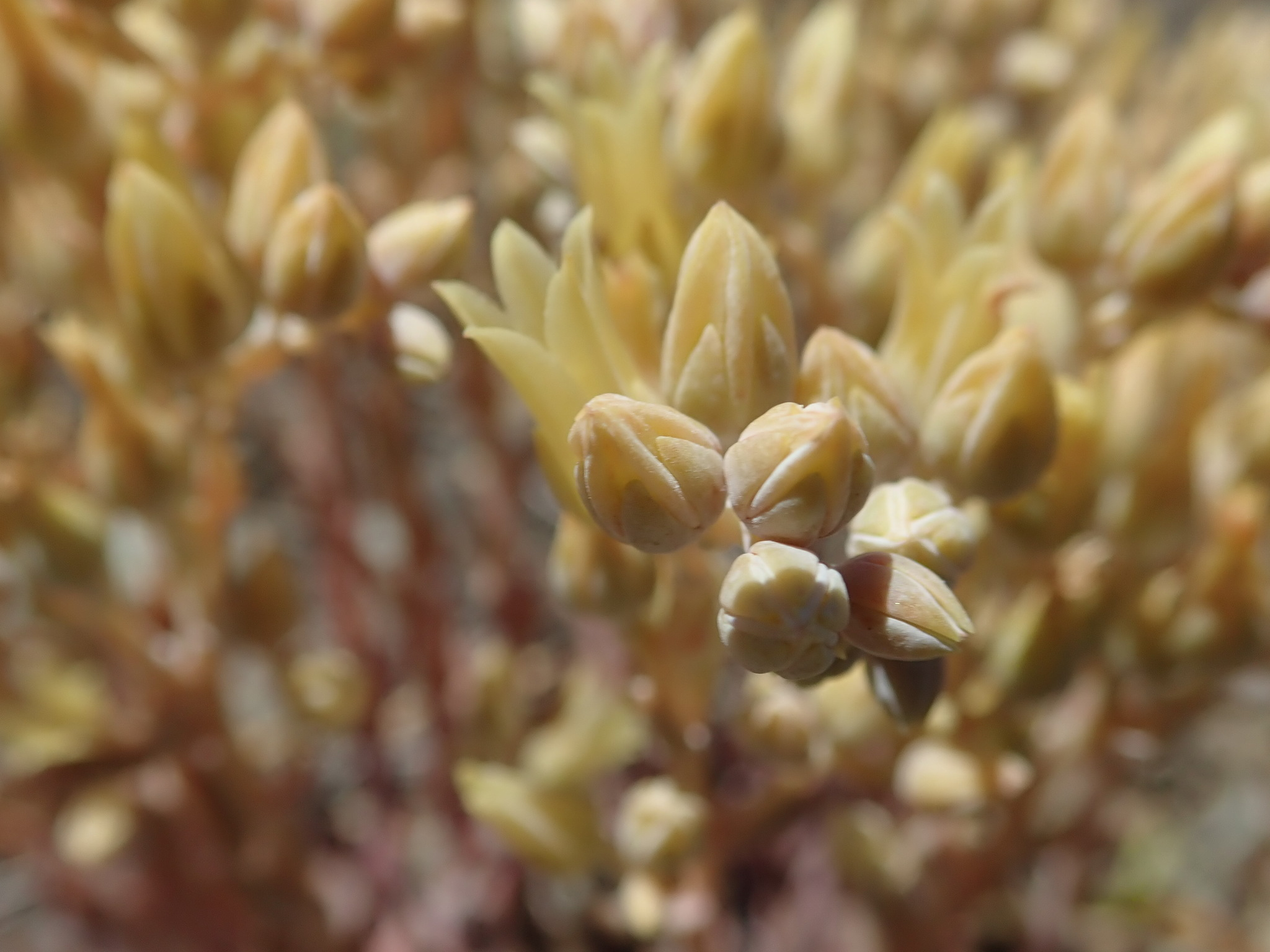
Detail of the flowers and inflorescence in bloom

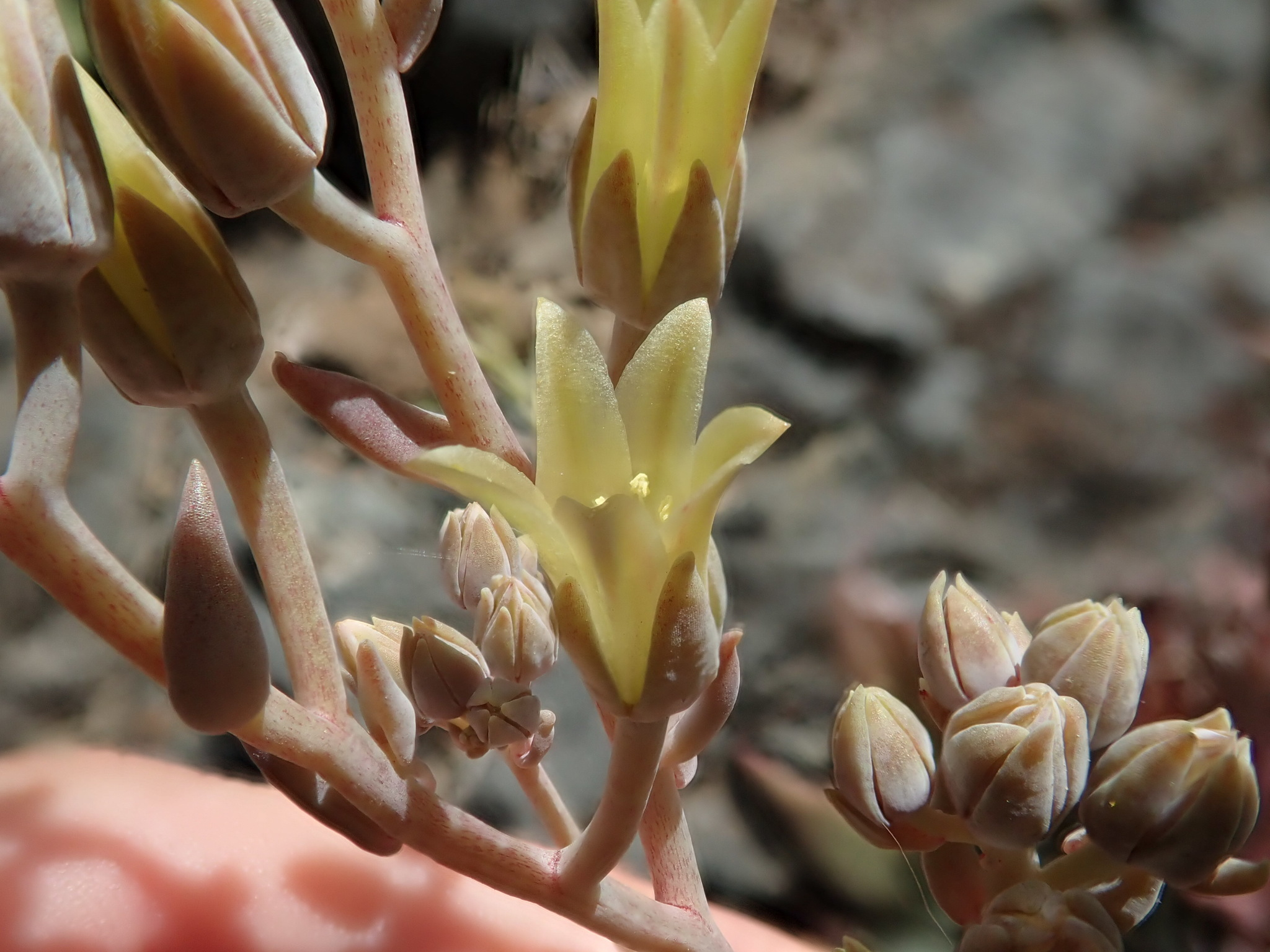
Detail of the flowers and inflorescence in bloom

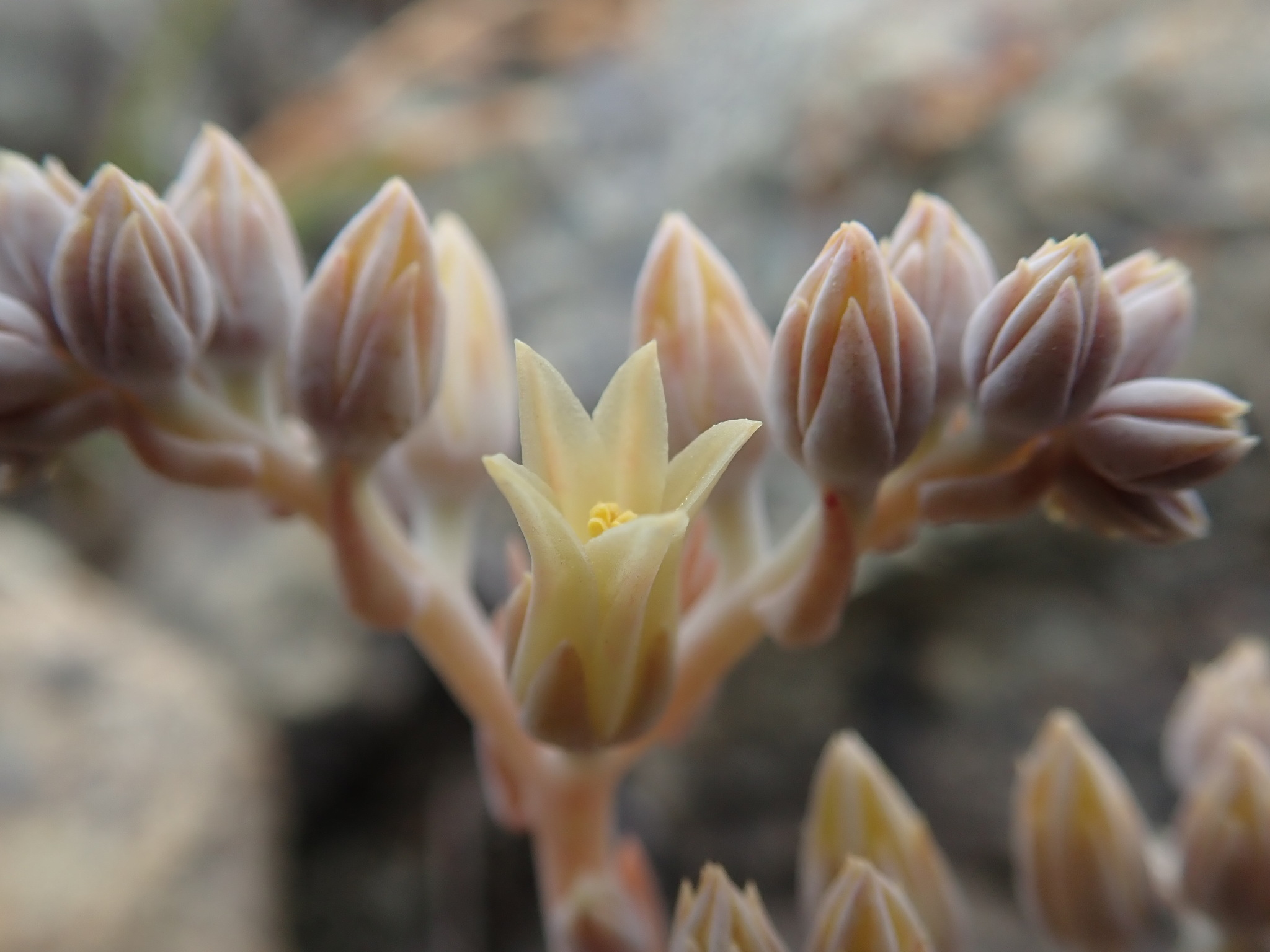
Detail of the flowers and inflorescence in bloom

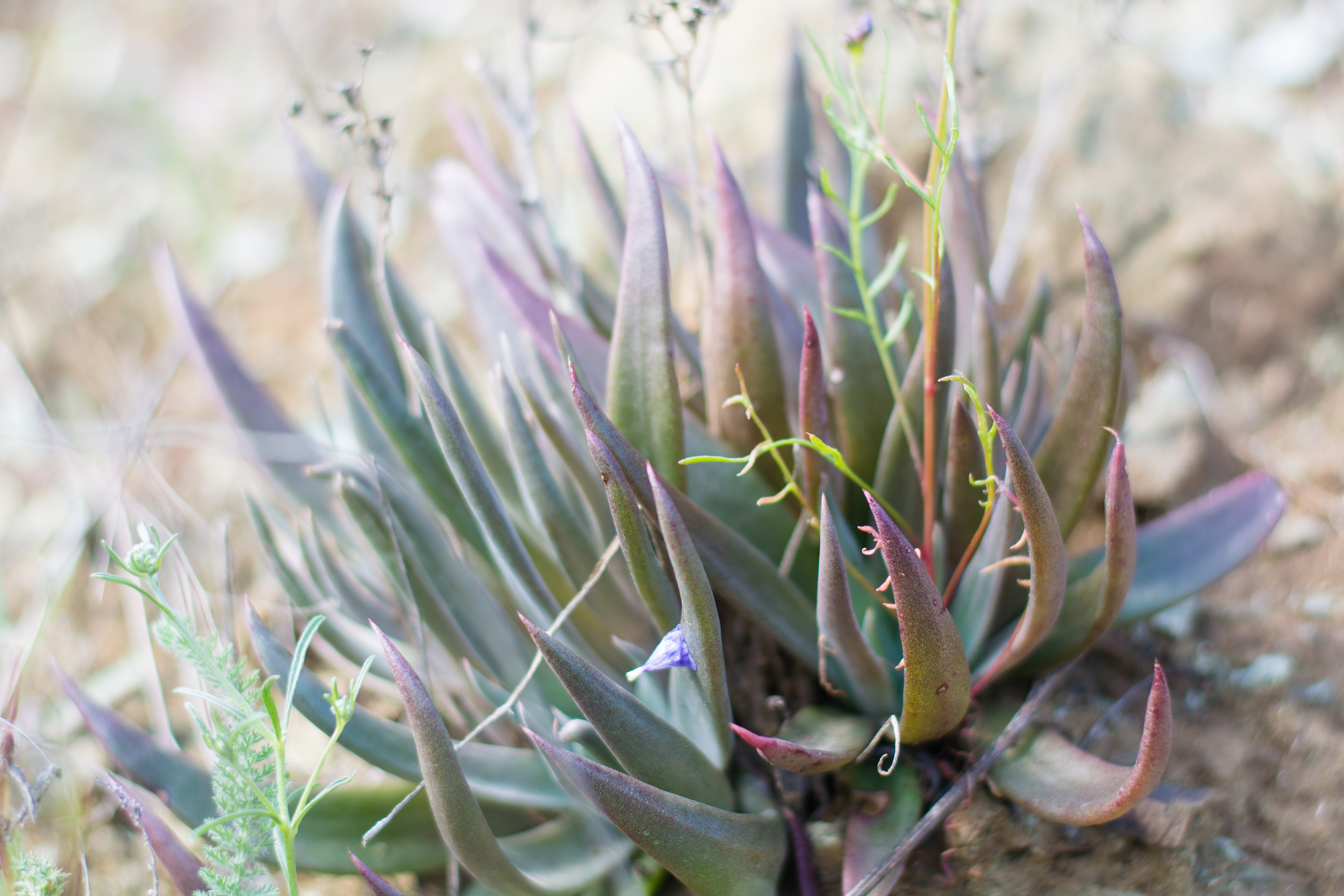
Growing in habitat

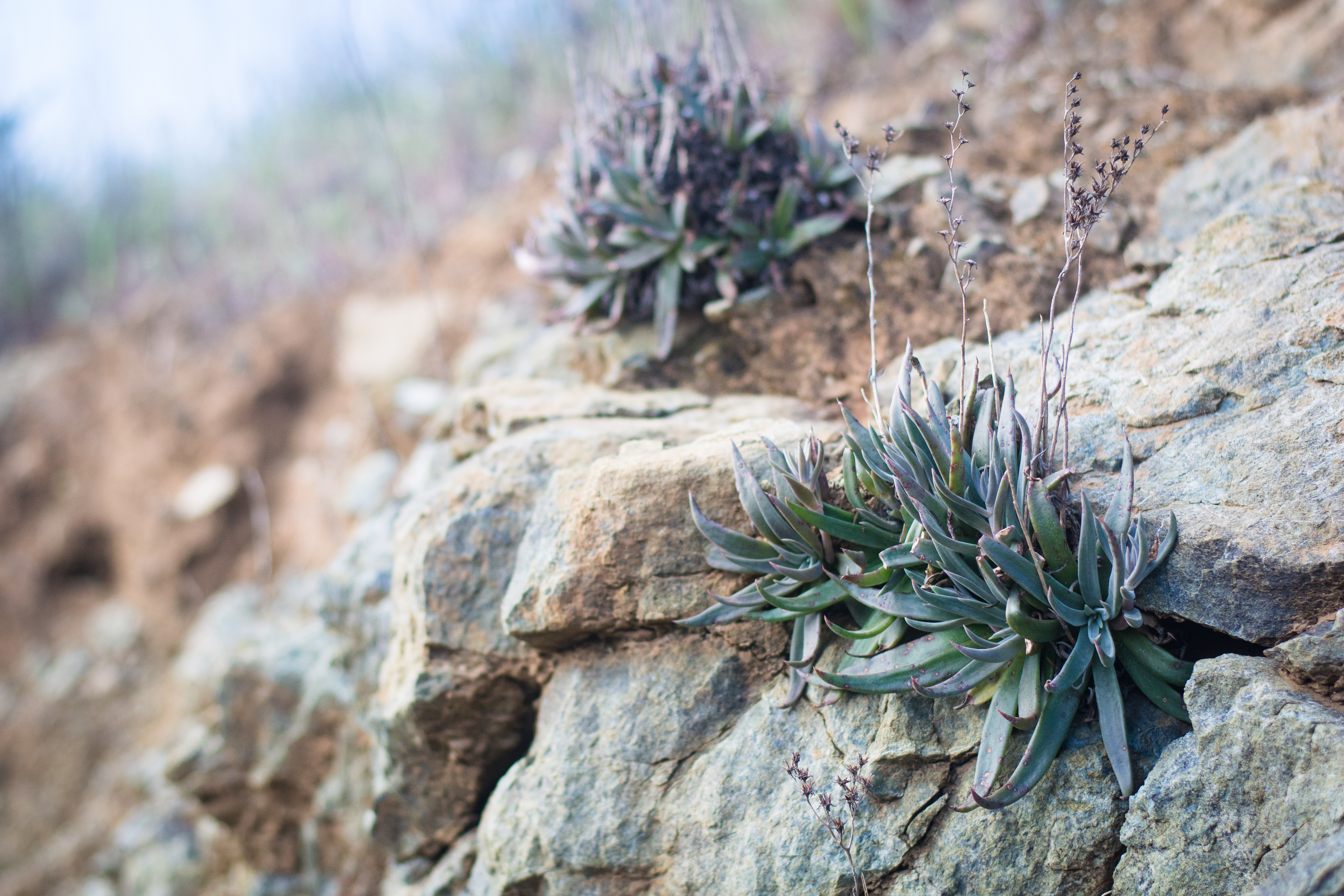
Plants in habitat

== See also ==
- Dudleya cymosa subsp. paniculata
- Dudleya abramsii subsp. abramsii
- Dudleya farinosa
