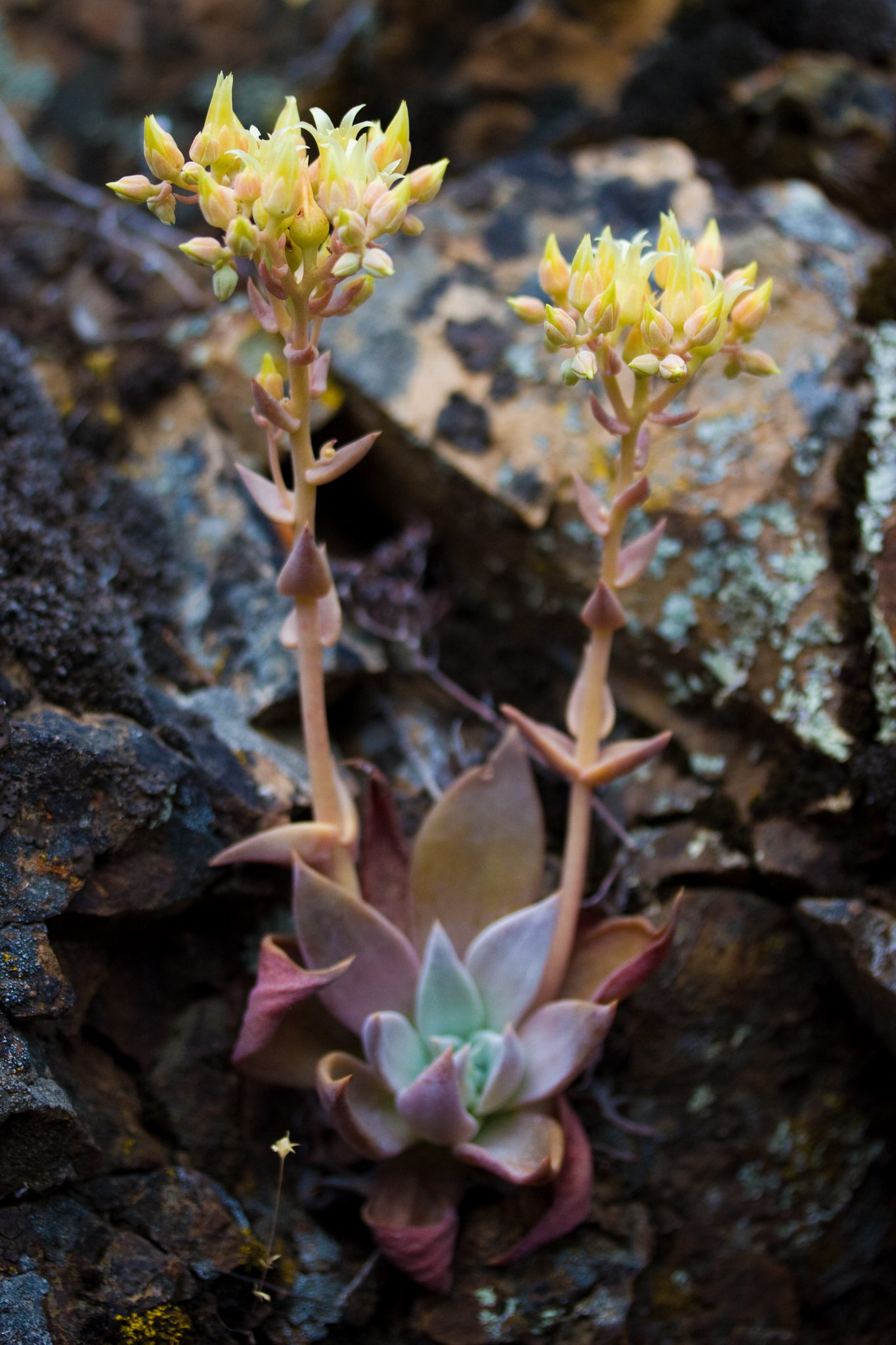

Conservation status
- Apparently Secure (NatureServe)

Scientific classification
- Kingdom: Plantae
- Clade: Embryophytes
- Clade: Tracheophytes
- Clade: Spermatophytes
- Clade: Angiosperms
- Clade: Eudicots
- Order: Saxifragales
- Family: Crassulaceae
- Genus: Dudleya
- Species: D. cymosa
- Subspecies: D. c. subsp. paniculata

Trinomial name
- Dudleya cymosa subsp. paniculata (Jeps.) K.M.Nakai

Synonyms
- Cotyledon caespitosa var. paniculata Jeps.; Dudleya humilis Britton & Rose; Dudleya paniculata Britton & Rose

= Dudleya cymosa subsp. paniculata =

Species of succulent plant

Dudleya cymosa subsp. paniculata, known by the common name Diablo Range dudleya, is a species of perennial succulent plant in the family Crassulaceae native to the Inner South Coast Range of California. It is characterized by pale yellowish flowers, oblong to oblanceolate leaves and a growth habit not limited to a single substrate. It is closely related to Dudleya abramsii subsp. setchellii.

== Description ==
This plant is not usually caespitose, rosettes are solitary to few. The rosettes are 4 to 11 cm wide. The stems are 1 to 2 cm wide. The leaves are 3 to 10 cm, 5 to 20 mm wide, shaped oblong, oblanceolate to lance-oblong, green to more or less white, and the foliage may or may not be glaucous, leaf tip acute. The peduncle is 5 to 25 cm long, and the inflorescence contains 2 to 3 branches that rebranch once or twice. The terminal branches are 1 to 5 cm long, with 4 to 10 flowers, on pedicels 3 to 12 mm long. The petals are 1.5 to 2.5 mm wide, colored a pale yellow to white-yellow, or pale-yellow pink in the San Joaquin Valley.

Flowering is from May to June.

== Taxonomy ==
=== Taxonomic history ===
This plant was first described as Cotyledon caespitosa var. paniculata by Jepson in 1901. In Nathaniel Lord Britton and Joseph Nelson Rose's reorganization of North American Crassulaceae in 1903, they described this plant as Dudleya paniculata and Dudleya humilis. In the 1950s, Reid Moran regarded Cotyledon caespitosa var. paniculata as a synonym of Dudleya cymosa subsp. setchellii, although he noted that they could be separated on the basis of leaf shape. Botanist Kei M. Nakai later again separated paniculata as Dudleya cymosa subsp. paniculata, and reduced Dudleya humilis as a synonym for subsp. paniculata plants that have become edaphic dwarfs.

Cladogram of Dudleya cymosa subsp. paniculata

- Virens clade
  - - D. abramsii subsp. setchellii
    - D. cymosa subsp. paniculata
  - D. cymosa subsp. cymosa

=== Characteristics ===
Dudleya cymosa subsp. paniculata can be differentiated from its close relative, Dudleya abramsii subsp. setchellii, in a number of ways. D. c. ssp. paniculata plants have oblong to oblanceolate rosette leaves rather than oblong-triangular leaves, an inflorescence of 2 to 3 branches that rebranch once or twice rather than an inflorescence of 2 to 3 branches that do not rebranch, and pedicels that are 6 to 12 mm long against pedicels that are 4 to 7 mm long. D. a. ssp. setchellii is also only restricted to serpentine rock outcrops, while this species occurs on a variety of substrates.

== Distribution and habitat ==
This species occurs throughout the Inner South Coast Ranges, the eastern San Francisco Bay Area, and mountainous portions of the San Joaquin Valley. It is particularly conspicuous on Mount Diablo and Mount Hamilton. It is found on rocky outcrops and in canyons.

== Gallery ==
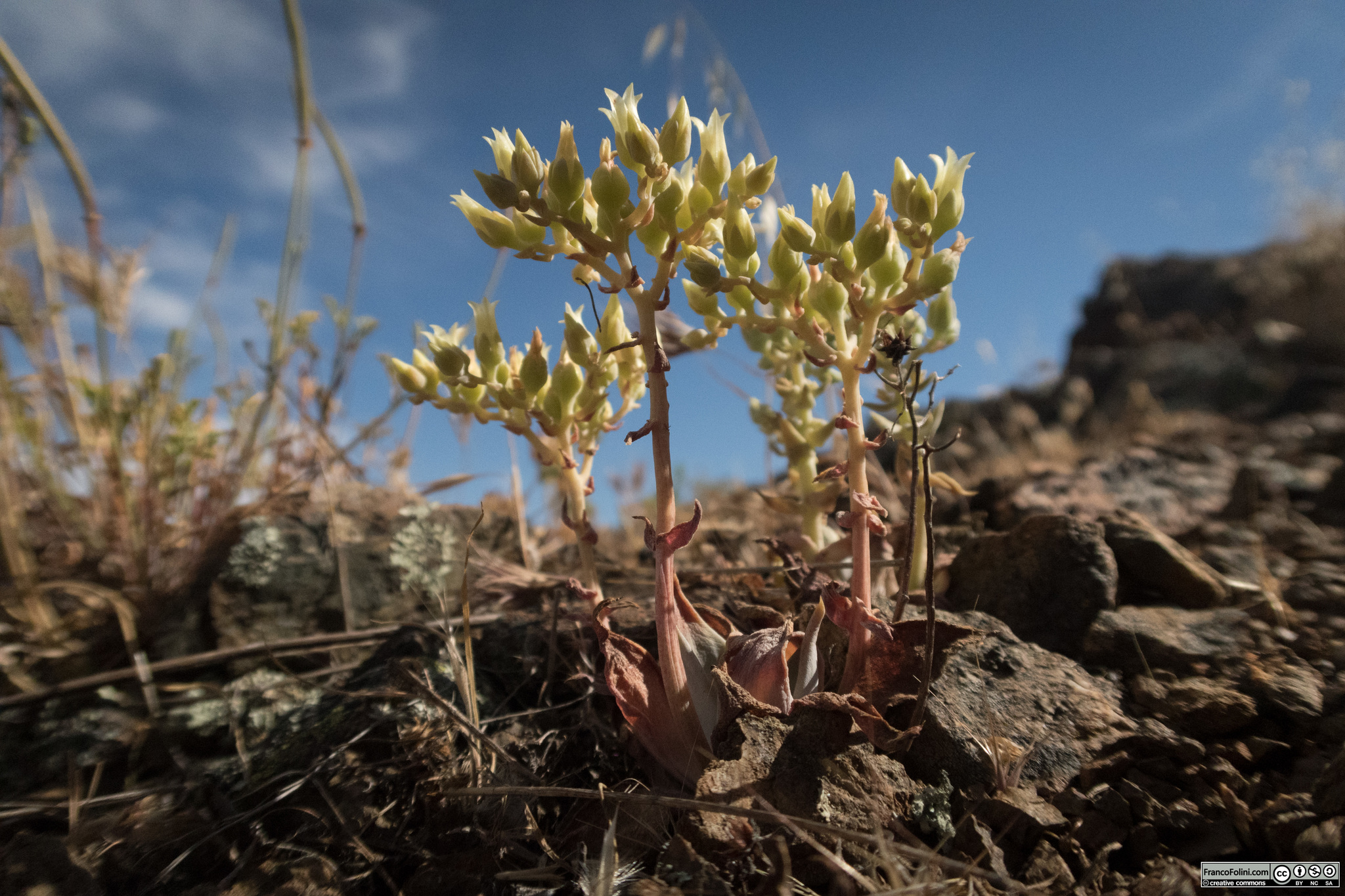
Flowering in habitat, Mount Diablo

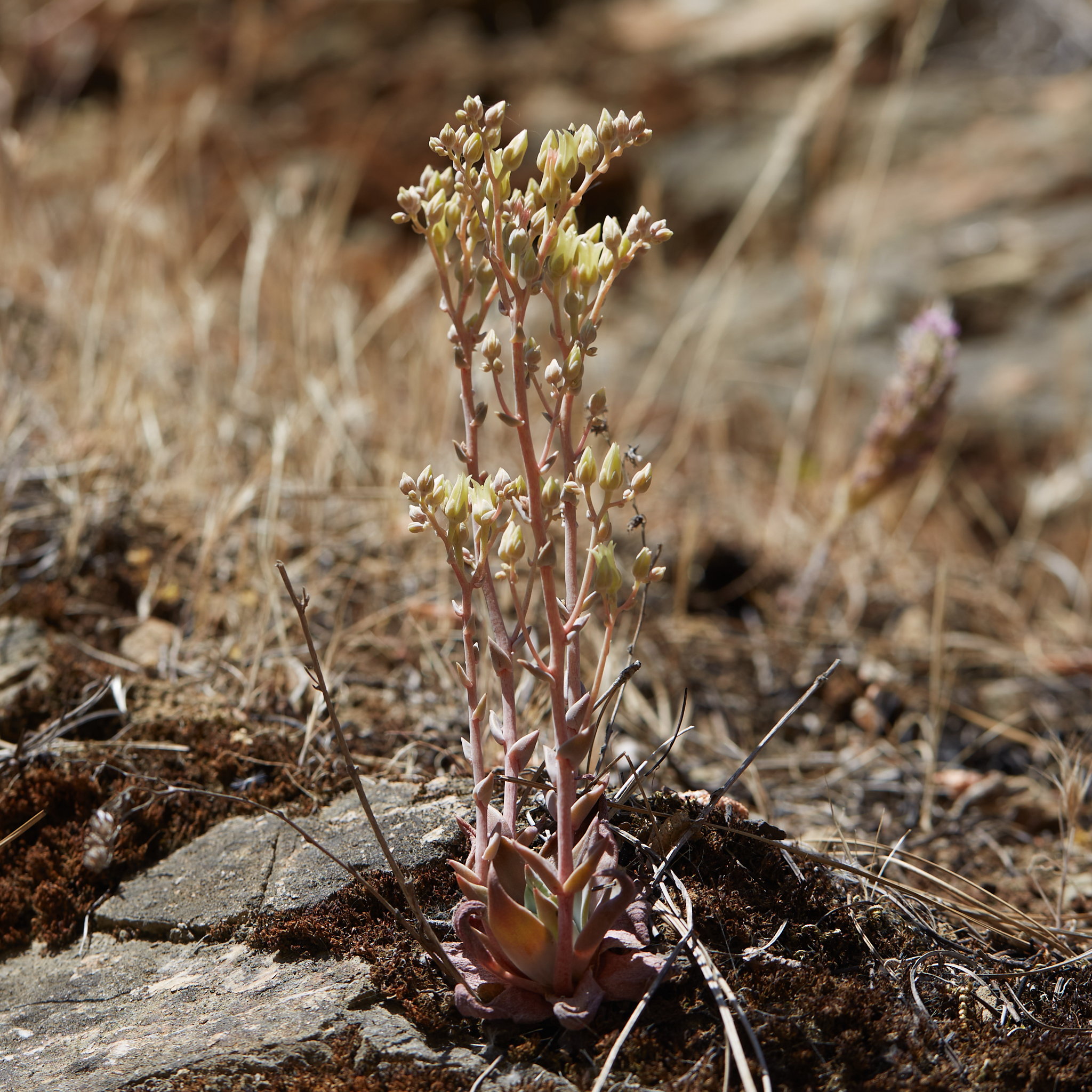
Flowering in habitat, Henry W. Coe State Park

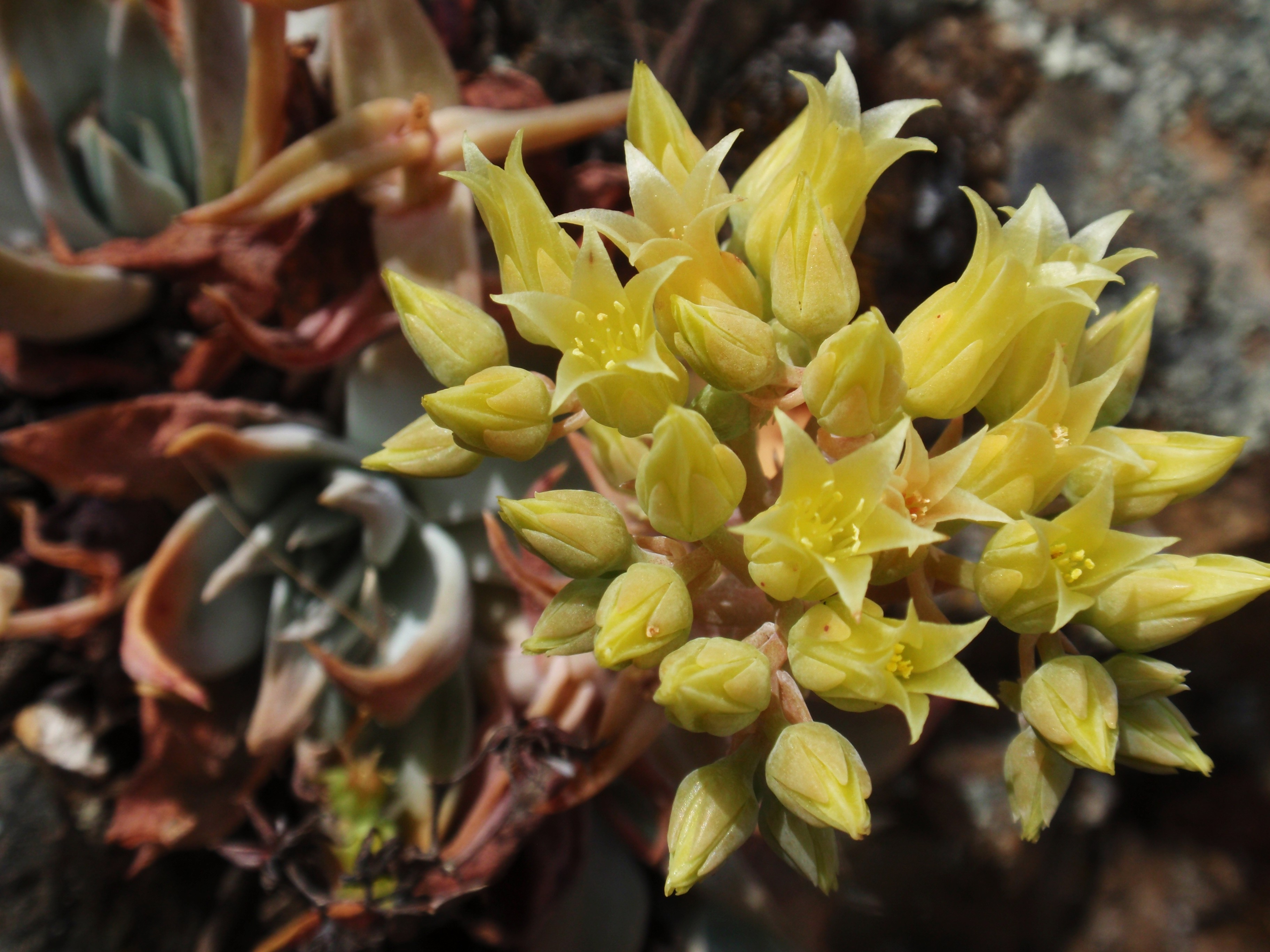
Flowering in habitat, Mount Diablo

== See also ==
- Dudleya abramsii subsp. setchellii
- Dudleya abramsii subsp. affinis
- Dudleya caespitosa
