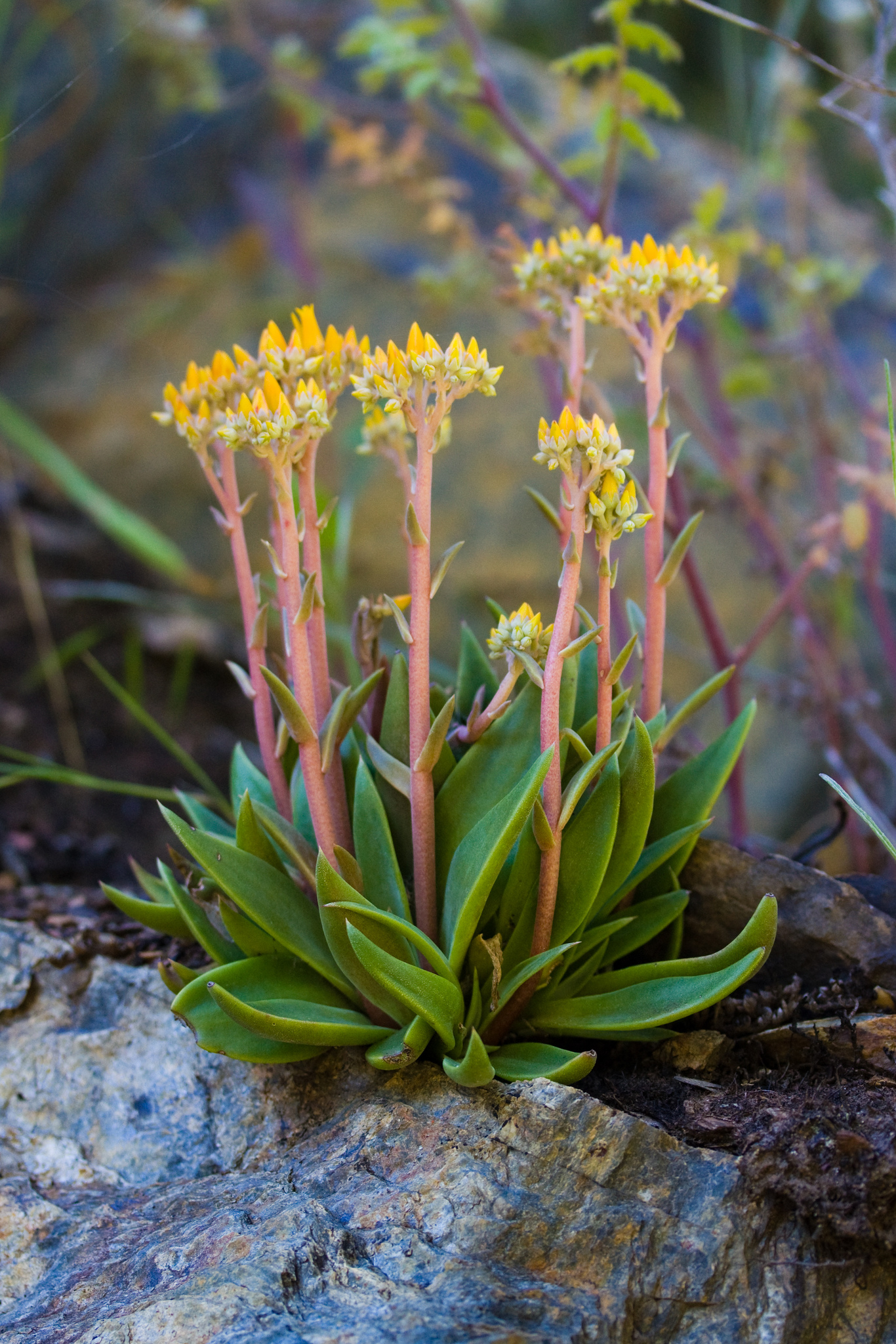

Scientific classification
- Kingdom: Plantae
- Clade: Embryophytes
- Clade: Tracheophytes
- Clade: Spermatophytes
- Clade: Angiosperms
- Clade: Eudicots
- Order: Saxifragales
- Family: Crassulaceae
- Genus: Dudleya
- Species: D. cymosa
- Subspecies: D. c. subsp. cymosa

Trinomial name
- Dudleya cymosa subsp. cymosa (Lemaire) Britton & Rose

Synonyms
- Dudleya angustiflora Rose; Dudleya laxa (Lindley) Britton & Rose; Dudleya nevadensis (S. Wats) Britton & Rose; Echeveria cymosa Lem.

= Dudleya cymosa subsp. cymosa =

Canyon liveforever

Subspecies of succulent perennial plant

Dudleya cymosa subsp. cymosa is a subspecies of succulent perennial plant in the family Crassulaceae endemic to California. It is the autonymous subspecies for Dudleya cymosa, and is known by the common name canyon liveforever. It is native to the California Coast Ranges, the Sierra Nevada and the Santa Monica Mountains. It is characterized by bright-yellow, orange or red flowers and broad, wide leaves. This plant is commonly found growing on rocky outcrops, talus slopes, and in shaded canyons.

== Description ==
A solitary or few-branched rosette forming succulent with broad leaves and bright-yellow, orange, or red flowers.

=== Vegetative morphology ===
Each basal rosette is formed on the apex of a stem, known as a caudex. The caudex is short, usually less than 5 cm long, and is 1 to 3.5 cm in diameter. It is typically unbranched, forming a solitary rosette, but may less commonly branch into a few rosettes. Each of the basal rosette is 6 to 20 cm in diameter, composed of 6 to 25 leaves. The leaves are typically 3 to 17 cm long, 10 to 60 mm wide, and 1 to 5 mm thick. The leaves are shaped ovate or deltate to oblanceolate or spatulate (shaped like a spoon). The margin (edge) of the leaves is often folded upward at the widest point, and the tip of the leaf is more or less recurved and is shaped acuminate to mucronate.

=== Reproductive morphology ===
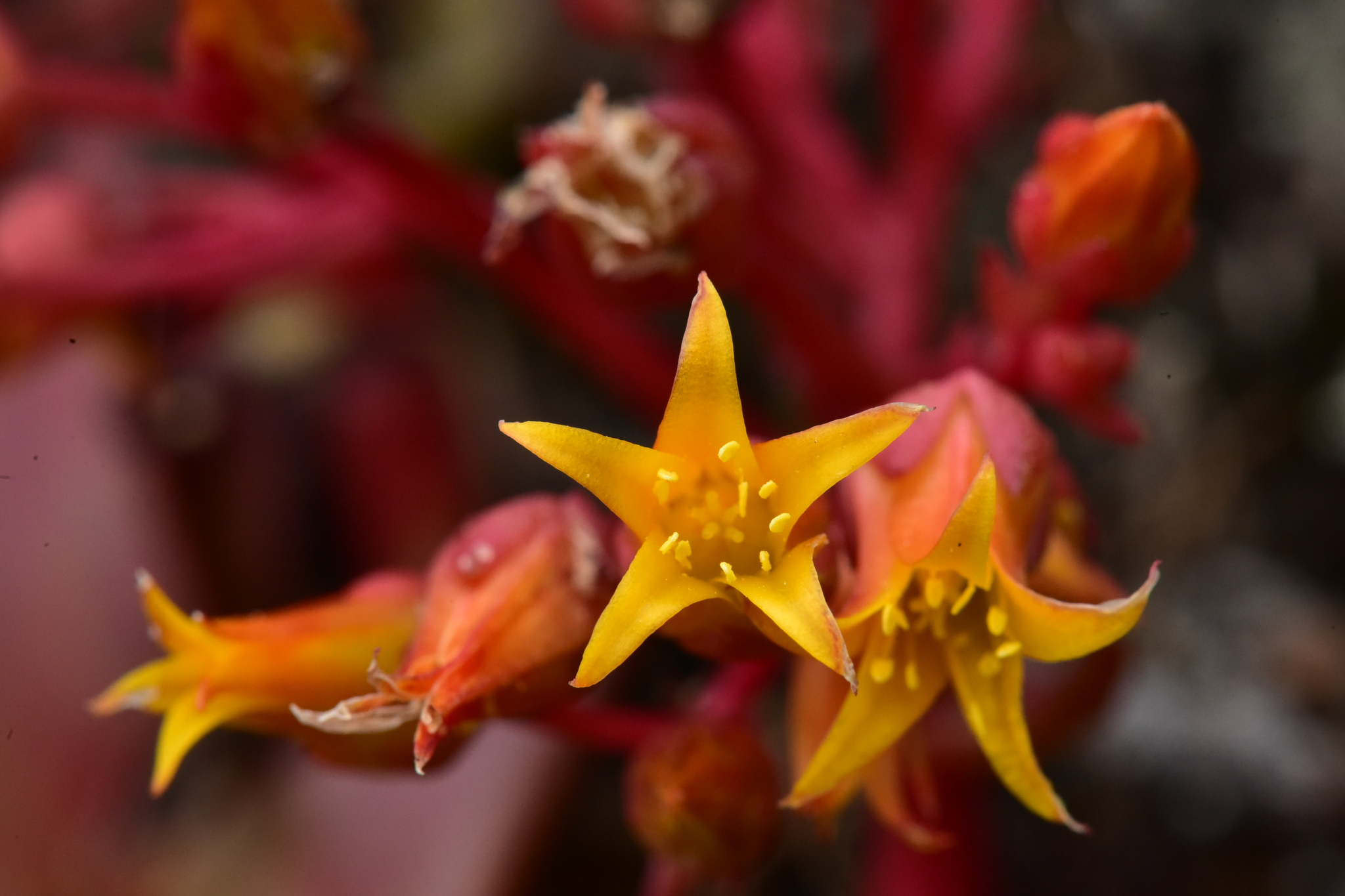
Detail of the flowers

The inflorescence is typically asymmetrical radially, because the pedicels turn to the sun or away from the cliff the plant is on. The peduncle (floral stem) is 5 to 45 cm tall, 2 to 8 mm wide, and ascending. On the inflorescence are 7 to 20 bracts, positioned horizontally to ascending, and shaped ovate to triangular-lanceolate, with the tips acute to acuminate. The lowermost bracts are 0.5 to 3 cm long and 5 to 15 mm wide. The inflorescence branches 2 to 4 times, and then may subsequently branch 0 to 3 times. The terminal branches are circinate when young (spiral-shaped, like a fern frond unfurling), but are ascending in age, 1 to 17 cm long and with 2 to 10 flowers. Suspending the flowers are the pedicels, which are erect, the lowermost 5 to 15 mm long.

The calyx of the flowers is 3 to 7 mm long, and 2.5 to 6 mm wide. The calyx lobes (equivalent to sepals) are triangular to triangular ovate, 1.5 to 5 mm long. The corolla is cylindrical in anthesis, with the tips of the petals spreading from 45 to 90 degree angles. The petals are colored yellow, orange, or red, and may be glaucous along their midrib. The petals are shaped elliptic to narrowly lanceolate, with an acute tip, 7 to 15 mm long and 2 to 4 mm wide, connate (fused to form a tube) 1 to 2.5 mm.

== Taxonomy ==
Cladogram of Dudleya cymosa subsp. cymosa

- Virens clade
  - - D. abramsii subsp. setchellii
    - D. cymosa subsp. paniculata
  - D. cymosa subsp. cymosa

=== Taxonomic history ===
The original description is from 1858 by Charles Antoine Lemaire, in the 10th issue of L'Illustration Horticole, as Echeveria cymosa. Lemaire's plants came from cultivated plants in Europe, with their original locality simply listed as "California". As there was no authentic type specimen, the neotype for the species is an illustration by John Gilbert Baker of his subsequent combination, Cotyledon cymosa, in William Saunder's Refugio Botanicum.

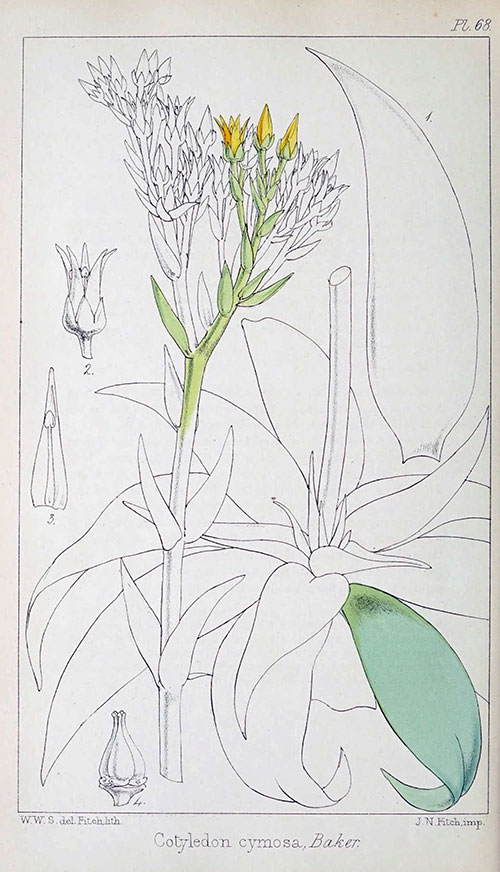
The illustration by John Gilbert Baker which defines the species Dudleya cymosa.

In their work on North American Crassulaceae, Nathaniel Lord Britton and Joseph Nelson Rose described the genus Dudleya and moved a number of species into the new genus, creating Dudleya cymosa. With the recognition of other infraspecific taxa, the autonym Dudleya cymosa subsp. cymosa was created. Reid Moran in the 1950s recognized a larger subspecies of Dudleya cymosa known as subsp. gigantea based on its larger size, but additional data proved this subspecies invalid, as the supposed larger size was not evident after numerous collections and data from cultivation, and it was synonymized back to D. c. cymosa.

=== Phylogenetics ===
Plants of this subspecies are typically diploid, with a chromosome number of n = 17, the base number for Dudleya. Phylogenetic analysis has placed this plant with the closely related to Dudleya cymosa subsp. paniculata and Dudleya abramsii subsp. setchellii. The other subspecies of Dudleya cymosa may not be closely related.

== Distribution and habitat ==
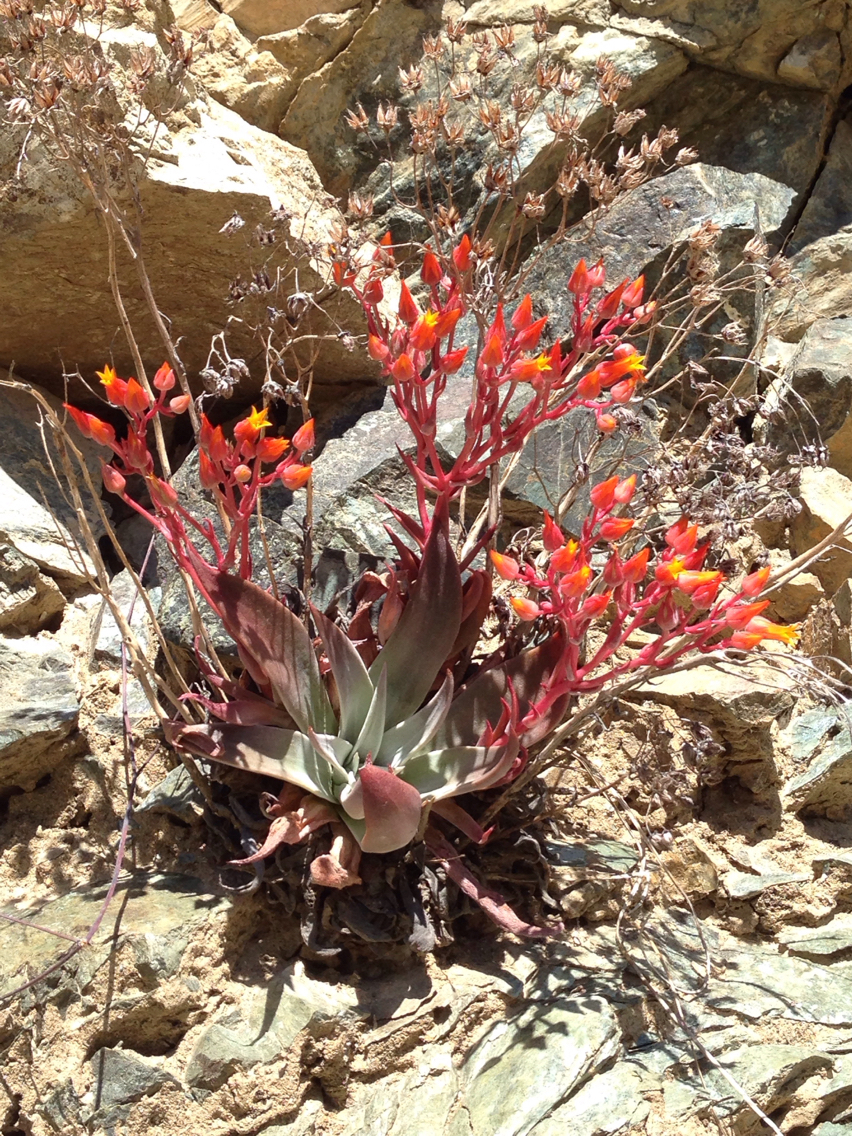
In habitat

This species is endemic to California. It is distributed throughout the California Coast Ranges, reaching a northern extent in Humboldt County, and is also found throughout the Sierra Nevada, and more rarely in the Santa Monica Mountains of Southern California. It is found in rocky outcroppings, talus slopes, and shaded canyon slopes.
