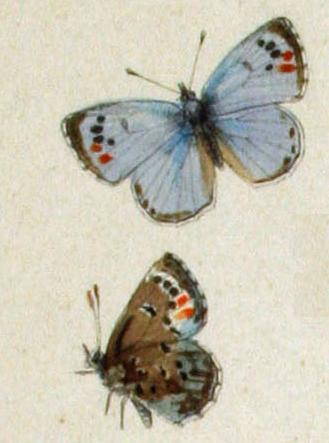

Scientific classification
- Kingdom: Animalia
- Phylum: Arthropoda
- Clade: Pancrustacea
- Class: Insecta
- Order: Lepidoptera
- Family: Lycaenidae
- Genus: Philotes; Scudder, 1876
- Species: P. sonorensis

Binomial name
- Philotes sonorensis (C. & R. Felder, [1865])

Synonyms
- Lycaena sonorensis C. & R. Felder, [1865]; Lycaena regia Boisduval, 1869; Philotes sonorensis ab. sonoralba Watson & Comstock, 1920; Philotes sonorensis f. comstocki Gunder, 1925

= Philotes sonorensis =

Species of butterfly

Philotes is a genus of butterflies in the family Lycaenidae. Philotes is a monotypic genus containing only Philotes sonorensis, the Sonoran blue or stonecrop blue, found in North America in California and Baja California.

Their habitat consists of rocky washes, outcrops, and cliffs in deserts. These habitats are associated with succulent host plants of the genus Dudleya (of the family Crassulaceae).

The P. sonorensis larvae feed on Dudleya species, including D. cymosa, D. lanceolata and D. saxosa. They bore into the leaves of their host plant and after larval development, the chrysalids hibernate under stones.

The wingspan of an adult butterfly is 22–25 mm. Males are predominantly blue while females are darker with reduced blue scaling.

The adult butterflies that emerge after pupation exhibit site fidelity, meaning that they do not stray from their consistent habitat. This dependency on specialized environments has made Philotes sonorensis a topic of research pertaining to taxonomy, ecology, behavior, and conservation efforts. Molecular studies surrounding this species' classification and phylogeny have contributed to the understanding of its relationships within Lycaenidae. Records of isolated populations of P. sonorensis along with its extinct subspecies (Philotes sonorensis extincta) have also shed light on the difficulty in conserving these heavily specialized butterflies.

== Taxonomy ==
=== Subspecies ===
- Philotes sonorensis sonorensis. Most often found in California and Baja California.
- †Philotes sonorensis extincta Mattoni, 1989 (upper San Gabriel river wash in southern California). This population was geographically restricted to the San Gabriel Mountains, and was sampled annually for three decades leading to its disappearance in 1970. It was recognized nearly two decades later as a subspecies. P. sonorensis extincta was also labeled as a conservation concern and as an example of the extreme vulnerability that comes from being a specialized species.

=== Historical classification ===
In 1865, Austrian entomologists Cejetan and Rudolf Felder were the first to recognize P. sonorensis as the type species for Philotes, meaning that it acts as the representative species for the genus Philotes. The classification of North American members of this genus was a topic of conversation throughout the 20th century, and researchers continued documenting Philotes characteristics and the relationships between its different members. A synonymic review, which is an exploratory study on these varying populations, was released to emphasize their nomenclature and individual classification. Many members of this genus reside in localized environments, which sparked interest pertaining to their variation patterns as a result of their uneven distribution of habitats.

=== Molecular phylogeny ===
Morphology alone made it challenging to confirm taxonomic theories regarding Philotes and related genera. In recent decades, molecular studies have been conducted to provide more insight into the evolutionary placement of Philotes sonorensis within Lycaenidae. A 2011 phylogenetic analysis of the Glaucopsyche genus (of the family Lycaenidae) used mitochondrial and nuclear DNA markers and identified a clade containing Philotes sonorensis and Scolitantides orion as the closest relatives. A 2018 study reconstructing a tree for the genus Pseudophilotes confirmed Philotes sonorensis and Scolitantides orion as sister taxa noting that both species utilize host plants within Crassulaceae as their larval food-plant, unlike other closely related lycaenid butterflies. As a result, P. sonorensis has played a role in the classification of North American lycaenid butterflies and has provided additional evidence for relationships in general amongst blue butterflies.

== Description ==
=== Adult morphology and variation ===
Adults are small lycaenid butterflies with a wingspan of 22-25 mm. Males are iridescent blue on upper wing surfaces while females are darker and exhibit reduced blue scaling. Both males and females have orange and black markings, which separates P. sonorensis from other blue butterflies found in North America. These markings can be of various size and intensity as a result of different populations. Some southern California populations have reported to being larger and more boldly marked than those from central California.

== Distribution and habitat ==
=== Geographic distribution ===
Many populations of Philotes sonorensis have been documented throughout California and Baja California, showing that the butterflies are restricted to habitat areas deemed suitable for their needs. In California, this species has been recorded in Los Angeles, Orange, San Diego, Santa Barbara, and other counties meeting their habitat requirements. In Baja California, P. sonorensis has been documented along the Sierra Juárez mountain range.

=== Habitat ===
The species typically favors arid habitats that contain their succulent host plants. These habitats usually contain the environmental characteristics of rocky canyons, washes, cliffs, and outcrops that contribute to the growth of Dudleya. More records of this butterfly suggest that their populations are found from coastal ecosystems to mountainous areas with some populations residing in serpentine environments. Dudleya host plants are typically unevenly distributed, which results in the isolation of varying populations of Philotes sonorensis.

== Ecology ==
=== Host plants ===
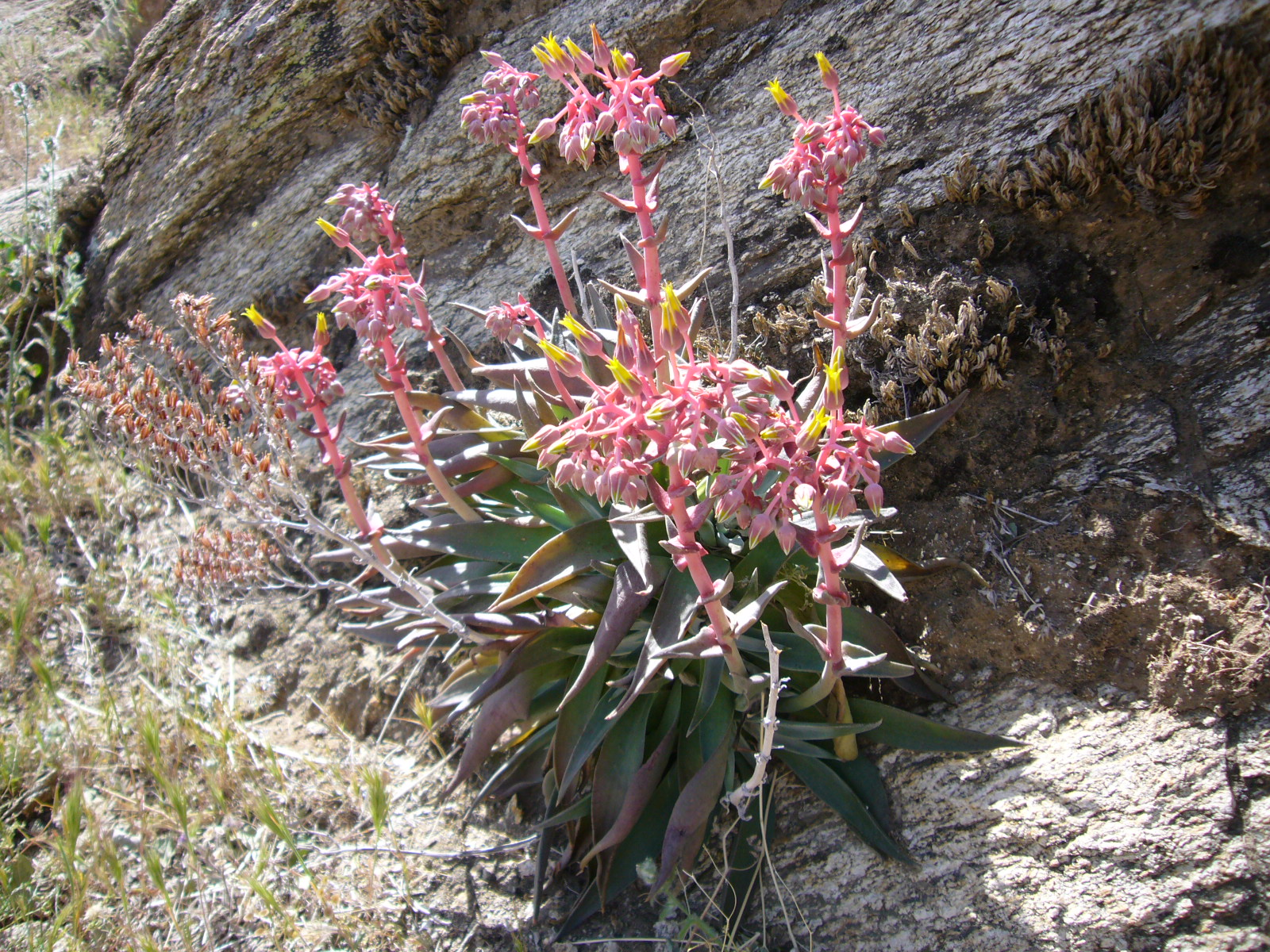
One of the host plants of Philotes sonorensis, Dudleya saxosa, in California.

Philotes sonorensis ecology is aligned with succulent plant growth of the genus Dudleya. Its larvae use varying host species within the genus, such as D. cymosa, D. lanceolata and D. saxosa. The relationship between these butterflies and their host plants causes high dependency, leading to geographic isolation of populations from each other. Environments that do not contain Dudleya communities typically cannot sustain P. sonorensis.

=== Larval development and pupation ===
Larvae utilize a specialized feeding strategy that targets the internal leaves of Dudleya, which benefits the larvae in protection from predators. After females lay eggs on these host plants, larvae fully develop within the leaf tissues before pupating in other protected regions, such as on the bottom of their host plants' dead leaves or under stones within their habitat. Pupae stay dormant until late winter and spring (February through June) when the environment becomes ideal for adult emergence, which also happens to be associated with the growth period of their host plants.

=== Adult phenology ===
Coinciding with the emergence period from their pupae, adults have been recorded to be flying as early as February. The timeline of their emergence is affected by seasonal conditions, such as temperature, humidity, and precipitation. Similar to the geographic variation in their wing attributes, flight periods do vary by geographic location, specifically elevation. Populations residing in lower-elevation areas emerge earlier than those that remain in higher-elevation regions.

== Behavior ==
=== Site fidelity and movement ecology ===
An experiment took place in the San Gabriel Canyon of southern California to investigate movement behavior of Philotes sonorensis. The species was captured and marked to determine whether they would return to the original capture locations or randomly disperse. Butterflies that were removed from close habitats did return to the site of their capture at greater rates than hypothesized. It was suggested that Philotes sonorensis is a more sedentary species that behaves in correlation to local habitat characteristics (site fidelity).

=== Adult behavior ===
In search of females, adult males of P. sonorensis linger around host plant communities. They remain close to the plants rather than covering a wide range of habitat, and can be seen flying from cliffs before returning to their perches above the habitat. This behavior has been associated with marking territory and making their location known to other males. Females remain in close proximity to host plants for oviposition.

== Evolution and phylogeny ==
=== Host-plant specialization ===
Host-plant specialization is a suggested reason for diversification among lycaenid butterflies related to Philotes, specifically pertaining to ecological adaptation and host shifts. These interactions between Philotes sonorensis and Dudleya demonstrate a fairly narrow ecological niche, meaning that this butterfly species uses only specific species of Dudleya (D. cymosa, D. lanceolata, D. saxosa). In order for the successful reproduction of P. sonorensis, suitable communities of these host plants must remain in abundance due to this degree of specialization.

=== Evolutionary relationships ===
The genus Philotes is monotypic, signifying that it only represents one existing species (Philotes sonorensis). This species is a member of Lycaenidae, specifically a part of the tribe Polyommatini. This tribe is known for its vibrant blue coloration and is often referred to as "typical blues." The classification of P. sonorensis was initially heavily influenced by morphology and geographic distribution, but recent studies have turned to more evidence on the molecular level. A study was completed using nuclear and mitochondrial DNA markers to determine a possible relationship between different species within Lycaenidae. The result led to a deeper understanding of where Philotes lies in the family Lycaenidae when concerned with evolution.

== Conservation ==
=== Habitat specialization ===
Philotes sonorensis, similar to lycaenid butterflies in general, are dependent on specialized ecological interactions (specifically to host plants) and habitats that are localized. Habitat disturbance has been documented for some southern California populations, so intentional focus on conserving areas where the Dudleya plant thrives is crucial.

=== Threats ===
Since this species is dependent on their host plants, any disturbance to the plants' native communities has the potential to negatively affect the populations of P. sonorensis. Many species of Dudleya are under threat due to illegal harvesting for the commercial succulent trade, eventually influencing the passage of California Assembly Bill 223 in 2021. This state law was endorsed by the California Native Plant Society, and imposes financial penalties associated with the poaching and sale of wild Dudleya plants. Moreover, urban development and recreational activities are additional ways that these habitats deemed 'suitable' for Philotes sonorensis butterflies have been reduced. Conservation efforts of these host plant communities would ensure long-term survival of this species.

=== Conservation significance ===
Philotes sonorensis exhibits strong habitat specialization and an unusual host plant specialization compared to other lycaenids. As the only member of its genus and an endemic to California and Baja California, the species is of special interest within Californian butterfly ecology. This species has the potential to serve as an ecological indicator for the environment its threatened hostplants inhabit. Its habitat is not uniformly distributed and the adults do not show a wide range of dispersal, which allows the entire lifecycle of these butterflies to be studied in hopes of improving lycaenid conservation.
