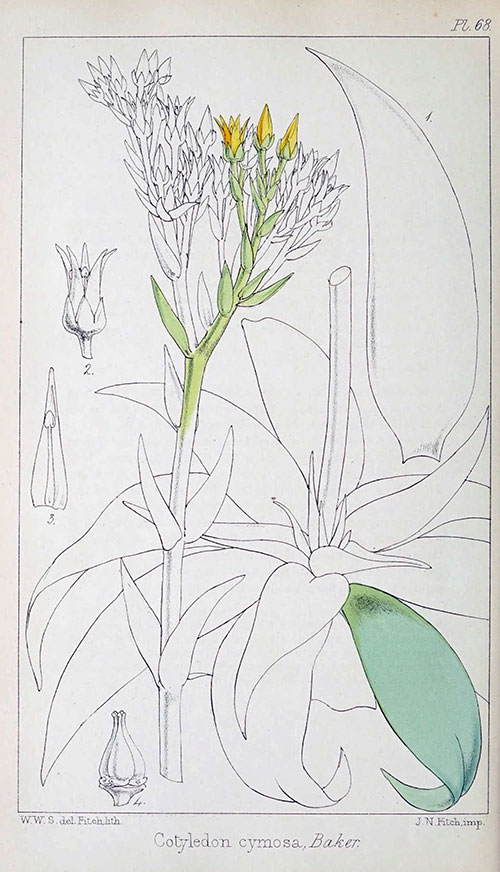
- The neotype for D. cymosa, an illustration by John Gilbert Baker

Conservation status
- Secure (NatureServe)

Scientific classification
- Kingdom: Plantae
- Clade: Embryophytes
- Clade: Tracheophytes
- Clade: Spermatophytes
- Clade: Angiosperms
- Clade: Eudicots
- Order: Saxifragales
- Family: Crassulaceae
- Genus: Dudleya
- Species: D. cymosa

Binomial name
- Dudleya cymosa (Lem.) Britton & Rose

Synonyms
- Echeveria cymosa

= Dudleya cymosa =

Species of succulent

Dudleya cymosa is a species complex of evergreen and deciduous succulent plants in the family Crassulaceae known by the common name: canyon liveforever. It is a loosely defined polyphyletic species with a diverse number of subspecies, varying highly in morphology, distribution, and habitat.

== Description ==
It is a distinctive plant sending up erect red-orange stems from a gray-green basal rosette. The small yellowish-red thimble-shaped flowers top the stems in a cyme inflorescence. Some subspecies are considered threatened locally.

=== Subspecies ===
Recognized Dudleya cymosa subspecies:

- Dudleya cymosa subsp. agourensis K.M. Nakai - (Agoura Hills dudleya)
- Dudleya cymosa subsp. crebrifolia K.M. Nakai & Verity - (San Gabriel River dudleya)
- Dudleya cymosa subsp. costatifolia Bartel & Shevock - (Pierpoint springs dudleya)
- Dudleya cymosa subsp. cymosa (Lem.) Britton & Rose - (canyon liveforever)
- Dudleya cymosa subsp. marcescens Moran - (Marcescent dudleya)
- Dudleya cymosa. subsp. ovatifolia - (Santa Monica Mountains dudleya)
- Dudleya cymosa subsp. paniculata (Jeps.) K.M. Nakai - (Diablo range dudleya)
- Dudleya cymosa subsp. pumila (Rose) K.M. Nakai - (Transverse ranges liveforever)

The subspecies marcescens and ovatifolia are federally listed as threatened species of the United States.

== Butterfly habitat ==
Dudleya cymosa is the larval host plant for the Sonoran blue butterfly, Philotes sonorensis (Lycaenidae).

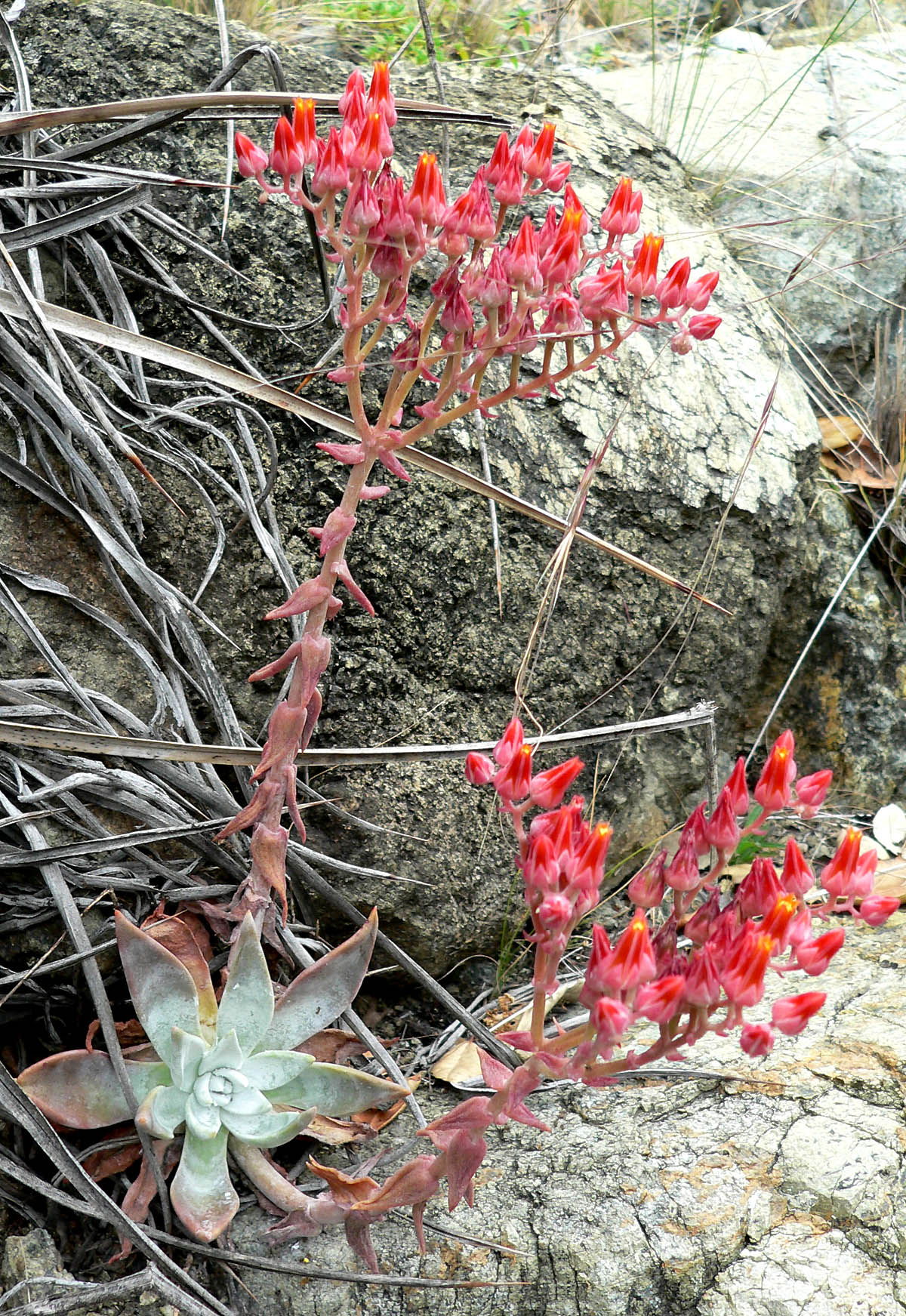
Basal rosette, erect stems, and inflorescences
