= Ensenada =

City in Baja California, Mexico

- City
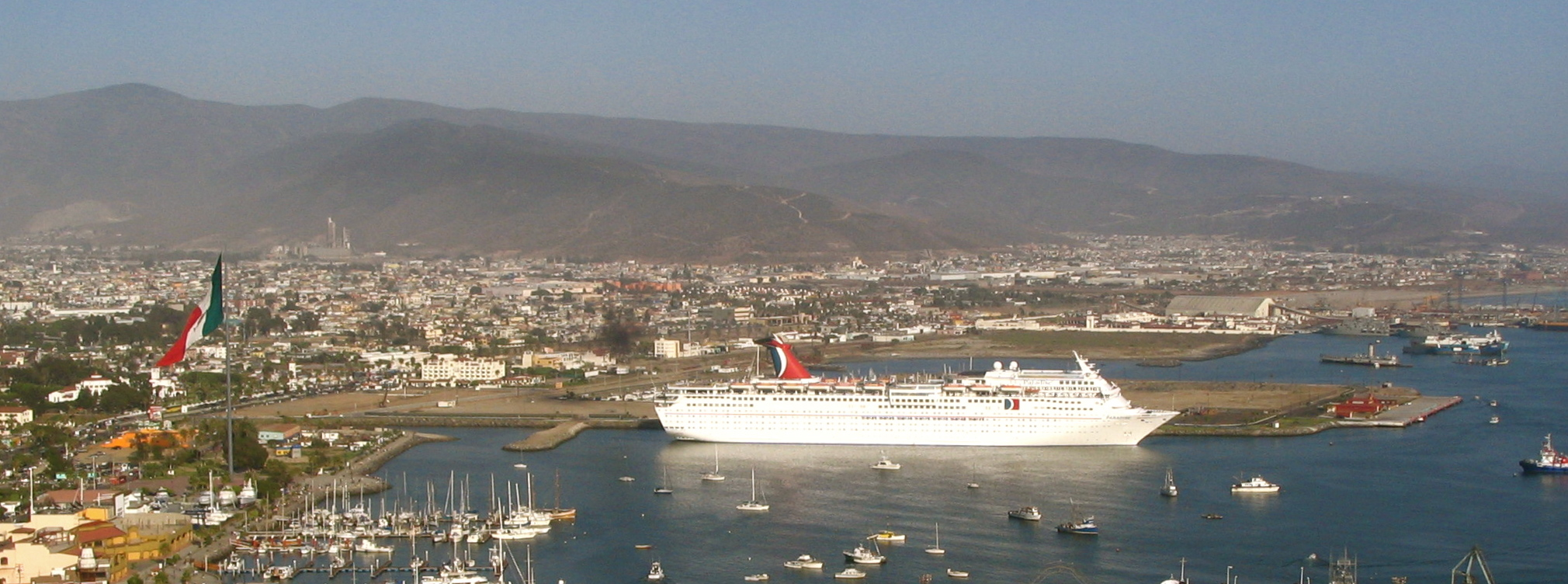
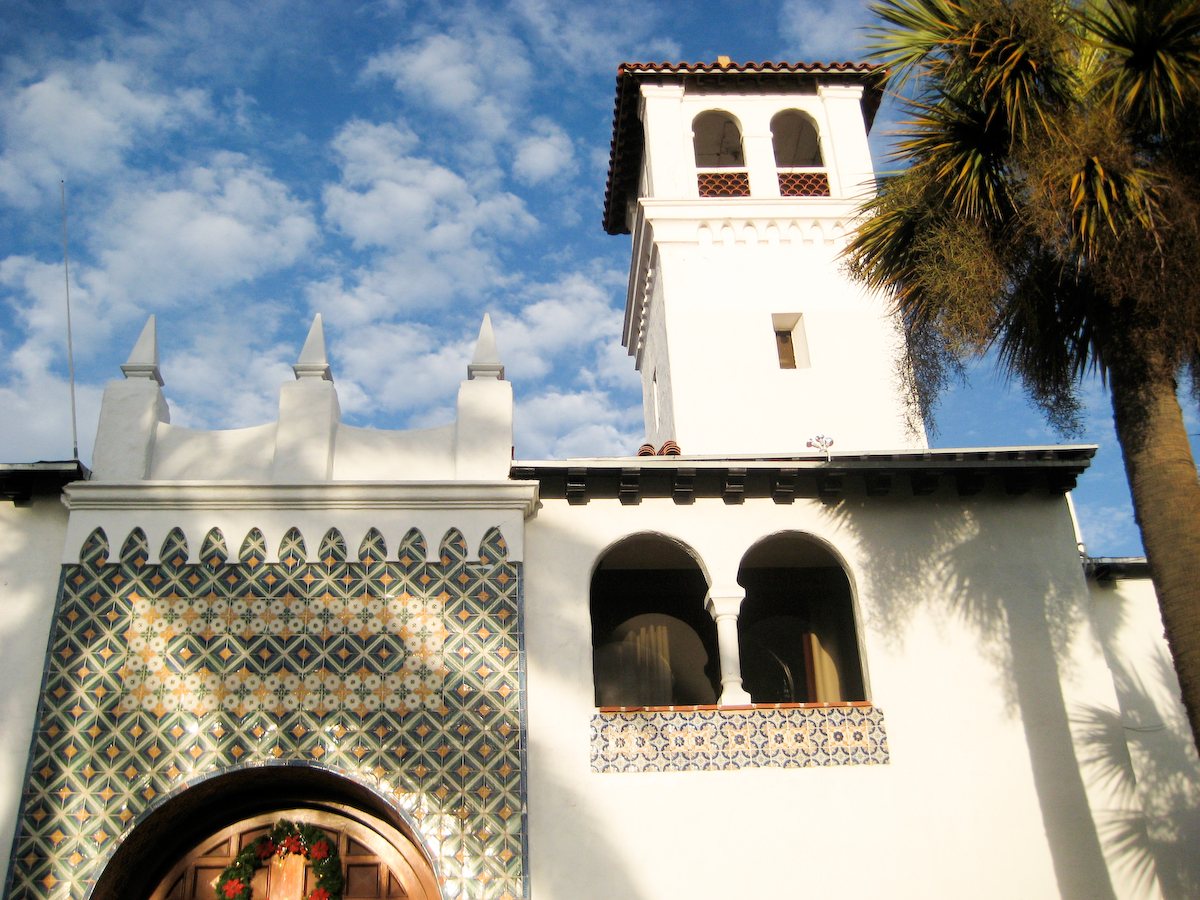
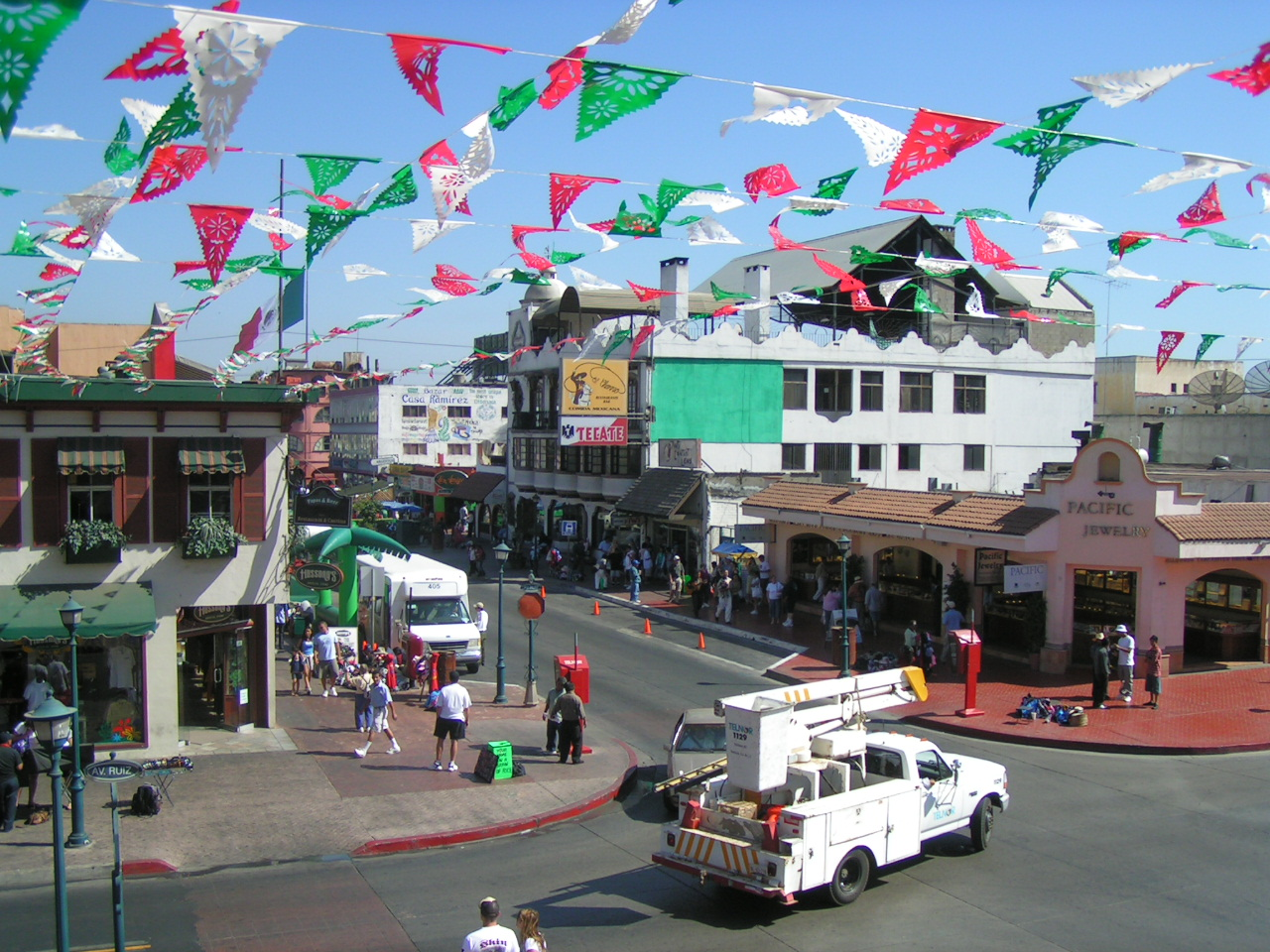
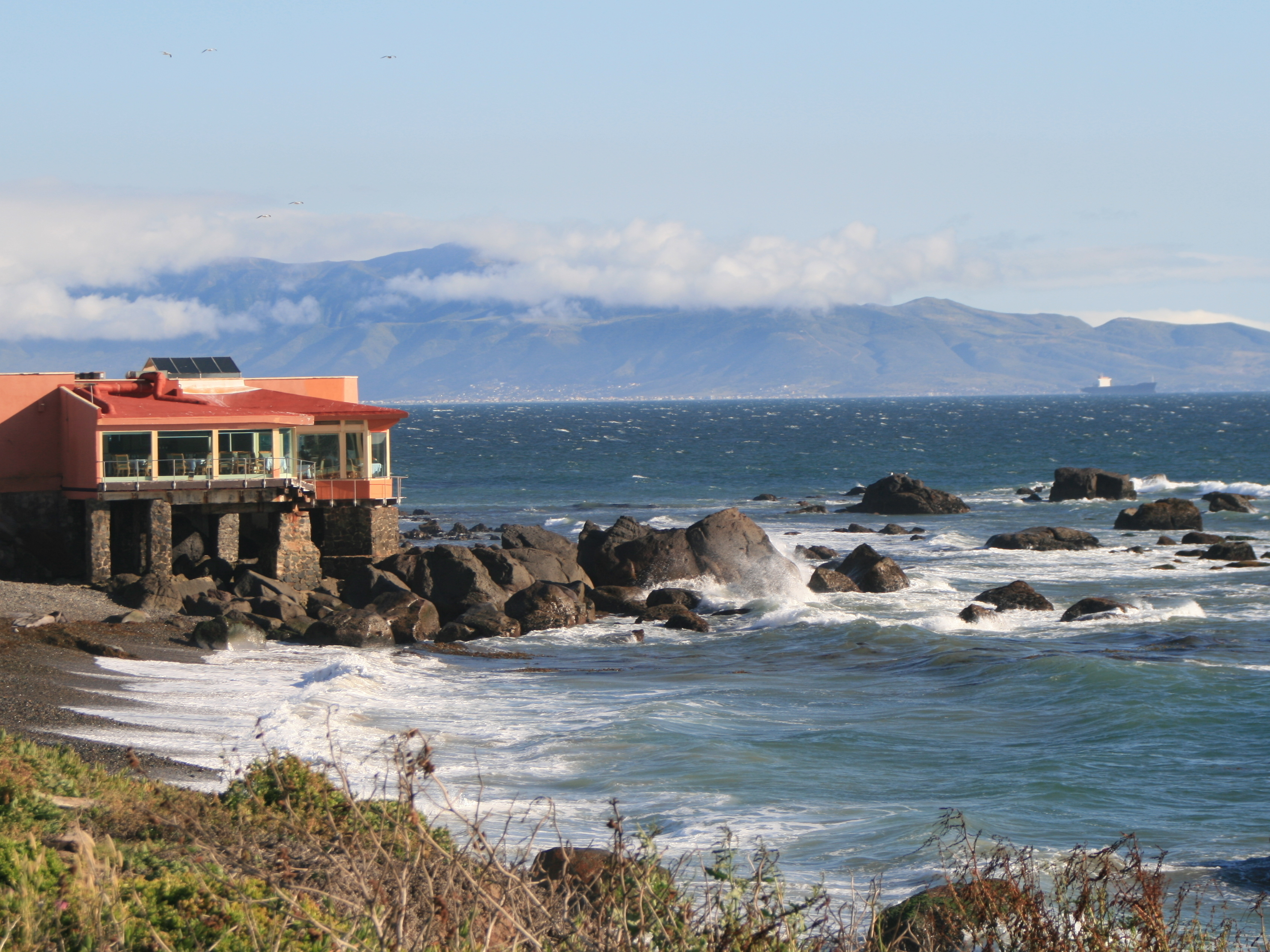
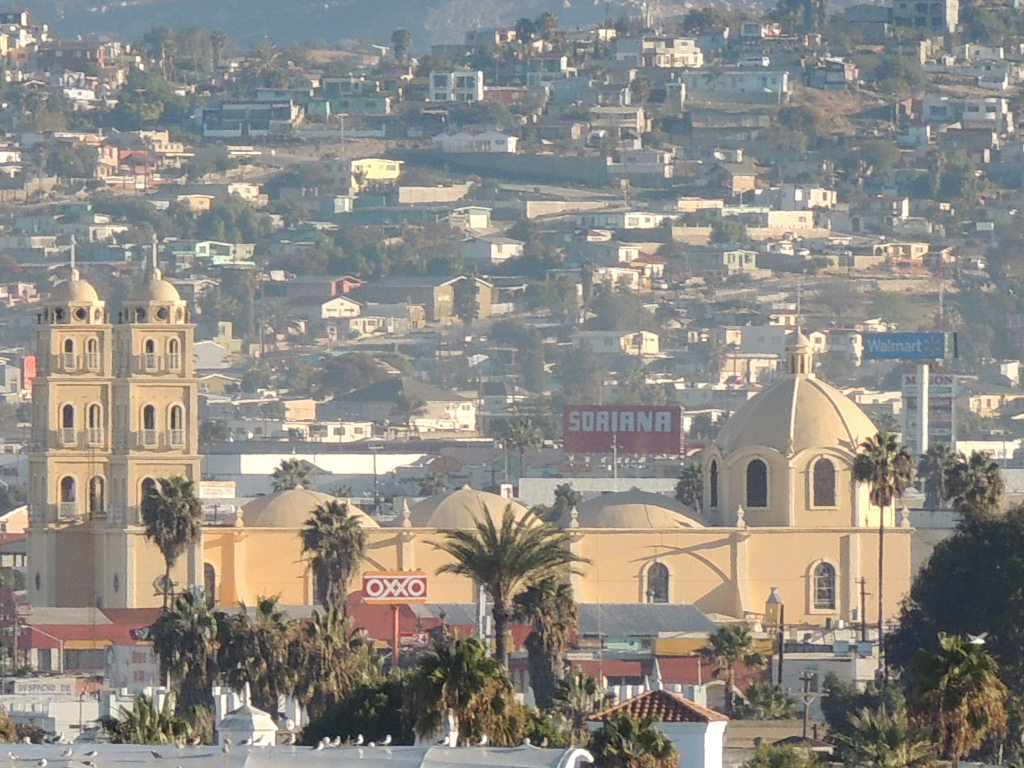
- Top: View of Ensenada from the Pacific; 2nd row: Riviera del Pacífico Cultural Center (left), downtown Ensenada (right); 3rd row: Ensenada's Pacific Coast (left) and Cathedral of Our Lady of Guadalupe (right).

- Flag Coat of arms
- Nicknames: Cenicienta del Pacífico (Cinderella of the Pacific)
- Location in Mexico Ensenada (Mexico)
- Coordinates: 31°51′28″N 116°36′21″W
- Country: Mexico
- State: Baja California
- Municipality: Ensenada
- Founded: May 15, 1882 (by Porfirio Díaz)

Government
  - Type: Ayuntamiento
  - Municipal President: Claudia Agatón Muñiz

Area
  - Municipality: 19,878 km^{2} (7,675 sq mi)
  - City: 79.17 km^{2} (30.57 sq mi)
- Elevation: 16 m (52 ft)

Population (2020 census)
  - Municipality: 443,807
  - Density: 22.327/km^{2} (57.825/sq mi)
  - City: 330,652
  - City density: 4,176/km^{2} (10,820/sq mi)
- Demonym(s): Ensenadan (English), ensenadense (Spanish)
- Time zone: UTC–08:00 (Zona Noroeste)
  - Summer (DST): UTC–07:00 (DST)
- Postal codes: 22800–22899
- Area code: +52 646

Ensenada ('inlet', pronounced [enseˈnaða]) is a city in Ensenada Municipality, Baja California, situated on the Pacific Coast of Mexico. Located on Bahía de Todos Santos, the city had a population of 279,765 in 2018, making it the third-largest city in Baja California. The city is an important international trade center and home to the Port of Ensenada, the second-busiest port in Mexico. Ensenada is a major tourist destination, owing to its warm climate and proximity to the Pacific Ocean, and is commonly known as La Cenicienta del Pacífico ("The Cinderella of the Pacific").

Ensenada was founded in 1882, when the small community of Rancho Ensenada de Santos was made the regional capital for the northern partition of the Baja California Territory. The city grew significantly with the proliferation of mines in the surrounding mountains. While the Mexican Revolution curtailed much of Ensenada's expansion, the onset of Prohibition in the United States transformed the city into a popular tourist destination for Americans seeking entertainment and alcohol. Ensenada's reputation as a resort town was cemented by the 1950s and 1960s, which saw a construction boom and the city's rise in international prominence outside of North America.

Today, Ensenada is a major economic and cultural hub for Baja California. The city is home to numerous universities, like the Ensenada Institute of Technology and the Autonomous University of Baja California, Ensenada. Ensenada is an important biotechnology hub and is home to numerous research institutions, like the Ensenada Center for Scientific Research. The city is a member of the UNESCO Creative Cities Network.

== History ==
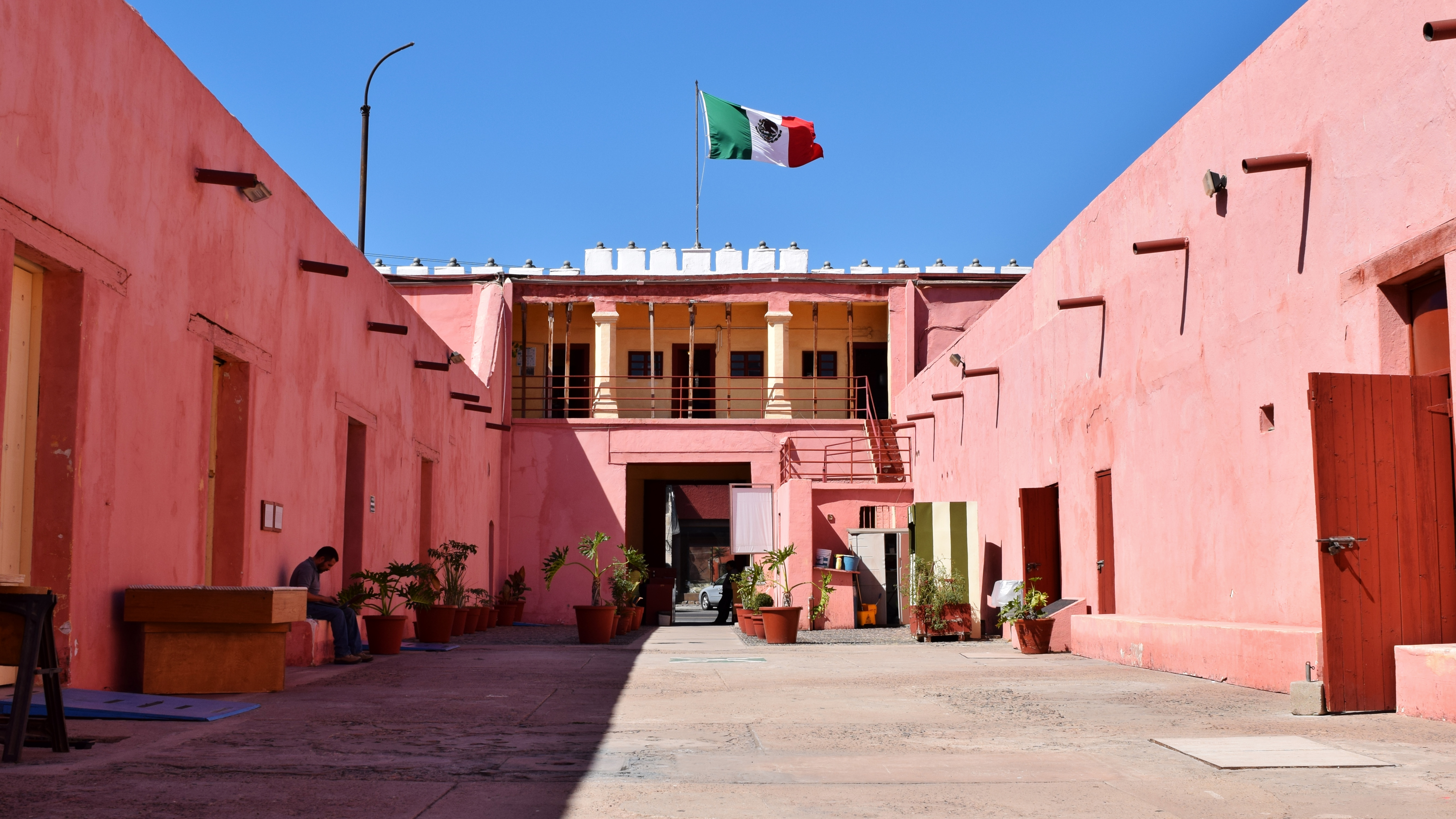
The historic Mexican Army Barracks, built in 1886, is today a history museum.

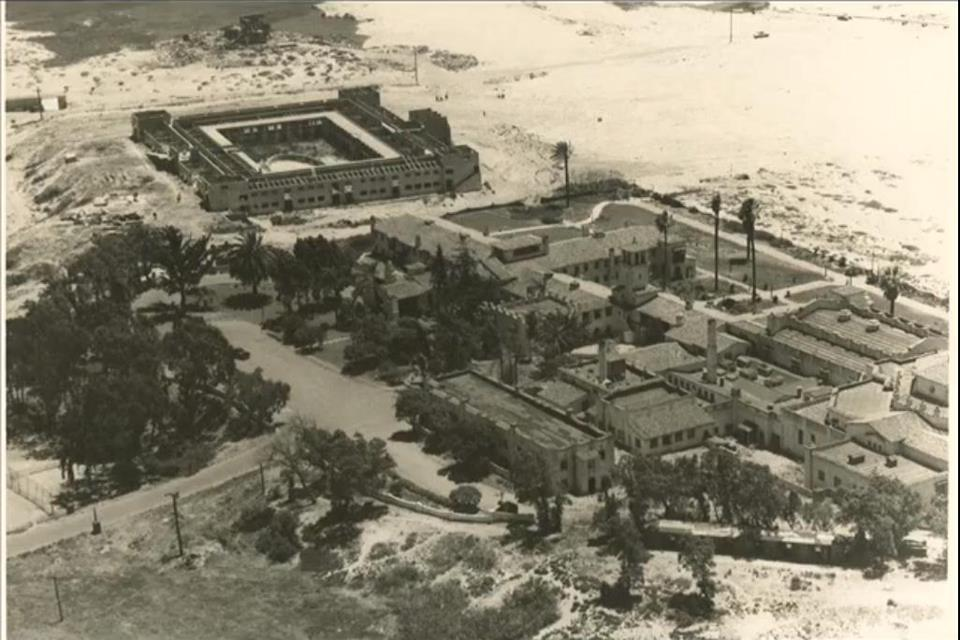
Hotel Riviera del Pacífico in 1930

At the time the first European explorers arrived in the region, Yuman–Cochimí speaking peoples inhabited the region. Groups such as the Kiliwa, Paipai and Kumeyaay still exist. These hunter-gatherer indigenous peoples lived in the bay area and interior valleys of the Sierra de Juárez and Sierra de San Pedro Mártir. The Kumeyaay had a village where the city is seated that was called Pa-tai.

Bahía de Todos Santos, which Ensenada now borders, was first reached by sea by the Spanish explorer Juan Rodríguez Cabrillo on the vessels El Salvador and Victoria. The city was founded on September 17, 1542, under the name San Mateo. In 1602, while mapping the coast of the Californias in search of safe harbors for returning Spanish galleons from Manila to Acapulco, Sebastián Vizcaíno renamed the city to Ensenada de Todos Santos. Ensenada means "bay" or "cove".

The first permanent settlement was established by the Jesuits during the 17th or 18th century. After the expulsion of the Jesuits in 1768, Dominicans took over the representation of Europe in what is now Ensenada. In 1805, José Manuel Ruiz Carillo obtained permission to establish himself in Ensenada, being appointed governor of Baja California and building in Ensenada a house that survived until the final part of that century, despite being briefly taken by William Walker, the self-declared "president" of the Republic of Baja California, in 1853–54.

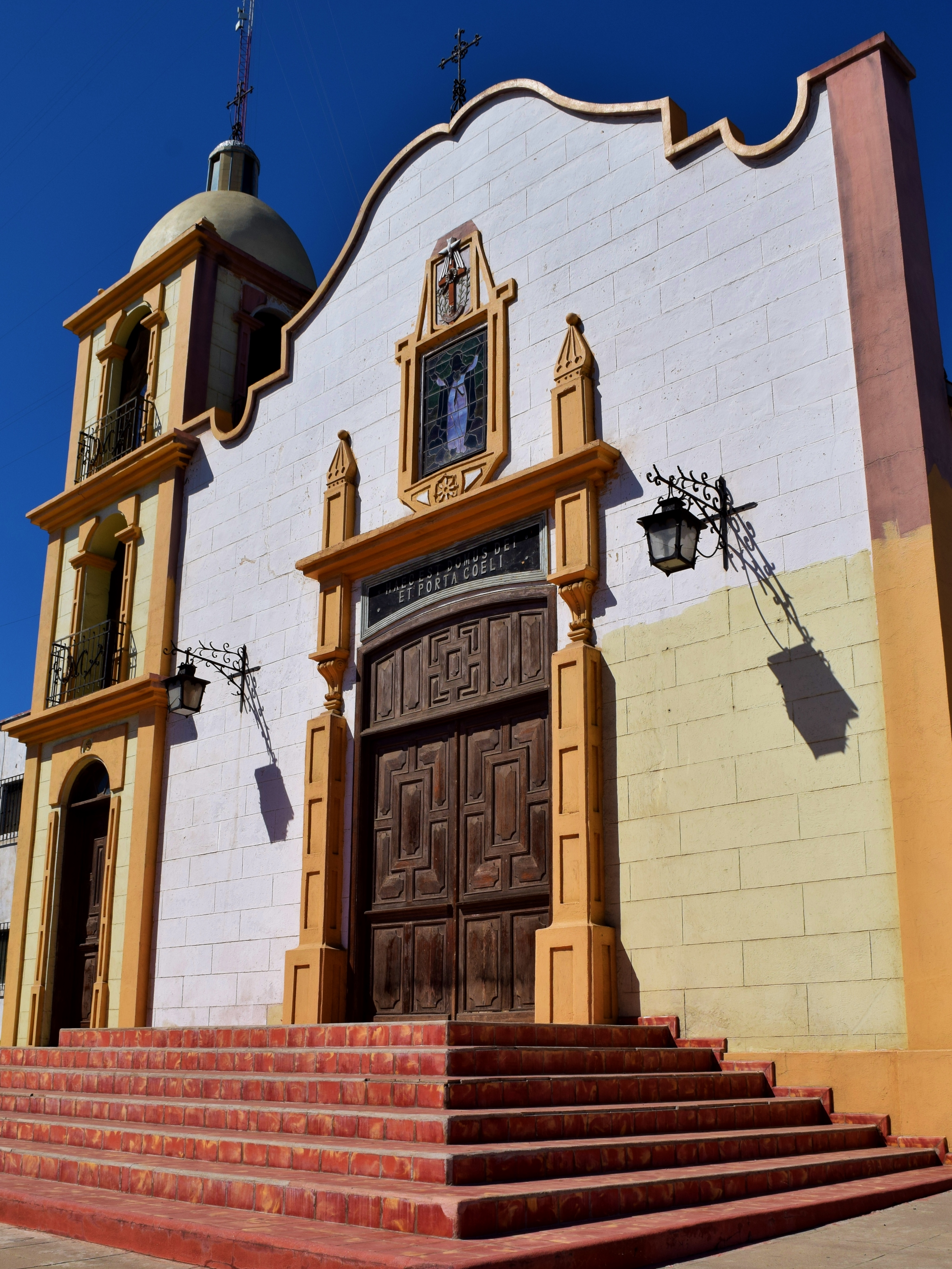
Purísimo Corazón de María Church was built at the turn of the 19th and 20th centuries.

In 1882, Ensenada was designated the capital of Baja California, and attempts at developing the area were made by the English Mexican Land and Colonization Company. These were interrupted by the Mexican Revolution, which left the area devastated. In 1915, the capital was transferred to Mexicali, and in 1930, the population of Ensenada was only 5,000. During the early part of the twentieth century, the city's name was shortened from Ensenada de Todos Santos to Ensenada, a change made in order to avoid confusion with Todos Santos in Baja California Sur.

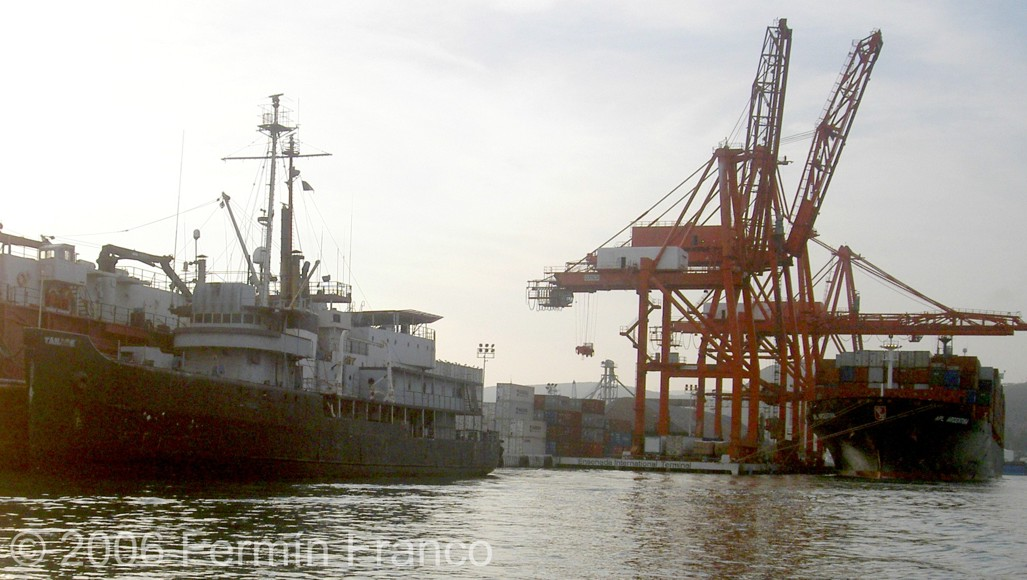
The Port of Ensenada, built in 1994, is one the busiest ports on the Pacific Coast of North America.

The twentieth-century development of Ensenada was assisted by prohibition, which sent Americans and Canadians south of their border in search of entertainment and alcohol, developing first Tijuana, then Rosarito, and finally Ensenada as tourist destinations. The Hotel Riviera del Pacífico was opened in 1930, briefly placing Ensenada on the international glamour map and was visited several times by President Miguel Alemán Valdés, international artists and political personalities.

Ensenada truly began to flourish in the early 1950s, at which time the city's population had risen to 20,000. The hotel finally closed in 1964. It was later reopened as a cultural center and museum. By this time, other hotels had opened, and the population and economy of Ensenada had grown and diversified towards their present status.

On January 26, 2007, Pope Benedict XVI created the Roman Catholic Diocese of Ensenada with territory taken from the Archdiocese of Tijuana and Mexicali Diocese, making it a suffragan diocese of the Metropolitan Church of Tijuana.

In 2023, ten people were killed in a shootout.

== Geography ==
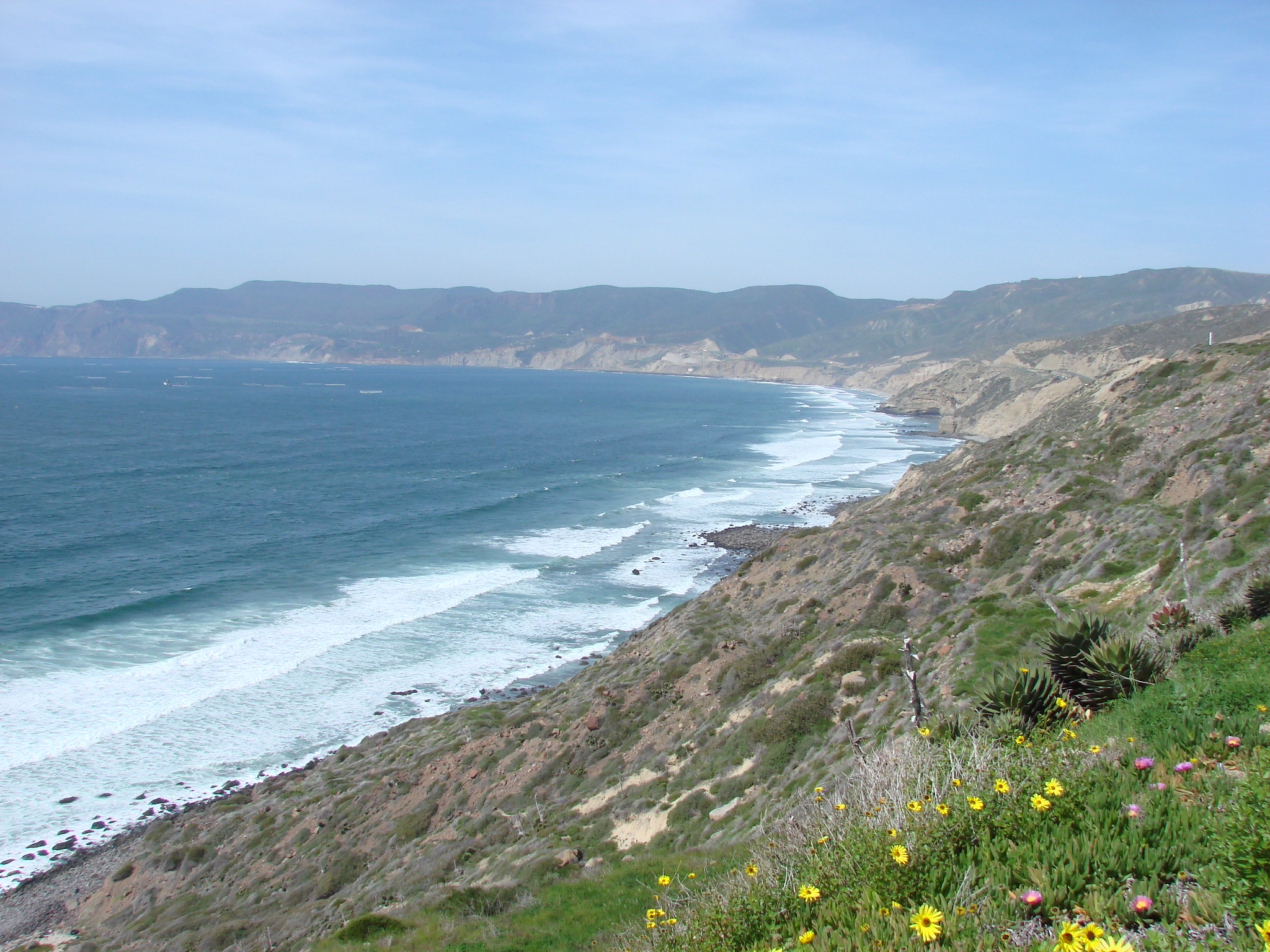
Ensenada's Pacific Coast

Many of the terrestrial or marine species inhabiting the surrounding the Greater Ensenada area in the Baja California islands are unique. Guadalupe Island, off the coast of the city, is one of the best places in the world for observing the great white shark. The island has been a wildlife sanctuary since 1975.

The city's offshore is host to an array of aquatic mammals including the gray whale, the northern elephant seal, the Guadalupe fur seal and California sea lion; terrestrial mammals include various squirrel species, otters, the ring-tailed cat, coyote, bobcat, and puma.

Bird species include hawks, pelicans, roadrunners, and various waterfowl and oceangoing species.

Fish include tilapia, rainbow trout, leopard shark, and the great white shark.

There are no rivers in the city, only surface runoff streams that flow when there have been large amounts of rainfall.

Ensenada has one natural fresh water body, the Lagunita pond, located to the north of El Ciprés military air field, and which has ecological importance.

=== Climate ===
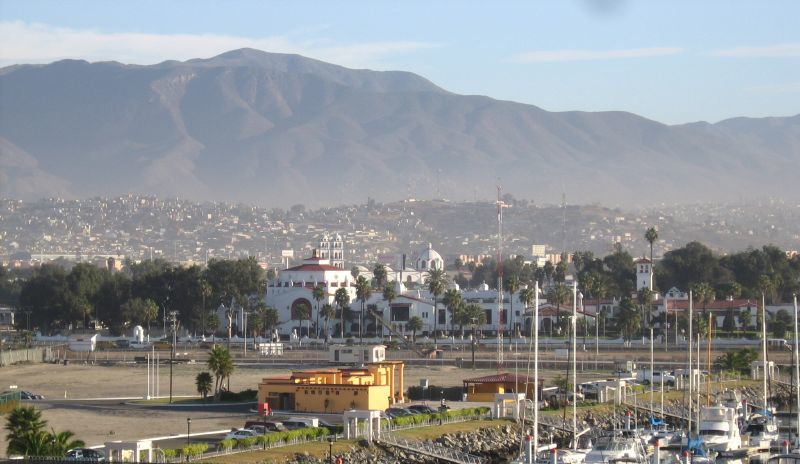
Panoramic view of Ensenada

The average rainfall is 280 millimetres (11 in) per year, falling mainly in the winter months. Ensenada has a mild semi-arid climate (Köppen BSk), much like the rest of northwestern Baja California. During the colder months from November to February, rainfall is scarce and temperatures average 13 °C (55 °F). On the other hand, the warmer months from June to September are the driest, and during this time maintain an average temperature of 21 °C (70 °F).

For Ensenada's warm summer coastal location, the city's climate is greatly affected by the offshore cold California Current. Due to the current, the late summer and early fall seasons are typically the warmest periods for the city. Santa Ana winds – observed in much of Southern California as well – are responsible for temperature rises at any time of the year. During Santa Anas, wind direction changes and brings warm air from the interior to the coast. Snowfall is rare with the last recent one in January 2007, when the hills south of the city received small amounts of snowfall.

Similar to the South Coast of California, Ensenada experiences the periodic May Gray and June Gloom marine layer effects.

Climate data for Ensenada (Presa Emilio Lopez Zamora, located on the outskirts) 1991–2020
Month	Jan	Feb	Mar	Apr	May	Jun	Jul	Aug	Sep	Oct	Nov	Dec	Year
Record high °C (°F)	32.0 (89.6)	34.0 (93.2)	38.5 (101.3)	41.0 (105.8)	41.0 (105.8)	43.0 (109.4)	36.0 (96.8)	37.0 (98.6)	43.5 (110.3)	41.5 (106.7)	38.5 (101.3)	36.0 (96.8)	43.5 (110.3)
Mean daily maximum °C (°F)	20.6 (69.1)	20.2 (68.4)	20.8 (69.4)	22.0 (71.6)	22.5 (72.5)	23.7 (74.7)	25.8 (78.4)	26.9 (80.4)	26.8 (80.2)	25.2 (77.4)	23.2 (73.8)	20.2 (68.4)	23.2 (73.8)
Daily mean °C (°F)	14.1 (57.4)	14.2 (57.6)	15.1 (59.2)	16.2 (61.2)	17.8 (64.0)	19.4 (66.9)	21.6 (70.9)	22.5 (72.5)	21.9 (71.4)	19.4 (66.9)	16.6 (61.9)	13.8 (56.8)	17.7 (63.9)
Mean daily minimum °C (°F)	7.7 (45.9)	8.1 (46.6)	9.3 (48.7)	10.4 (50.7)	13.0 (55.4)	15.1 (59.2)	17.4 (63.3)	18.1 (64.6)	16.9 (62.4)	13.5 (56.3)	10.0 (50.0)	7.3 (45.1)	12.2 (54.0)
Record low °C (°F)	−1.6 (29.1)	−3.6 (25.5)	0.0 (32.0)	−6.0 (21.2)	3.5 (38.3)	2.5 (36.5)	1.0 (33.8)	8.5 (47.3)	6.5 (43.7)	0.8 (33.4)	−0.7 (30.7)	−3.0 (26.6)	−6.0 (21.2)
Average precipitation mm (inches)	50.3 (1.98)	61.5 (2.42)	42.2 (1.66)	16.0 (0.63)	6.6 (0.26)	1.0 (0.04)	0.5 (0.02)	1.0 (0.04)	2.8 (0.11)	11.4 (0.45)	19.6 (0.77)	45.9 (1.81)	258.8 (10.19)
Average precipitation days (≥ 0.1 mm)	6.1	7.1	6.0	3.9	2.4	1.0	0.8	0.9	1.2	2.3	3.5	6.2	41.4
Average relative humidity (%)	80	78	79	81	82	83	83	83	83	82	78	78	81
Source 1: Servicio Meteorologico Nacional
Source 2: Colegio de Postgraduados (humidity, 1951–1980)

== Demographics ==
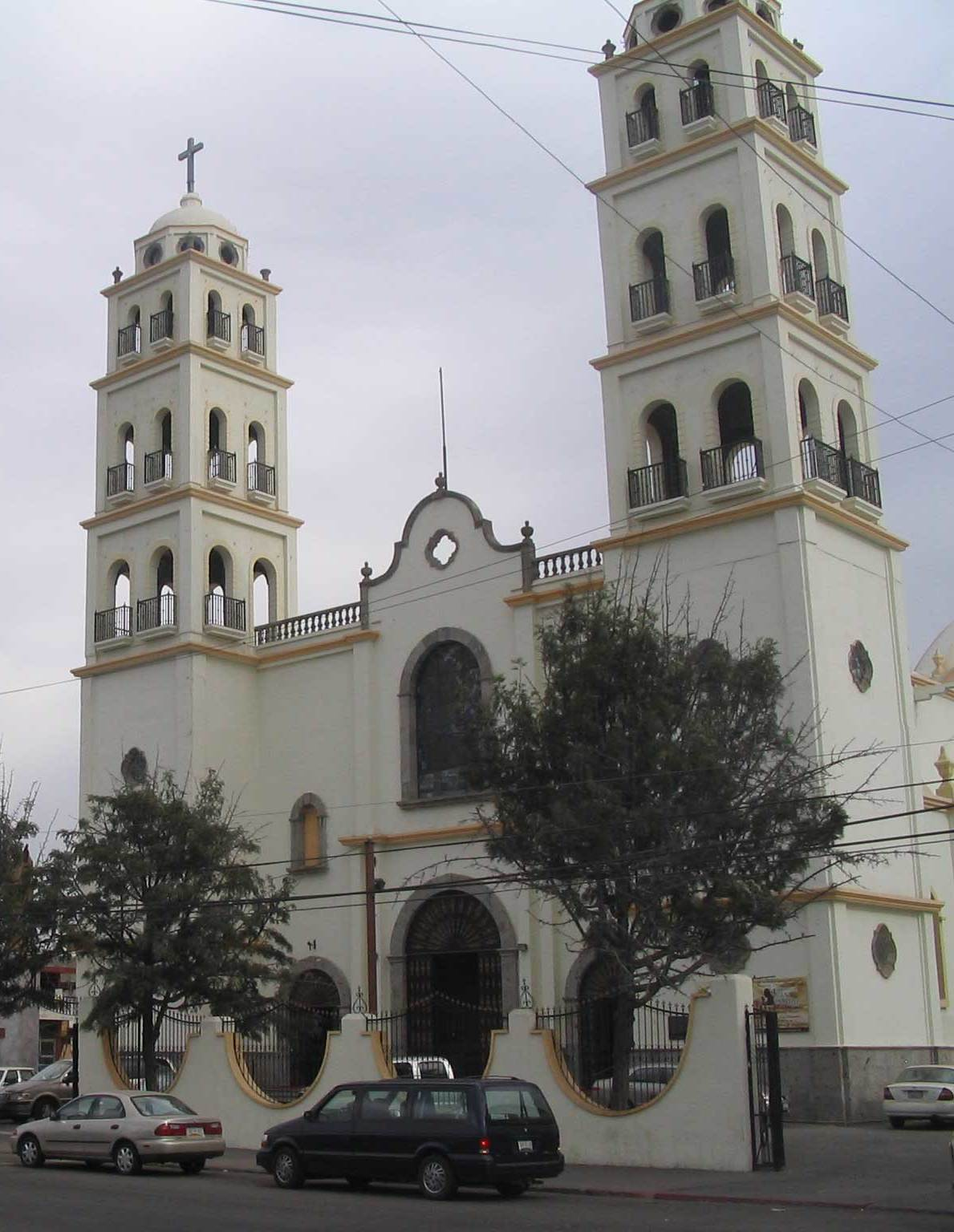
The Cathedral of Our Lady of Guadalupe is the seat of the Catholic Diocese of Ensenada.

Historical population
Year	Pop.	±%
1990	169,426	—
1995	192,550	+13.6%
2000	223,492	+16.1%
2005	260,075	+16.4%
2010	466,814	+79.5%
2015	519,813	+11.4%

The populace of Ensenada is cosmopolitan in composition. A reflection of the cultural dynamics involved in the city, many ethnic groups and nationalities are present.

Ensenada is the third-largest city in Baja California, following Tijuana and Mexicali.

The predominant language of the city is Spanish, though English is spoken to a degree in tourist areas and the city center.

== Government ==
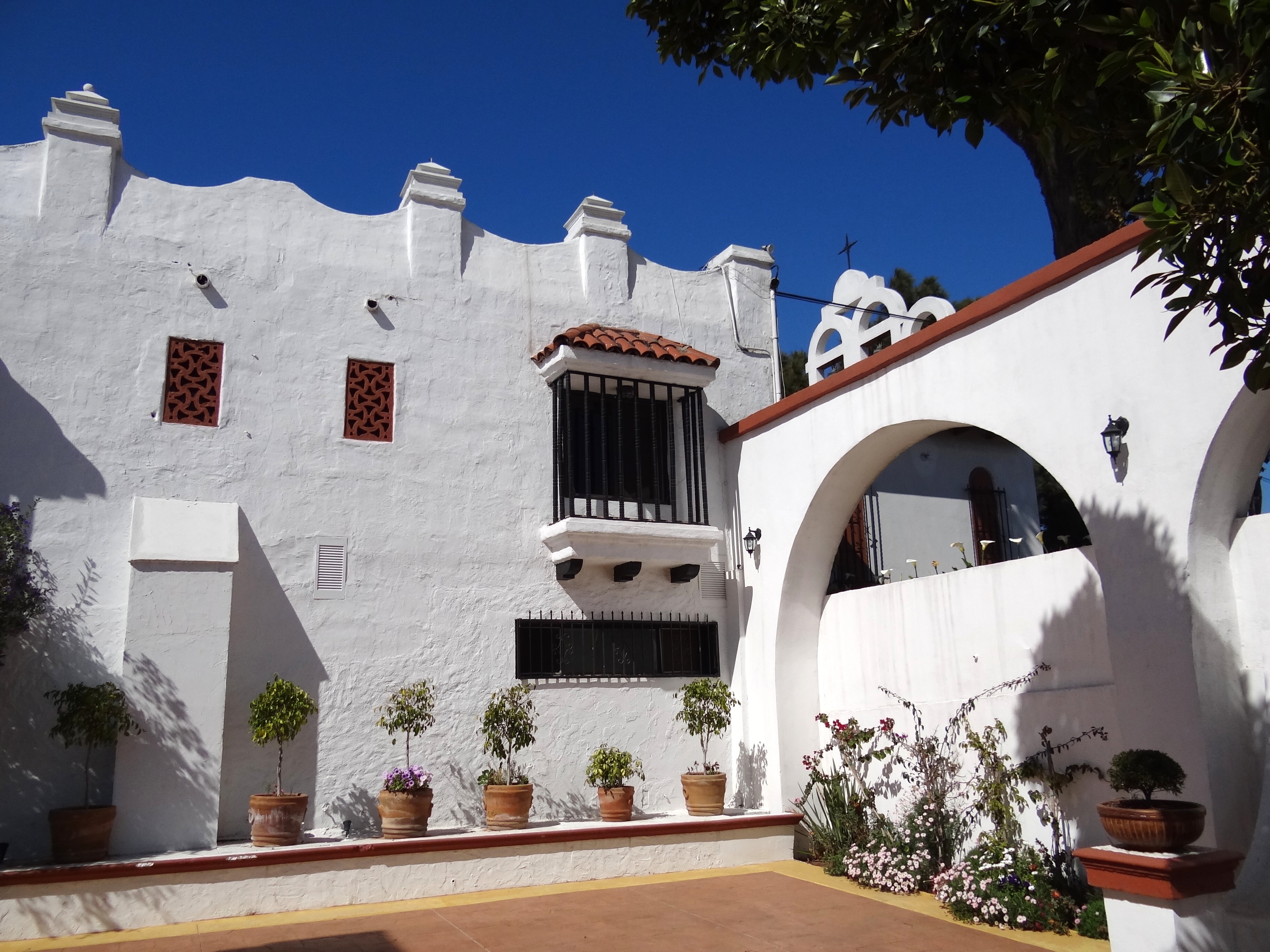
Riviera del Pacífico Cultural Center.

Ensenada is the municipal seat of the Ensenada Municipality. The city is made up of the boroughs of Ensenada and Chapultepec.

The city is administered by a city council. Port lands are administered by the Port Authority of Ensenada.

Ensenada is covered by the Third Federal Electoral District of Baja California, which elects 1 member to the federal Chamber of Deputies.

Public utilities

The Emilio López Zamora dam was built in 1976 by the federal government, with the objective of controlling overflow and supporting the water supply of the city.

On June 10, 2018, a desalination plant with a capacity of 250 L (55 imp gal; 66 US gal) per second started operation.

== Economy ==
=== Tourism ===
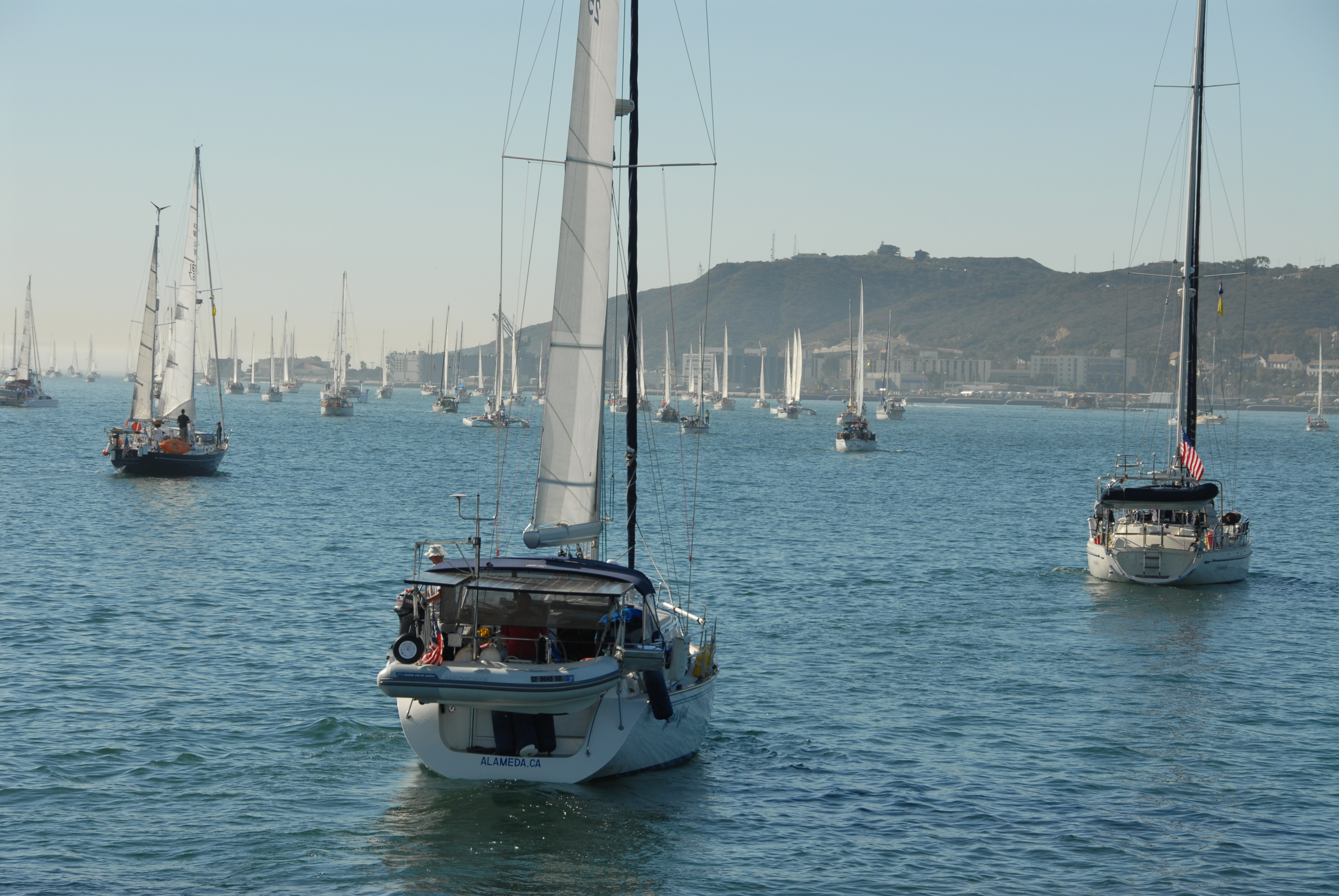
The Baja Ha-Ha boat race in the Bahía de Todos Santos.

Ensenada is located some 108 kilometres (67 mi) south of the border with the United States, connected via a four-lane toll road MX-1D and a two lane free road, which makes it a natural destination for tourists on short vacations by car. Ensenada's proximity to California also makes it a destination for short cruise ship trips from the ports of Los Angeles, Long Beach, and San Diego. As of 2026, five cruise lines call in Ensenada regularly during the fall and winter: Carnival Cruise Line, Disney Cruise Line, Holland America, Princess Cruises, and Royal Caribbean. The world-renowned Baja 1000 off-road race is held in Ensenada every year in late November, while the Baja 500 race is held in early June. Off-road enthusiasts use Ensenada year-round as a starting point to explore Baja California.

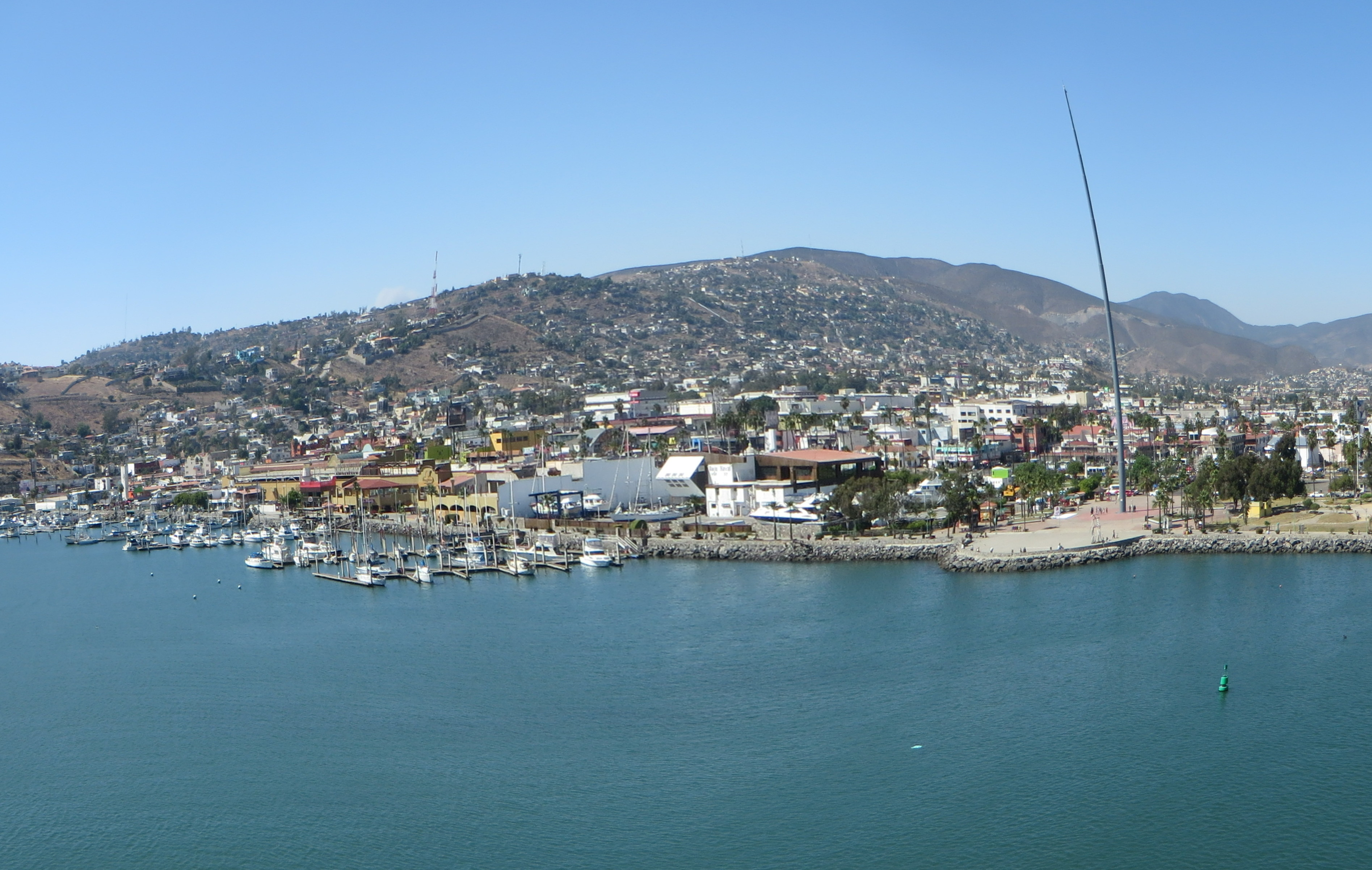
View of Malecón de Ensenada from Port of Ensenada on the Pacific Ocean.

Watersports and ocean proximity have formed an integral part of the structure of tourism and its relation to economics in the city. Ensenada and coastal beach towns of Greater Ensenada have several renowned surfing spots, such as San Miguel Beach, California Trailer Park, Stacks and 3 M's (Tres Emes in Spanish), which are located on the north coast of the city. Todos Santos Island is a small island located west of Ensenada (about two hours by boat) and a world-famous surfing spot. A number of surfing contests, such as the Billabong XXL. have been held at Todos Santos Island. Wave faces can reach above 18 metres (60 ft) on the island and in December 2006 Brad Gerlach, 2006 winner of Big XXL, surfed a wave of 21 metres (68 ft). Tourists also stop in the city on their way to their destinations farther south in the municipality where windsurfing spots are located. Maritime activities associated with the city also include the global Newport to Ensenada International Yacht Race, billed as the world's largest international sailing event, which begins in Newport Beach and finishes in Ensenada. SCORE International's Baja 1000 and Baja 500 desert races also traditionally begin and/or end in the city. Whale watching has also developed as a tourist draw in the city due to the gray whale's annual migration from Alaska to the lagoons of Baja California Sur. Between the months of December and March, and back in the months of April and May, whales can be seen from the coast of Ensenada.

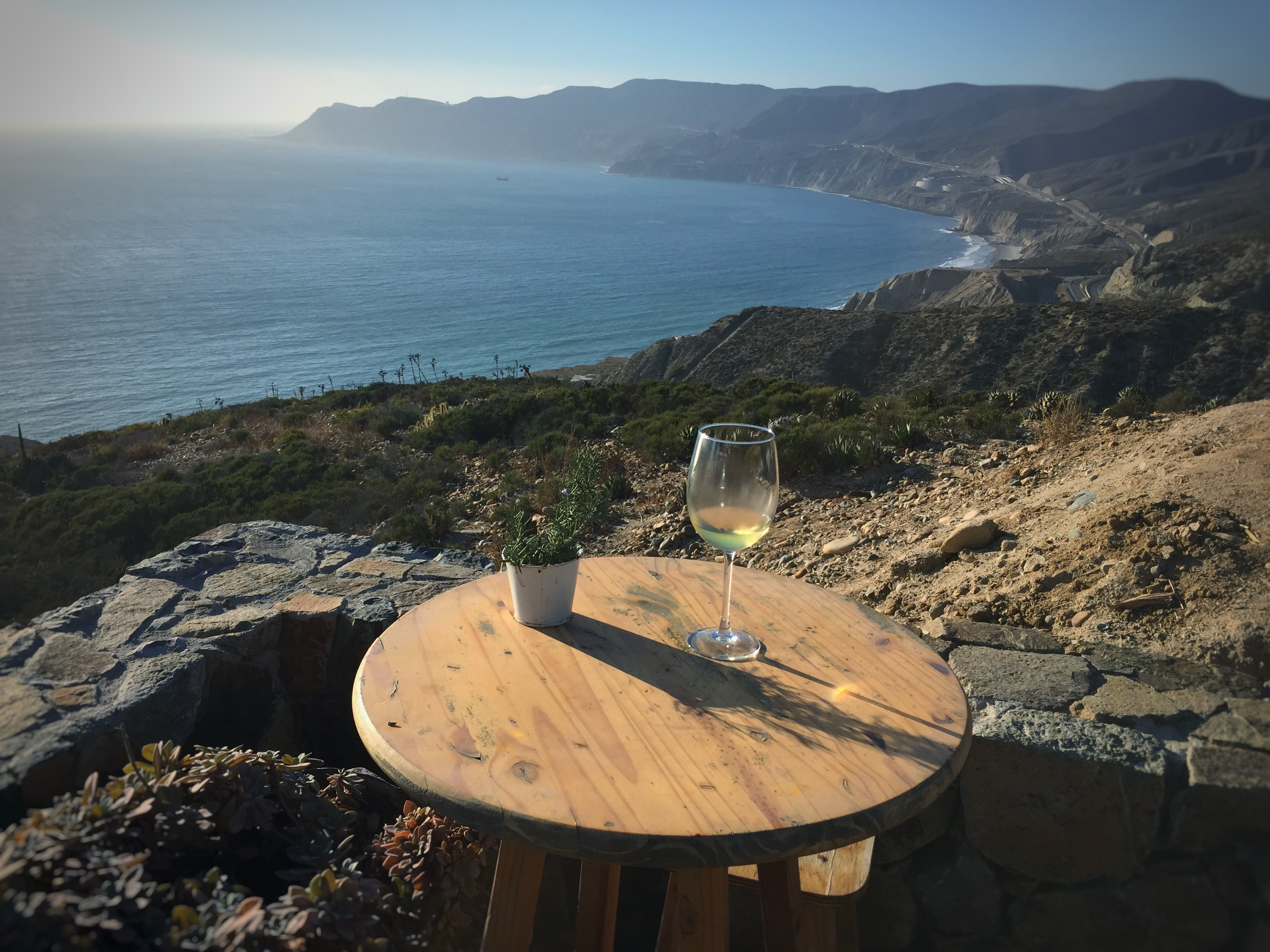
Bar on the Ensenada coast.

The nearby historical mission town of Guadalupe, was revitalized from 1905 to 1910 with immigrant Spiritual Christians, mostly Pryguny from the Caucasus, South Russia. After World War II most moved to California to join more prosperous relatives, while many who remained intermarried with Mexicans and live in Ensenada and Tijuana. Two families remaining in the Guadalupe Valley opened museums, a cafe, and participate in wine tourism. The traditional economic activities in Guadalupe are olive and wine production. Currently, about 90% of wine production in Mexico originates in the valleys of Guadalupe and adjacent Calafia. Many local wine producers offer tours and tastings. Every year during the month of August, the beginning of wine harvest season is celebrated in the Guadalupe Valley and in the city of Ensenada with a two-week-long series of cultural and culinary events, all under the title banner of Fiestas de la Vendimia (Wine Harvest Festival). This event attracts people from all over the world.

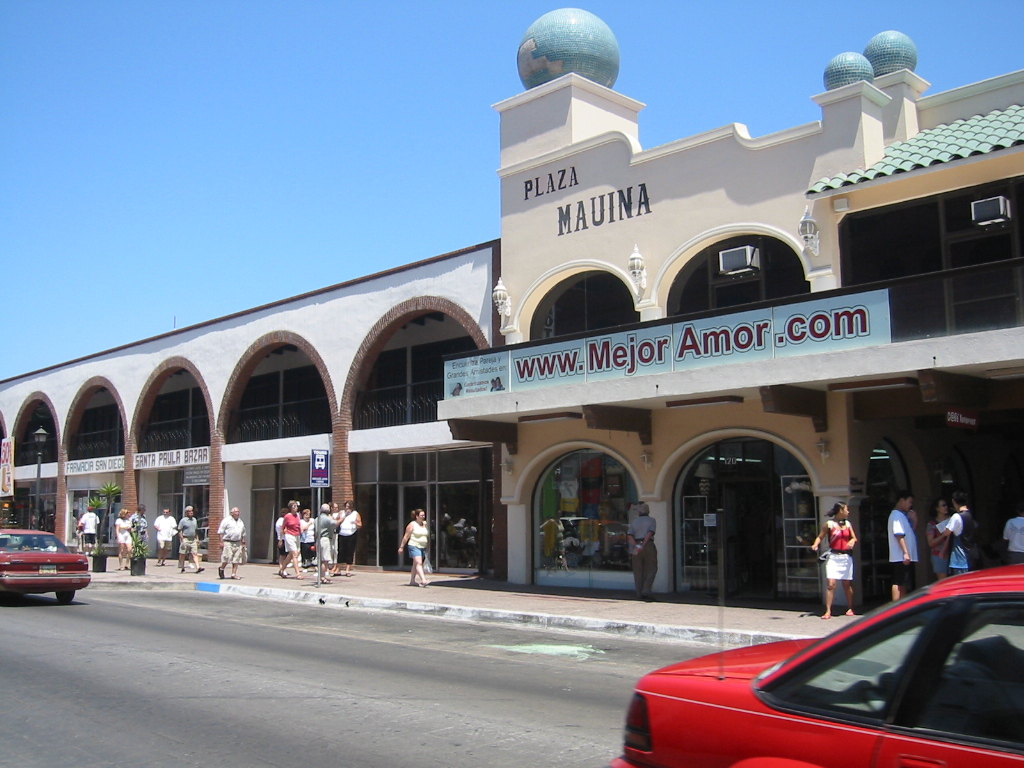
Shops on Calle Primera.

There is a street in Ensenada called "La Calle Primera" or Adolfo Lopez Mateos ("1st Street"). It's a tourism spot in Ensenada due to its many "Curios" (short for "Curiosidades"—trinkets and souvenirs) shops, restaurants, hotels, bars, and popular club. La Primera is a very busy street, filled with tourists and locals. La Primera is just one block away from Ventana al Mar ("Window to the Sea"), a boardwalk/seawall avenue where an enormous Mexican flag is located. The Ensenada Carnaval is one of the country's largest, as thousands of people gather in the streets for six days and nights. Just south of the city on Highway 1 is located one of the largest marine geysers in the world, colloquially known as La Bufadora ("The Blowhole"). La Bufadora attracts many tourists. The street leading to the viewpoint is a commercial area where a variety of authentic Mexican arts and crafts are for sale; bartering over prices with vendors is customary. There are also seafood restaurants and street vendors selling "churros" (fried pastry with cinnamon and sugar) and other delicacies.

=== Research and manufacturing ===
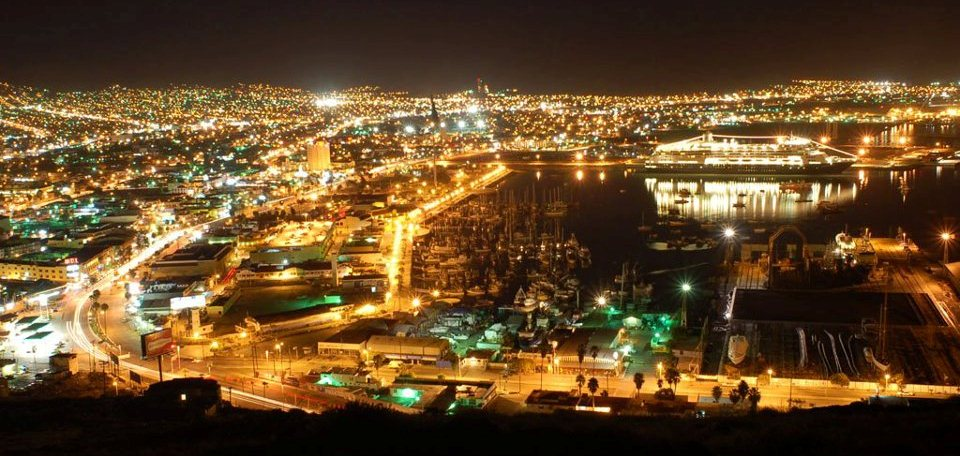
View of Ensenada at night.

Ensenada is developing scientific research and natural science sectors, with special focus in the marine sciences sectors. Ensenada is claimed to be the city with the highest number of scientists per capita in Latin America. The Center of Scientific Research and Higher Education of Ensenada (CICESE) conducts research in Earth Sciences, Applied Physics, Oceanography, Communications and Experimental and Applied Biology. Further research is conducted on the campus of the Autonomous University of Baja California, Ensenada (UABC), mainly in Oceanography and education areas although there are groups in Physics, Biology, and other related sciences. The National Autonomous University of Mexico (UNAM) has a research campus in the city. The campus hosts the Institute of Astronomy and the Centre for Nanosciences and Nanotechnology (CNyN). The National Astronomical Observatory (Mexico) is located on the mountains of the Sierra de San Pedro Martir, south of the city.

The city is home to the largest cluster of bio-medical device companies in Mexico and is a developing center that is drawing a growing number of biotech researchers. Unique to the city is that its biotech cluster is near that of another, larger, cluster in San Diego. The proximity of these two biotech clusters fuels their interaction.

The city is not part of any rail transport grid with which it could use to transport cargo and other materials, although there are plans to build a rail line to the United States border in the short to mid-term future that would link it to San Diego–Tijuana. Unlike the larger cities to the north, Ensenada has only six major industrial parks, compared to 26 in Mexicali and 51 in Tijuana, as its economy is more focused on tourism and technology.

Among the notable manufacturing operations in Ensenada are Fender Musical Instruments Corporation, which has a factory in Ensenada producing electric guitars and basses, and Lowrance fishfinders and maritime navigation devices are manufactured in Ensenada.

=== Maritime industry ===
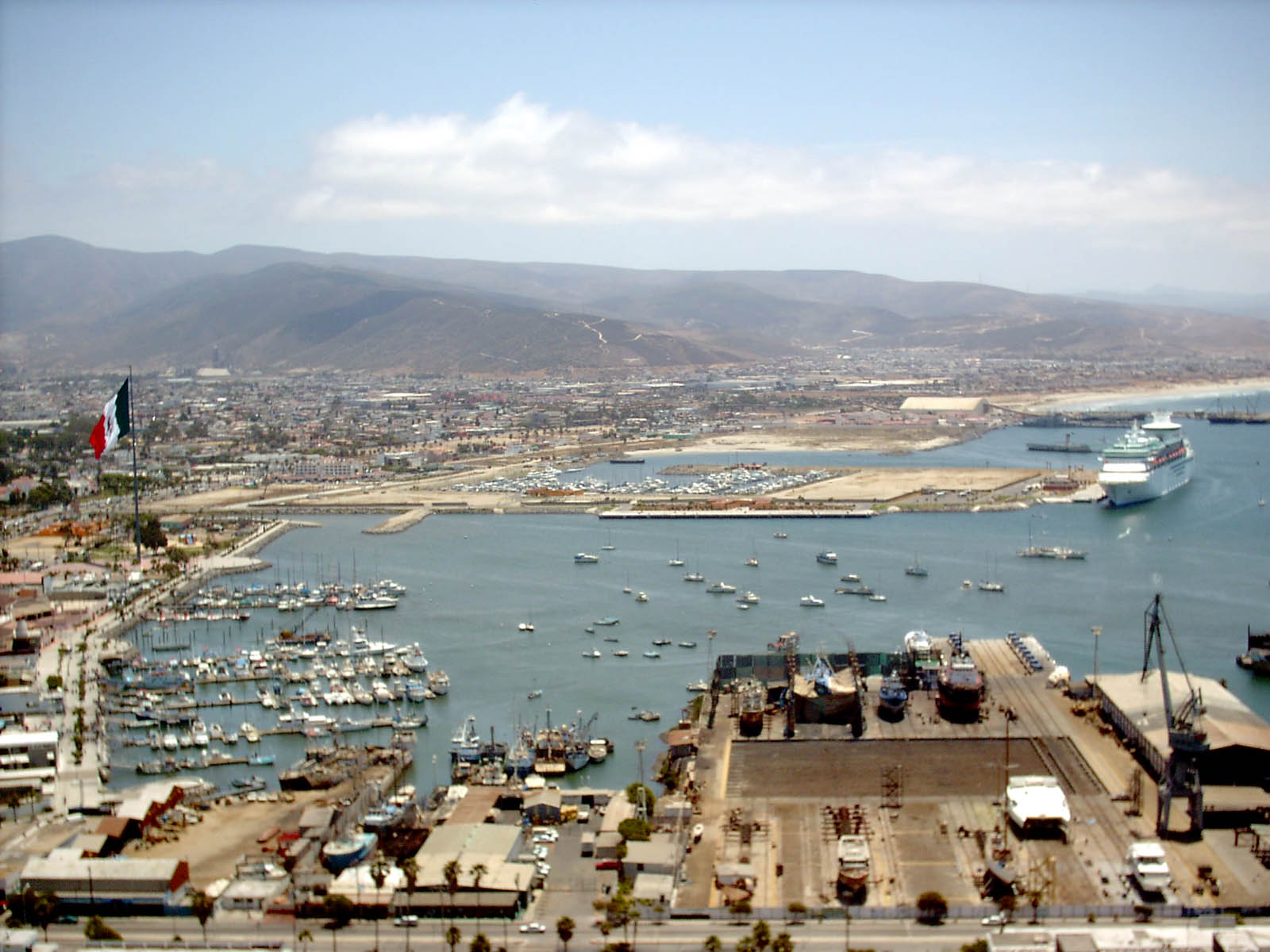
The Port of Ensenada is one of the busiest deepwater ports on the West Coast of North America.

The Port of Ensenada has a large influence on the civic economy. Ensenada is home to the only deep-water port in the state of Baja California and on the Baja California Peninsula. The port is part of standard shipping routes that directly link it with the Mexican cities of La Paz, Manzanillo, Mazatlán, Acapulco and Lázaro Cárdenas; the American cities of San Diego, Long Beach and Los Angeles; the Guatemalan city of Puerto Quetzal, the Chilean city of Valparaíso, the Japanese city of Yokohama, and the city of Hong Kong. Ensenada is where the Fender standard series guitars and basses are produced.

In addition to revenue generated by docking cruise ships, fishing accounts for a large part of the economy. More than 90 species of fish are commercially fished in Ensenada; the most important fisheries are tuna, shrimp, California spiny lobster, abalone, sea urchin, sardine, mackerel and seaweed. A large percentage of all catches are exported to East Asia. A tuna embargo imposed on Mexico during the 1990s caused most of the fishing fleet to relocate to the ports of Guaymas, and Mazatlán, further south. To survive, Ensenada's tuna industry has shifted its focus to tuna farming, exporting the highly valued meat almost exclusively to Japan. Ensenada has been known for sports fishing over 50 years. Each year hundreds of anglers head for Ensenada to go fishing and take advantage of the shorter distances needed to travel by sea to get to the big catch.

=== Agriculture ===
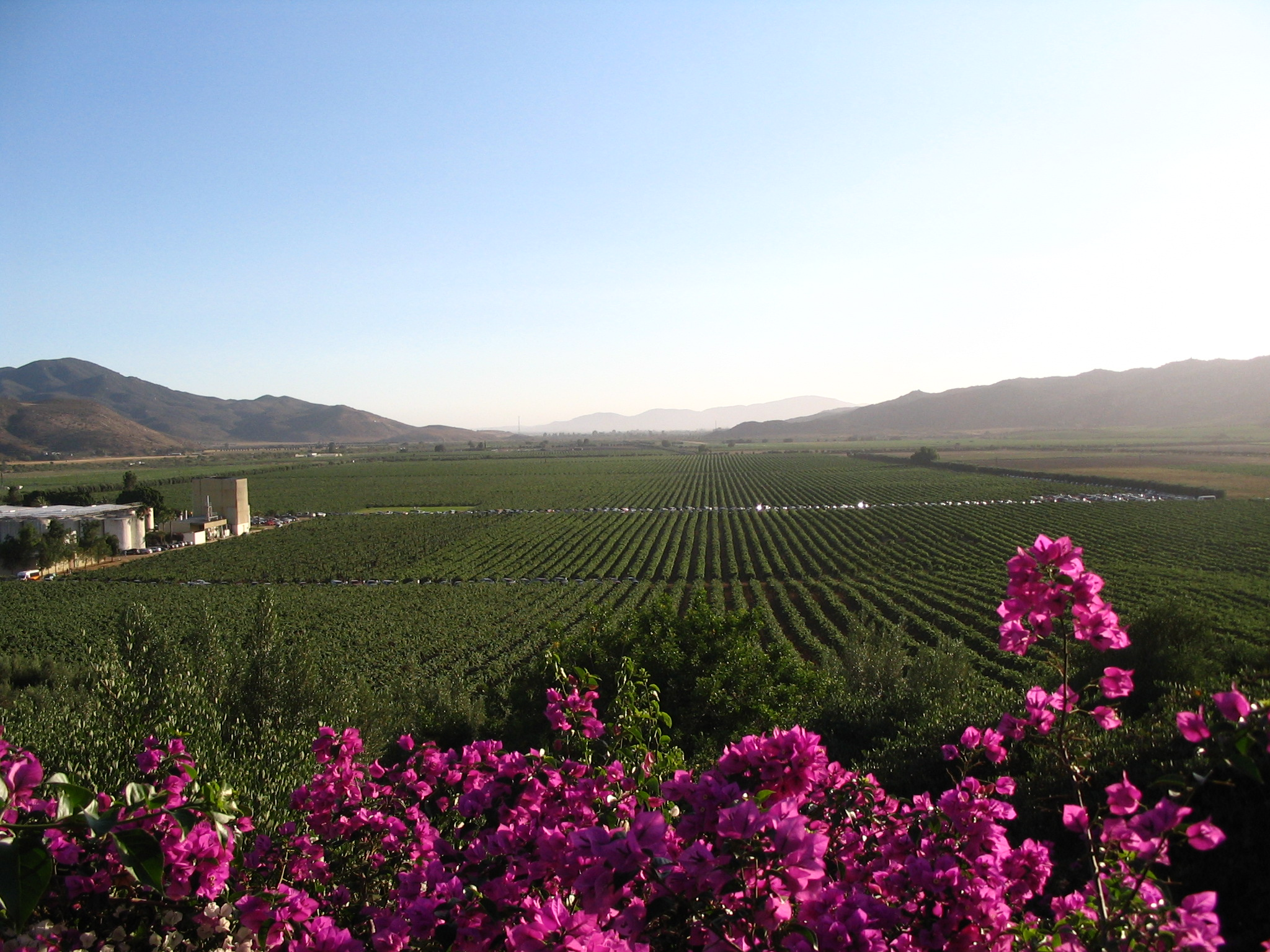
The nearby Valle de Guadalupe is a major wine tourism destination.

The municipality of Ensenada has three main agricultural zones: the Guadalupe-Calafia valleys to the north, the Ojos Negros valley to the east and the San Quintin valley to the south. The main crops are grapes, olives, tomato, wheat, alfalfa, asparagus, green onions and broccoli.

=== Mining ===
One of the earliest activities in the Ensenada region was gold and silver mining, and some of these mines remain in limited operation. In recent years, very large amounts of gravel have been extracted from creek beds in rural areas and exported for infrastructure works in California in the US. However, this has been a controversial activity, as environmentalists have argued that depleting the creekbeds will decrease the amount of water that is absorbed by the soil during the brief rainy season, negatively impacting the agriculture. As of November 2005, the extraction of gravel remains unchecked. Said extraction activities have been linked to former governor Ernesto Ruffo.

== Education ==
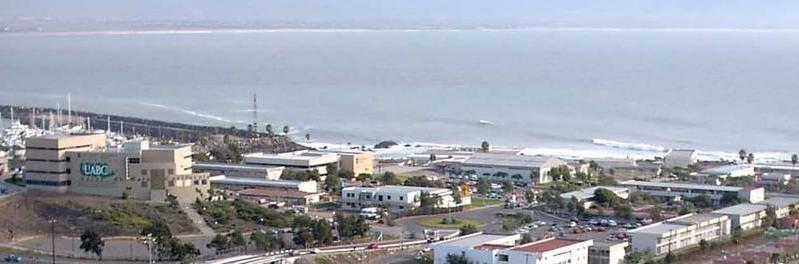
The campus of the Autonomous University of Baja California, Ensenada, located on the Pacific Coast of Mexico.

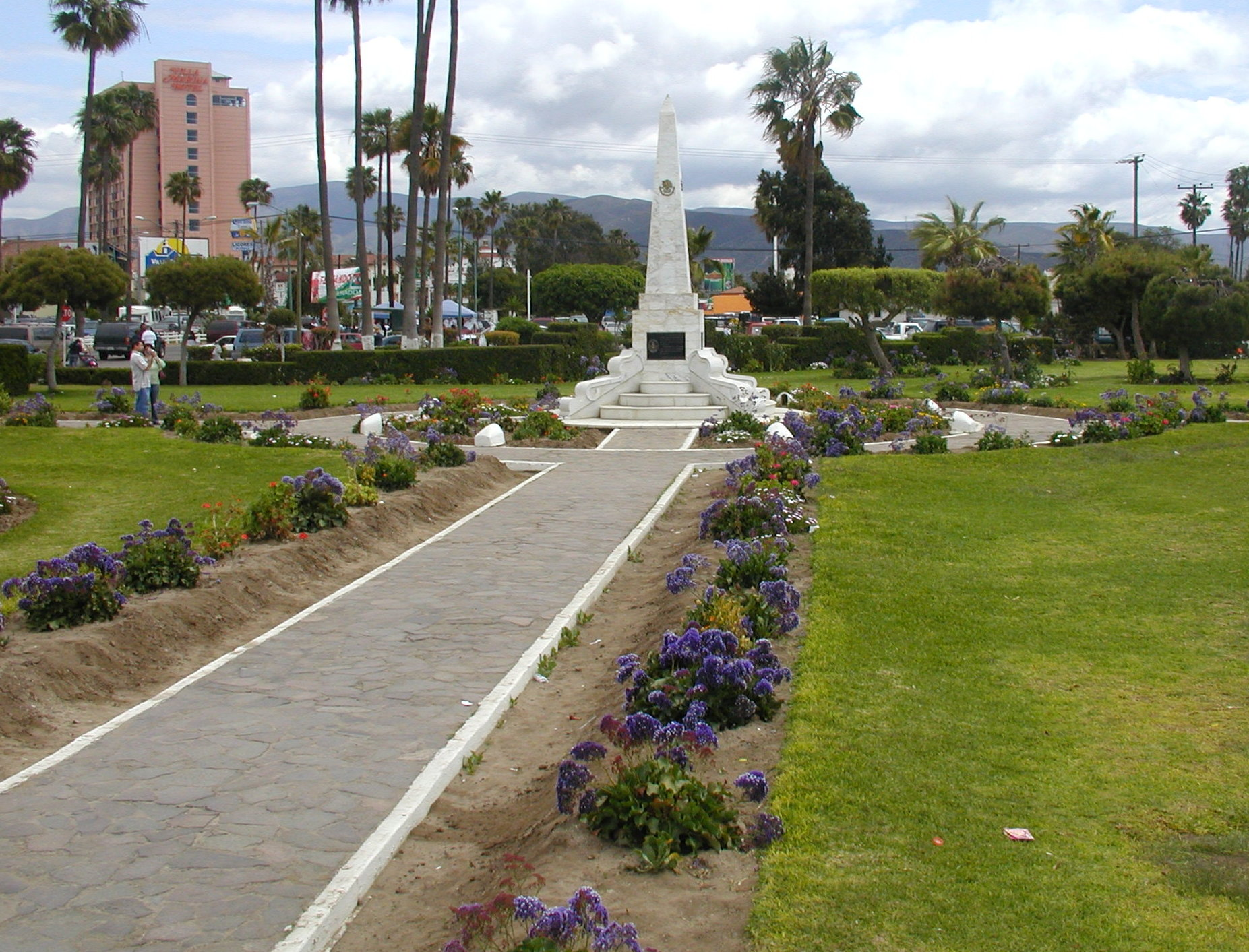
Garden in downtown Ensenada.

The following higher education institutions are based in Ensenada.

- Autonomous University of Baja California, Ensenada (UABC)
- Center of Nanociences and Nanotecnology National Autonomous University of Mexico (CNyN-UNAM)
- Centro de Enseñanza Técnica y Superior (CETYS), Ensenada
- Institute of Astronomy, National Autonomous University of Mexico (IA-UNAM) IAUNAM-E
- Ensenada Center for Scientific Research and Higher Education (CICESE)
- Institute for Oceanologic Research (IIO)
- Catholic University - Technological Baja California, Ensenada (TBC)
- Technological Institute of Ensenada (ITE)
- Universidad Del Noroccidente de Latinoamerica (UNDL)
- Xochicalco University, Ensenada
- Iuniversi, Ensenada

With UNAM's research headquarters, the Marine Sciences Department of the UABC and the CICESE scientific institute in town, Ensenada boasts the highest concentration of scientists and science students in all of Latin America, chiefly in the fields of astronomy, physics, biology, geology and oceanography. Fittingly, Ensenada has been coined the City Of Science. Ensenada's four main institutions have a dominant focus on marine and agricultural biotechnology, nanoscience and nanotechnology, information and communication technologies, oceanography and marine science, optics and applied physics, and economic development.

== Culture ==
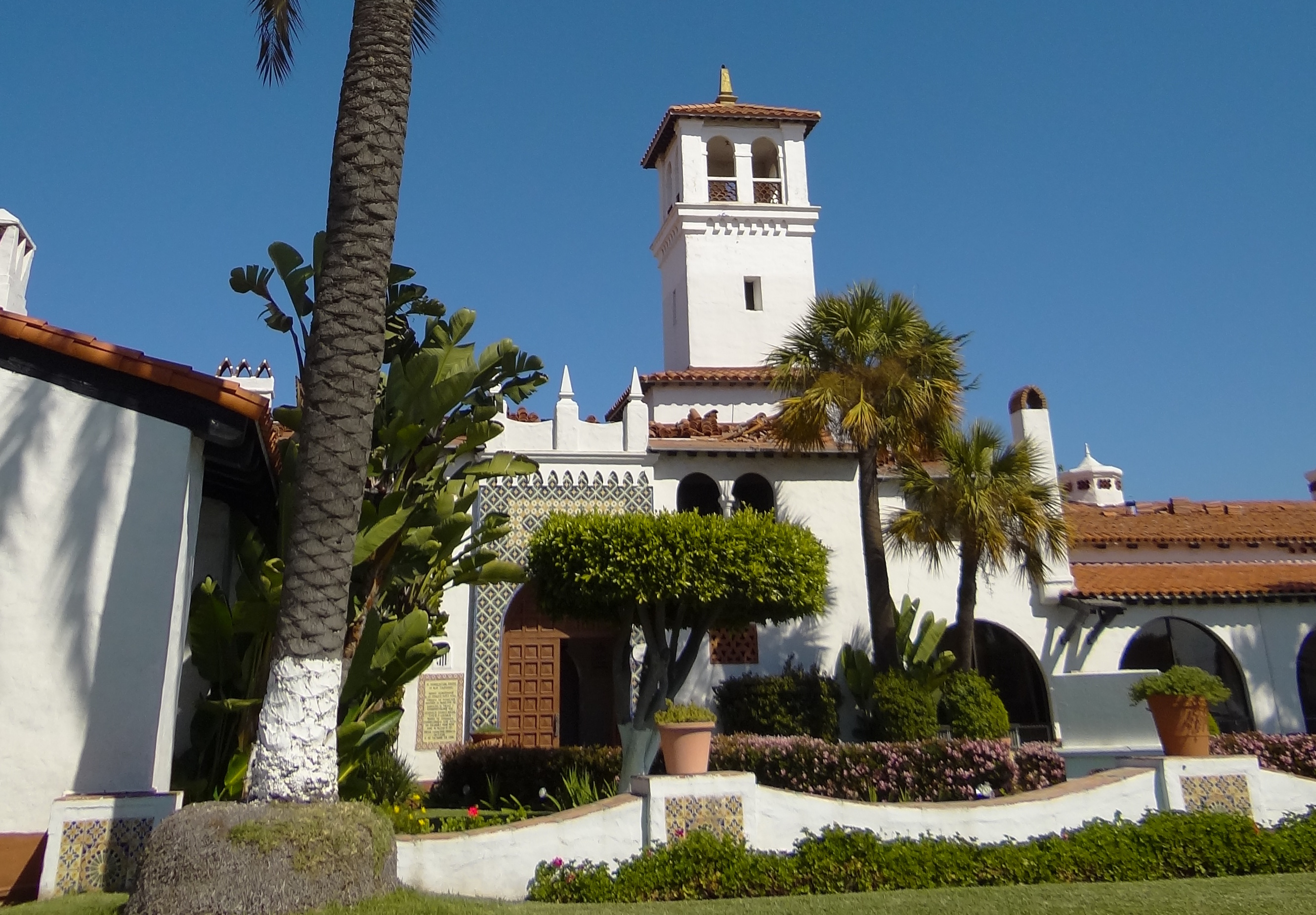
The historic Hotel Riviera del Pacífico is today a cultural center.

Ensenada's diversity as a city is in part attributed to Spanish, Russian, and American influences. Spanish missionaries and Russian settlers began the growth of the wine industry in the city. Reminiscent of this time period are Russian museums in the city.

The city is known for its festivities and laid-back atmosphere, the city hosts many events including the Wine Harvest Festival (Fiestas de la Vendimia) and Ensenada Carnaval. The Wine Harvest Festival celebrates the wine harvest season and in the city and nearby Guadalupe Valley, a series of events takes place.

Typical food in Ensenada consists of fish tacos, shrimp tacos, and ceviche. These dishes are usually accompanied by avocado and salsa. Another dish characteristic of the port city is carpaccio. The city's Mediterranean climate allows for the cultivation of grapes and olives, which in turn make wine and olive oil, respectively. Development of such foods complement Spanish, Italian, French, and Mexican dishes in Ensenada.

== Sports ==
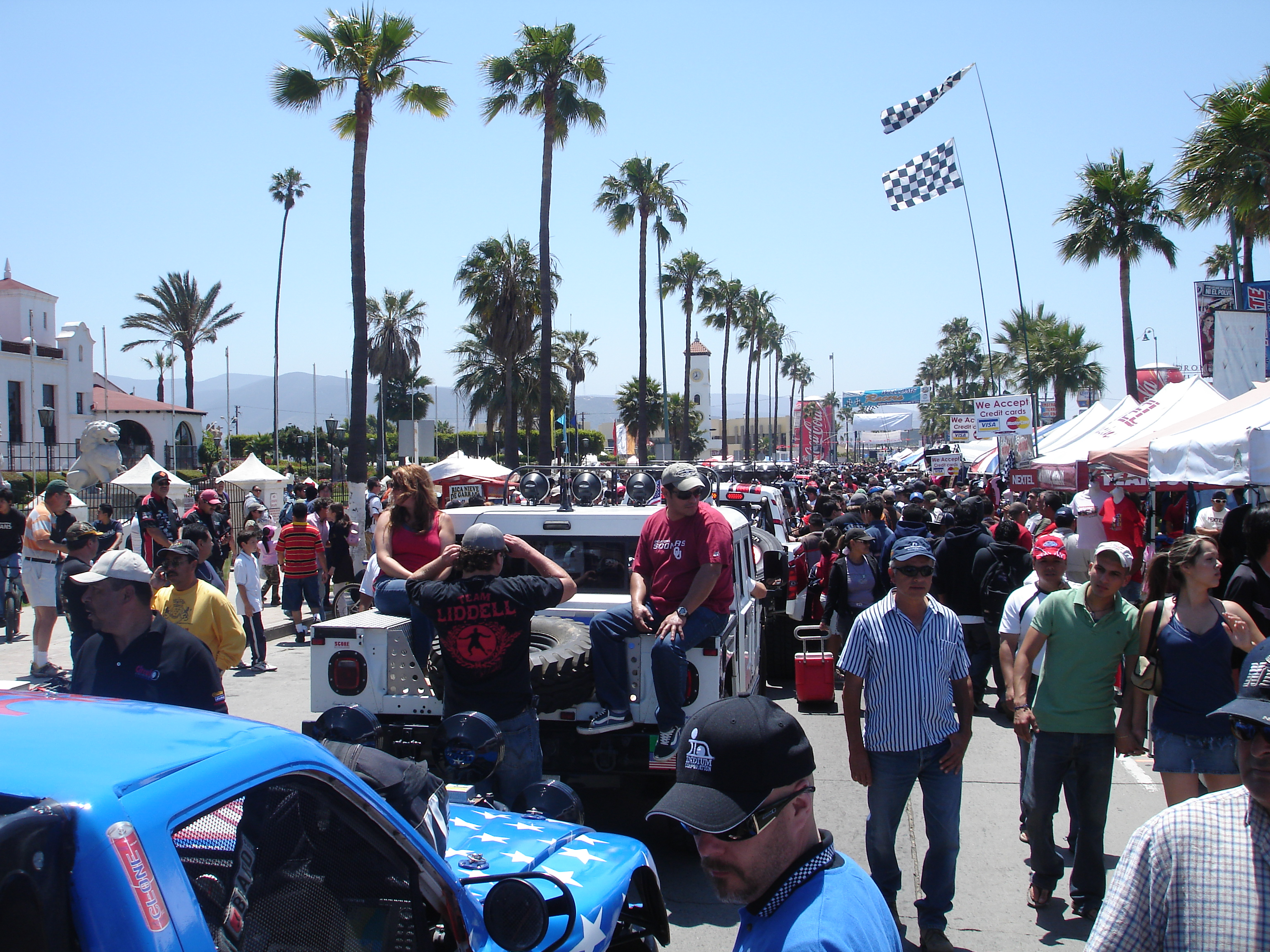
Baja 500 in 2008

Ensenada maintains no professional sports teams in association football, basketball, or baseball, but is known for its water sports. The city has sports fishing venues, and swells that are known for drawing professional surfers.

A baseball team, the Marineros de Ensenada, play in the Liga Norte de México and have won five championships (2010, 2012, 2017, 2018, 2022).

In addition to its watersports scene, the city is known for a place of biking, both cycling and motorsport varieties. The 80 kilometres (50 mi) Rosarito-Ensenada bike race ends in the city. The Baja 500, which starts and ends in the city, and Baja 1000 – both races that take their names from their distance in miles – are motorsport races that begin in the city.

It is also the birthplace of the tennis player Raúl Ramírez and pro cyclist Isaac del Toro of UAE Team Emirates.

== Media ==
Ensenada is served by three major newspapers. These are El Vigía, El Mexicano, and the Gringo Gazette North All of which cover local news, sports, business, jobs, and community events, though the Gringo Gazette is the dominant paper that publishes in the English-language. Since the 2013 La Jornada and El Frontera newspapers began to be distributed in the city. Also there are other options exclusively on-line as Ensenada.net, El Septentrión and Plex.

== Transportation ==
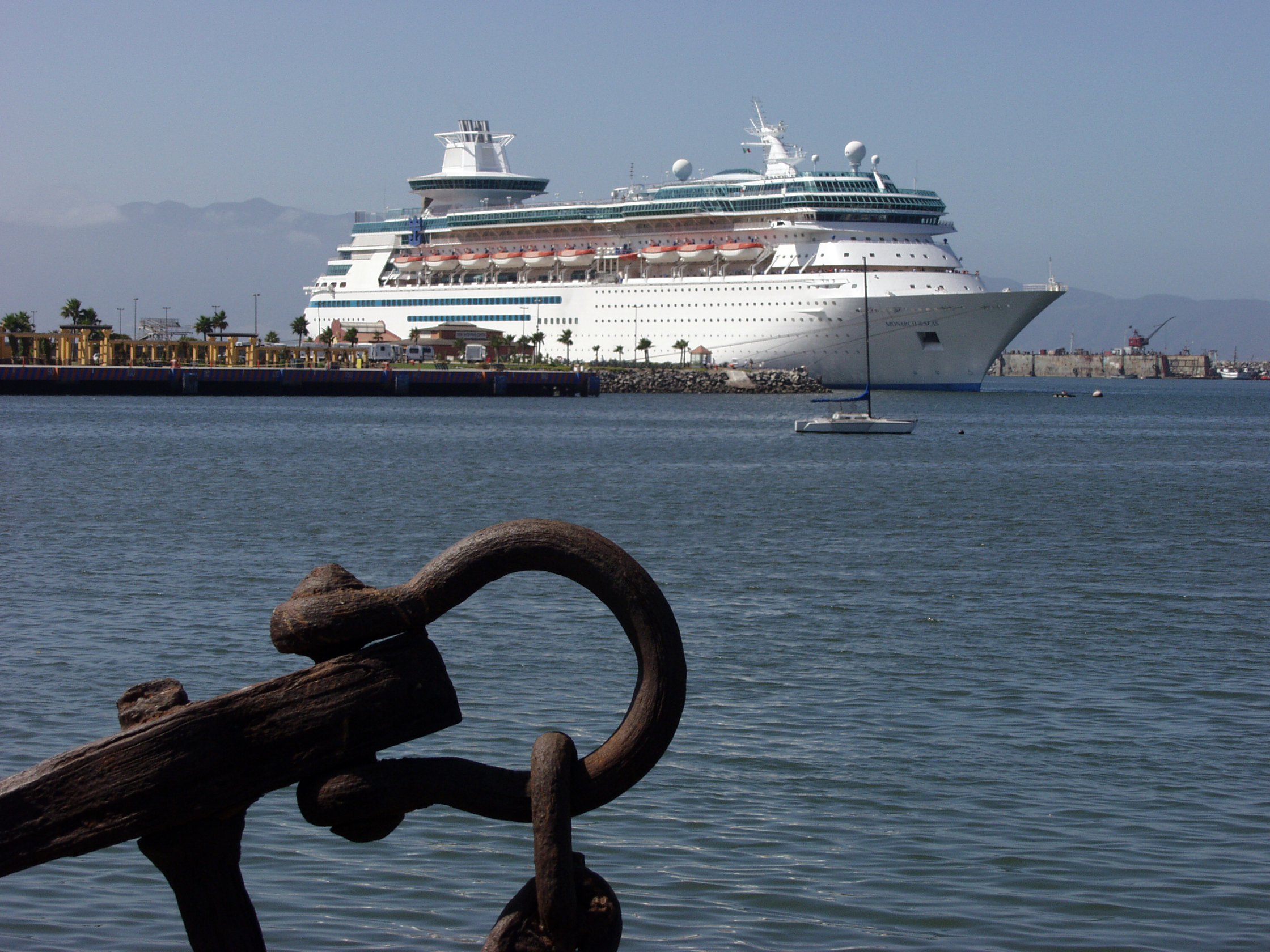
The Port of Ensenada is a popular stop for cruise ships on the Pacific.

The city lies at a crossroads of major federal highways on the peninsula that lead to the northern centers of Los Angeles, San Diego, and Mexicali and south to Cabo San Lucas and La Paz. The junction occurs at the meeting of Federal Highway 1 and Federal Highway 3. The main roads of the city include Bahia de La Paz and Lázaro Cárdenas, northwest bound, and southeast bound roads.

=== Ports and marinas ===
The Port of Ensenada is an international deepwater port and the city's major water port. It maintains commercial, industrial, and tourist terminals.

In addition to the port, the coast around Bahia de Todos Santos is dotted with numerous marinas, including Marina Baja Fiesta, Marina Cruiseport Village, Marina Coral, and Marina Baja Naval with docking facilities for pleasure craft and commercial and sport fishing vessels. In order to comply with United States cabotage laws, many cruise ships operating between Pacific ports in the U.S. call at Ensenada en route.

=== Airport ===
The city is served by Ensenada Airport, an official port of entry into Mexico. However, the airport only provides flights to limited destinations. The nearest international airport is Tijuana International Airport, which is located 112 kilometres (70 mi) north of Ensenada.

== In popular culture ==
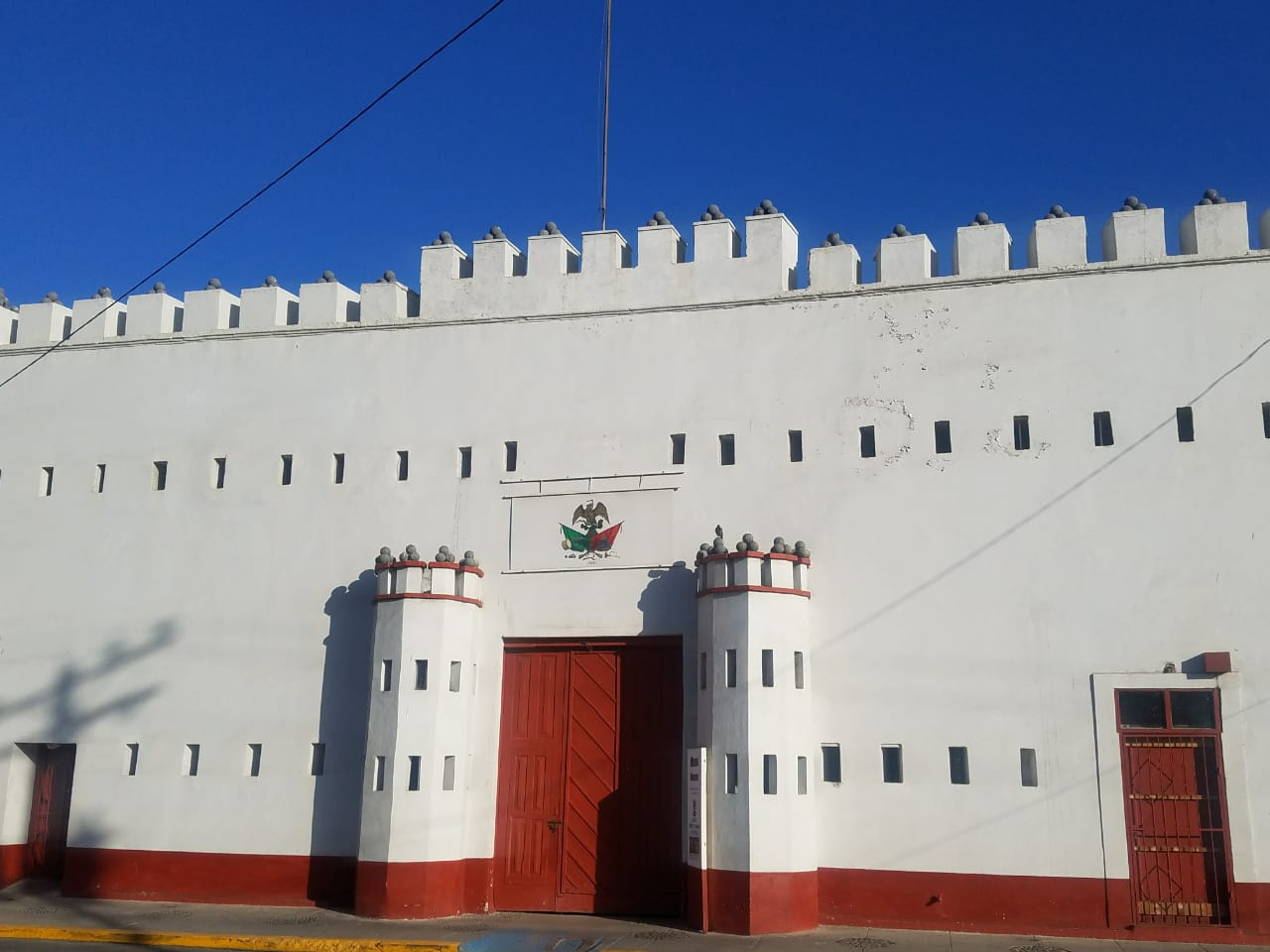
The historic Mexican Army barracks.

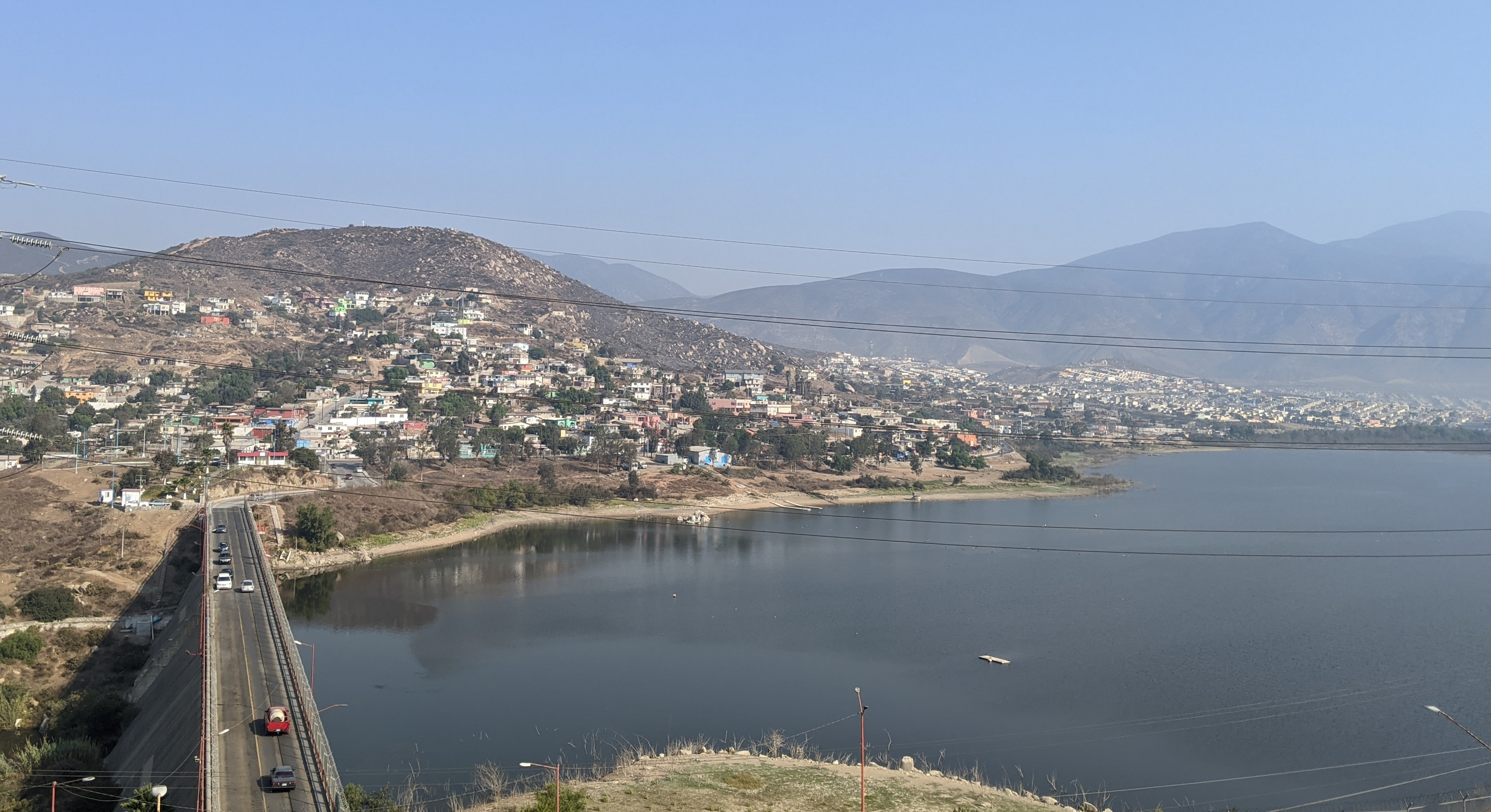
López Zamora reservoir.

- A Fender manufacturing plant is located in Ensenada.
- The city is the setting of a song by Neil Diamond titled "In Ensenada" on the album Heartlight.
- Lyle Lovett titled his 1996 album The Road to Ensenada as a reference to the spectacular 100 km (62 mi) coastal toll road between Tijuana and Ensenada.
- Warren Zevon mentions Ensenada in his song "Carmelita".
- The Hollywood-based British actor Nigel Bruce, best remembered for his portrayal of Doctor Watson opposite Basil Rathbone's Sherlock Holmes, was born in Ensenada in 1895 while his parents were on holiday in the city.
- Ween mentions Ensenada in the song "Bananas and Blow".
- Actor Brandon Lee and his girlfriend were due to be married in Ensenada on April 17, 1993, but Lee died while filming The Crow.
- In an episode of Mister Ed, Ed tries to convince his master Wilbur to take him to Ensenada on vacation and Wilbur tries to convince his wife.
- The first episode of TV series Simon & Simon, "Details at Eleven", was partially filmed in Ensenada at Ruiz Avenue.
- In the South Park episode "Probably", Kenny is hit by a bus that arrives in Ensenada. When he phones home Cartman believes Kenny is calling from hell and mistakenly thinks a description of Ensenada is a description of Hell.
- In a 2006 episode of The O.C., Ryan Atwood (Ben McKenzie) and Seth Cohen (Adam Brody) go to Ensenada in search of the man who killed their friend.
- Barbara Stanwyck and family head to Ensenada for a fishing and camping trip in the 1953 thriller Jeopardy.
- In 2025, the band Sublime released the single "Ensenada", named after the city.

== International relations ==
=== Sister cities ===
Ensenada has three sister cities as designated by Sister Cities International, including relations formalized between other cities.

City	State	Country
Oceanside	California	United States
Parlier	California	United States
Redondo Beach	California	United States
Riverside	California	United States
Montebello	California	United States
