= Autonomous University of Baja California, Ensenada =

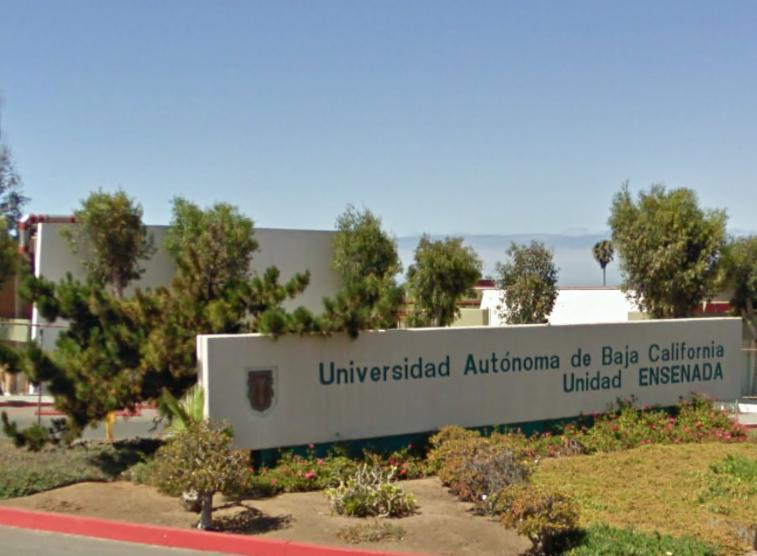
- UABC, Ensenada
- Location: 31.86444°N 116.66665°W
- Website: http://www.ens.uabc.mx/

The Autonomous University of Baja California, Ensenada is a public research university campus located in Ensenada, Baja California. The branch under the Autonomous University of Baja California maintains two sub-campuses, or extensions, in Valle Dorado and San Quintin.

The Ensenada campus is known for being the oceanographic research center in Mexico with its College of Marine science and its Institute for Oceanographic Research, which publishes its own international research journal. It is also located across the Ensenada Center for Scientific Research and Higher Education (CICESE). The Ensenada-Tijuana Highway separates the Ensenada campus and the CICESE.
