= Ensenada shootout =

2023 cartel gunfight in Mexico

On 20 May 2023, a shootout occurred in Ensenada, Baja California, Mexico. It occurred at 2:18pm at an off-road vehicle rally in the San Vicente area of the city. Ten people were killed and another ten wounded. The perpetrators appear to have been members of the Jalisco New Generation Cartel and the Sinaloa Cartel.

On 23 May, Ricardo Iván Carpio Sánchez, the Baja California attorney general, announced that three suspects had been detained in connection to the shooting.
