= Hotel Riviera del Pacífico =

Historic hotel in Ensenada, Baja California

Coordinates: 31.8585°N 116.6193°W

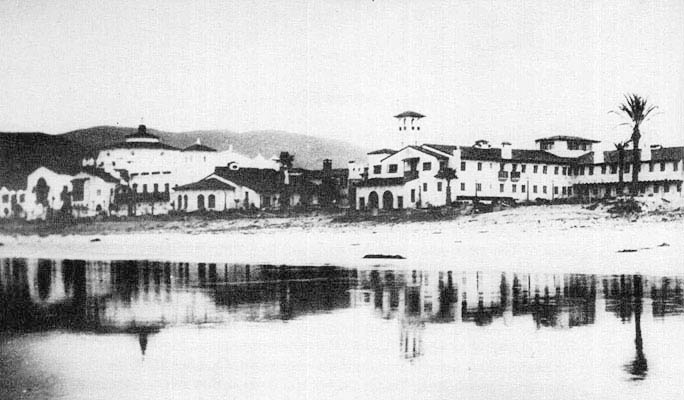
The hotel at its opening in 1930

The Hotel Riviera del Pacífico was a resort hotel in Ensenada, Baja California, Mexico. It was one of the most prestigious and luxurious hotels in Mexico;. Opened with great fanfare in 1930, was not a real success until the early 1950s. It closed in 1964 and was converted to a local cultural center in 1978.

== History ==
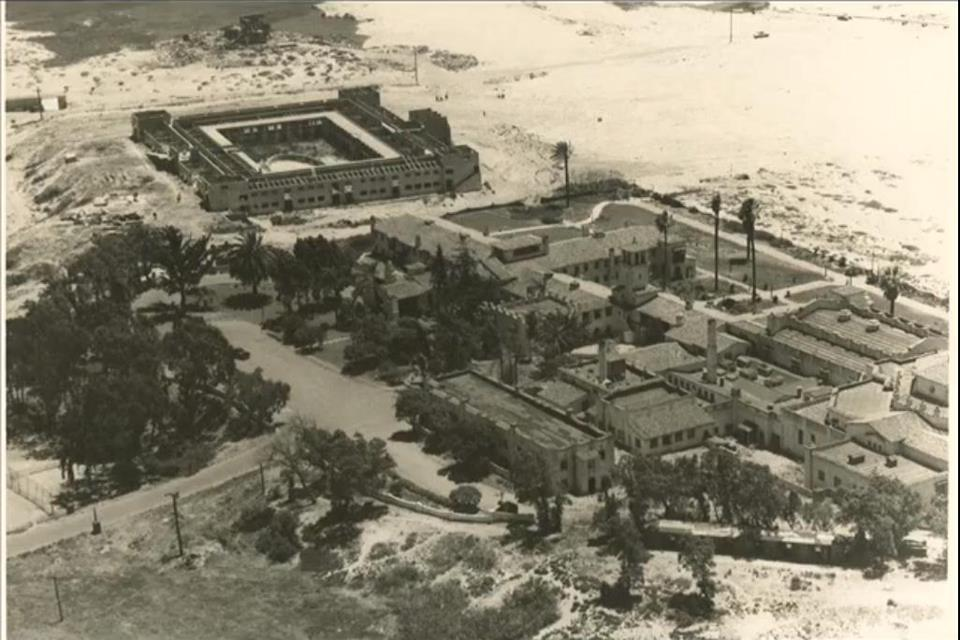
Rear of the hotel in 1930

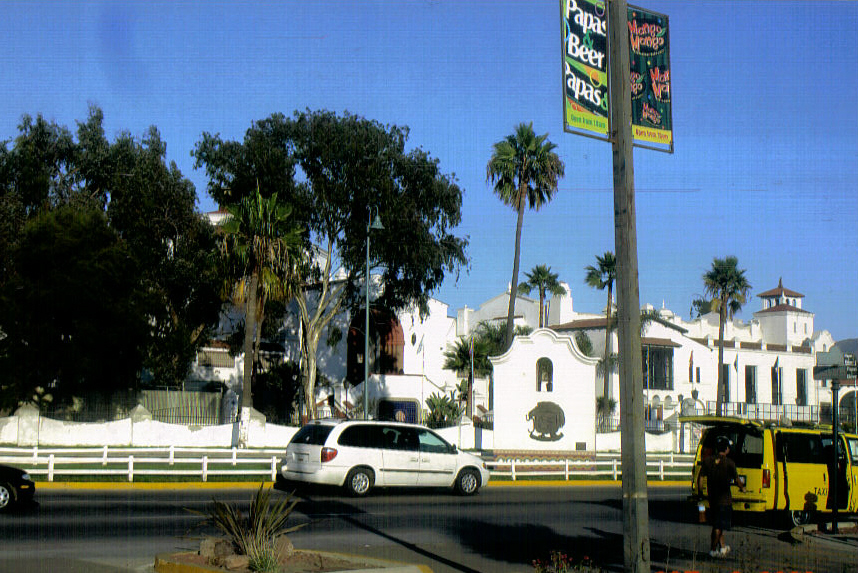
Hotel Riviera del Pacifico, now the Centro Social, Cívico y Cultural de Ensenada (Riviera del Pacifico Cultural and Convention Center)

=== Origins ===
Prohibition sent Americans south of the border, in search of entertainment and alcohol. First Tijuana, then Rosarito, and finally Ensenada were developed as tourist destinations.

The Ensenada Beach Club, S.A. was formed with the goal to build a resort in Ensenada. After the Club dissolved in 1926, a number of its members joined a new company, Club Internationale, S.A., to continue the project, initially called the Hotel Playa de Ensenada (Ensenada Beach Hotel). Architect Gordon F. Mayer was hired to design the hotel; Alfredo Ramos Martínez was hired to do its murals. The Playa Ensenada Hotel and Casino opened on October 31, 1930 with spectacular festivities, including the Xavier Cugat band, under the de facto management of boxer Jack Dempsey.

=== Decline ===
The hotel was never a financial success, however, partly because the road from the United States was poor, and the end of Prohibition proved fatal. The hotel only ever operated intermittently, and was put to military use during the Second World War.

=== Revival and final closure ===
After the end of the War, one of the original shareholders, Jerome Utley of Detroit, by then an old man and the only remaining shareholder, gave the hotel to a young lady with whom he was in love, Marjorie King Plant. Plant ran the hotel successfully with her Mexican lawyer and husband, Alfonso Rocha, changing its name to Hotel Riviera del Pacífico. Utley had been led to believe that Plant's marriage to Rocha was a "white marriage," that is a marriage of convenience serving only to give Plant the Mexican citizenship she needed to run the hotel, and when he discovered that this was not the case, he pursued Plant and then Rocha with court cases, leading first to Plant's leaving the hotel for the United States and then to Rocha's absconding from the hotel in 1956 to avoid a judgment against him. At this point the hotel was taken over by the Mexican government, which closed and partly demolished it in 1964.

=== Current status ===
Partly rebuilt in 1978, the hotel was reopened as the Centro Social, Cívico y Cultural de Ensenada. This includes an open-air theater, a historical museum, a cantina, and a number of rooms used for a variety of functions.

== The Margarita ==
The Margarita is claimed to have been invented in several different places and at several different times. One claim is that it was invented at the Hotel Riviera del Pacífico for Marjorie King Plant at the time when she was the joint owner. Other versions refer to Marjorie King, an actress, and some move the location from Ensenada to Tijuana. Margarita is a Spanish version of the name Marjorie.

According to an article in the Los Angeles Times, the Margarita was invented in the 1940s by Carlos Daniel "Danny" Herrera.

== See also ==
- List of hotels in Mexico
- List of companies of Mexico
