= Jerome Utley =

American baseball player-coach (1881–1959)

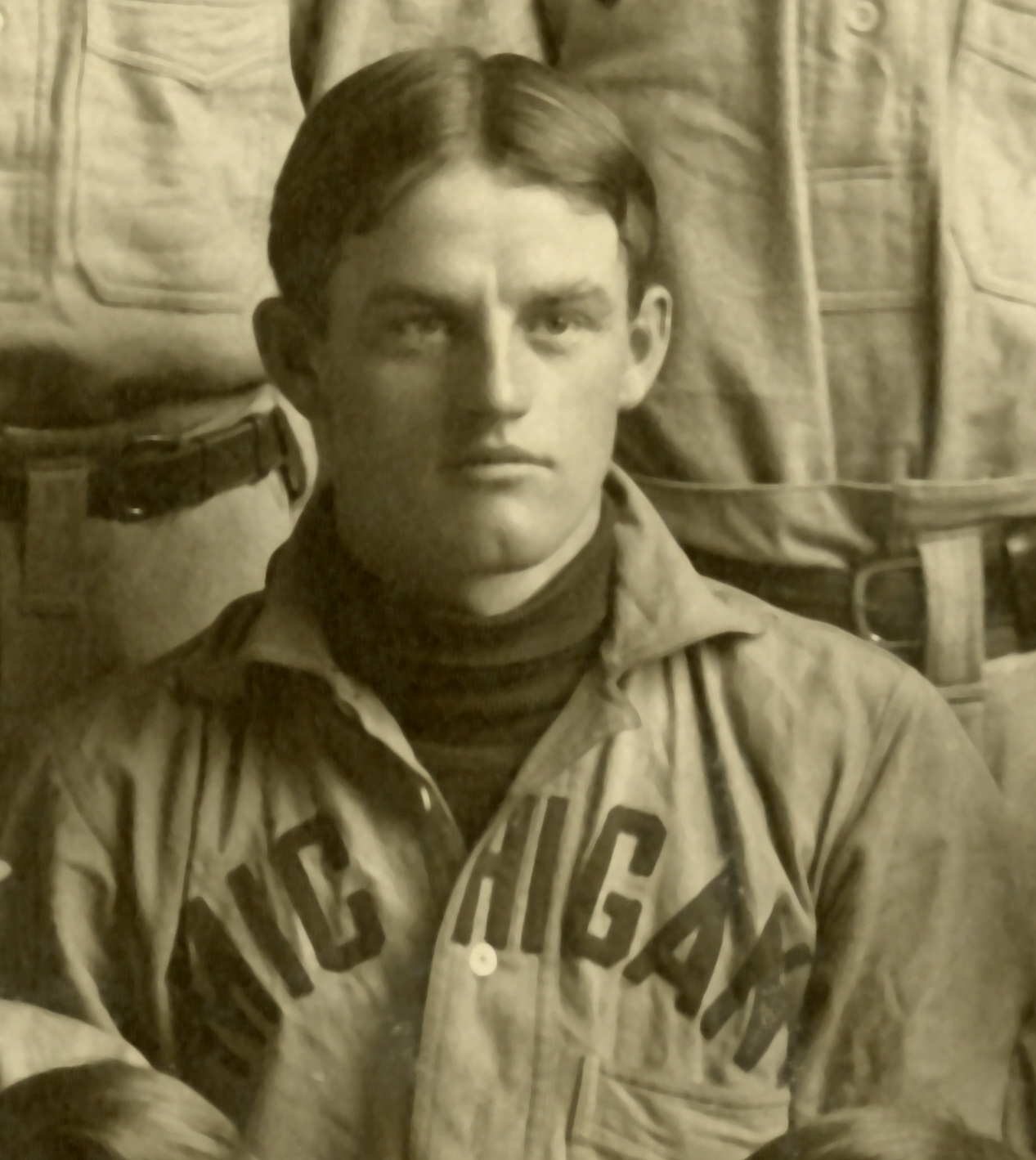
- Utley, 1903
- Born: January 7, 1881; Stanton, Michigan, U.S.
- Died: April 24, 1959 (aged 78); Detroit, Michigan, U.S.
- Occupations: Baseball player and coach

Jerome Adams Utley (January 7, 1881 – April 24, 1959) was an American baseball player and coach, contracting engineer, hotelier and boxing promoter. He played and coached college baseball for the Michigan Wolverines baseball team in the early 1900s. He also briefly coached and played minor league baseball from 1905 to 1906. After retiring from baseball, Utley had a successful career as a contracting engineer on building projects in Detroit. From 1931 to approximately 1948, he had an ownership interest in the Hotel Playa Ensenada, later renamed the Hotel Riviera del Pacífico, a luxury hotel in Baja California, Mexico. He also briefly had a partnership with Jack Dempsey as a boxing promoter which included promoting the 1933 heavyweight championship match between Max Schmeling and Max Baer.

== Early years ==
Utley was born in Stanton, Michigan, the son of Rev. Wells H. Utley and Emma (Adams) Utley. He attended Central High School in Detroit in approximately 1899.

== Baseball player and coach ==
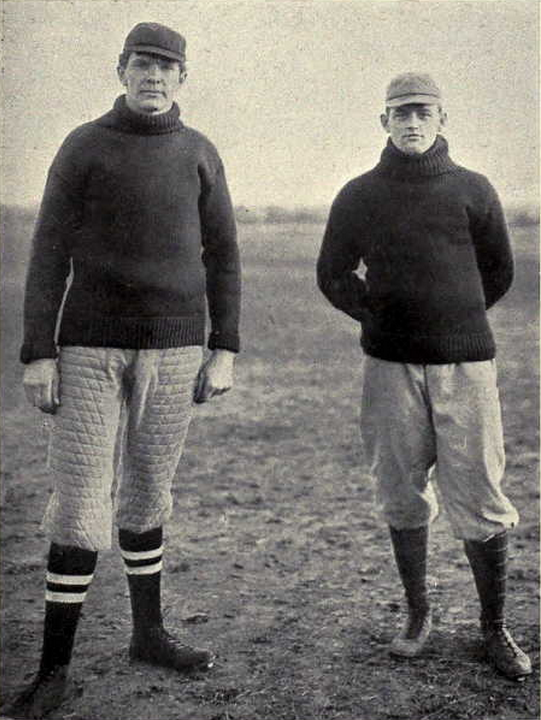
Michigan coach Skel Roach with captain Utley (right).

After graduating from high school, Utley entered the University of Michigan as an engineering student. He received a bachelor of science degree in mechanical engineering in 1903. While attending Michigan, he was a pitcher for the Michigan Wolverines baseball team from 1900 to 1903. After receiving his degree in 1903, Utley returned to Michigan as the head coach of the Michigan Wolverines baseball team in 1904. The Wolverines had a 10–5 record in Utley's only season as the head coach.

In August 1903, Utley moved to Michigan's Upper Peninsula to play for the Calumet baseball team and work as an engineer in one of the area's mines. In 1905, he was the manager of the Hancock Infants of the Copper Country Soo League. In 1906, he played minor league baseball for the Houghton Giants of the Northern-Copper Country League.

In 1907, Utley was hired as the baseball coach at Detroit College.

From 1908 to 1910, Utley was the star pitcher, and in 1909 the team captain, for the Detroit Athletic Club baseball team. He also returned to the mound in 1913 as a pitcher for the Euclids, a semi-pro baseball team in Detroit.

== Engineering career ==
Utley became a contracting engineer in Detroit. As of September 1918, he was self-employed as an engineer with an office at the Penobscot Building in downtown Detroit. In his 1922 history of Detroit, Clarence Burton included a profile of Utley, noting: "Jerome A. Utley, a contracting engineer of Detroit who has executed many important contracts, has had broad experience in this line of work and his standing in engineering circles of the city is an enviable one. ... Industry is the key which has unlocked for Mr. Utley the portals of success and thoroughness and diligence have characterized all of his work. His professional standing is of the highest and through his labors he has contributed in substantial measure to the development and improvement of Detroit, being recognized as a most progressive and public-spirited citizen, whose influence is at all times on the side of advancement and improvement."

Census records indicate he was unmarried and living in Detroit with his brother Stuart and sister Beatrice in 1910 and with his sister Beatrice Utley in 1920 and 1930.

Utley was a member of the First Congregational Church, a Mason, and a member of the Detroit Athletic Club.

== Hotel Playa Ensenada ==
In his later years, Utley was best known for his role as the owner of the Hotel Playa Ensenada, later renamed the Hotel Riviera del Pacífico. The hotel was a luxury resort built in the late 1920s during Prohibition, included a casino, and was located approximately 75 miles south of Tijuana. Jack Dempsey, the world heavyweight boxing champion, was one of the original owners, and guests included Marion Davies, William Randolph Hearst, Johnny Weissmuller and Myrna Loy. By 1931, the hotel's debt burden had become a problem, and Utley made a substantial investment in the hotel. Following Utley's investment, the hotel's business dropped off, as Prohibition was repealed in the United States and gambling was outlawed in Mexico. Utley became the hotel's principal owner in the 1930s, and the hotel was closed in 1938.

Utley also formed a brief partnership with Dempsey to promote boxing matches. Dempsey and Utley were the promoters of the June 1933 heavyweight championship match between Max Schmeling and Max Baer.

During World War II, the hotel was used as a military headquarters to guard against a Japanese attack on the United States through Baja California. After the war, Utley re-opened the hotel. Described as "a seventy-year-old bachelor," Utley fell in love with Marjorie King Plant, described as "an attractive blond woman in her early forties." Utley gave the hotel to Plant in approximately 1948, but later learned that she had married a Mexican lawyer. Utley filed a lawsuit against Plant, and she sold her interest in the hotel and returned to California. Utley died in 1959.
