= Ensenada Center for Scientific Research and Higher Education =

Public research center in Ensenada, Mexico

Center for Scientific Research and Higher Education at Ensenada
- Centro de Investigación Científica y de Educación Superior de Ensenada, CICESE
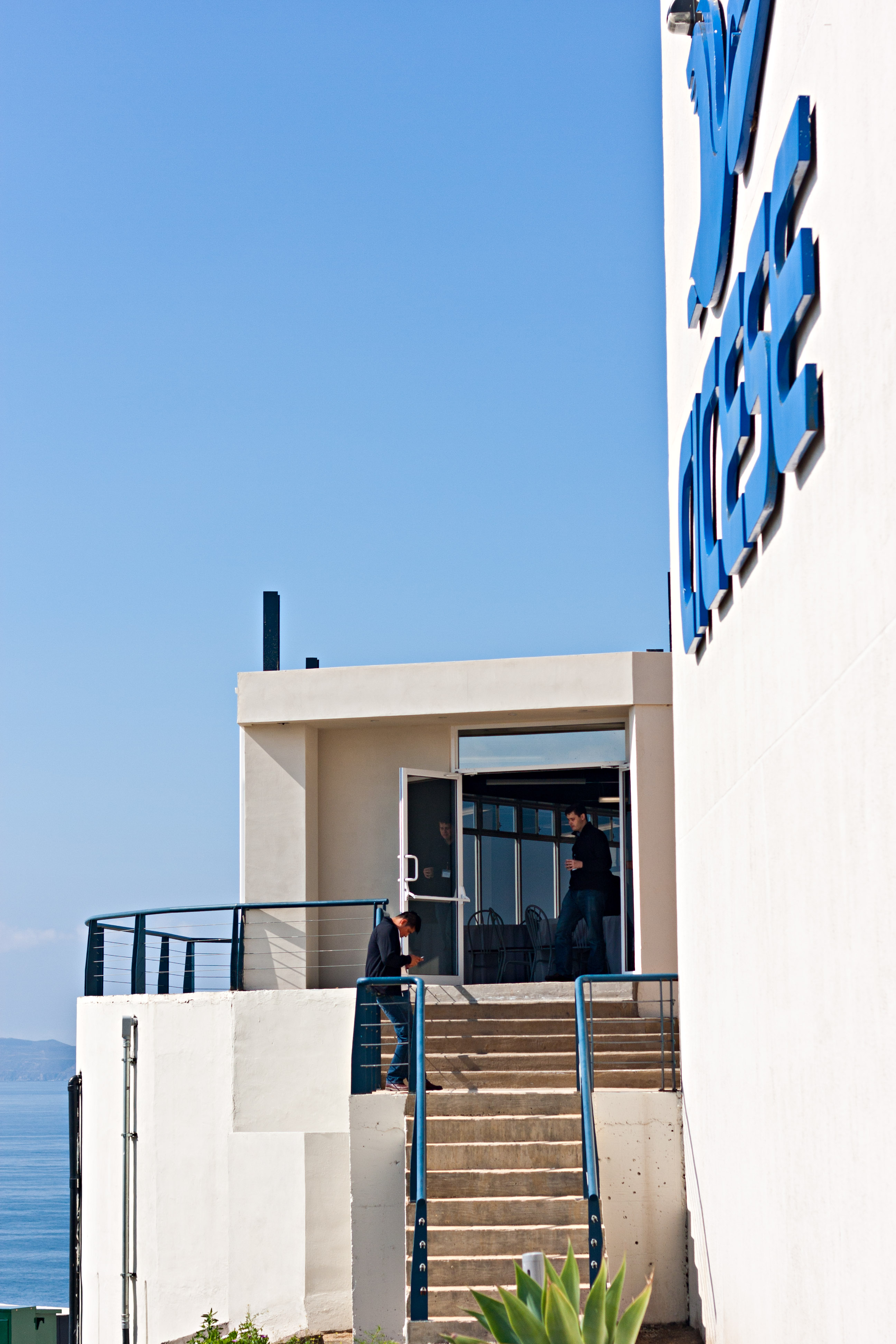
- Type: Public university and research center
- Established: 1973
- Affiliations: ANUIES
- Director: David Covarrubias Rosales
- Location: Ensenada, Baja California, Mexico
- Website: www.cicese.edu.mx

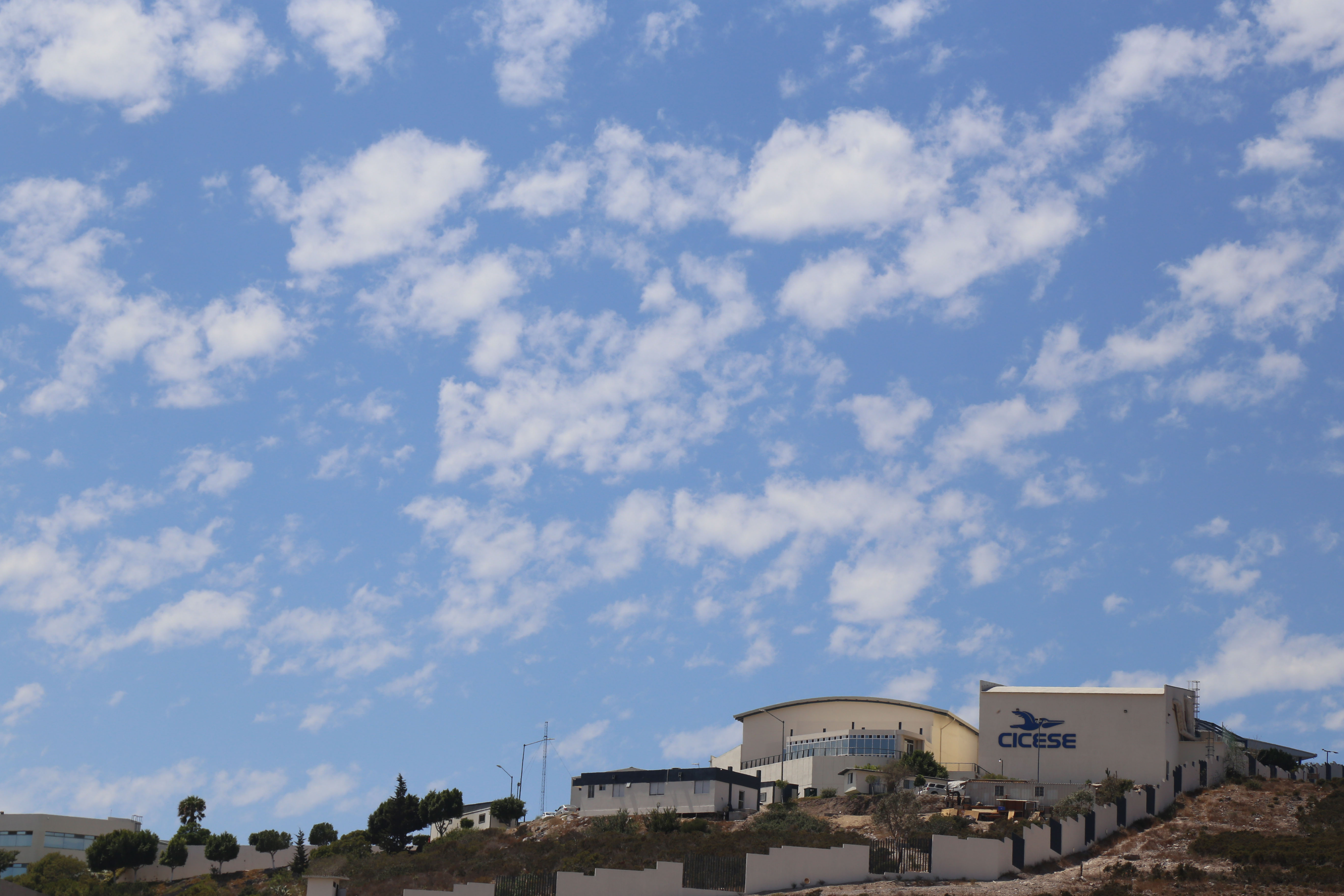
CICESE

The Center for Scientific Research and Higher Education at Ensenada (in Spanish: Centro de Investigación Científica y de Educación Superior de Ensenada, CICESE) is a public research center sponsored by the National Council for Science and Technology of Mexico (CONACYT) in the city of Ensenada, Baja California, and specialized in Earth Sciences, Oceanography, Life Sciences and Applied Physics.

Its facilities include eight buildings which house laboratories, classrooms, a specialized library, supercomputing equipment, connection to Internet 2, the oceanographic vessel Alpha Helix, and valuable seismological and oceanographic instrumentation and a library that holds more than 40,000 volumes.

== History ==
The center was founded in 1973 by the Mexican federal government, which aimed to create a research institution outside Mexico City (where 80% of Mexico's scientific and technical research was performed at the time). At the time, most of the research concerning the Baja California Peninsula took place at the Scripps Institution of Oceanography in La Jolla, California. The team to found the institution was led by Raúl N. Ordarza, Emmanuel Méndez Palma and Remigio Valdés of CONACYT; Arcadio Poveda and Félix Córdoba of the National Autonomous University of Mexico and Nicolás Grijalva of the Autonomous University of Baja California's School of Marine Studies and Math professor at Scripps.

The institution formed part of the design group to produce the first satellite 100% designed and built in Mexico. The other major partners were the National Autonomous University of Mexico and the National Polytechnic Institute.

== Organization ==
CICESE is organized in four divisions and fifteen academic departments. The four divisions are:

- Experimental and applied biology;
- Earth sciences;
- Applied physics;
- Oceanology.

Governance is organized in one director general and four support directors. The current director general is Dr. David Covarrubias Rosales.

== Postgraduate studies ==
CICESE offers postgraduate studies (Masters and PhD degrees) in the following areas:

- Aquaculture
- Computer Science
- Earth Sciences
- Life Science
- Marine Ecology
- Microbiology
- Electronics and Telecommunications
- Nanosciencies
- Physical Oceanography
- Optics

== Other campus ==
In 1996 CICESE founded its first external campus in La Paz, Baja California Sur. The second one, in Monterrey, Nuevo Leon, was created in 2001.

== Ranking ==
CICESE ranks 8th among research centers in Mexico, and 34th in Latin America.

== See also ==
- CONACYT
- CIO
- INAOE
- CINVESTAV
- UABC
- UNAM
