= Royal Caribbean =

Royal Caribbean may refer to:

- Royal Caribbean International (previously Royal Caribbean Cruise Line), a cruise line brand
- Royal Caribbean Group, a cruise holding company that owns Royal Caribbean International along with several other cruise lines
