= Rimac Technology =

Croatian automotive technology company

- Type: Subsidiary
- Industry: Automotive, Electric vehicle components
- Founded: 2021; 5 years ago (spun off from Rimac Automobili)
- Founder: Mate Rimac
- Headquarters: Sveta Nedelja, Croatia
- Products: Battery systems, e-Axles, Electronic control units
- Number of employees: 1,000+
- Parent: Rimac Group
- Website: rimac-technology.com

Rimac Technology is a Croatian Automotive industry technology company and Tier 1 supplier specializing in electric vehicle components. A wholly owned subsidiary of Rimac Group, the company designs and manufactures battery systems, e-axles, and electronic control units for premium automotive manufacturers worldwide.

== History ==
Rimac Technology originated as the technology division of Rimac Automobili, the electric hypercar manufacturer founded by Mate Rimac in 2009. Following the 2021 formation of Bugatti Rimac, a joint venture between Rimac (55%) and Porsche (45%)—Rimac Technology was established as an independent entity under the Rimac Group corporate structure to continue supplying electrification technology to external clients.

The company is headquartered in Sveta Nedelja, Zagreb County, Croatia, with an additional R&D office in Warwick, United Kingdom.

== Rimac Campus ==
The Rimac Campus is the global headquarters and primary production facility of the Rimac Group, located in Kerestinec in the municipality of Sveta Nedelja, approximately 16 kilometres west of Zagreb city centre. Construction began in October 2021 and the facility became fully operational in 2024.

The campus was designed by Croatian architectural firm 3LHD. The site covers 200,000 square metres, with a total investment exceeding €200 million, making it one of the largest construction projects of its kind in Europe at the time of completion. The production facility alone spans over 75,000 square metres and features a continuous profiled metal façade stretching one kilometre in length. The campus was designed without perimeter fencing, making it accessible to members of the public.

Approximately 70 per cent of the campus capacity is dedicated to Rimac Technology, primarily housing large-scale production lines for battery systems and electric drive units destined for global automotive manufacturers. The remainder is occupied by Bugatti Rimac for hypercar development and assembly. The campus hosts assembly of the Rimac Nevera as well as development and production work for the Bugatti Tourbillon.

== Products and clients ==
Rimac Technology supplies electrification technologies to global OEMs, including high-voltage battery packs, e-axle drive units, and electronic control units. Notable clients include Porsche, Hyundai, Aston Martin, Koenigsegg, and Automobili Pininfarina.

In 2024, Rimac Technology announced a long-term partnership with BMW to co-develop and co-produce high-voltage battery technology for future electric vehicles. The collaboration was described by Automotive Dive as the "largest and most ambitious project [the company has undertaken] yet."

In 2025, the company unveiled next-generation solid-state battery technology and advanced e-axle systems at IAA Mobility in Munich, with the solid-state batteries promising up to 30 percent greater energy density.

== Leadership ==
Rimac Technology was founded by Mate Rimac, who served as its chief executive officer from the company's establishment as an independent entity. In February 2026, Rimac Technology announced a leadership transition, with Nurdin Pitarević, who had served as chief operating officer, appointed as chief executive officer. Marko Brkljačić, formerly deputy COO, assumed the role of chief operating officer.

Pitarević joined Rimac Technology from Continental and led the company through a period of operational expansion in his role as COO, overseeing the transition of multiple programmes into series production. As CEO, Pitarević is responsible for leading the company's strategic roadmap through 2030, encompassing advanced electrification technologies, digitalised operations, and the development of next-generation solid-state battery technology.

Mate Rimac continues to support the business in his role as President of the Rimac Group, while focusing primarily on Bugatti Rimac, where he serves as CEO.
