= Mate Rimac =

Entrepreneur in automotive industry (born 1988)

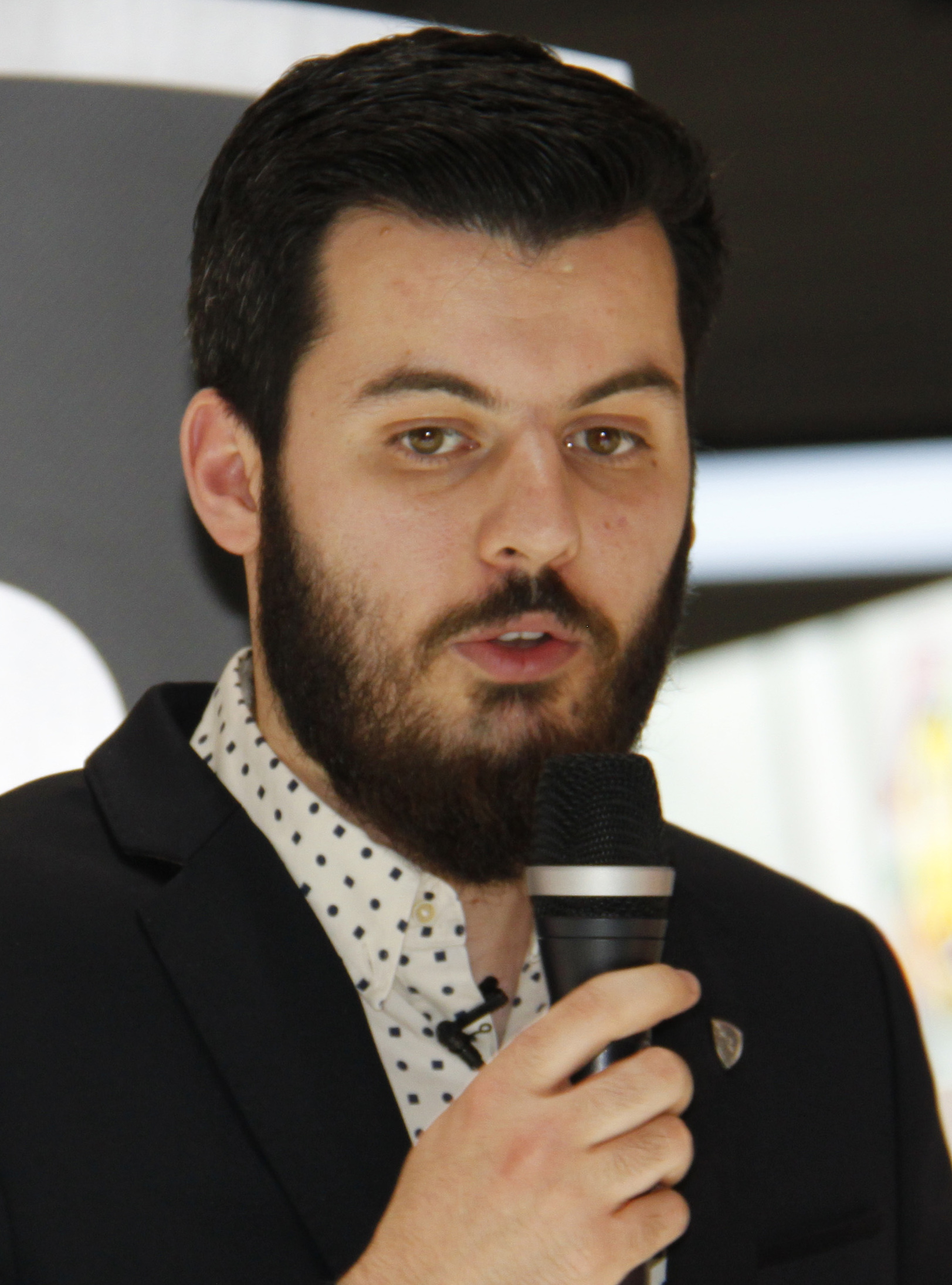
- Rimac in 2017
- Born: 12 February 1988 (age 38); Livno, SR Bosnia and Herzegovina, SFR Yugoslavia
- Education: VERN University of Applied Science
- Occupations: Entrepreneur; Corporate CEO
- Title: CEO of Bugatti Rimac
- Spouse: Katarina Lovrić (m. 2021)
- Father: Ivan Rimac
- Awards: Order of Danica Hrvatska

Mate Rimac (Croatian: [mǎːte rǐːmats]; born 12 February 1988) is an entrepreneur and engineer. He is the founder and CEO of the Rimac Group, a business which includes Bugatti Rimac – composed of the Bugatti Automobiles and Rimac Automobili brands – and Rimac Technology, a supplier of technology to automotive brands. He also founded Greyp Bikes, a high-tech eBike and eBike technology company which was taken over by Porsche AG and is now known as Porsche eBike Performance GmbH. According to Nedeljnik, as of December 2025, Rimac's estimated net worth was €1.74 billion, making him the second-richest individual in Croatia.

In his high school years, Rimac won local, national, and international competitions for electronics and innovation. At 19 years old, he started to convert a 1984 BMW 3 Series into an electric car in his garage. The vehicle broke several world records for electric cars. At the age of 23 in 2011, Rimac went on to create his first all-electric supercar, the Concept One.

His company, Rimac Automobili, went from its first employees in 2011 to more than 1,000 employees in 2020, with major investment from Porsche AG, Hyundai-Kia, and Camel Group. In addition to developing and manufacturing electric sports cars, Rimac provides electric vehicle technologies and systems for many brands in the auto industry. It is known to be working with in public or producing components for Porsche, Hyundai, Kia, Renault, Jaguar, Aston Martin, SEAT, Koenigsegg, and Automobili Pininfarina. Rimac's second car, designed, engineered, and built in-house, is the Nevera.

Rimac has previously turned down offers to move his business out of the country, stating that he aims bring automotive manufacturers to Croatia. Motor Trend has ranked Rimac ninth on their list of the biggest players in the auto industry, Forbes named Rimac one of the Top 30 Under 30, the 30 best entrepreneurs under the age of 30 of the world, in 2017. Rimac was named the Croatian Entrepreneur of the Year in 2017 by EY Hrvatska (Ernst & Young Croatia).

== Early life ==
Rimac was born in Livno, SR Bosnia and Herzegovina, SFR Yugoslavia (present-day Bosnia and Herzegovina) in 1988 to Zdenka and Ivan Rimac. The family temporarily moved to Frankfurt, Germany in 1991, when he was three years old, to escape the nascent Yugoslav Wars which had rendered the family's home region uninhabitable. The family lived in Germany until 2000, after which they moved to Croatia, settling in Samobor, where Rimac's father founded a real estate company.

Moving from Germany to Croatia, Rimac said that it was hard for him to adapt and keep up in school. He was bullied for having a Bosnian accent. However, Rimac was fascinated by cars and technology and was working in his parents' garage on his own projects. During high school, Rimac's teacher and later mentor, Ivan Vlainić, convinced him to participate at a local competition for electronics. Rimac did not have high hopes as he did not excel at school, but won the first prize. After that, Mate competed on a national level, where he also achieved top spot, which led him to represent Croatia in global competitions for electronics and innovation.

In 2005, Rimac built a device that replaced the computer keyboard and mouse with a glove, which he called the iGlove. Shortly after, Rimac invented a rear-view mirror system for avoiding a vehicle's blind spot, called Active Mirror System, which won an award at the IENA international trade fair 2006 in Nuremberg, Germany. At the age of age 17, Rimac applied for two international patents for his inventions. Rimac won awards in international competitions for electronics and innovation before turning 18, in South Korea, Germany, Belgium, Switzerland, Malaysia and Croatia. Rimac attended the VERN University of Applied Science from 2007. He obtained a bachelor's degree in Entrepreneurial Management in 2010.

Being fascinated by cars all his life and wanting to enter into the world of racing, Rimac bought a 1984 BMW E30 323i at the age of 18 in 2006 as that seemed to be the cheapest way to get into racing. After the gasoline engine exploded during one race, he decided to turn the car into an electric one, inspired by the innovations of his idol Nikola Tesla. His peers mocked him for racing with an electric car, for bringing a "washing machine" to the race track.

After many upgrades, and a total of seven different iterations where all of the key components of the car were replaced with Rimac's new developments, the car became faster, winning races and gaining attention. It soon drew attention to the benefits of electric power and Rimac's talents as an engineer, in addition to setting a number of world FIA and Guinness records. Seeing the potential in electric performance, Mate decided to found a company to build electric cars. Initially called VST Conversions (v=s/t being the formula for velocity), Rimac offered conversions of traditional vehicles to EVs. The company which would become Rimac Automobili was founded in September 2009, when Rimac was 21.

== Career ==
=== Rimac Automobili ===
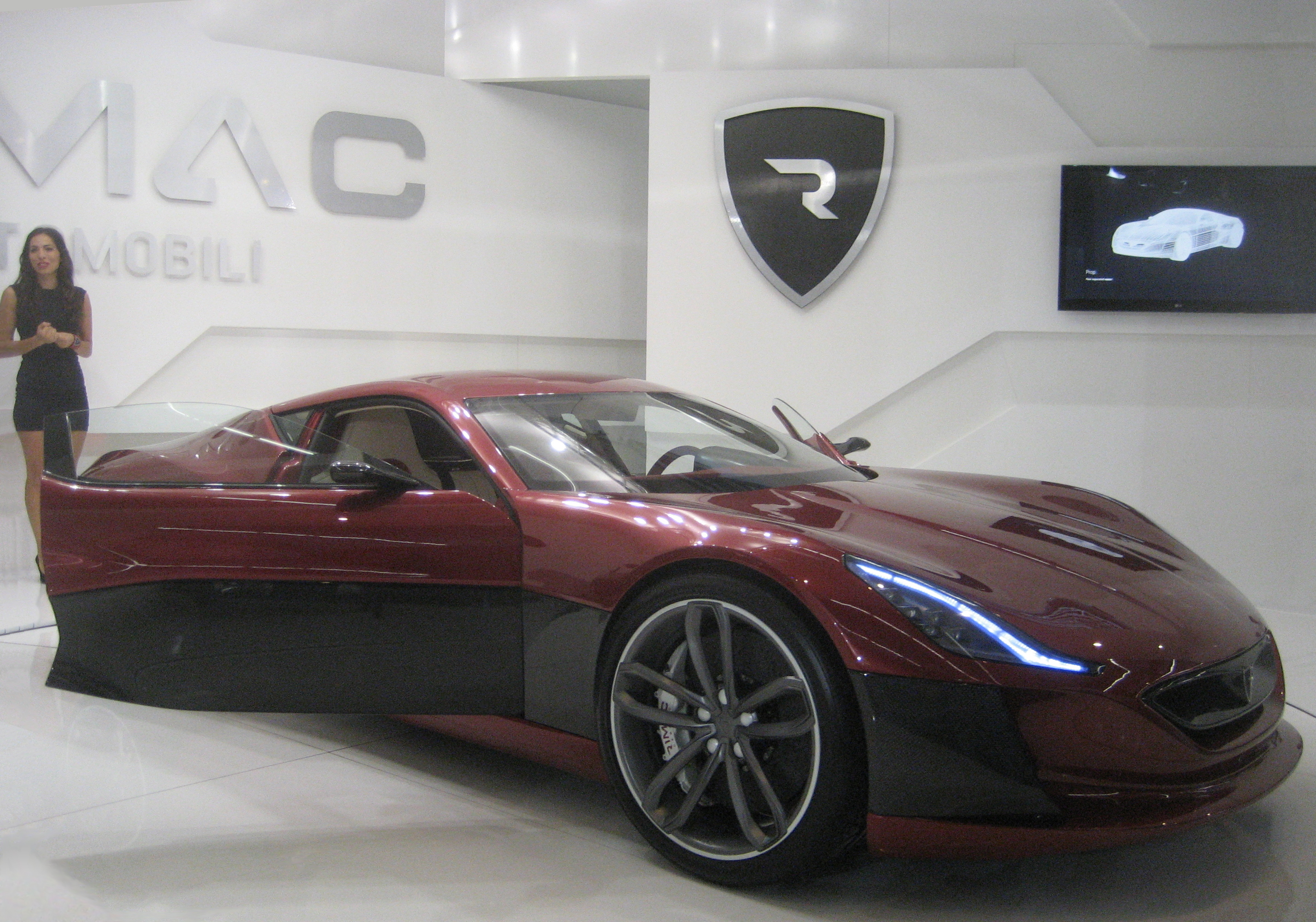
Rimac Concept One at the 2011 Frankfurt Motor Show

While the company was founded in 2009, Rimac had no employees until 2011. In 2010, Rimac met Adriano Mudri, who was a designer at General Motors at that time. Rimac proposed to Mudri to develop an electric supercar together. They agreed and started working on a concept as a paper exercise. Rimac was a university student while Mudri was working for GM so both of them worked on the project during nights and weekends: Rimac on the technology and Mudri on the design.

By late 2010, Rimac and Mudri had their first renderings, technical concepts and target specifications. At that time, Rimac was receiving media attention for his BMW conversion that was winning various races. That brought the attention of a fellow Croatian working for a Middle Eastern royal family, who asked Rimac to provide materials about the project that he was working on as the royal family might be interested in such projects. Rimac and Mudri prepared a brochure with renderings and technical specifications of the car that they were working on and soon got a call that the royal family was interested in buying two cars. As Rimac, at the time, had no real company, employees or other resources, he told the potential customers that he could not build the car. The customers then offered to invest in Rimac's efforts to enable him to build the car. Rimac started to work on a business plan and received a proposal from the investors shortly thereafter.

Rimac was already struggling to pay salaries, rent and suppliers while trying to build the first prototype of the Concept_One with an inexperienced team. Needing the investor money, Rimac still decided to refuse to move the company to the Middle East and as a result, lost his only investors. "It was the best thing I've ever done," he said years later, as this move allowed him to keep the company in Croatia. Left with no other choice, Rimac decided to find engineering work for the struggling young company as a revenue stream, while trying to keep the development of the car going. Rimac started to work for other automotive companies to develop batteries, electric powertrain systems or full vehicles as a means of survival, while, at the same time, building their own supercars and trying to find investors to fund bringing their own cars to the market.

Rimac always wanted to show that it was possible to build a car and a car company in Croatia. When he had started the company as a 21-year-old, he had no automotive experience and being from Croatia, a country with little automotive industry, he could not hire anybody with experience. Likewise, he did not have the financial means to attract foreign staff to bring in experience. He asked the University for Mechanical Engineering in Zagreb for help to develop the car, but was told by a professor that it was impossible to build a car in Croatia and that he should give up.

Rimac presented their first model, the Rimac Concept_One, at the 2011 Frankfurt Motor Show. Adriano Mudri has worked with Rimac ever since and is Rimac's Director of Design today.

During the initial years, Rimac was always on the edge of survival and having a hard time attracting investors to put money into a Croatian tech company. However, after years of proving themselves to the industry, Rimac grew and eventually attracted significant investment from companies such as Porsche, Hyundai and Kia.

In 2018, Rimac introduced its next generation sports car, the Nevera (renamed from C_Two). After undergoing final development and testing in 2020, production and customer deliveries were planned for 2021. As of 2021, the company is headquartered in Croatia, employs over 900 people and has grown into a leader within a competitive industry. The company is vertically integrated with many of the components produced in-house.

In January 2020, Rimac began working with influencer and race instructor, Misha Charoudin. On 2 November 2021, Rimac was announced CEO of Bugatti Rimac, a joint partnership between the Rimac Group, Bugatti and Porsche AG.

=== Greyp Bikes ===
In 2013, Rimac founded Greyp Bikes, a sister company of Rimac Automobili with the purpose of manufacturing high-performance electric bicycles with which he "intends to change the world".

Greyp currently sells a range of electric bicycles, and has won a Design Innovation Award for its technology. The bikes' Central Intelligence Module and eSim help to keep the bike online at all times, while a partner app allows for navigation, fitness tracking and data analysis.

In February 2023, Porsche AG took complete ownership of Greyp Bikes and the business is now known as Porsche eBike Performance GmbH.

== Honours ==
- 2014 Order of Danica Hrvatska with the face of Nikola Tesla
- 2017 EY Entrepreneur of the Year in Croatia (March 2018)
- 2017 Forbes Magazine Top 30 Under 30
- 2025 elected to the US National Academy of Engineering
