= Rimac Concept One =

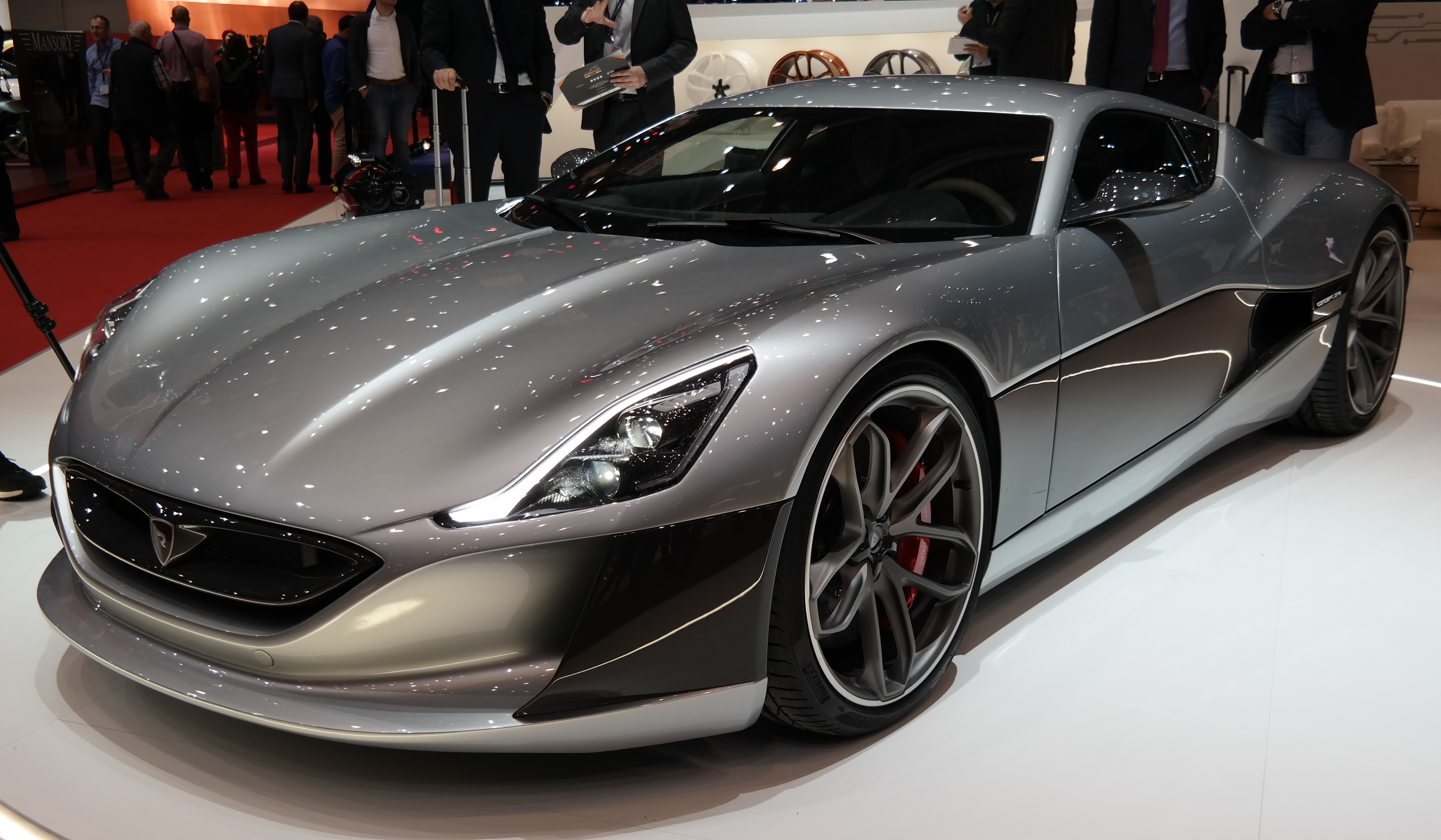

Overview
- Manufacturer: Rimac Automobili
- Also called: Concept_One
- Production: Concept One: January 2013 – November 2014; 8 produced (6 currently in existence); Concept S: 2016; 2 produced
- Assembly: Croatia: Sveta Nedelja
- Designer: Adriano Mudri (exterior); Goran Popović (interior)

Body and chassis
- Class: Sports car (S)
- Body style: 2-door coupé
- Layout: Individual-wheel drive

Powertrain
- Electric motor: 4 liquid-cooled permanent magnet synchronous electric motors placed at each wheel
- Battery: 92 kWh lithium iron phosphate (LiFePO_{4}) chemistry
- Range: 330 km (210 miles)

Dimensions
- Wheelbase: 2,750 mm (108.3 in)
- Length: 4,548 mm (179.1 in)
- Width: 1,854 mm (73.0 in)
- Height: 1,198 mm (47.2 in)
- Curb weight: 1,850 kg (4,080 lb)

Chronology
- Successor: Rimac Nevera

The Rimac Concept One, sometimes stylized as Concept_One, is a two-seat high-performance electric car designed and manufactured in Croatia by Rimac Automobili. With a total output of 913 kW (1,241 PS; 1,224 hp) and an acceleration time from 0–100 km/h (0–62 mph) in 2.5 seconds, the Rimac Concept One was claimed to be the world's fastest accelerating electric vehicle in 2013.

To advertise both Rimac Automobili and Formula E, the Concept One was used as the official zero-emission race director's car during the first season of Formula E championship in 2014.

== History ==
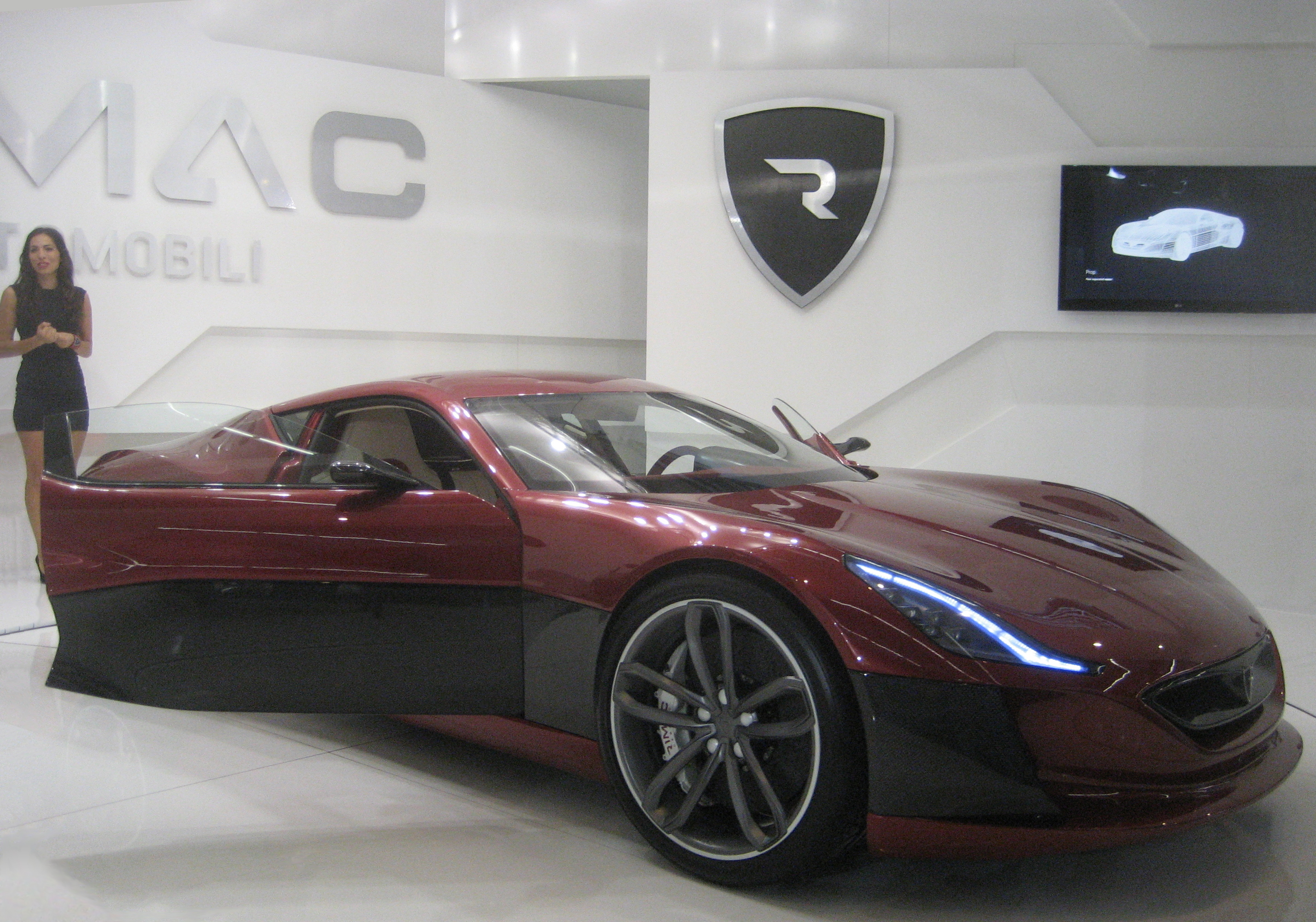
Rimac Concept One at the 2011 Frankfurt Motor Show

Rimac Automobili, an automobile manufacturing company established in 2009 in Sveta Nedelja, Croatia, grew out of its founder Mate Rimac's garage hobby. The company's primary objective was to build the world's first electric sports car, starting, as Rimac put it, "with a blank sheet of paper". Since electric systems for high-performance electric cars were not available on the market, the company developed the necessary parts in-house and patented 24 innovations.

When Mate Rimac's 1984 BMW 3 series blew its internal combustion engine while participating in a race, the opportunity was taken to convert it into an electric car. Working on his own, Rimac managed to fit a 442 kW (601 PS; 593 hp) electric powertrain in his 3 series, which would soon become the company's first test mule. The car, now called the "Green Monster", set five Fédération Internationale de l'Automobile (FIA)-sanctioned acceleration records in April 2011. This attracted the attention of the media and potential investors. Rimac also converted several other BMW 3 series (E30) cars into electric cars after some customers expressed interest in having such a car seeing the success of Rimac's car, and after some success, he moved to the more ambitious project of developing a car of his own. As a result, the electric sports car named the Concept One was born.

The Concept One was introduced at the 2011 Frankfurt Motor Show, and afterwards shown at the 2012 Paris Concours d'Elegance, where it received a positive response by the general public and potential customers. The car was set to cost US$980,000 once the serial production started in 2013. A limited production of 88 units was to be offered. The first car was delivered to an anonymous Spanish customer in January 2013. Rimac participated at the 2015 Pikes Peak International Hill Climb with a 1,100 kW (1,500 PS; 1,500 hp) highly customised version called the E-Runner Concept_One. The vehicle took second place overall competing against ICE vehicles. The driver was the multiple Pikes Peak winner Nobuhiro Tajima.

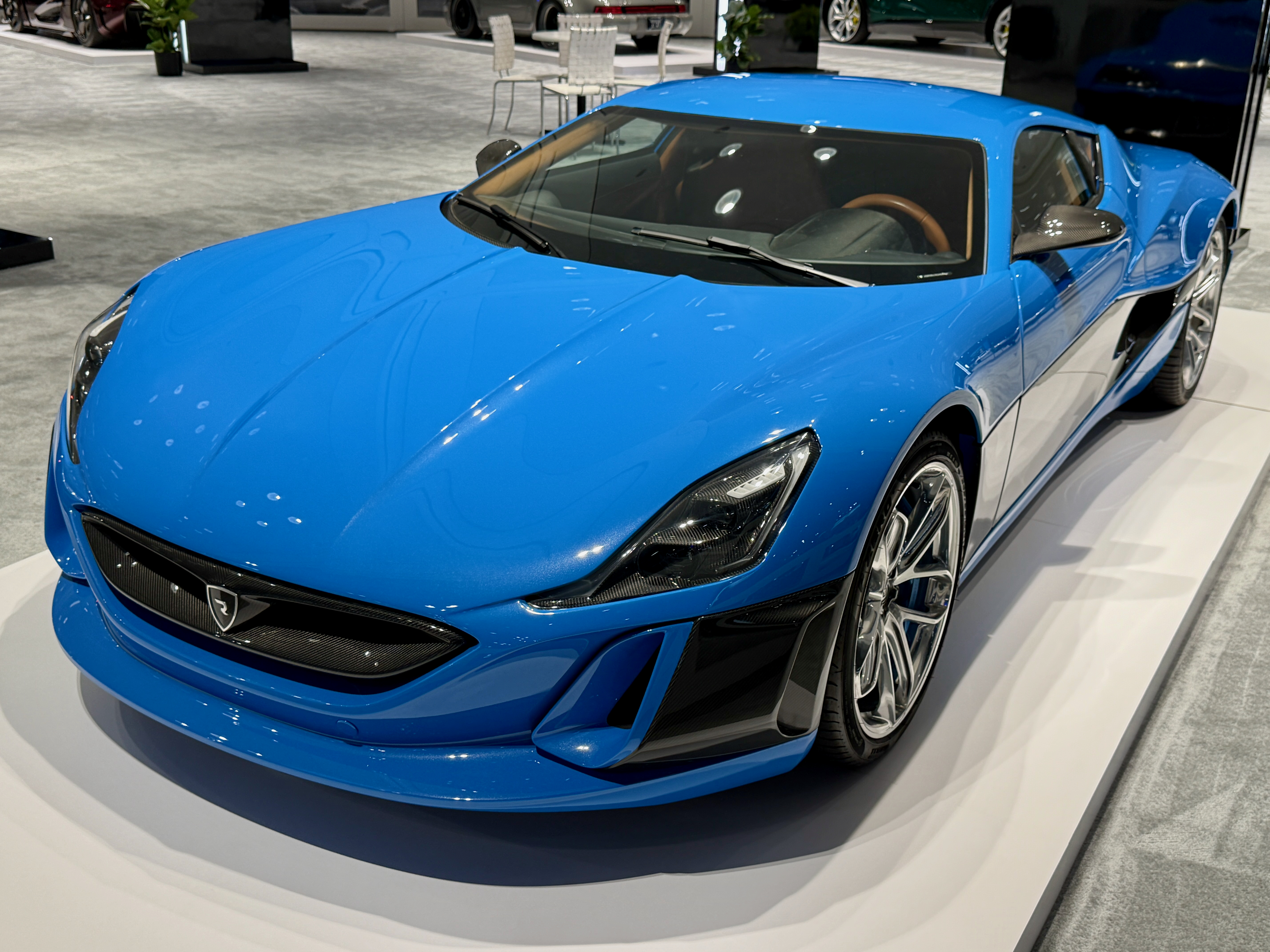
Rimac Concept One at the New York Auto Show

After a series of incremental improvements, the final version of the car was presented at the March 2016 Geneva Motor Show. In 2017, the Concept One participated at the Goodwood Festival of Speed for the first time, breaking the EV speed record on a timed track.

On 10 June 2017, journalist and television presenter Richard Hammond crashed one of the eight produced Concept One vehicles during filming for Series 2 of The Grand Tour. Hammond was on his last run up a timed hill climb course during the Bergrennen Hemberg event in Switzerland, when, just after crossing the finish line, the car ran off the road. The car tumbled down the hill and eventually came to rest upside down 110 m (361 ft) from the road. The car caught fire, and continued to spontaneously do so for five days according to fellow presenter James May. Hammond survived with a broken leg.

On September 22, 2024, a Rimac Concept One car supposedly burned at the Naples Motorsports, the number one Rimac dealer in Florida.

== Specifications ==
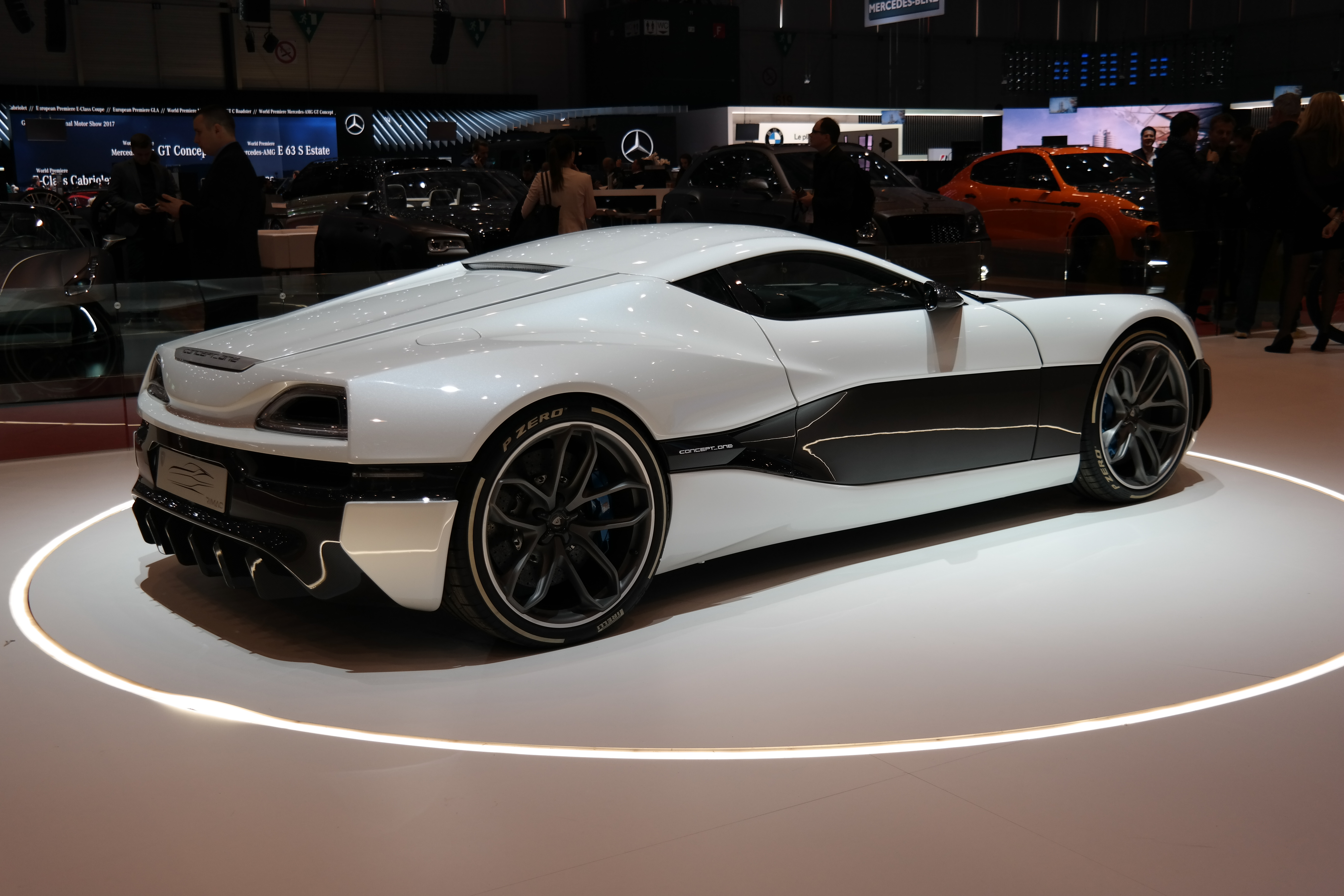
Rear view

With a total output of 913 kW (1,241 PS; 1,224 hp) and 1,600 N⋅m (1,180 lb⋅ft) of torque, the Concept One accelerates from 0–100 km/h (62 mph) in 2.5 seconds and has an electronically limited top speed of 340 km/h (211 mph). Each wheel is powered by a separate liquid-cooled permanent magnet synchronous electric motor and controlled by the so-called "All Wheel Torque Vectoring System" that distributes the power to the wheels in accordance with user setup and driving conditions. The car features carbon ceramic brakes for improved stopping power. Also, the car has the ability to switch the power from front-wheel to rear-wheel drive or to equally distribute the power between all wheels.

The motors are powered by a 92 kWh LiFePO_{4} (lithium iron phosphate) battery, giving the car a range of 349 km (217 miles) per charge. The car's body is made of carbon fibre. The interior features custom leather upholstery and hand-made dashboard components.

In the subsequent version presented at the 2016 Geneva Motor Show, some performance figures were further optimised: the acceleration from 0–100 km/h (62 mph) was achieved in 2.6 seconds, from 0–200 km/h (124 mph) in 6.2 seconds, and from 0–300 km/h (186 mph) in 14.2 seconds. The best 402 metres (1/4 mi) time recorded was 9.9 seconds. The electronically limited top speed was increased to 356 km/h (221 mph).

In 2017, the 0–97 km/h (60 mph) acceleration time was improved to 2.4 seconds. 0–100 km/h (62 mph) took 2.5 seconds, 0–200 km/h (124 mph) took 6 seconds, and 300 km/h (186 mph) took 14 seconds. The range was increased from 330 to 350 km (205 to 217 miles).

== Sales ==
In 2017, Rimac Automobili established official dealerships with PACE Germany, Manhattan Motorcars and Al Marooni Group for the regions of Europe, North America and the Middle East.

== Concept S ==
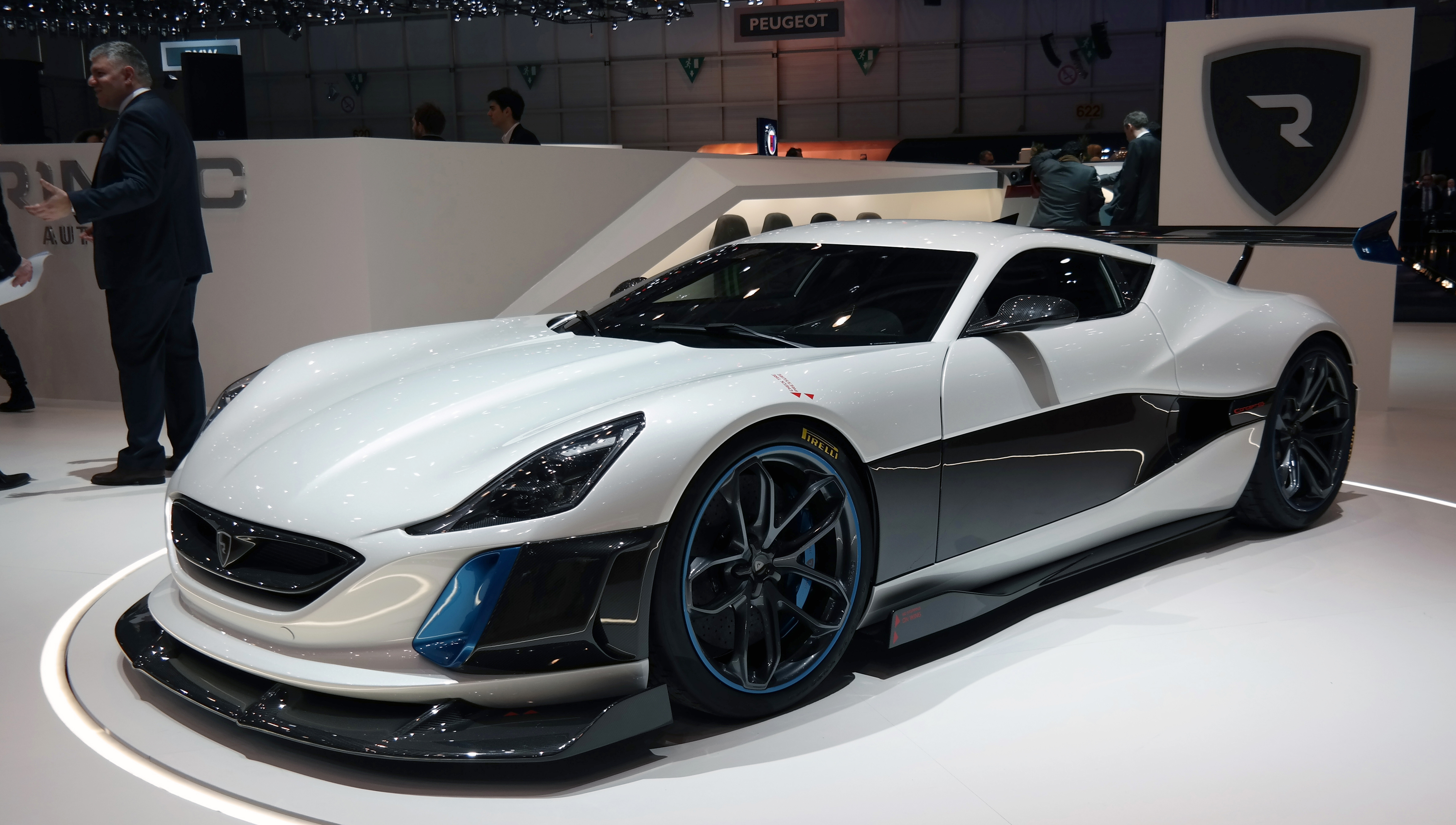
Rimac Concept S at the 2016 Geneva Motor Show

The Concept S is a lighter, more powerful, more aerodynamic and track-oriented iteration of the Concept One. The electric motors in the Concept S can generate 1,032 kW (1,384 hp), enabling the car to accelerate from 0–100 km/h (0–62 mph) in 2.5 seconds and attain a top speed of 365 km/h (227 mph). By making modifications to produce the carbon fibre shell of the car, Rimac has reduced the weight of the Concept S by 50 kg (110 lb). The car also receives a full aerodynamic package which includes a large carbon fibre front splitter, side skirts, racing slicks and a large rear wing that generates 34% more downforce than the Concept One. On the interior, the car features racing bucket seats with 4-point racing harness, a new steering wheel, a driver focused infotainment system that projects only the most important information on the central display and Alcantara trim. Production was limited to two cars.

== Derived vehicles ==
At the end of 2014 the Volar-e was put on the market. The company Applus+ IDIADA built this vehicle based on the Rimac Concept One, however, the battery size was reduced in order to save weight (38 kWh). The car had a range of 200 km (120 miles). The battery could be recharged in 15 minutes.

== Reception ==
Dan Prosser, in a 2016 review for the magazine EVO, praised the vehicle's performance, styling, and torque vectoring system, but criticized its small cabin size and the brake pedal feel, giving it 3½ out of 5 stars. He nonetheless stated "The Concept One does lack the soundtrack and the dramatic power delivery of a conventional supercar, but in the way it accelerates and in the way its torque vectoring system picks apart a corner it is enormously entertaining to drive quickly" and concluded that the car "proves EVs can be spectacular to drive".

Richard Meaden wrote in EVO "Of all the emerging players, Croatian-based Rimac Automobili is by far the most interesting, the most authentic and, to my mind, the most evo. A leader in battery and electric-motor technology, its Concept One hypercar impressively showcases the fruits of its labours, with a huge amount of the car done in-house. ... If Rimac's own Concept One becomes a production reality it could well be a game-changer – the Tesla of the hypercar world."

In 2017, Road & Track tested the car on city streets and described it as an "electric techno extravaganza" and claimed that "the carbon tub you sit in is rigid as a nuclear bunker". It described the feeling of taking off in traffic as "utterly impressive" and noticed its quietness by stating that "Rimac's hypercar only makes a sound when its inverters kick in, as a gentle reminder that you're sitting in the automotive equivalent of a small power station. A sexy, clean, fast and driftable power station."

The crew of Amazon Prime show The Grand Tour talked about the car in 2017 shortly after Richard Hammond's crash. Jeremy Clarkson, in a column for The Times, called it "amazing" and "brilliant", and stated that during his brief time behind the wheel he "couldn't believe how fast it accelerated", adding "we're not talking here about something that's as fast as Lamborghini Aventador. It is massively faster than that; it is faster than anything else I've ever driven by a huge, huge margin." Richard Hammond, when asked for his take on the car during an interview session for DriveTribe, said he "loved it; it was astonishing", maintaining it had "proper ambition in terms of range" and describing its all-wheel torque vectoring system as "breathtaking". He further commented that it "felt genuinely futuristic and modern" and that "we are going to have to invent a whole new vocabulary ... for the sounds these things make". James May described it as an "exquisite pearl white electrical delicacy".

Alex Roy tested the car in an episode for the NBC Sports programme /Drive that 2as broadcast on 26 October 2017, and gave positive impressions. He stated "I haven't driven anything this fast in my life. Absolutely changes the game." on Twitter.

The car was chosen as one of the Top 10 Tech Cars by the IEEE in 2018.

== See also ==
- List of electric cars currently available
- List of modern production plug-in electric vehicles
- Plug-in electric vehicle
