= RAESR =

American electric sports carmaker

RAESR Automotive
- Industry: Automotive
- Founded: 2014; 12 years ago
- Founder: Eric Rice
- Headquarters: Los Angeles, California
- Key people: Eric Rice (CEO), Chris Khoury (CTO)
- Products: Sports cars Engineering Consultations
- Website: raesr.com

RAESR (unabbreviated as Rice Advanced Engineering Systems and Research) is an American automobile manufacturer founded in 2014 in Los Angeles, California by Eric Rice. The company is based in Los Angeles, California and specializes in the production of electric sports cars. Their prototype model, the "Tachyon Speed", was first introduced to the public in late 2017 through an electric vehicle infrastructure series made by E.ON, one of Europe's largest energy conglomerates.

== Company ==
The company was founded in 2014 in Los Angeles, California by Eric Rice. Rice came up with the inspiration for the car in 2012, by drawing an early version of the car which looked like a jet fighter fuselage. This encouraged him to build the car. He started with the chassis production and brought on other engineers and designers to help. For their first model they came up with name Tachyon, which is a hypothetical particle that always travels faster than light. The word tachyon comes from the Greek word "tachus," which means "fast."

In 2017, RAESR completed production of their first prototype, the Tachyon Speed, and started working on their first production model.

Their cars are electric, using rechargeable batteries.

== Tachyon Speed prototype ==
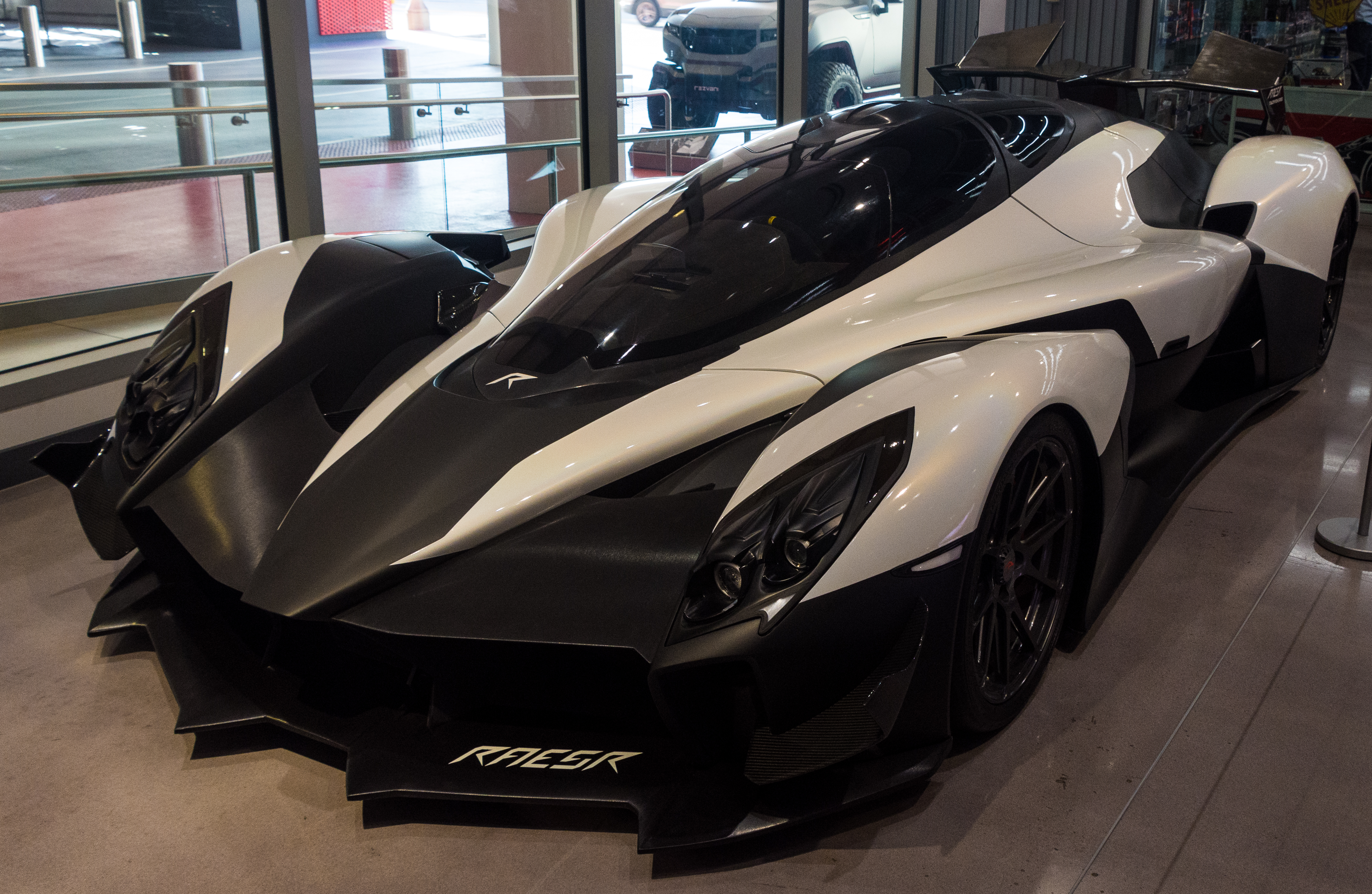
Tachyon Speed prototype on display at the Petersen Automotive Museum on 20 April 2022.

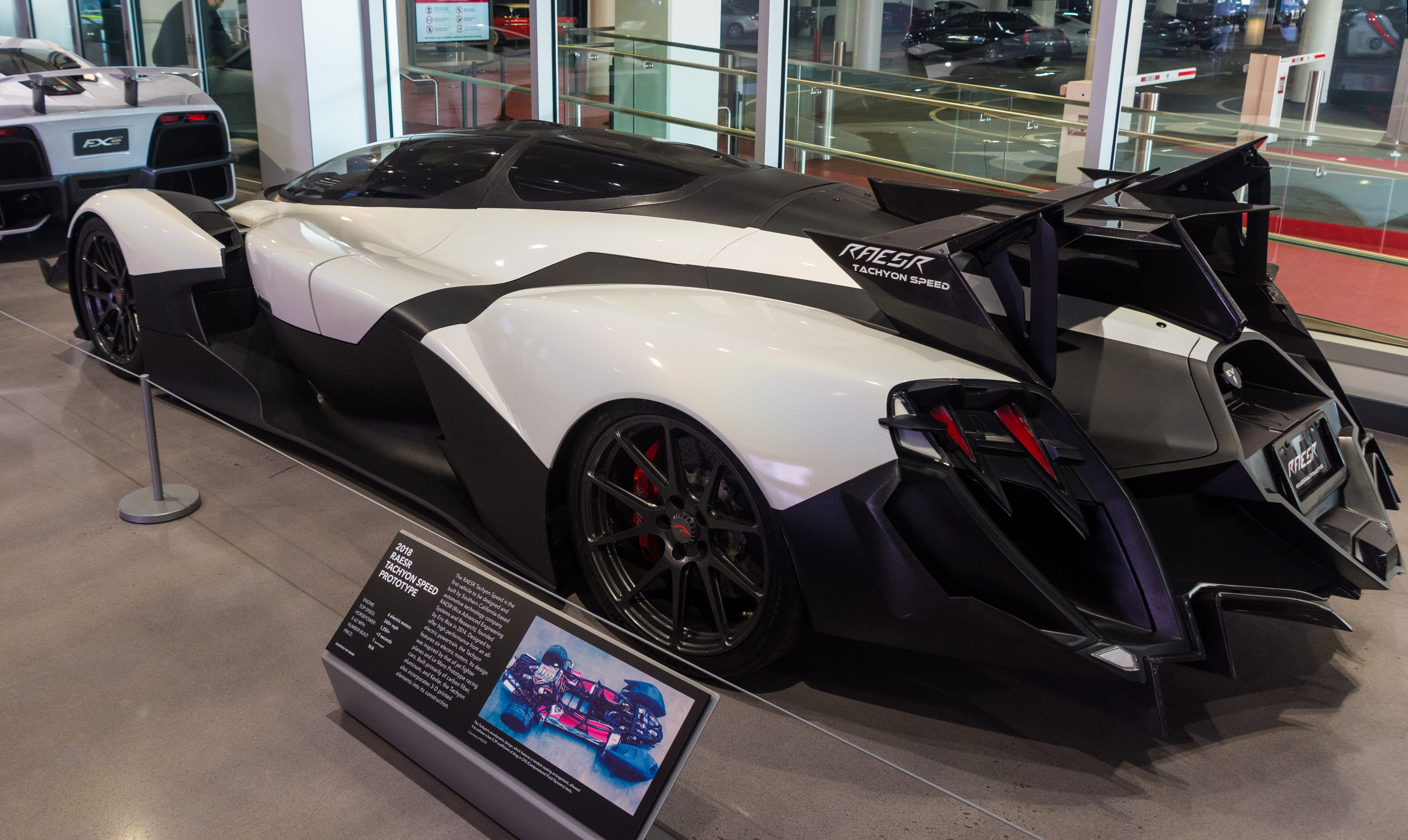
Tachyon Speed rear

The RAESR Tachyon Speed is a prototype electric sports car produced in-house by RAESR in Los Angeles, California. RAESR claims their design was inspired by a jet fighter and Le Mans Prototype. The RAESR Tachyon Speed's electric motors produce over 1,250 hp (930 kW) and a cumulative torque value of 3,650 lb⋅ft (4,950 N⋅m), which RAESR claim will allow it to reach a top speed of 240 mph (390 km/h). The car's battery pack is capable of generating power bursts of 1.4 megawatts and has a range of 150 mi (240 km). The production model pricing was planned to start at US$750,000.

== See also ==
- Rimac Automobili
- Tesla
- Pininfarina
