= Franz-Josef Paefgen =

German engineer (born 1946)

Franz-Josef Paefgen (born 10 May 1946 in Büttgen) is a German engineer and manager. In 1976, Paefgen earned a doctoral degree in mechanical engineering from the RWTH Aachen University. He was most recently the CEO of Bentley Motors and Bugatti Automobiles SAS, from which he retired in 2011.

Prior to the roles at Bentley and Bugatti, Dr Paefgen held several positions at Ford Motor Company and Audi where he also was CEO.

During his time as the Chief Executive Officer of Bentley Motors Ltd., he was responsible for the Bentley Mulsanne and the Bentley Continental series of cars. From 2003 to 2005, Dr. Paefgen was responsible for the development of the Bugatti Veyron.

Since departing from Bentley and Bugatti, Dr Paefgen has accepted a position of a Board Member at the Finnish automotive company Valmet Automotive. He is a member of the supervisory board of German automotive supplier ZF Friedrichshafen AG.
