= Bugatti Rimac =

Croatian automobile manufacturer

Bugatti Rimac d.o.o.
- Type: Joint venture (d.o.o.)
- Industry: Automotive
- Founded: November 1, 2021; 4 years ago
- Headquarters: Sveta Nedelja, Croatia
- Area served: Worldwide
- Key people: Mate Rimac (CEO)
- Products: Sports cars
- Owners: Rimac Group (55%); HOF Capital (45%)
- Number of employees: 435 (2021)
- Subsidiaries: Bugatti Automobiles; Rimac Automobili
- Website: bugatti-rimac.com

Bugatti Rimac is a joint venture headquartered in Sveta Nedelja, Croatia, known for the car brands Bugatti and Rimac. The two brands were united under the business decision of Porsche, giving control of Bugatti to Mate Rimac and in return receive more share in Rimac Group, which includes Rimac Technology, a company that develops batteries and powertrains. Through this Rimac Group owned 55% and Porsche 45% in Bugatti Rimac. Rimac Group in turn is owned by Mate Rimac, Porsche, Hyundai Motor Group, and other minority shareholders. In April 2026, Porsche sold all of its stake in Bugatti Rimac to New York-based venture capital company HOF Capital. Porsche also sold all of its stake in Rimac Group.

Rimac Automobili and Bugatti Automobiles operate as separate brands and manufacturers, having production facilities in Zagreb, Croatia and Molsheim, France, et cetera. The global headquarters of Bugatti Rimac is located in the previous headquarters of Rimac Automobili in Sveta Nedelja near Zagreb. Bugatti Rimac employs 435 workers, with a staff of 300 in Sveta Nedelja and 135 in Molsheim in France.

On 20 August 2022, Bugatti Rimac presented its first joint car, the Bugatti W16 Mistral.
