= Bugatti Tourbillon =

Sports car manufactured by Bugatti

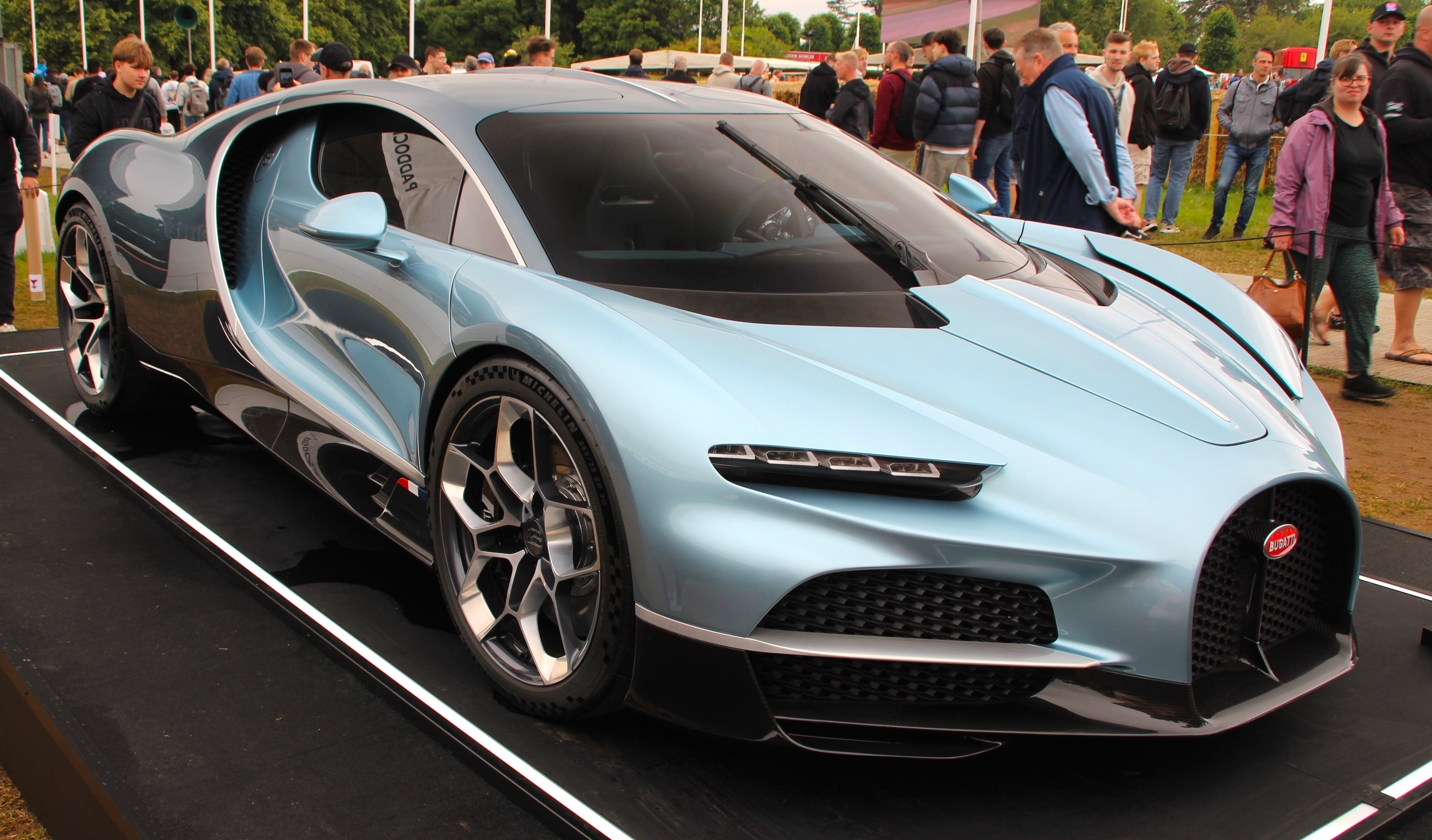

Overview
- Manufacturer: Bugatti Automobiles S.A.S.
- Production: 2026–present
- Assembly: France: Molsheim (Bugatti Molsheim Plant)
- Designer: Frank Heyl

Body and chassis
- Class: Sports car (S)
- Body style: 2-door coupé
- Layout: Mid-engine, all-wheel-drive
- Doors: Butterfly

Powertrain
- Engine: 8,355 cubic centimetres (509.9 cu in; 8.4 L) Cosworth V16
- Electric motor: 3× electric motors (2× on front & 1× in the rear)
- Power output: Petrol Engine: 1,000 PS (986 hp; 735 kW) @ 9,000 rpm; 900 N⋅m (664 lbf⋅ft); Electric motors: 800 PS (789 hp; 588 kW); 1,400 N⋅m (1,000 lbf⋅ft); (670 PS (661 hp; 493 kW) 2× in front motors + 335 PS (330 hp; 246 kW) 1× between engine and Transmission); Combined: 1,800 PS (1,775 hp; 1,324 kW); 2,300 N⋅m (1,696 lbf⋅ft)
- Transmission: 8-speed DCT
- Hybrid drivetrain: PHEV
- Battery: 24.8 kWh
- Electric range: 60 km (37 mi) (WLTP)

Dimensions
- Wheelbase: 2,740 mm (107.9 in)
- Length: 4,671 mm (183.9 in)
- Width: 2,051 mm (80.7 in)
- Height: 1,189 mm (46.8 in)
- Kerb weight: 1,995 kg (4,398 lb)

Chronology
- Predecessor: Bugatti Chiron

The Bugatti Tourbillon is a mid-engine hybrid sports car manufactured by French automobile manufacturer Bugatti. The Tourbillon succeeds the Chiron and is limited to 250 units. It was unveiled in an online live stream on 20 June 2024. It is priced at €3.8 million (US$4.1 million).

The car is named after the tourbillon, a mechanism used in certain high end mechanical watches to increase their accuracy.

== Design ==
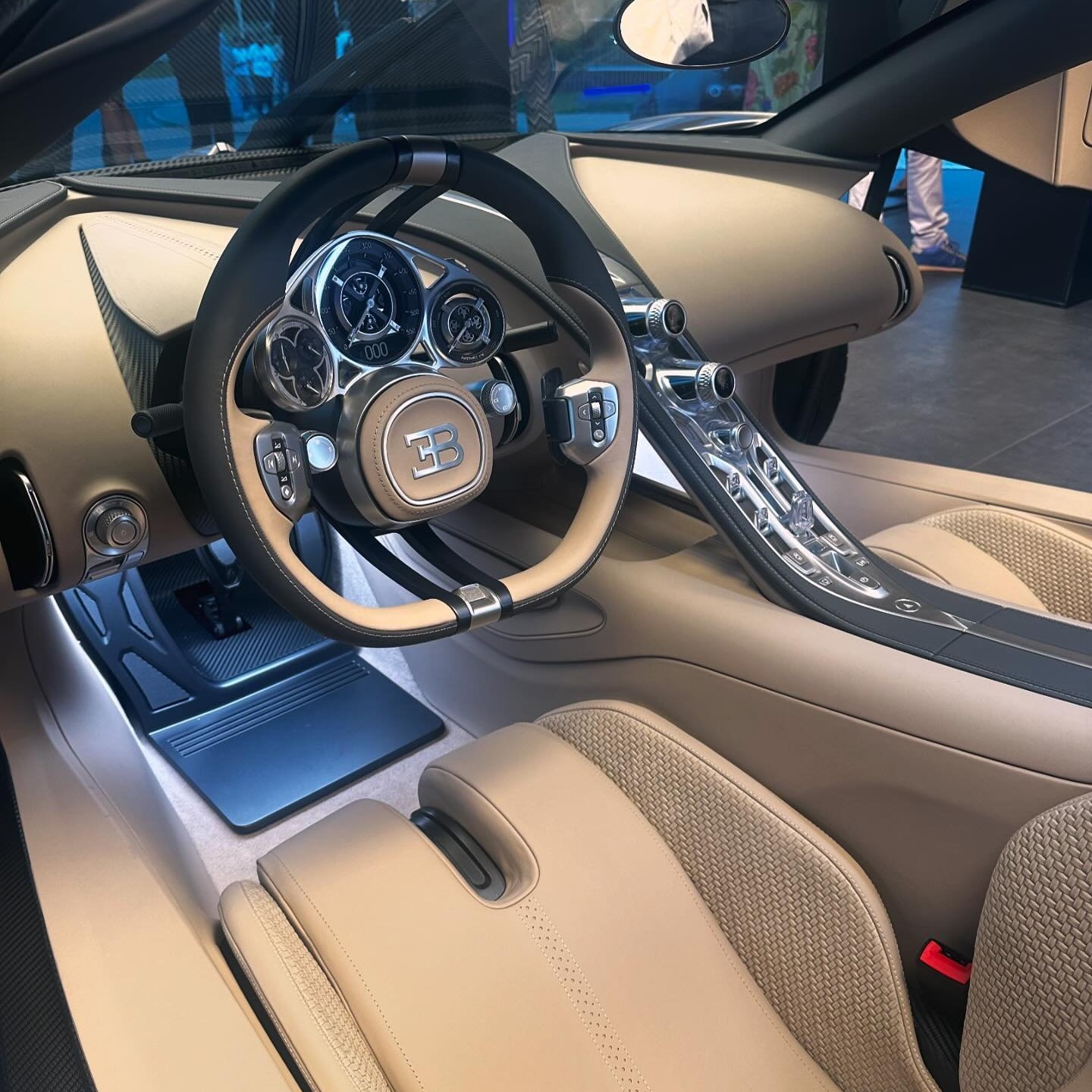
Interior

Bugatti states that the Tourbillon is a completely new design, and does not share any components with the outgoing Chiron. However, in keeping with the Bugatti brand lineage, it does share many of its key design cues, including the horseshoe grille, central spine, C-shaped side body lines, and two-tone body colour. One of the stated inspirations for the Tourbillon was mechanical watches, with the interior featuring a number of watch inspired details. Another design theme of the Tourbillon is "skeletonized" mechanical design, where the mechanisms of components are made visible as a part of the design.

The interior of the Tourbillon features a fully analogue instrument cluster operated by mechanical gears and designed to look like a watch movement, with the speedometer and tachometer needles arranged to resemble an hour and minute hand. It also features a steering wheel with a fixed central hub where only the outer rim rotates, allowing the instrument cluster to remain visible at all times. Unlike past Bugatti models, the Tourbillon features a centre infotainment screen, which retracts into the dashboard when not in use. Bugatti says that, like in past models, their goal was to make sure that the car remains "timeless", even when the screen technology becomes outdated. The centre panel of the Tourbillon is made from machined aluminium and machined crystal glass, while the watch-inspired instrument cluster is made from titanium by Swiss watchmaker Concepto.

== Specifications ==
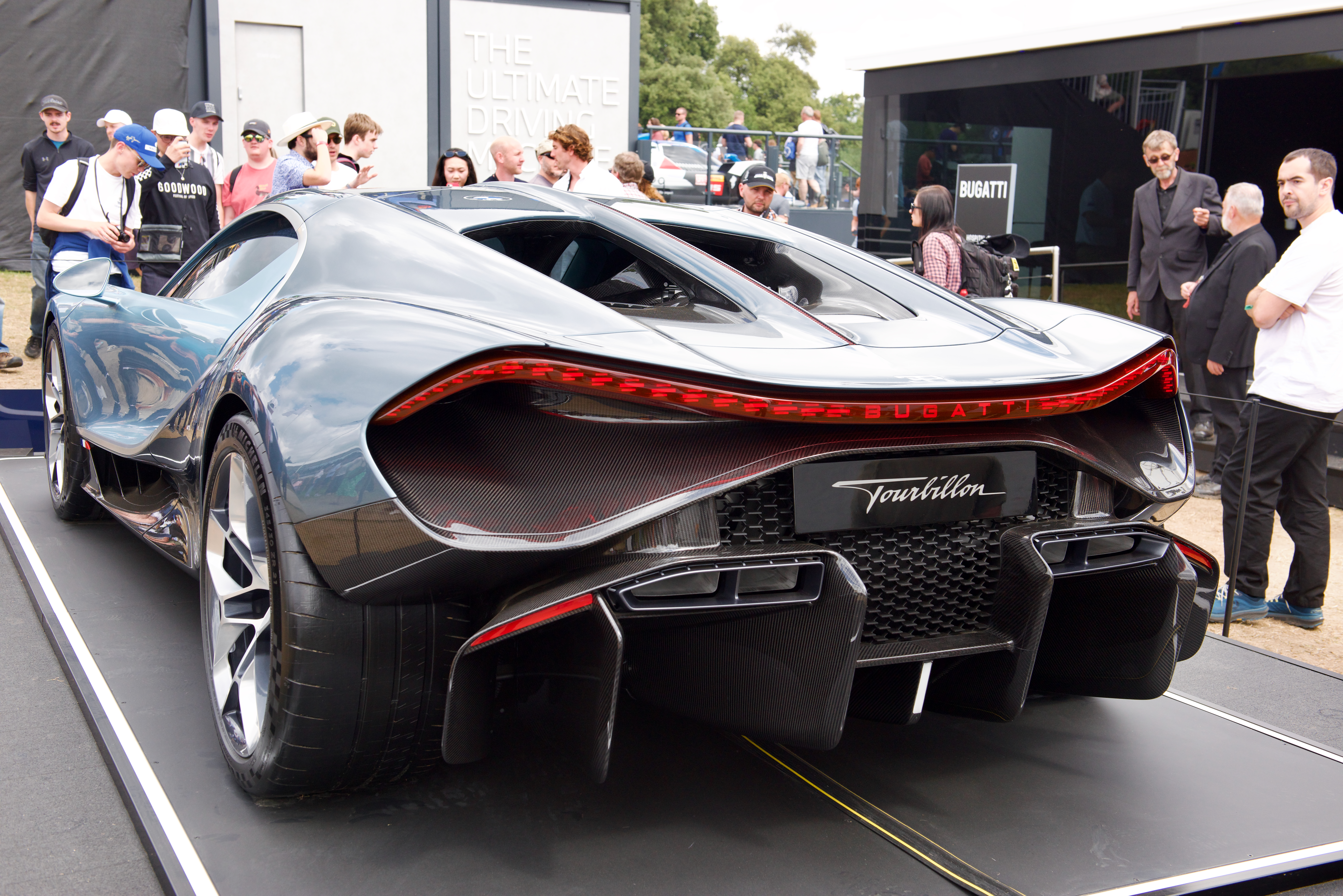
Rear view

The Tourbillon is powered by a naturally aspirated 8,355 cc (8.4 L; 509.9 cu in) V16 engine. The engine, developed by Cosworth, has a bore × stroke of 92 mm × 78.55 mm (3.62 in × 3.09 in) and is implemented in conjunction with 3 electric motors, 2 located at the front axle and 1 at the rear. The engine has a power output of 1,000 PS (735 kW; 986 hp) and 900 N⋅m (664 lb⋅ft) of torque, while the electric motors have a combined power output of 800 PS (588 kW; 789 hp), making for a total of 1,800 PS (1,324 kW; 1,775 hp). Bugatti says that the choice to replace the quad turbocharger setup of the Chiron with a naturally aspirated engine was to make the experience "more emotional" and allow for a higher rev count, with the engine redlining at 9,000 rpm. The V16 features a crossplane crank design, a 90-degree bank angle, and dry sump lubrication system. The engine weighs a total of 252 kg (556 lb). The Tourbillon uses an 8-speed dual-clutch transmission mounted longitudinally at the rear of the engine, in contrast to the Chiron where it was mounted at the front. The battery is a 24.8 kWh unit mounted in front of the engine in the central tunnel, which allows for a complete electric range of around 60 km (37 mi).

For the suspension of the Tourbillon, Bugatti collaborated with Divergent Technologies, the parent company of Czinger, to create organically shaped 3D-printed suspension components designed with the assistance of AI. The suspension is a forged aluminium multi-link setup that Bugatti says is 45 percent lighter than the suspension system found in the Chiron.

The chassis of the Tourbillon is made from T800 carbon composite, with front and rear frames that use 3D printed braces, and a battery that is integrated into the monocoque in order to save weight. It also features a diffuser designed to serve as part of the crash structure in place of a rear crash beam, which functions as another weight-saving measure.

== Performance ==
Bugatti say they expect the Tourbillon will be able to accelerate from 0–100 km/h (62 mph) in under 2.0 seconds, 0–200 km/h (124 mph) in under 5.0 seconds, 0–300 km/h (186 mph) in under 10.0 seconds and 0–400 km/h (249 mph) in under 25.0 seconds. It has an electronically limited top speed of 380 km/h (236 mph) but the limit is raised to 445 km/h (277 mph) when a speed key is inserted.
