= Manhattan Motorcars =

- Type: Private
- Industry: Automotive
- Headquarters: New York, NY, USA
- Number of locations: 2
- Key people: Brian Miller
- Products: Sports cars, Luxury vehicles
- Services: Sales, service and parts
- Website: www.manhattanmotorcars.com

Manhattan Motorcars is a New York City luxury car dealership. It is the only official Porsche, Lamborghini, Bentley, Bugatti, Rolls-Royce, Koenigsegg, Lotus and Rimac dealer in Manhattan.

== About ==
Manhattan Motorcars was founded in 1995 by father-and-son Arthur and Brian Miller. The business has two locations: Manhattan Motorcars at 711 Eleventh Avenue and Manhattan Motorcars Chelsea at 270 Eleventh Avenue, a building owned by Michael Dezer who is an influential real estate developer and car collector.

In March 2014, Koenigsegg Supercars announced that it was appointing Manhattan Motorcars as its main point of sale for America's northeast. At the time, the supercar company had only three North American dealers to cover the U.S. and Canada. A year later, the dealership added Bugatti. In 2017, the Rimac Automobili franchise was added to its Chelsea location.

== Philanthropy ==
In 2014, Manhattan Motorcars and its owner Brian Miller participated with other auto dealers in the New York metropolitan area with the donation of more than 3,000 coats to the needy in the midst of one of the coldest and snowiest winters on record. Auto dealers in the New York metropolitan area got together to contribute and make the donation. Manhattan Motorcars often was the host to charitable events including the annual Our Place VIP Blackjack tournament.

== Media Reception ==
The company has been quoted and sometimes mentioned in the media, including former news publications such as the Wall Street Journal, the New York Times, the Daily News (New York) and others.
