= Camel Group =

Chinese battery manufacturer

Camel Group Co., Ltd.
- Company type: Public
- Traded as: SSE: 601311
- Industry: Batteries
- Headquarters: Xiangyang, China
- Key people: Liu Changlai (CEO)
- Website: www.chinacamel.com

Camel Group (SSE: 601311) is a Chinese battery recycling and manufacturing company. It is one of the largest car battery manufacturers in the world.

In 2017, the company invested 30 million EUR through IJNR Investments inc in Rimac Automobili, a Croatian sports car maker. Both companies are jointly pursuing the construction of a factory in Xiangyang for propulsion systems for electric vehicles. The joint venture was ended in 2024.

On August 1, 2023, the United States Department of Homeland Security announced goods produced by Camel would be restricted from entering the United States under the Uyghur Forced Labor Prevention Act, citing the company's "participation in business practices that target members of persecuted groups, including Uyghur minorities."
