= Rimac Automobili =

Croatian automotive manufacturer

- Type: Subsidiary
- Industry: Automotive
- Founded: 2009; 17 years ago
- Founder: Mate Rimac
- Headquarters: Sveta Nedelja, Croatia
- Area served: Worldwide
- Products: Electric sports cars; Battery systems
- Number of employees: 1,500
- Parent: Bugatti Rimac
- Website: rimac-automobili.com

Rimac Automobili (Croatian pronunciation: [rǐːmats automobǐːli], REE-mahts) is a Croatian automotive manufacturer headquartered in Sveta Nedelja, Croatia, that develops and produces electric sports cars. Its sister company, Rimac Technology (part of the Rimac Group) also produces drivetrains and battery systems for the automotive businesses.

The company was founded in 2009 by Mate Rimac and now sits under the Bugatti Rimac joint company, which includes both Bugatti Automobiles and Rimac Automobili itself. Rimac Automobili's first model, the Concept One, was allegedly the world's fastest production electric vehicle, even though only 8 of them were ever produced. During the 88th Geneva International Motor Show in 2018, the company unveiled its second model, the Rimac Nevera. This model also managed to set some groundbreaking world records in the production electric vehicle category, while never publishing the number of produced units.

== History ==
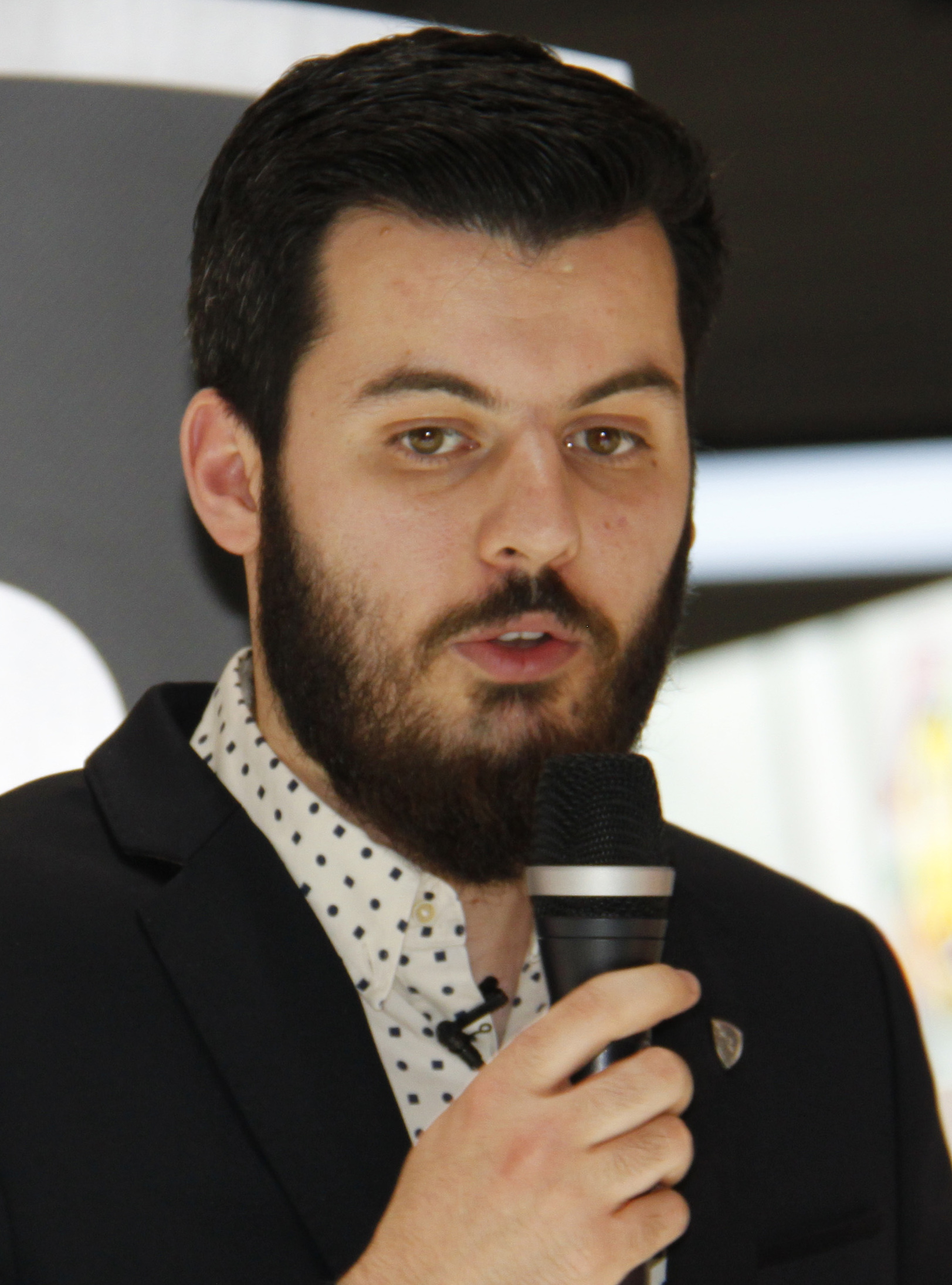
Founder Mate Rimac at the 2017 Geneva Motor Show

The groundwork for the company was laid in 2007 as a hobby garage activity of Mate Rimac. He converted his BMW 3 Series (E30) to incorporate an electric powertrain and subsequently gained attention from the press and investors. A significant part of the early financing came from angel investors and the sale of proprietary patents.

Rimac Automobili was founded in 2009 in Sveta Nedelja, near Zagreb, Croatia, where suitable facilities were rented. When he was 19 years old, Mate Rimac began converting an E30-M3 which served as his first test mule.

In 2018, Volkswagen Group subsidiary Porsche Engineering Group GmbH acquired a 10% stake in Rimac to form a development partnership, as part of its electrification process. Hyundai Motor Company and Kia Motors jointly invested €80 million in 2019 and announced plans "to collaborate on the development of high-performance electric vehicles." In 2020, Rimac recommended Infinum, the largest Balkan software and design company, to Porsche and that led to the creation of the joint venture Porsche Digital Croatia with an investment of €10 million.

In March 2021, Porsche increased its stake in Rimac Automobili from 15% to 24%.

In July 2021, VW Group's Porsche and Rimac announced a joint venture that would incorporate Volkswagen's high-performance Bugatti brand as well as Rimac Automobili. The new venture is called Bugatti Rimac. In this venture, Rimac Group holds a 55% stake, while Porsche owns the remaining 45%. in June of that year, Porsche stated it was one of the participants in a new €500 million round of fundraising.

In September 2023, Rimac Tokyo and Rimac Katowice were established in Japan and Poland, respectively.

== Models ==
=== e-M3 ===
Rimac's first car was a converted 1984 BMW M3 called the Rimac e-M3. With a 0–100 km/h (62 mph) acceleration achieved in 3.3 seconds, it earned the title of fastest-accelerating electric vehicle in Category A, Group VIII (electric vehicle) and Class 3 (over 1,000 kg) in 2011. It develops 442 kW (601 PS; 593 hp) and 900 N⋅m (664 lb⋅ft) of torque, reaches 100 km/h from a standstill in 3.3 s and has a top speed of 280 km/h (174 mph). Five development updates pushed the e-M3 to become the officially fastest-accelerating electric vehicle according to strict FIA rules.

- Records set on 17 April 2011:
  - 1/8 mile: 7.549 s
  - 1/4 mile: 11.808 s
  - 1/2 km: 13.714 s*
  - 1 km: 23.260 s*
  - 1 mile: 35.347 s*

*Records subject to official FIA approval (pending)

The original BMW went through five stages of reinvention and now, says Rimac, "it got faster, lighter and more reliable each time." At that point, once he realised how little of the original car remained, he decided to build a new and faster car from scratch.

=== Ampster ===
The Ampster was a one-off electric-powered Opel Speedster.

=== Concept One ===
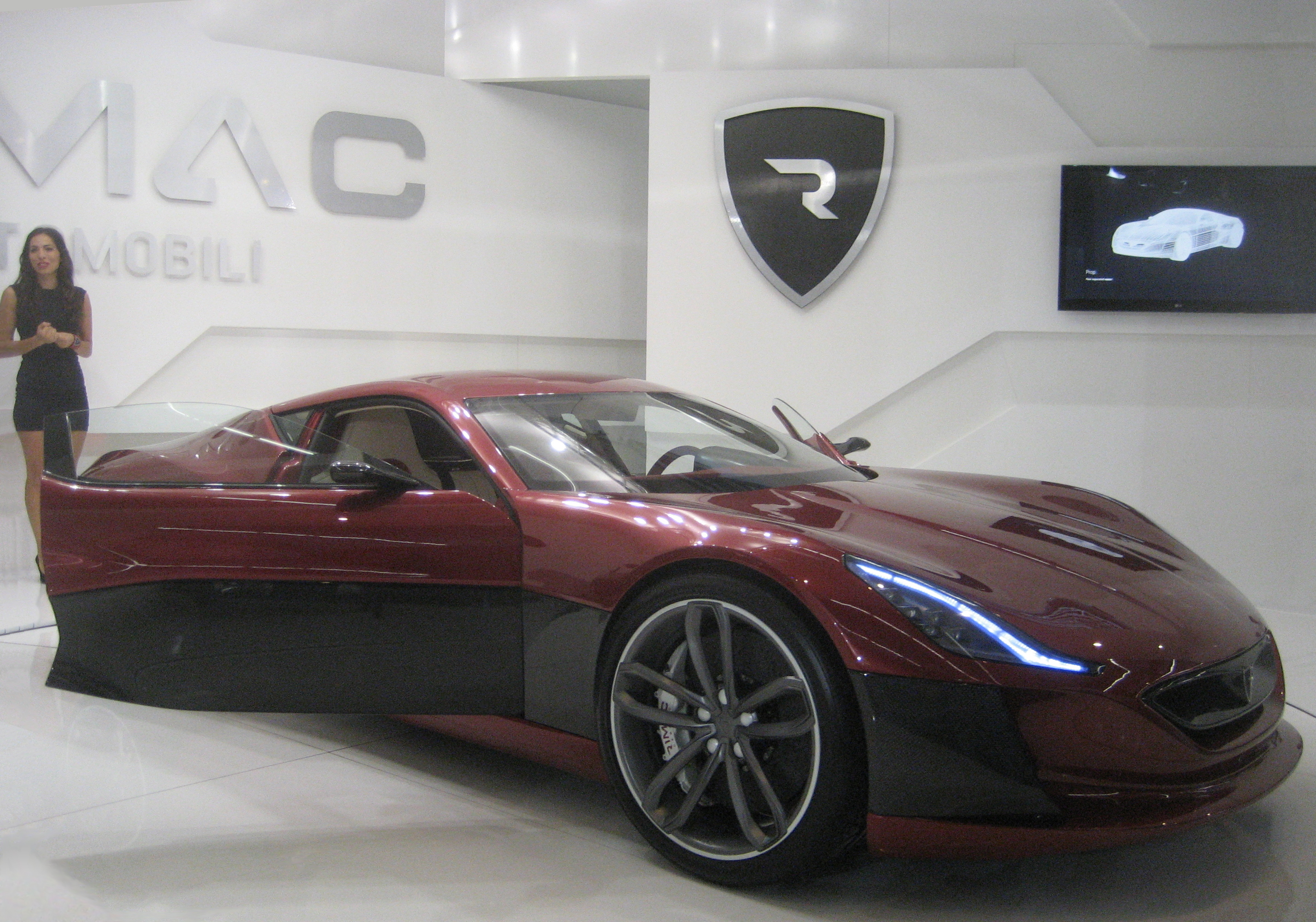
Rimac Concept One at the 2011 Frankfurt Motor Show

The Concept One is an all-electric battery-powered sports car. With a curb weight of 1,850 kg, and a power output of 960 kW (1,305 PS; 1,287 hp), the Concept One can reach 100 km/h from a standstill in 2.6 seconds and continue to accelerate to a top speed of 355 km/h (221 mph). 92 kWh of energy in the battery modules deliver enough energy to permit 600 km of range. The car was first unveiled in 2011 at the Frankfurt Motor Show, when some parts were contracted to other companies. The production version was introduced in 2016.

A production of 88 units was initially stated, which was later limited to 8 units, all of which were sold. The first car was for Spanish company Applus+ IDIADA, called the Volar-e. The second buyer is Paul Runge, one of the shareholders of Rimac automobili.

The battery cells are supplied by Sony, with wheels being supplied by HRE Performance wheels, developed in collaboration with Rimac.

Almost all of the materials are produced in-house, and none of the critical components used in the vehicle are off-the-shelf. The design team includes former designers from Pininfarina and Magna Steyr; the exterior of the car was designed by Croatian designer Adriano Mudri.

==== Concept S ====
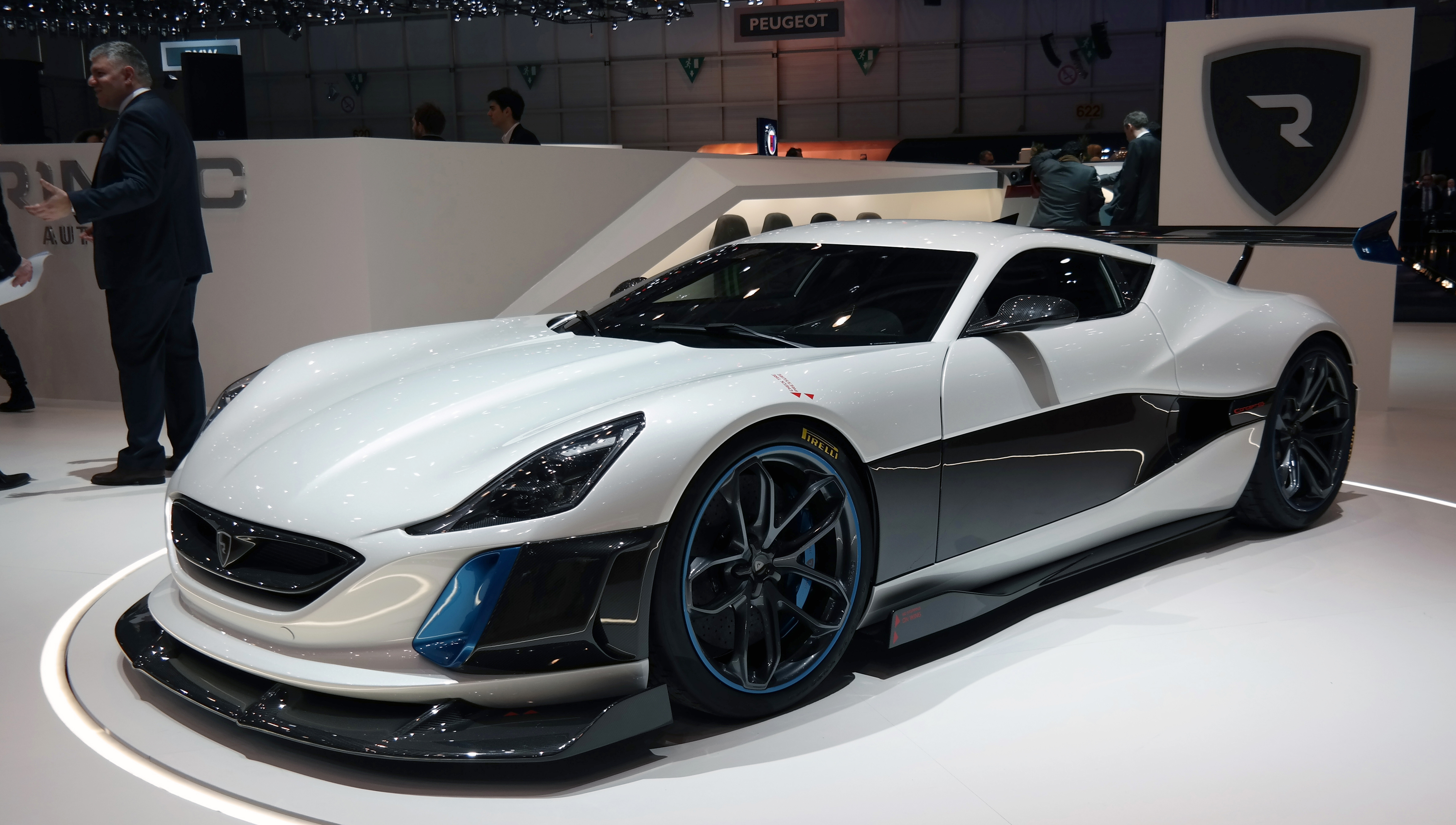
Rimac Concept S at the 2016 Geneva Motor Show

The Concept S is a lighter, more powerful and more aerodynamic, track-oriented update of the Concept One. The four electric motors can deliver 1,032 kW (1,403 PS; 1,384 hp), enabling the Concept S to accelerate from 0–100 km/h (0–62 mph) in 2.5 seconds and reach a top speed of 365 km/h (227 mph).

At the 2017 Geneva Motor Show the company announced the establishment of official dealerships of its brand in Europe, North America and the Middle East, with dealers Manhattan Motorcars, PACE Germany and Al Zarooni Group.

=== Nevera ===
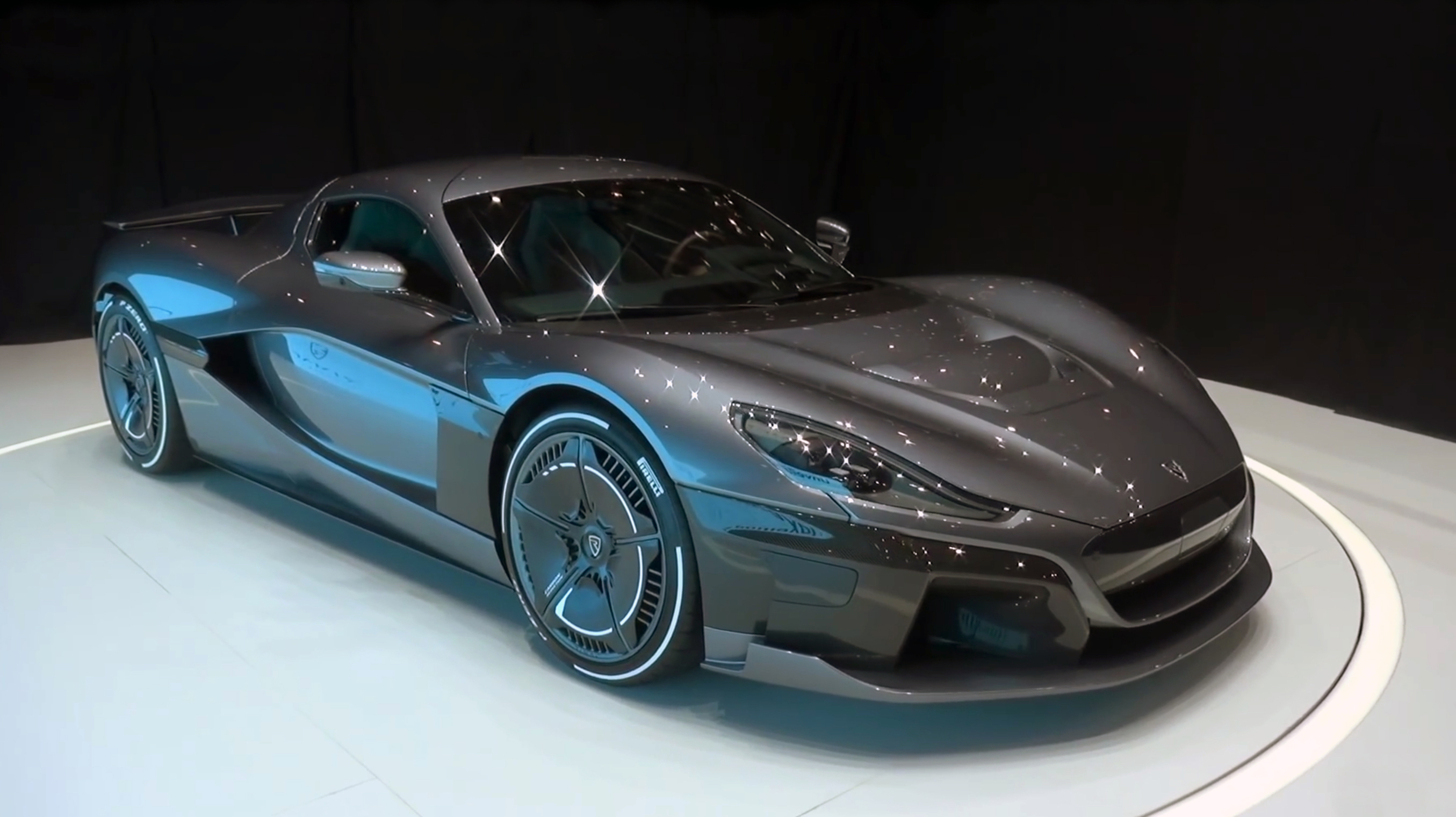
Rimac Concept Two on display at the 2018 Geneva Motor Show

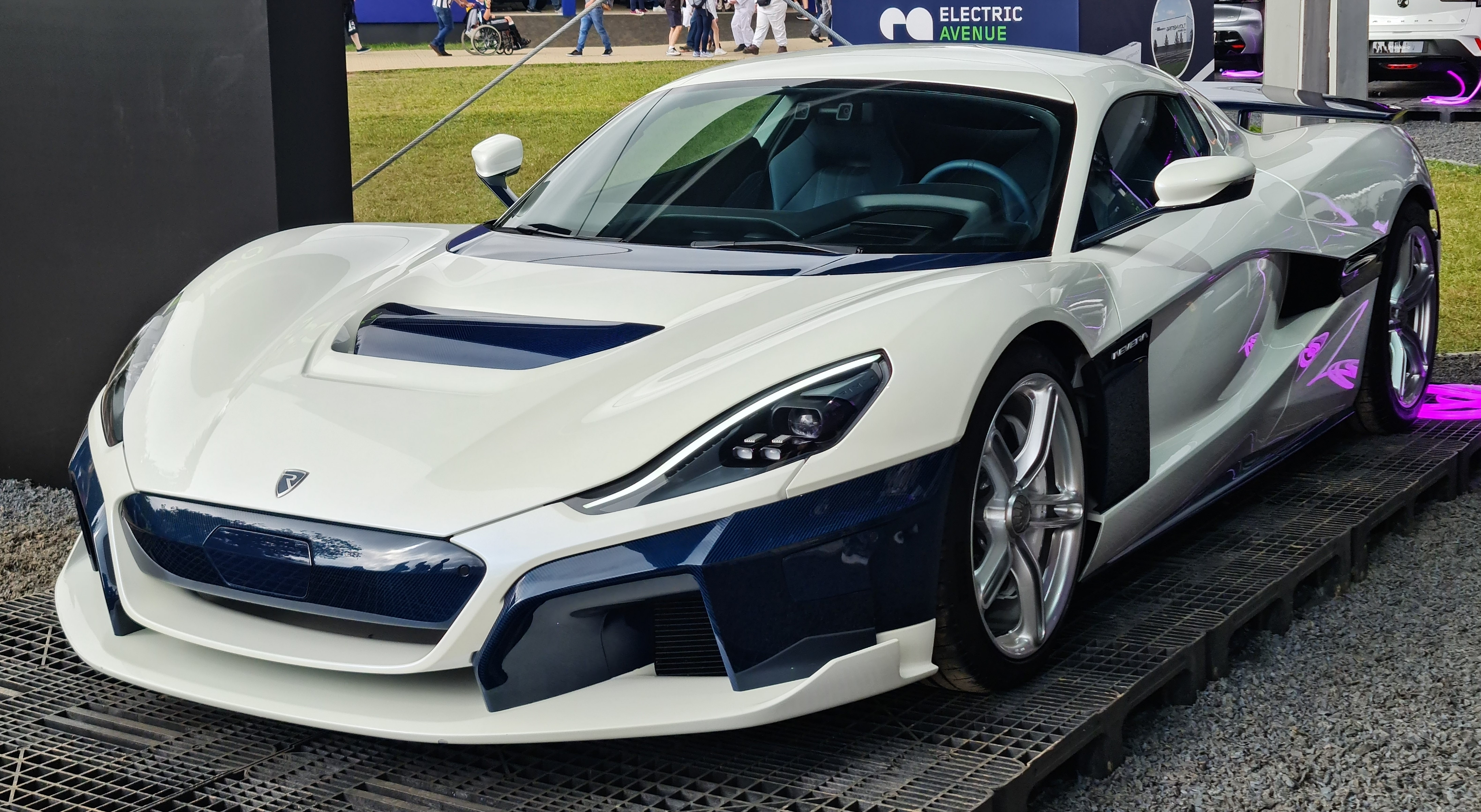
Rimac Nevera at the 2021 Goodwood Festival of Speed

The successor to the Concept One, named Nevera (renamed from Concept Two, styled as C_Two), was unveiled at the March 2018 Geneva Motor Show. The car has an entirely new design with butterfly doors and various power upgrades. The four updated electric motors produce a total of 1,427 kW (1,940 PS; 1,914 hp) and 2,360 N⋅m (1,741 lb⋅ft) of torque. The carbon fibre body construction results in a total weight of 2,150 kg (4,740 lb), including the heavy battery packs. The Nevera claims to be able to accelerate from 0–97 km/h (60 mph) in 1.85 seconds and achieve a top speed of 415 km/h (258 mph).

The car incorporates a fully independent torque vectoring system (R-AWTV) to improve handling and also includes many high-tech features such as a facial recognition system that would unlock the ignition only for the owner and adjust the car's settings according to the owner's mood. The car has a high-speed "drift mode", with an intelligent traction control system keeping the car under control. The Nevera will have Level 4 self-driving capability, according to Mate Rimac; it has eight cameras, a LIDAR, six radars, and twelve ultrasonic sensors. The production of the vehicle will be limited to 150 units.

Rimac debuted the Nevera California edition at the August 2018 Pebble Beach Concours d'Elegance. It comes in a one-off shade of blue, with new wheel design, and is supplied with six liters of champagne and two flutes in the boot of the car.

=== Scalatan VISION 2080 ===
This is a concept car designed for the year 2080. It was the car that won Rimac Automobili's Instagram design contest in May 2020. It's believed to have over 2,200 kW (3,000 hp). It was designed by Maximilian Schneider.

== Component manufacturing ==
Rimac Technology produces battery systems for Aston Martin's new sports car, the Valkyrie. The company also produces battery systems for Koenigsegg (specifically for the Regera), Jaguar E‑type Zero concept car and SEAT Cupra e-Racer concept car. In 2018, it entered a technical partnership with Automobili Pininfarina, whose first car, the Battista, is said to be based on the same architecture and uses the same powertrain as the Nevera.

Rimac is also involved in the production of drivetrains and other components for race car drivers, such as Nobuhiro Tajima, with whom it debuted with the joint all-electric car "Tajima Rimac E-Runner Concept_One" at the 2015 Pikes Peak International Hill Climb. The car finished the race in second position, ahead of all internal combustion engine cars.

The Applus+ IDIADA Volar-E is also an example of a product developed for another company.

== Other projects ==
In 2014, it was announced that Rimac Automobili is building the first fast electric yacht in the world.

After 4 years of testing Rimac announced the Verne robotaxi concept in June 2024. Verne will be an independent brand for robotaxi's that will operate in urban environments. The vehicle utilizes LIDAR and computer vision for navigation and lacks any form of driving input from the occupants. Passengers sit in 2 reclining seats and their experience is customised through a phone app. Verne are planning to launch with 500 vehicles in Zagreb in 2026, with an expansion into the UK to follow in 2027.

== See also ==
- NIO EP9
- RAESR
- Mercedes-EQ A
- Aspark Owl
- Volkswagen I.D. R
