= Bugatti Automobiles =

French high-performance luxury automobile manufacturer

Coordinates: 48°31′36″N 7°29′59″E

Bugatti Automobiles S.A.S.
- Logotype used since 2022

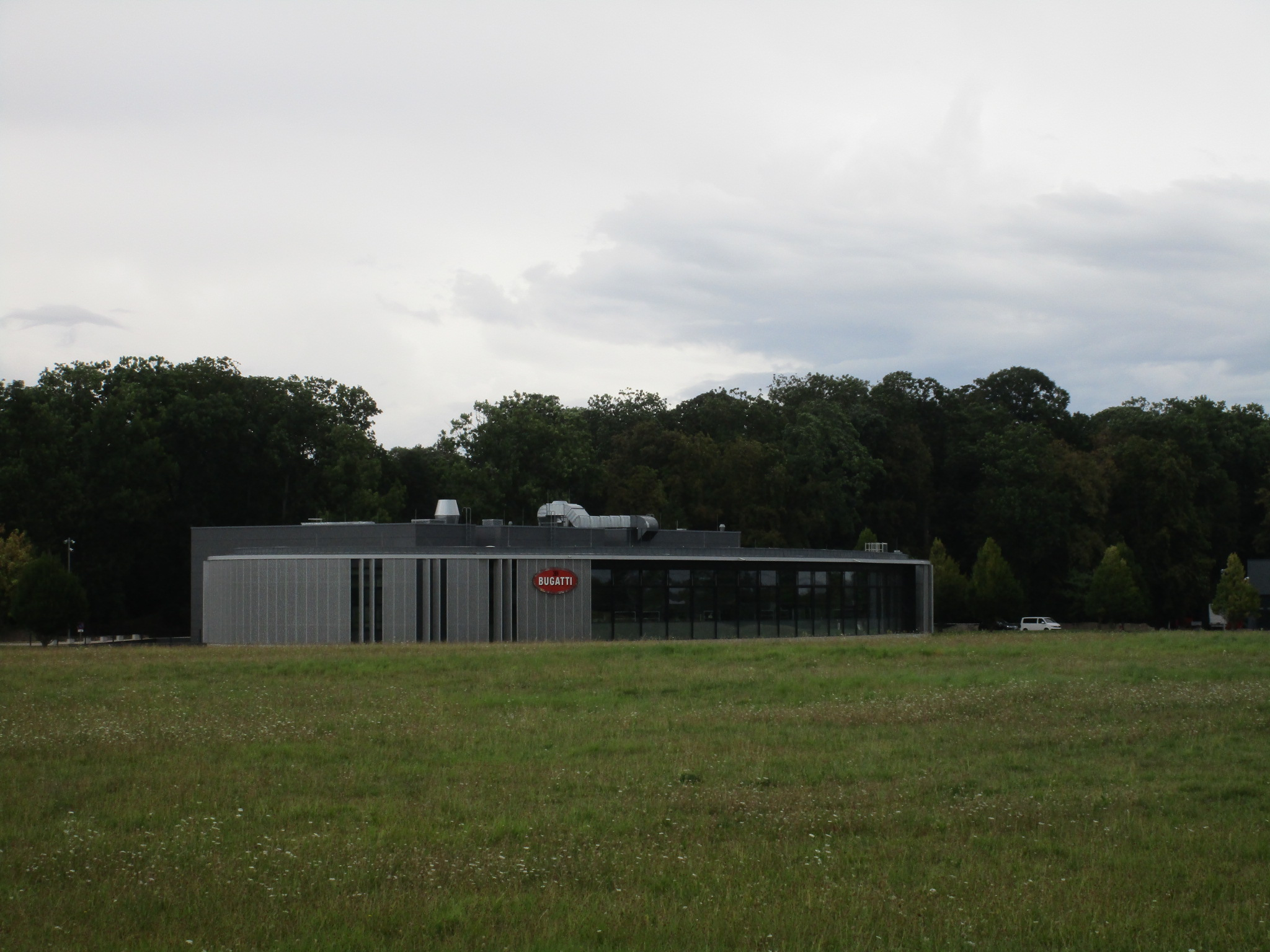
- Headquarters in Molsheim, France
- Type: Subsidiary (S.A.S.)
- Industry: Automotive
- Predecessor: Bugatti Automobili S.p.A.
- Founded: 22 December 1998; 27 years ago
- Headquarters: Molsheim, France
- Area served: Worldwide
- Key people: Mate Rimac (CEO of Bugatti Rimac); Christophe Piochon (President of Bugatti brand)
- Products: Sports cars
- Production output: ▲76 vehicles (2018)
- Revenue: ▲€319.5 million (2021)
- Net income: ▲€8.4 million (2021)
- Number of employees: 1100 (2026)
- Parent: Bugatti Rimac
- Subsidiaries: Bugatti Engineering GmbH; Bugatti International S.A.
- Website: www.bugatti.com

Bugatti Automobiles S.A.S. (French: [bygati]) is a French luxury sports car manufacturer. The company was founded in 1998 as a subsidiary of the Volkswagen Group and is based in Molsheim, Alsace, France. The company makes a variety of two-seater and track-only cars.

The original Bugatti automobile brand was established by Ettore Bugatti (1881–1947) in 1909 at Molsheim and built sports, racing and luxury cars.

In November 2021, the company became part of Bugatti Rimac, a joint venture between Rimac Group and Porsche AG. Since 1 November 2021, the company has been led by Mate Rimac as chief executive officer of Bugatti Rimac.

== History ==
On 22 December 1998, Volkswagen AG, a German automotive manufacturer now controlled by Porsche SE, established Bugatti Automobiles S.A.S. as a French-registered, wholly-owned subsidiary. On the same day, the company took over the design and naming rights to Bugatti from Italian businessman Romano Artioli, who built supercars (such as the EB 110 and EB 112) with Bugatti Automobili S.p.A. in Italy between 1987 and 1998. Since 2000, the Bugatti automobile brand has officially existed as Bugatti Automobiles S.A.S., still abbreviated to Bugatti. Since then, the company's headquarters have once again been located in Molsheim, France.

On 22 December 2000, Volkswagen officially incorporated Bugatti Automobiles S.A.S., with former VW drivetrain chief Karl-Heinz Neumann as president. The company purchased the 1856 Château Saint-Jean, formerly Ettore Bugatti's guest house in Dorlisheim, near Molsheim, and began refurbishing it to serve as the company's headquarters. The original factory was still in the hands of Snecma, who were unwilling to part with it. At the Pebble Beach Concours d'Elegance in August 2000, VW announced that they would instead build a new modern atelier (factory) next to and south of the château. The atelier was officially inaugurated on 3 September 2005.

In September 2020, it was announced that Volkswagen was preparing to sell its Bugatti automobile brand, and talks began with the Croatian company Rimac Automobili. Around 700 Bugatti cars had been sold since 2005, but Volkswagen Group CEO Herbert Diess saw the unprofitable brand as ballast, the company said.

In 2020, Bugatti delivered 77 vehicles to customers. In January 2021, Bugatti announced that it had increased its operating profit for the third year in a row. This marked the most successful year in the company's history.

In July 2021, it was announced that Bugatti Automobiles and the sports car operations of Rimac Automobili would be merged to form Bugatti Rimac, a joint venture between Rimac Group and Porsche AG. The newly formed Rimac Group would be the majority shareholder with a 55% stake in Bugatti Rimac, while Porsche AG would hold the remaining 45% stake, as well as a 24% stake in Rimac Group. The formation of Bugatti Rimac d.o.o. took place in the fourth quarter of 2021.

After years of building one-offs and limited edition models, in December 2021, Bugatti officially created its own bespoke division – Sur Mesure. The phrase means 'tailored' in French.

== Leadership ==
- Romano Artioli (1998–2000)
- Karl-Heinz Neumann (2000–2003)
- Thomas Bscher (2003–2007)
- Franz-Josef Paefgen (2007–2011)
- Wolfgang Dürheimer (2011–2017)
- Stephan Winkelmann (2018–2021)
- Mate Rimac (2021–present)

== Concept cars ==
=== Italdesign Giugiaro designs ===
Volkswagen commissioned Italdesign's Giorgetto Giugiaro to design a series of concept cars to return the marque to prominence. The first example, the EB 118, was a two-door coupé and was introduced at the Paris Motor Show in 1998. It was followed by the four-door EB 218 touring sedan, introduced at the Geneva Motor Show in 1999. Later that year, the 18/3 Chiron was shown at the IAA in Frankfurt.

=== Volkswagen designs ===
Volkswagen designed the final Bugatti concept, the EB 18/4 GT in-house. Bugatti introduced the EB 18/4 at the 1999 Tokyo Motor Show.

=== W18 engine ===
All of these early concepts featured a 555 PS (408 kW; 547 hp) 18-cylinder engine. This was the first-ever W-configuration engine on a passenger vehicle, with three blocks of 6 cylinders each. It shared many components with Volkswagen's modular engine family.

=== 16C Galibier ===
The 16C Galibier was unveiled during the Celebration of the Centenary of the Marque in Molsheim. The presentation was only for Bugatti customers. The car show in Molsheim showed the car in blue carbon fibre and aluminum parts. One year later Bugatti showed the world the 16C Galibier Concept at "VW Group Night" at the Geneva Auto Show in a new black and aluminum color combination.

The Galibier, a 1020 HP sedan, was first shown as a concept in 2010 and when they planned to put it into production in 2015, it would have cost about $1.4 million. It would use the same 16-cylinder 8.0-litre engine as the Veyron but instead of four turbos, the 16C Galibier would instead use two superchargers to deliver better torque. Production would require new facilities in Molsheim, France, to be refitted, which pushed back potential deliveries until 2015.

In 2013, it was announced that the car will never be produced as they wish to focus on a Veyron replacement.

== Production cars ==
=== Veyron ===
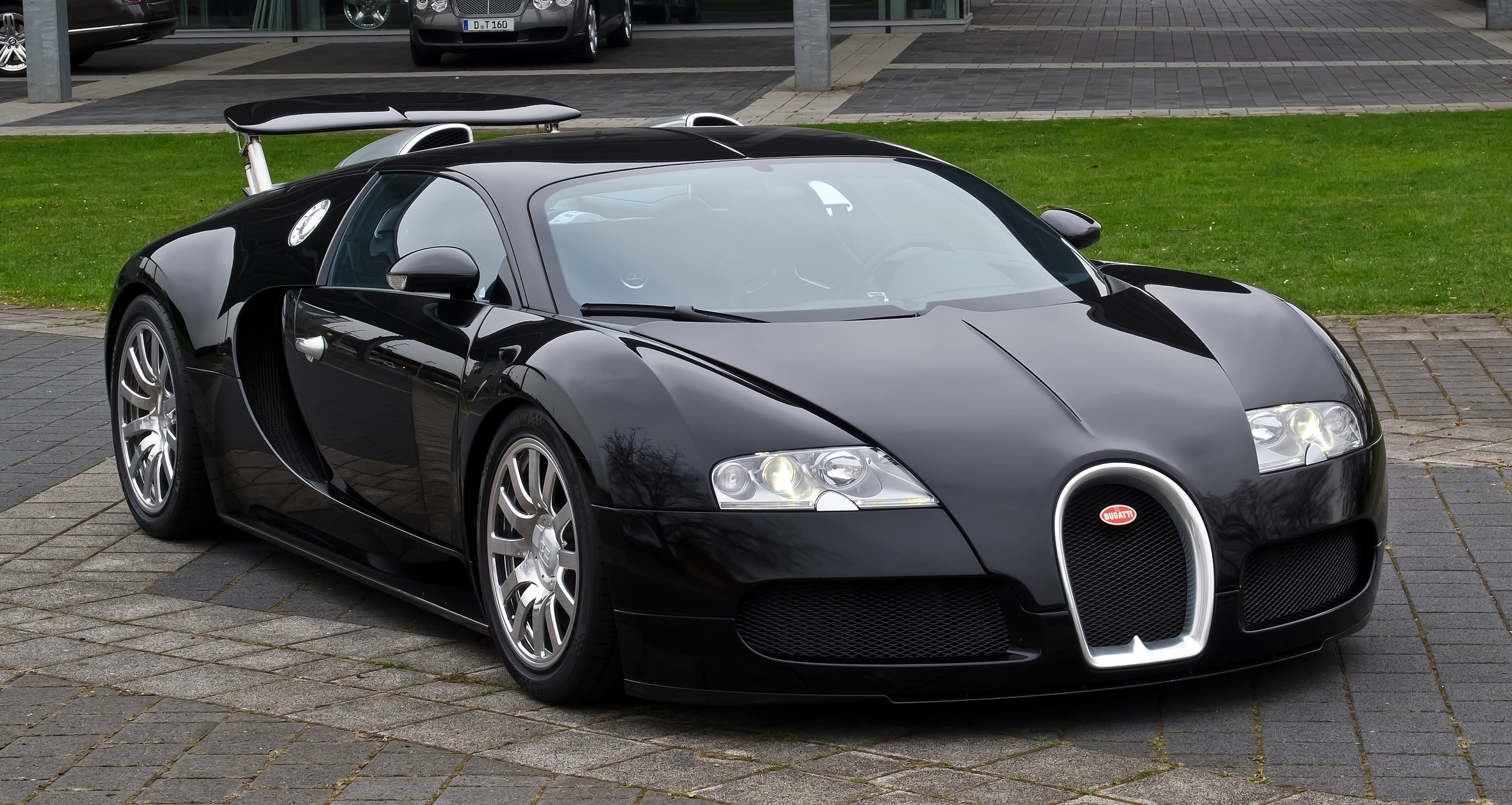
Bugatti Veyron

In 2000, the company introduced a new engine concept. At the Paris, Geneva, and Detroit auto shows, Bugatti presented the EB 16/4 Veyron concept car, an all-wheel-drive 16-cylinder car with an engine output of 1,001 PS (736 kW; 987 hp). The EB 16/4 Veyron has an 8.0-liter engine with four turbochargers. It reached a top speed of 407 km/h (253 mph). At the time, the Veyron was the fastest supercar ever built. In acceleration tests, it reached a speed of 100 km/h (62 mph) after 2.5 s, 200 km/h (124 mph) after 7.3 s, and 300 km/h (186 mph) after 16.8 s.

Development initially lasted until 2001; the EB 16/4 Veyron was given "advanced concept" status in advertising. At the end of 2001, Bugatti announced that the car was now officially called the Bugatti Veyron 16.4. The combination of numbers means 16 cylinders and a fourth design study. Initially, production was scheduled to start in 2003. Technical difficulties with the dual-clutch transmission and the unusual, extreme requirements at speeds well over 300 km/h led to several delays. Finally, production began in September 2005, and annual production was increased to 70 units due to long waiting times.

On 26 June 2010, the Bugatti Veyron 16.4 Super Sport set the world speed record for road-legal production sports cars with a top speed of 431.072 km/h (267.86 mph). In August of the same year, this vehicle with 1,200 PS (883 kW; 1,184 hp) was presented for the first time in Pebble Beach (U.S.). In April 2013, the Veyron 16.4 Grand Sport Vitesse reached 408.84 km/h (254.04 mph), the fastest speed ever recorded for a roadster. The Vitesse World Record Car Edition, limited to eight units, was subsequently presented to the world public for the first time at the Auto Shanghai trade show and sold out shortly after that.

At the 2015 IAA, the company unveiled a show car of its Vision Gran Turismo project. With the Bugatti Vision Gran Turismo, the luxury manufacturer presented a possible new super sports car following the sale of all 450 Veyron. The Bugatti Vision Gran Turismo design is intended to recall the racing tradition of the 1920s and 1930s. The color scheme represents the brand's victories in the Le Mans 24-hour race. On 6 November 2015, the first showrooms in Bugatti's new CI look were opened simultaneously.

=== Chiron ===
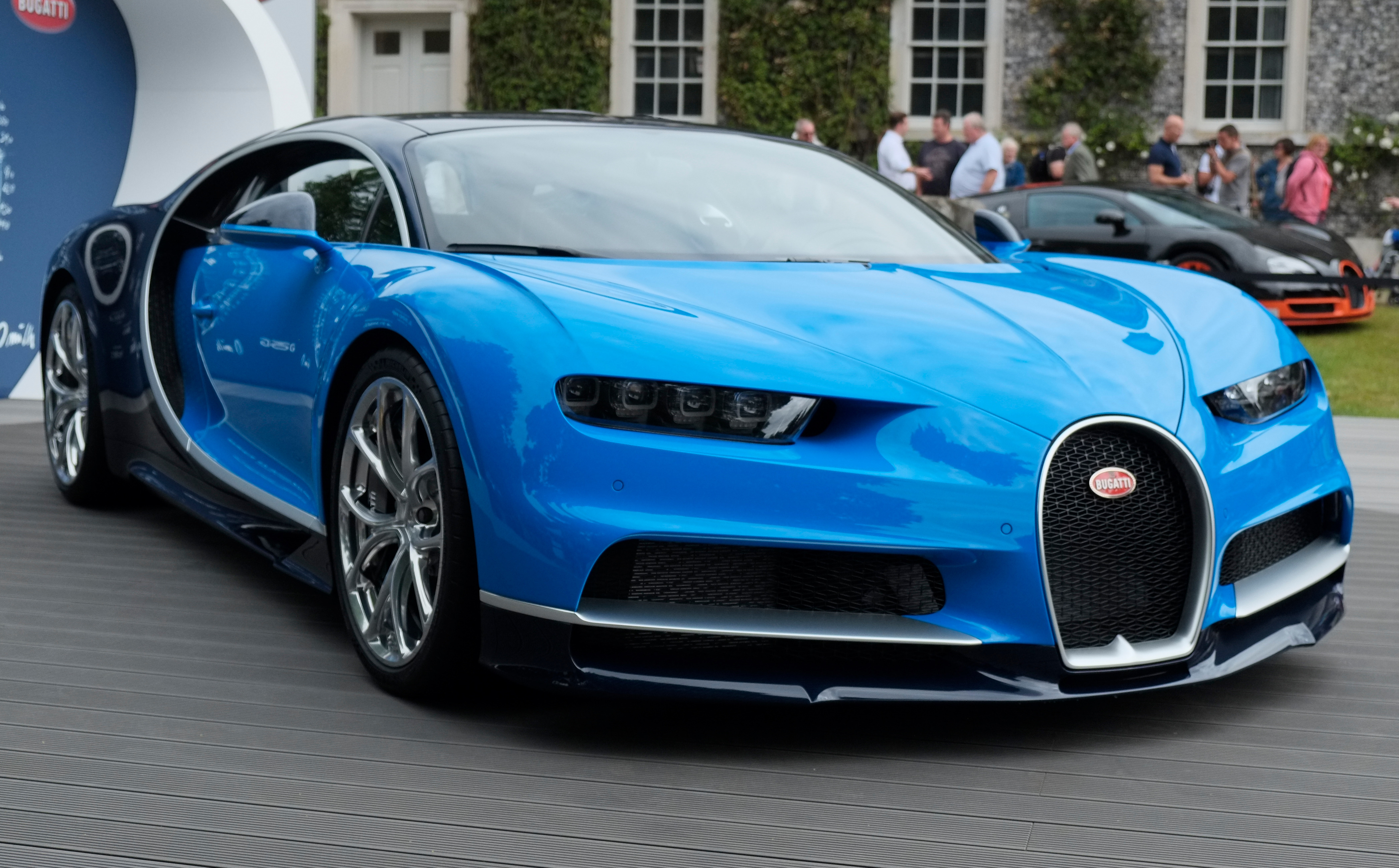
Bugatti Chiron

On 30 November 2015, Bugatti announced that the successor to the Veyron would be called the Chiron. The name is dedicated to the Monegasque racing driver Louis Chiron, who began his racing career on a Bugatti Type 35 and won several Grand Prix races. On 29 February 2016, Bugatti unveiled its new Chiron at the Geneva Motor Show. It continues to be powered by an 8.0-liter 16-cylinder with four turbochargers, but now with 1,500 PS (1,103 kW; 1,479 hp) and 1,600 Newton meters of torque. The Chiron accelerates to 100 km/h (62 mph) in 2.4 seconds from a standstill, reaches 200 km/h (124 mph) in 6.1 seconds, and 300 km/h (186 mph) in 13.1 seconds. The top speed is 420 km/h (261 mph).

This makes the Chiron the fastest production car globally, and its base price is 2.4 million euros (2.53 US$) net. Production in Molsheim is limited to 500 vehicles, and the first production car was delivered to customers in March 2017. The Chiron made its debut on the US market in April 2016. On 21 August 2016, Bugatti unveiled the Vision Gran Turismo concept car, a real-life study of the vehicle in the Gran Turismo Sport video game. On 11 September 2017, the Chiron set a new world record. From 0 to 400 km/h (249 mph) and back to 0 km/h (0 mph), the coupé took just 42 seconds.

The BBC's TopGear magazine named the Chiron "hypercar of the year" on 27 November 2017, and a month later, the Chiron also received the award from Evo magazine in the UK.

At the Geneva Motor Show on 6 March 2018, Bugatti unveiled the Chiron Sport, a version of the Chiron optimized for lateral acceleration. It takes 5 seconds off the Chiron's lap time on the Nardò handling circuit thanks to numerous changes, such as the increased use of new materials (the first production car with windshield wipers made of carbon), the resulting weight saving of 18 kilograms, and the new Dynamic Torque Vectoring function. The engine remains untouched, producing 1,103 kW (1,479 hp) and 1,600 Newton-meters of torque, as in the Chiron. In June 2018, Lego Technic recreated a 1:8 scale Chiron with Lego bricks.

In November 2018, Lego collaborated with Bugatti to design a 1:1 scale Chiron made of Lego bricks. The full-size Lego Technic Chiron was constructed from over 1,000,000 Lego pieces, produced an estimated 5.3 horsepower and 92Nm of torque, could travel at speeds of up to 20 kph, and required over 13,000 work hours to design and construct.

In 2019, Bugatti rang in its 110th anniversary with the unique "110ans" edition of the Chiron Sport. The car adorns the Tricolore inside and out as a nod to France. The powertrain remains the 8-liter 16-cylinder with four turbochargers and 1,103 kW/1,500 hp. The vehicle was first shown at the Geneva Motor Show.

In July 2019, Bugatti built the 200th Chiron, as "110 ans Bugatti".

In September 2019, Bugatti broke through the 300 mph barrier with a modified Chiron, breaking the top speed record. Ex-racing driver and test driver Andy Wallace reached 304.773 mph (490.485 km/h) on the VW test track in Ehra-Lessien. The Chiron thus becomes the first production car to exceed 300 mph (483 km/h).

Bugatti celebrated its 110th birthday with customers and friends of the brand at the Grand Fête in Molsheim in September 2019 and unveiled the Chiron Super Sport 300+ as part of the celebration. The car, which has been boosted to 1,600 hp, has a body optimized for top speed and was limited to 30 units. One vehicle cost 3.5 million euros (3.69 million US$).

The French introduced another derivative, the Chiron Pur Sport, in March 2020. The new model was developed and designed with lateral dynamics in mind. To achieve this, the engineers modified the chassis, engine, transmission, and aerodynamics. A new transmission improved with a 15 percent shorter overall ratio; total power is available at 350 km/h (217 mph). The Chiron Pur Sport accelerates from 0 to 100 km/h (62 mph) in 2.3 seconds instead of 2.4 seconds, and 0 to 200 km/h (124 mph) now takes 5.9 seconds instead of 6.1 seconds. The vehicle's top speed is electronically governed at 350 km/h (217 mph), and the maximum gearshift speed is 6,900 rpm. At the rear, the Chiron Pur Sport carries a 1.90-meter-wide rear wing for massive downforce. A new chassis set-up with stiffer springs at the front and back, a control strategy for the adaptive dampers designed for performance, and modified camber values ensured more dynamic handling and greater agility in corners. The Chiron Pur Sport is limited to 60 vehicles and costs 3 million euros each (3.6 million US$). The first vehicle was delivered in August 2020.

In September, Bugatti presented the special Chiron Sport model "Les Légendes du Ciel." Limited to 20 units, the edition is dedicated to Bugatti's legendary pilots and works drivers. Each vehicle costs 2.88 (3.04 million US$) million euros net.

=== Divo ===
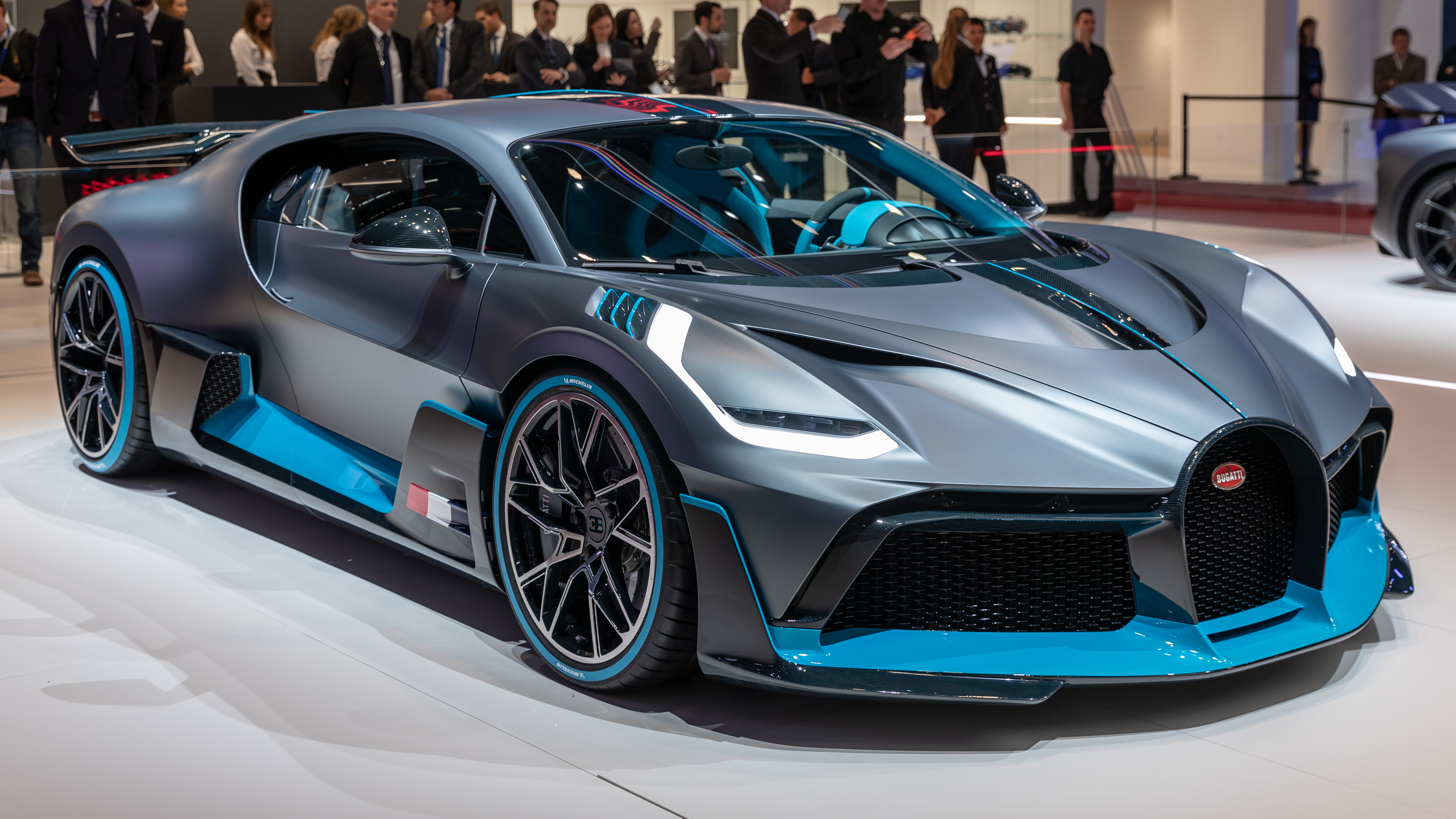
Bugatti Divo at the 2019 Geneva Motor Show

In July 2018, Bugatti announced that it would build 40 units of the Divo, a track-focused vehicle based on the Chiron. The cars, at a net unit price of €5 million (5.27 million US$), were sold within days. In August 2018, the Divo was shown to the public for the first time at "The Quail: A Motorsports Gathering" as part of Monterey Car Week. With the Divo, Bugatti began modern coachbuilding.

=== La Voiture Noire ===
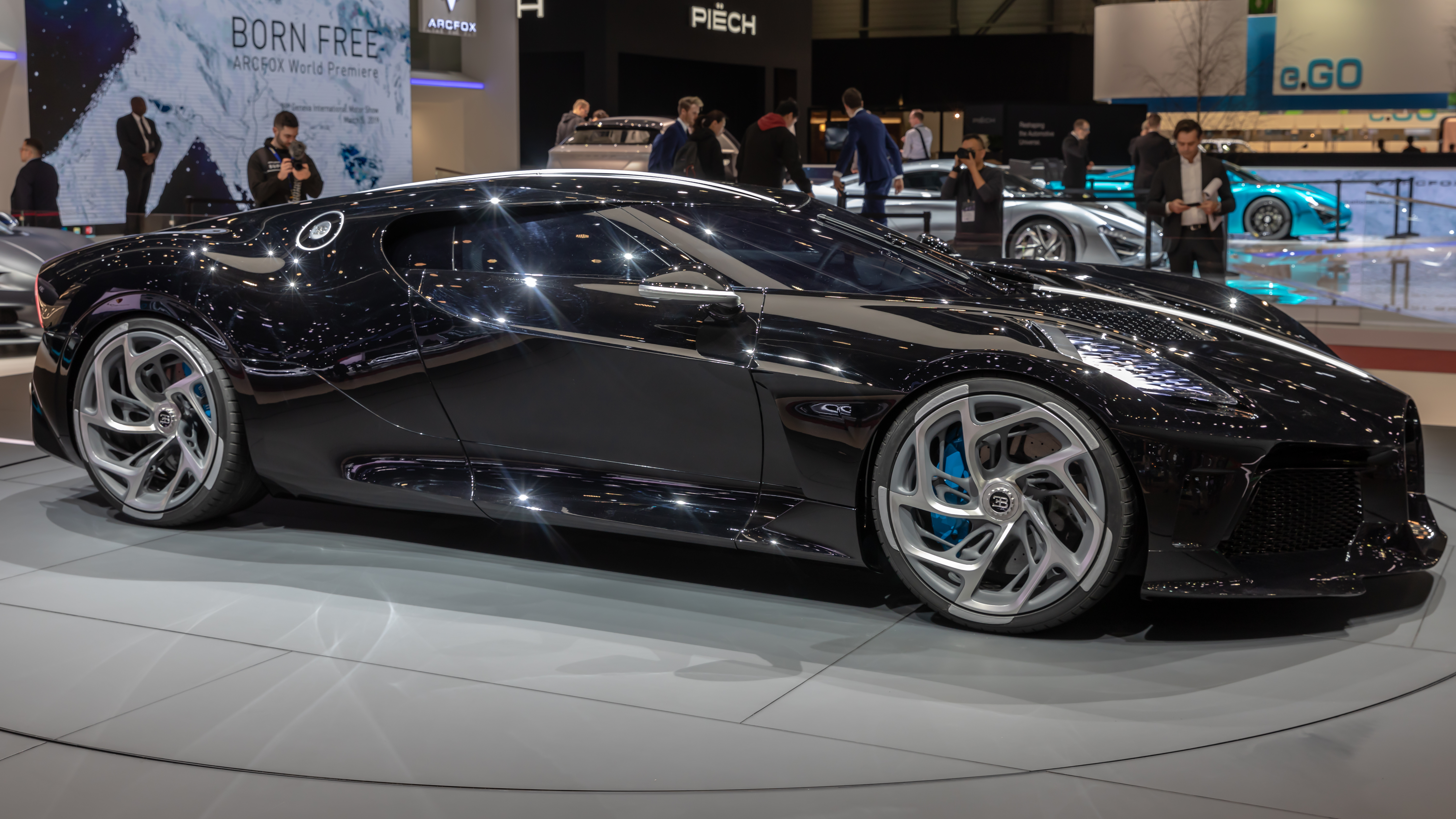
Bugatti La Voiture Noire

The La Voiture Noire (The Black Car) is a one-off special edition model based on the Chiron and introduced in 2019 at the Geneva Motor Show. The car pays homage to the legendary 'missing' Bugatti Type 57 SC Atlantic of Jean Bugatti. It was sold for US$13.4 million, making it the third most expensive car sold first-hand.

=== Centodieci ===
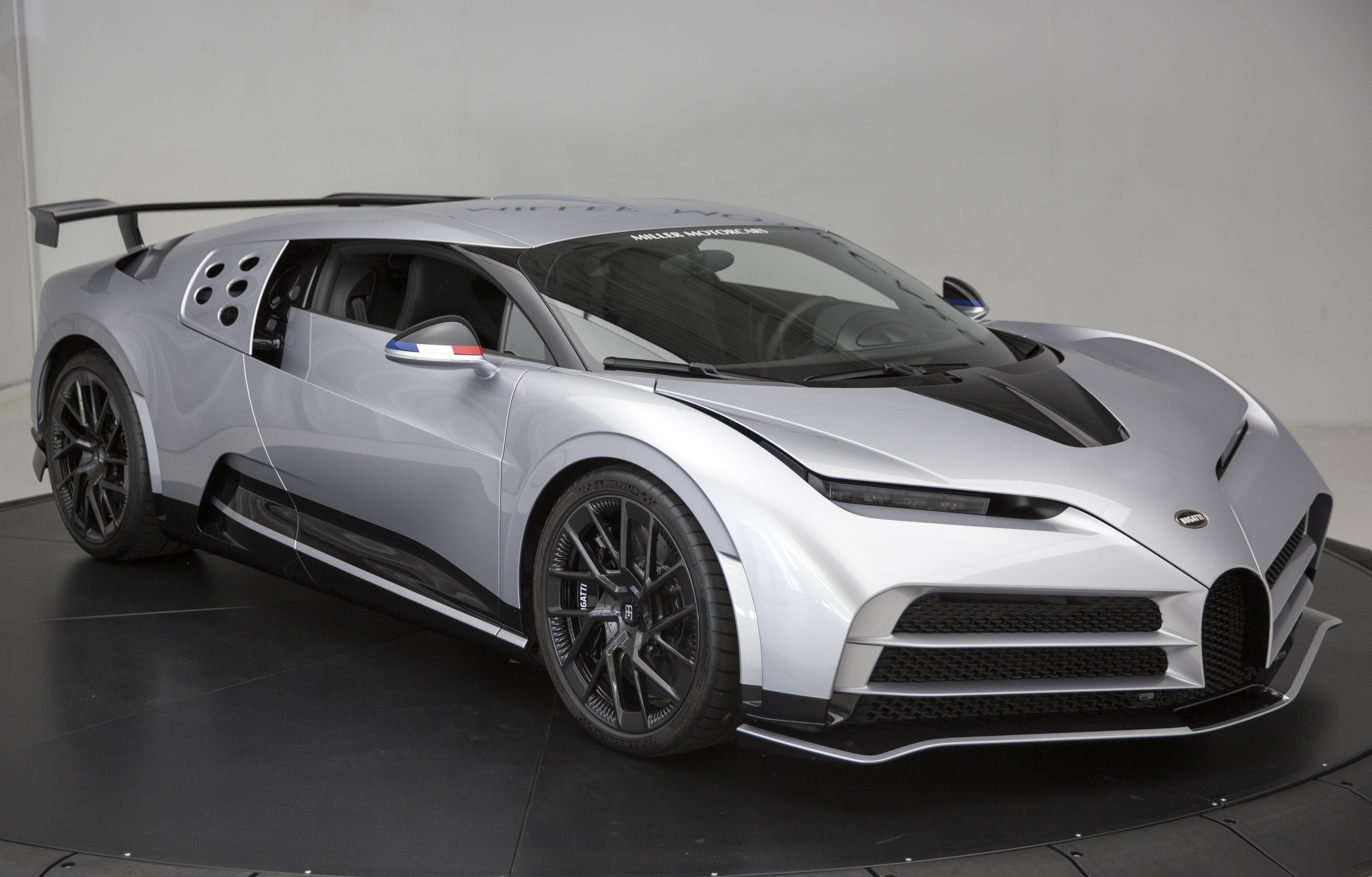
Bugatti Centodieci

In August 2019, Bugatti presented the "Centodieci" (Italian for 110) at "The Quail: A Motorsports Gathering" as part of Monterey Car Week. The car "reinterprets the historic EB 110." It is based on the Chiron with its 8.0-liter W16 engine, but is upgraded to produce 1,600 PS (1,177 kW; 1,578 hp) at 7,000 rpm. An additional air intake in the area of the oil cooler regulates the temperature of the performance-enhanced engine. The Centodieci can accelerate from 0 to 100 km/h (62 mph) in 2.4 seconds, to 200 km/h (124 mph) in 6.1 seconds and 300 km/h (186 mph) in 13.1 seconds, with the top speed, electronically limited to 380 km/h (236 mph). Visually, its wedge shape is based on the EB 110. The small series, limited to ten vehicles at a unit price of eight million euros (9 million US$), was sold immediately.

=== Bolide ===
Bugatti Bolide

The Bolide is Bugatti's first track-only sports car under Volkswagen ownership, digitally unveiled in October 2020. Built around Bugatti's existing 8.0-liter W16 engine, the engineers sought to reduce the bodywork to a minimum, resulting in a compact body shell. Although the concept version had a power output of 1,361 kW (1,825 hp; 1,850 PS), this was achieved using 110-octane racing fuel. The production version has a power output of 1,177 kW; 1,578 hp (1,600 PS) at 7,050 rpm with a torque figure of 1,600 N⋅m (1,180 lb⋅ft) at 2,250 rpm using 98 RON gas. The top speed is expected to be over 500 km/h (311 mph). As part of its Monterey Car Week announcement, Bugatti has said that it will build 40 production-spec Bolide models. Currently, the car is being pushed through the final stages of its development programme, but Bugatti aims to commence deliveries in 2024. Prices will start from €4 million ($4.25 million).

=== Mistral ===
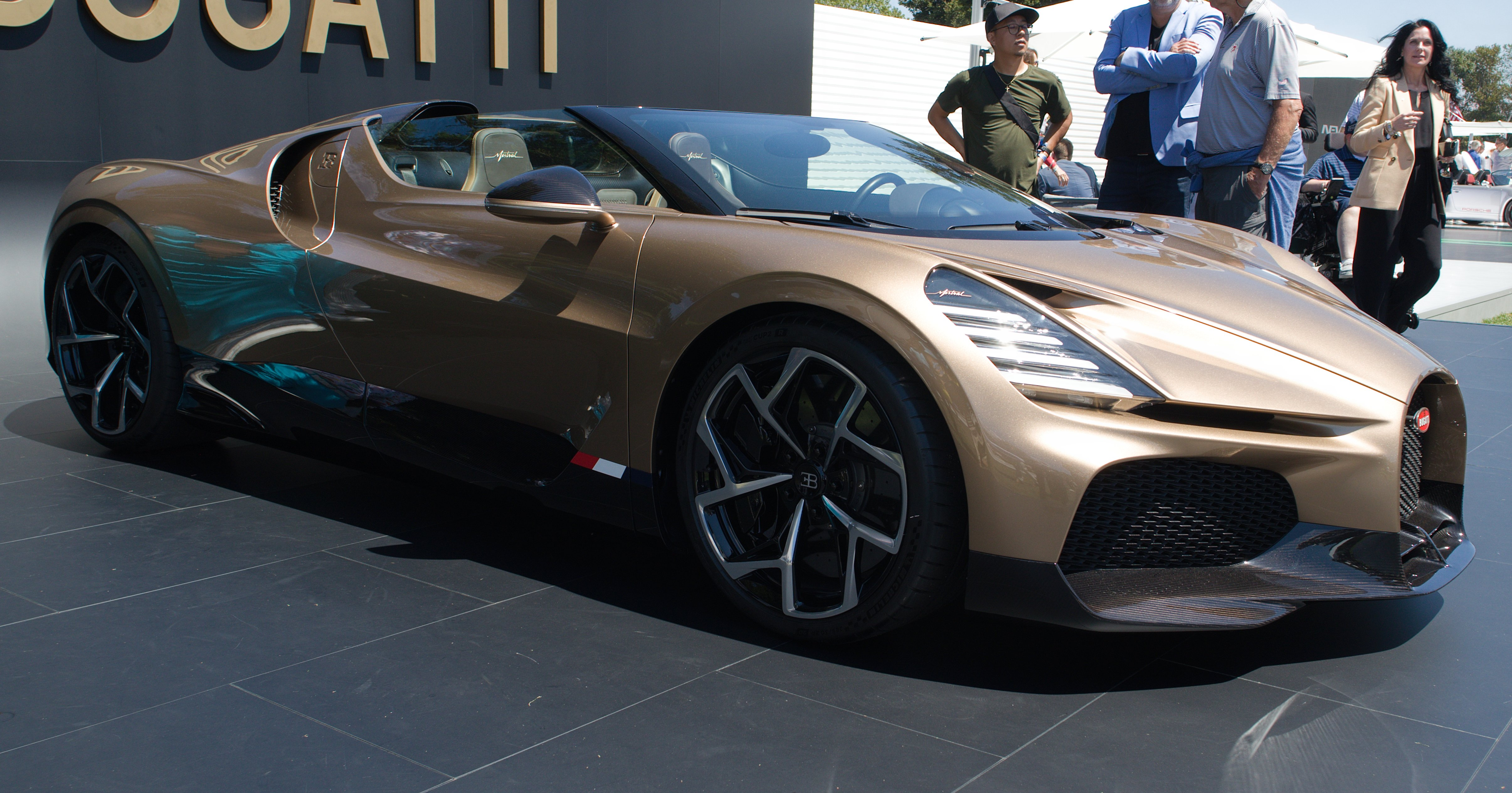
Bugatti Mistral at The Quail 2023

The Mistral was unveiled on 19 August 2022 and is claimed by Bugatti to be the fastest roadster in the world. Although the Mistral is based on the Chiron platform, the Mistral is not a cabriolet model for the Bugatti Chiron, but a unique roadster model for Bugatti that marks the last vehicle to use the W16 engine that was introduced with the Bugatti Veyron in 2005.

=== Tourbillon ===
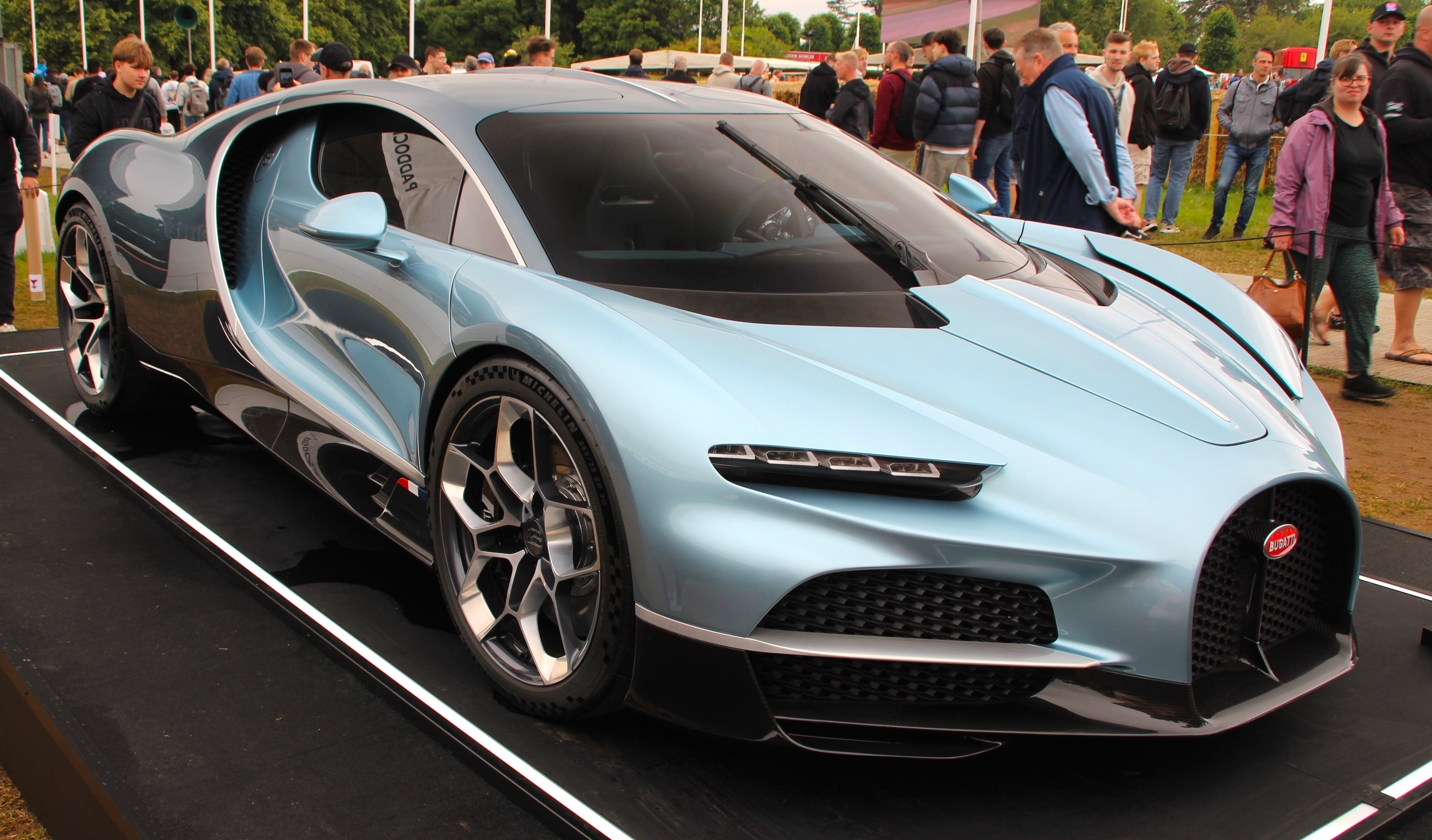
Bugatti Tourbillon at the 2024 Goodwood Festival of Speed

On 20 June 2024, Bugatti announced that the successor to the Chiron would be called the Tourbillon. It is the first Bugatti to use a hybrid powertrain, and the first production Bugatti since the EB110 to not use a W16 engine, instead being powered by a Cosworth-engineered naturally aspirated V16 engine paired with a 3 motor hybrid system, producing a total output of 1,800 PS (1,324 kW; 1,775 hp). Bugatti said that the choice to replace the quad turbocharger setup of the Chiron with a naturally aspirated engine was to make the experience "more emotional" and allow for a higher rev count, with the engine redlining at 9,000 rpm. The car is inspired by mechanical watches, and is named after the Tourbillon mechanism found in some high end watches. Production is planned to be limited to 250 examples.

== Innovations ==
In 2019, the French manufacturer unveiled a titanium brake caliper, the largest titanium component produced through additive manufacturing with regard to its volume.

== Awards ==
Bugatti retrospectively received three design awards in December 2019 for its exhibition stands in Geneva: Automotive Brand Contest and Iconic Awards. At the German Design Award, Bugatti became "Winner" in the category "Excellent Architecture - Fair and Exhibition." At the Top Gear Award, the Bugatti Super Sport 300+ won the 2019 "Physics Lesson of the year" category. At the Auto Bild Sportscars Award in the same year, the car was judged the best sports car of the year in the "Super Sports Car Import" category.

Bugatti changed its corporate design in February 2020. The first showroom with the new look opened in Paris. The partner was Groupe Schumacher, founded in 1947 and specializing in supercars and hypercars. In the same month, Bugatti reported that 250 vehicles of the Chiron had now been built, exactly half the planned number.

== See also ==
- List of car brands
- Supercar
