= Pininfarina B95 =

Electric sports car

Overview
- Manufacturer: Automobili Pininfarina
- Production: 2025–present (10 units planned)
- Assembly: Italy: Cambiano
- Designer: Davide Loris Amantea at Pininfarina

Body and chassis
- Class: Sports car (S)
- Body style: 2-door speedster
- Layout: Individual-wheel drive

Powertrain
- Electric motor: 4 liquid-cooled permanent magnet synchronous electric motors placed at each wheel
- Power output: 1,400 kW (1,900 hp; 1,900 PS)
- Battery: Rimac 120 kW⋅h Lithium Nickel Manganese Cobalt Oxide (LiNiMnCoO_{2})
- Electric range: 476 km (300 miles)

Dimensions
- Curb weight: 2,200 kg (4,850 lb)

The Pininfarina B95 is an electric performance car manufactured by Automobili Pininfarina GmbH which is headquartered in Munich, Germany, with roots in the Italian car design firm and coachbuilder Pininfarina. It is scheduled to enter production in 2025.

== History ==
The commercial success of the Battista model encouraged Automobili Pininfarina to build its second model, the strictly limited B95 hypercar, based on it. The car was presented during the American annual Monterey Car Week event in California in August 2023. The name of the vehicle refers to the Barchetta body, while the number 95 refers to the 95th anniversary of the founding of the original Italian company Pininfarina.

== Specifications and features ==
Visually, the B95 has an aggressive aesthetic, with a barchetta body concept and no side windows, no windshield or door frames. The body was covered with a two-tone, contrasting paint combining light gray and yellow. The vehicle's proportions and stylistic concept refer to classic Italian racing cars. The B95 was constructed using a carbon shell applied to a monocoque made of the same material.

== Performance ==
The B95 accelerates from 0 to 100 km/h in less than 2 seconds, has a top speed of 300 km/h (190 mph), and the 120 kWh (430 MJ) battery allows charging with a power of up to 270 kW (360 hp) and replenishing the charge from 20 to 80% in 25 minutes. The drive system was provided by Rimac Automobili.

== Production ==
Production of the B95 is scheduled to begin in 2025, with a strict limit of 10 units, priced at €4.4 million per unit. Production of the entire planned pool is scheduled for 2025 and is set to be produced in Italy.
