= Automobili Pininfarina =

German car company

Automobili Pininfarina GmbH
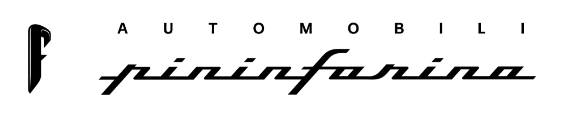
- Type: Subsidiary
- Industry: Automotive
- Founded: Munich, Germany (2018)
- Headquarters: Munich, Germany
- Key people: Paolo Dellachà, CEO; Dave Amantea, Chief Design Officer
- Production output: Automobiles
- Parent: Mahindra Automotive
- Website: automobili-pininfarina.com

Automobili Pininfarina GmbH is a luxury electric vehicle (EV) manufacturer headquartered in Munich, Germany, with roots in the Italian car design firm and coachbuilder Pininfarina SpA. The company also has a design facility and office locations in Turin, Italy. Its first car, the Battista hypercar (named after the founder of Pininfarina SpA, Battista Farina), has been produced from 2022. It was introduced at the Pebble Beach Concours d'Elegance 2018, and 150 units were in production until 2025.

== History ==
On 14 December 2015, Mahindra Group acquired Pininfarina SpA, granting the Mahindra Group rights to its name. On 27 February 2018, Autocar India reported that Michael Perschke, former director at Audi India, will head a new Mahindra & Mahindra Ltd. EV project. This project was later confirmed to be Automobili Pininfarina when Mahindra & Mahindra Ltd. announced the launch of Automobili Pininfarina at the 2018 Rome ePrix, a Formula E electric car race, on 13 April 2018. It was here that Paolo Pininfarina, Chairman of Pininfarina SpA, revealed that "this project [helped] me and my family to realize my grandfather's dream of seeing outstanding innovative cars solely branded Pininfarina on the roads." Chairman and managing director of Mahindra & Mahindra Ltd Anand Mahindra later commented that "Pininfarina is a hell of a story. But it is an unfinished story. Mahindra will help Pininfarina finish that story and dream of having a 'Pininfarina' badged car."

Automobili Pininfarina confirmed the joining of Luca Borgogno from Pininfarina SpA as its Design Director on 18 April 2018. At the same time, it was announced that Automobili Pininfarina will produce the first Pininfarina-branded "ultra-low volume zero-emissions luxury hypercar" from 2020.

On 28 September 2018, Automobili Pininfarina introduced Formula E driver Nick Heidfeld as the Development Driver and brand ambassador. It also announced its technical partnership with Croatian electric car startup Rimac Automobili that will be supplying the EV powertrain and battery technology for the Battista.

On 27 November 2018, Automobili Pininfarina announced that it had invested over €20 million in Pininfarina SpA for its service along with its new "PURA" design philosophy which promises a balance between design and engineering.

At the 2019 Geneva Motor Show the Battista Hypercar was presented to the public for the first time. It has been launched globally throughout the same year.

== Models ==
=== Battista ===
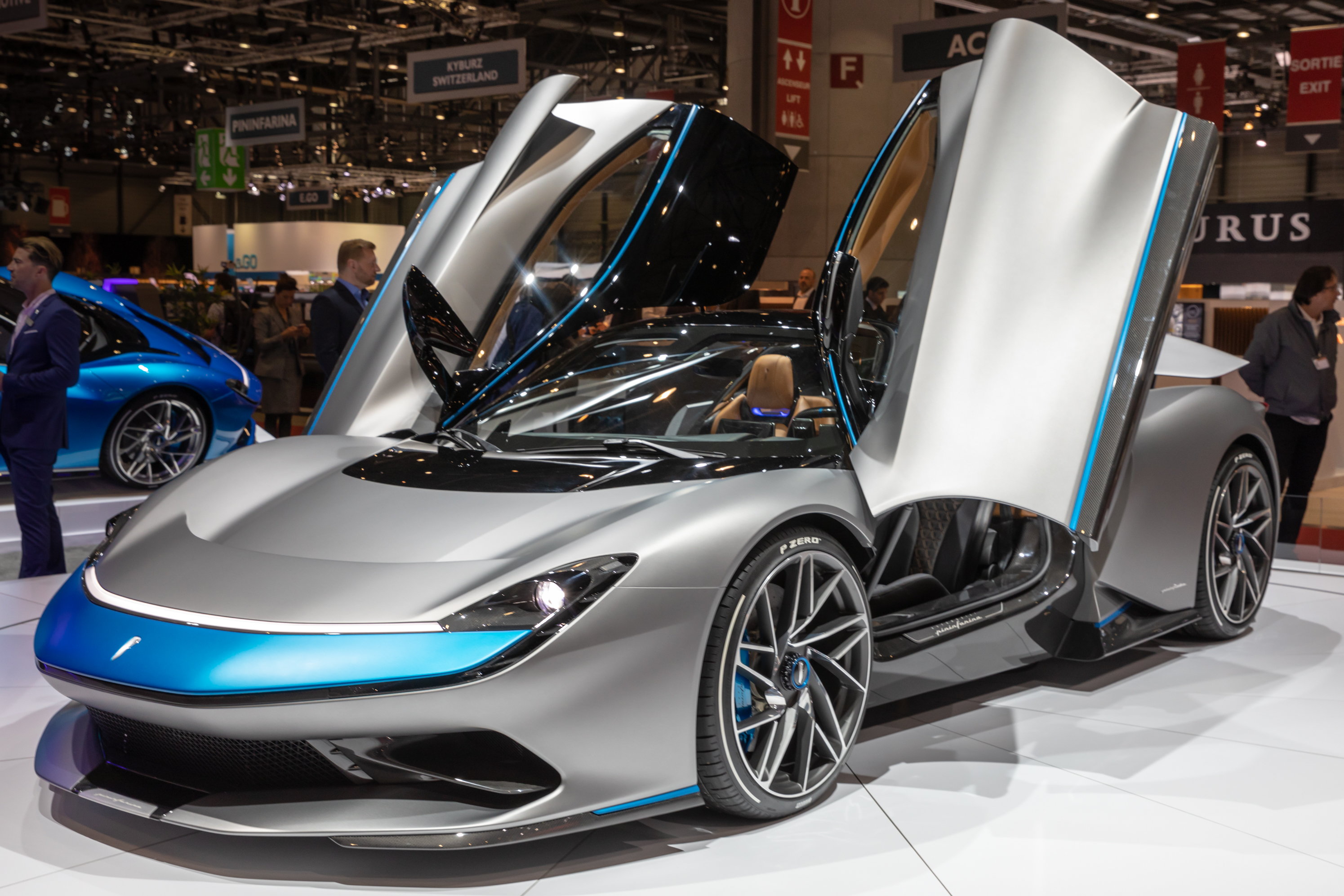
The Battista at the 2019 Geneva Motor Show

Originally announced as the PF0, and the Battista, named after Battista Pininfarina, the founder of the company Pininfarina, is the first Pininfarina-branded high-performance luxury electric hypercar. It is powered by a Rimac Automobili T-shaped 120 kWh battery pack and has four non-synchronous motors placed on each wheel. The car is built on a carbon fibre monocoque chassis and carbon fibre body panels to keep the weight low. Only 150 will be made, with a price of just under €2 million according to the manufacturer. According to Automobili Pininfarina the Battista has a power output of 1,400 kW (1,903 PS; 1,877 hp), has a top speed in excess of 349 km/h (217 mph), can accelerate from 0–100 km/h (0–62 mph) in less than 2 seconds, and 0–300 km/h (0–186 mph) in less than 12 seconds. The range amounts to 500 km on a single charge and the hypercar can be recharged from 20 to 80% state-of-charge in less than 25 minutes.

=== Pura Vision Concept ===
Pura Vision is an all-electric luxury SUV concept debuted at 2023 Monterey Car Week. It featured pillarless front doors and upward-opening rear doors.

=== B95 ===
The B95 is a pure-electric barchetta. First shown at the 2023 Monterey Car Week, it entered production in 2025. The success of the Battista encouraged Pininfarina to create a second model, being the B95.

== See also ==
- Mahindra Group
- Sergio Pininfarina
- Battista Farina
- Andrea Pininfarina

Premium electric vehicle manufacturers:

- Tesla, Inc.
- Rivian
- Faraday Future
- Fisker Inc.
- Karma Automotive
- Lucid Motors
- HiPhi
- Nio
- Byton
- Li Auto
