= Andrea Pininfarina =

Italian engineer and manager

- Born: Andrea Farina; 26 June 1957; Turin
- Died: 7 August 2008 (aged 51); Near Cambiano
- Education: Polytechnic University of Turin
- Occupations: Mechanical engineer, CEO of Pininfarina
- Known for: being CEO of Pininfarina from 2001 to 2008
- Predecessor: Sergio Pininfarina, 1966-2001
- Successor: Paolo Pininfarina, 2008-2024
- Spouse: Cristina Maddalena Pellion di Persano
- Children: Benedetta, Sergio and Luca
- Parents: Sergio Pininfarina; Giorgia Gianolio
- Relatives: Paolo Pininfarina, brother

Andrea Pininfarina (26 June 1957 – 7 August 2008) was an Italian engineer and manager, former CEO of the Italian coachbuilder Pininfarina, founded by his grandfather Battista "Pinin" Farina in 1930 and still controlled by the family. He was the son of Sergio Pininfarina and was married to Italian aristocrat Cristina Maddalena Pellion di Persano, with whom he had three children, Benedetta, Sergio and Luca.

Pininfarina was born in Turin. In 1981, he graduated from the Polytechnic of Turin as a mechanical engineer, and in 1982, he was employed by the Fruehauf Corporation in the United States of America. In 1983, he joined the family business as Program Manager of the Cadillac Allanté project at Pininfarina. In 1987, he was promoted to Co-General Manager of the company, and in 1988, he became General Manager. In 1994, he was again promoted to managing director, and in 2001, he assumed the responsibility of Chief Executive Officer. Pininfarina briefly served as vice president of Italy's Confindustria industry lobby before his death in 2008. In 2004, he was named by Businessweek as one of the "25 Stars of Europe" in the category dedicated to innovators, while in 2005, he received the Eurostar 2005 Award from The Automotive News Europe, awarded to top managers who have particularly distinguished themselves in the business sectors covered by their respective automotive companies.

Pininfarina died while riding a Vespa near the company's headquarters in Cambiano outside Turin, on the morning of 7 August 2008. According to the police, a car driven by a 78-year-old man maneuvered from a side street around a parked lorry and pulled directly in front of Pininfarina. Conditions at the time of the accident were very foggy.
