= Alfa Romeo Spider =

- Alfa Romeo Spider Series 2 ("Coda Tronca")

Overview
- Manufacturer: Alfa Romeo (1966–1986); Alfa Lancia Industriale (1987–1991); Fiat Auto (1991–1993)
- Also called: Alfa Romeo "Duetto"
- Production: 1966–1993
- Model years: 1966–1994
- Assembly: Italy: Grugliasco, Turin; Italy: San Giorgio Canavese (Pininfarina)
- Designer: Aldo Brovarone and Battista Pininfarina at Pininfarina

Body and chassis
- Class: Sports car
- Body style: 2-door roadster
- Layout: Front-engine, rear-wheel-drive
- Related: Alfa Romeo Giulia; Alfa Romeo 105/115 Series Coupés

Chronology
- Predecessor: Alfa Romeo Giulietta Spider
- Successor: Alfa Romeo Spider (916)

The Alfa Romeo Spider (105/115 series) is a two-seater, front-engined, rear-drive roadster manufactured and marketed by Alfa Romeo from 1966 to 1994 in four distinct generations, or "series", each with modifications ranging from modest to extensive.

As successor to the Giulia Spider, the Spider remained in production for almost three decades. The first three series were assembled by Pininfarina in Grugliasco and the fourth series in San Giorgio Canavese. The last Spider of that series was manufactured in April 1993—the last rear-wheel drive Alfa Romeo before the Alfa Romeo 8C Competizione of 2007.

In 2012, FCA Italy and Mazda studied the possibility of jointly developing a new Spider for 2015 based on the Mazda MX-5 platform. Ultimately, FCA and Mazda chose to manufacture a modern interpretation of the Fiat 124 Sport Spider rather than reviving the Alfa Romeo Spider.

== History ==
=== Development ===
In 1962, Alfa Romeo introduced the new 105 Series Giulia, which first complemented and then replaced the 101-series Giulietta. The sport variants of the Giulietta remained on sale for several more years, upgraded to the Giulia's 1.6-litre engine and rebadged Giulia, until analogous variants of the new models were ready.

Thus, the Giulietta-based Giulia Spider 1600 and Giulia Spider Veloce were produced from 1962 to 1965 and from 1963 to 1965, respectively. The Alfa Romeo Spider was based on Giulia mechanicals, including its Alfa Romeo twin cam inline-four, independent front and solid axle rear suspension, and unibody construction, incorporating the relatively new principles of crumple zones into the front and rear. Following the evolution the other Giulia sport variants, the Spider was powered by a 1.6 L engine, later received a 1750 cc, then a 1300 cc, and finally a 2000 cc engine. Unlike any other Giulia derivative, it was upgraded and continued to sell through four decades, into the 1990s.

As for its predecessor the Giulietta Spider, the Italian firm of Pininfarina was responsible for the design, manufacturing of the body, and final assembly. The 1600 Spider was the last project in which founder Battista Pininfarina was involved. Design director of Pininfarina at that time was Franco Martinengo.

==== Giulia GT Spider ====
The 1963 Giulia GT Spider was intended as a replacement for the Pininfarina-designed Giulia Spider. Centro Stile Alfa Romeo and Bertone presented a proposition for a two-seater sports car that was developed between 1962 and 1963. Chassis type 105.03 was the same as the future "Duetto" Spider. The car was designed by Ernesto Cattoni and realised by Bertone. The overall style was very similar to the Giugiaro-designed, coupé version of Giulia, but on a shorter chassis. The car never went into production and remained a prototype, bearing serial number 002.

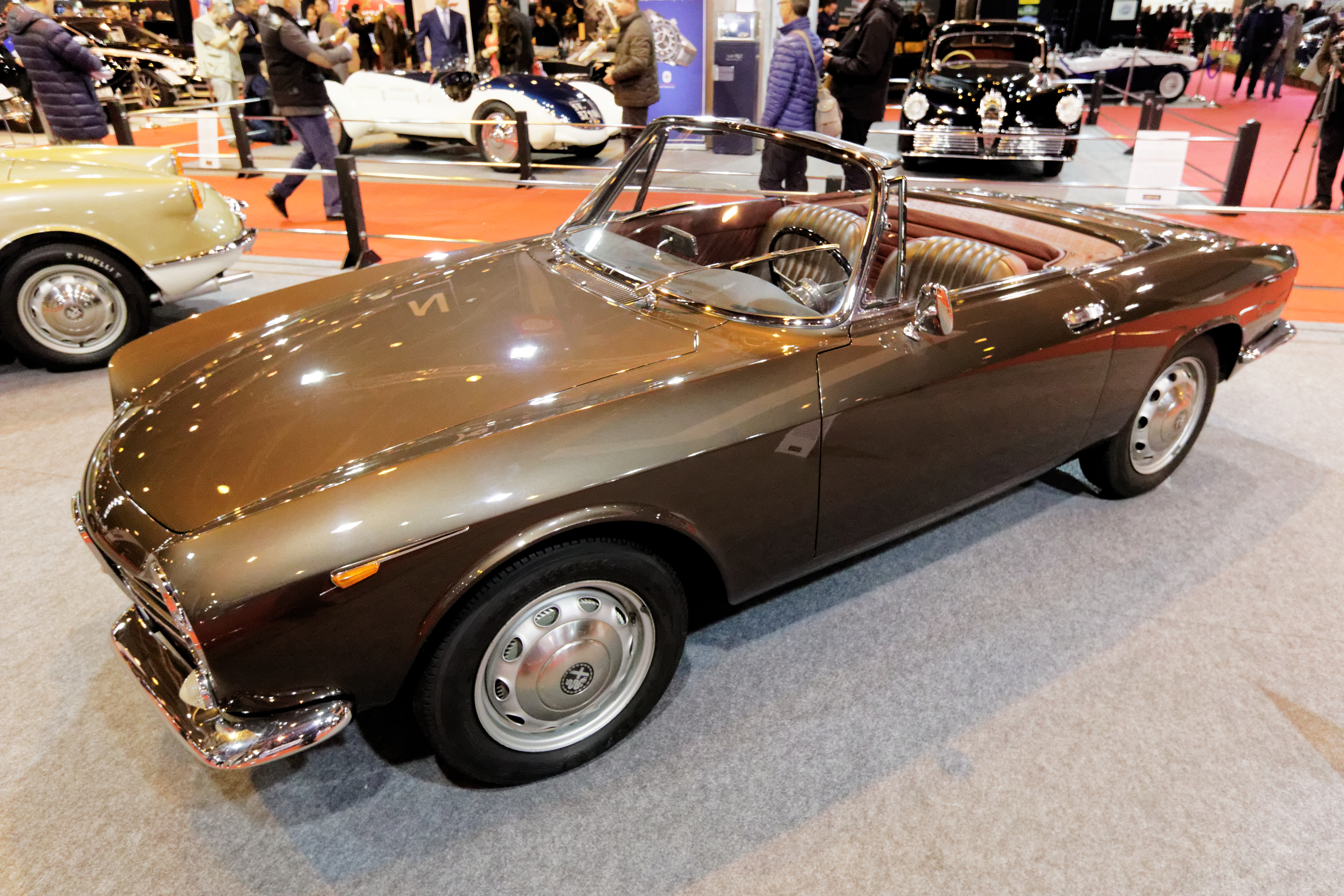
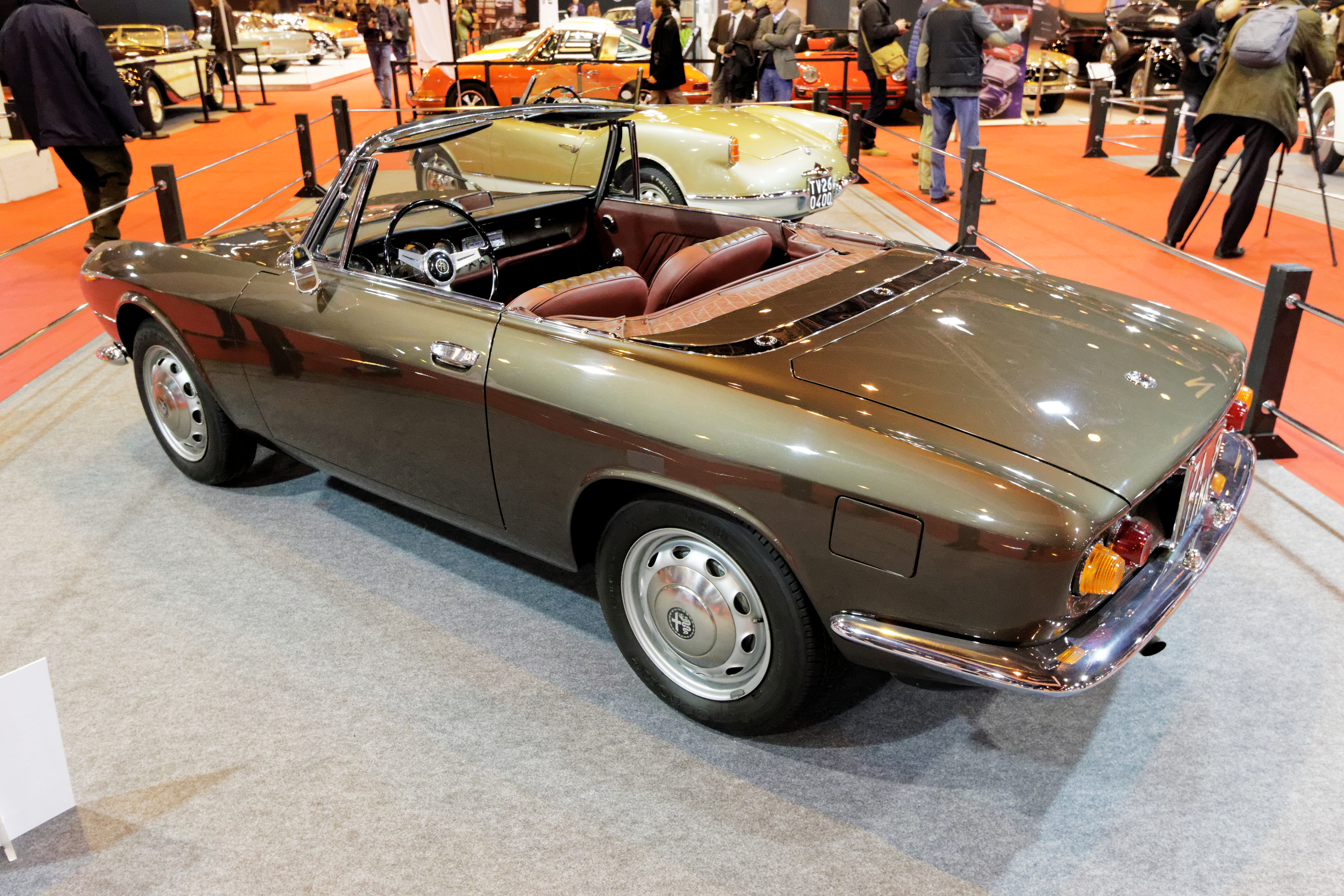
1963 Giulia GT Spider prototipo

=== Design ===
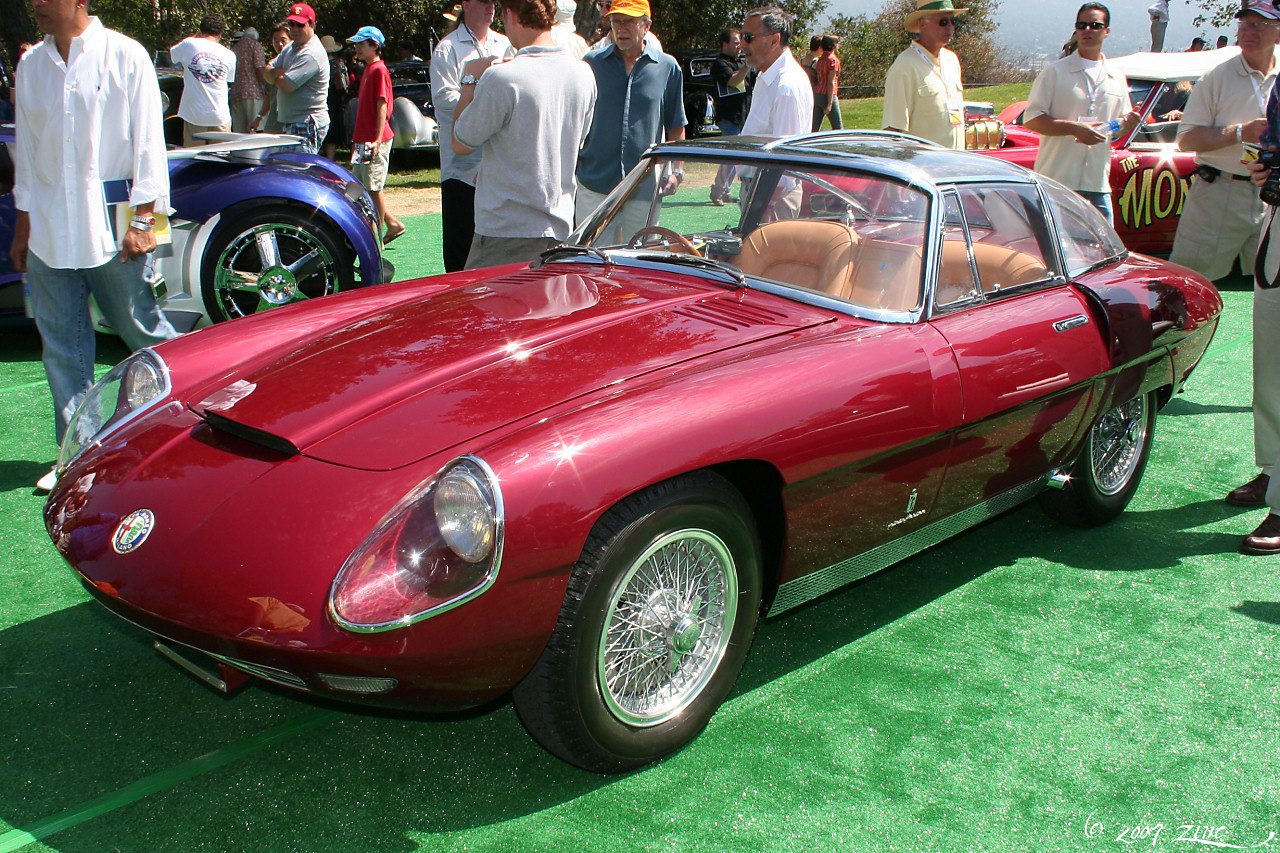
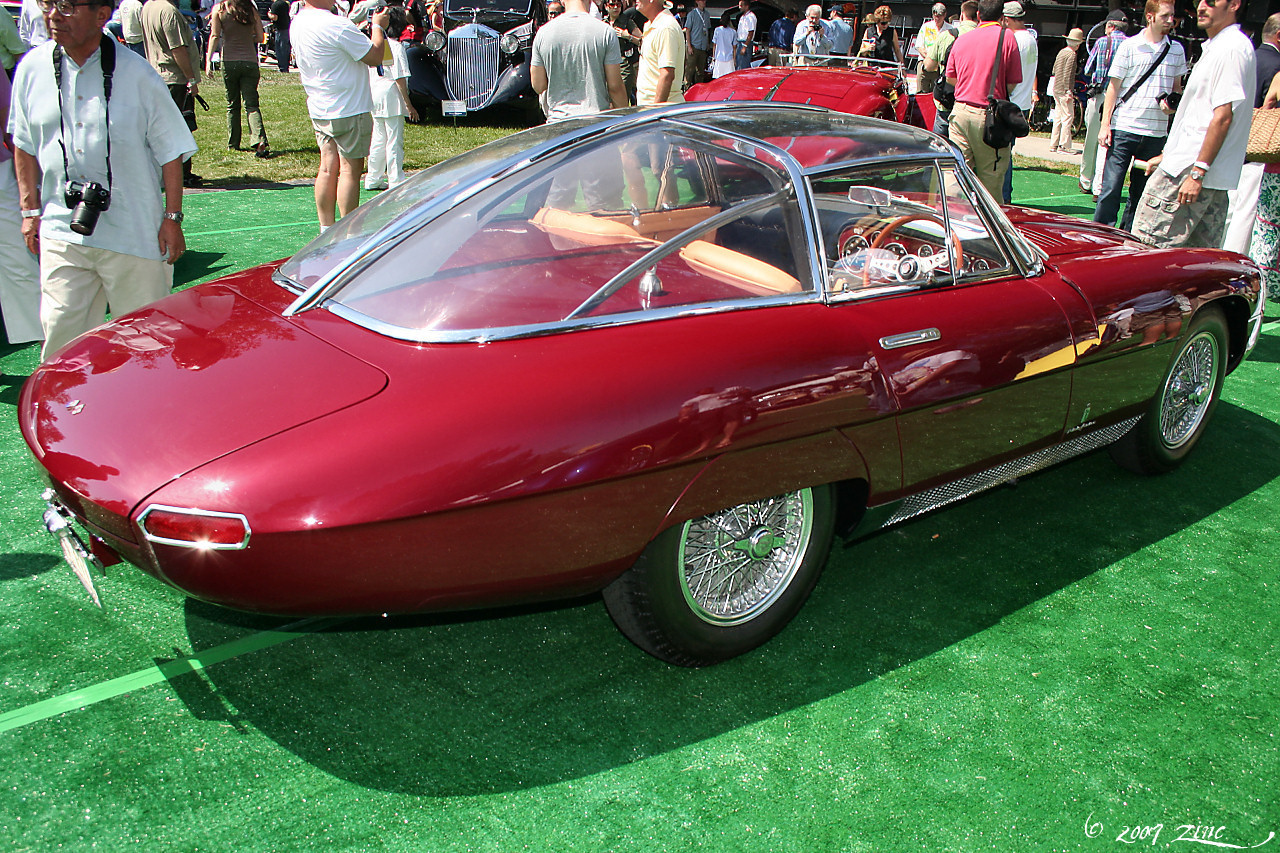
Front and rear views of the 1956 Alfa Romeo S3000 CM Superflow, which inspired the Spider

The original 1966 Spider shape was the result of a number of Pininfarina design studies, concept cars showing traits incorporated in the final production design. The first one was the Alfa Romeo Superflow, a concept car built on the chassis of a retired 6C 3000 CM racing car and first shown at the 1956 Turin Motor Show, designed by Aldo Brovarone. Despite being an aerodynamic coupé with prominent fins on the rear, and a futuristic all-plexiglas greenhouse and front wings, the Superflow already showed the overall body shape of the future Spider and the scallops on the sides.

In the following years the Superflow was updated three times into three more different concept cars, namely a Superflow II coupé, then an open-top spider and finally another Superflow IV coupé. The most significant in the Spider's design history was the second, the open-top Alfa Romeo Spider Super Sport, shown at the 1959 Geneva Motor Show. It did without the rear fins of the Superflow and Superflow II, showing for the first time the rounded cuttlebone-shaped tail and tail light configuration of the Spider. Last of the Spider's forerunner was the Giulietta Sprint Speciale-based Alfa Romeo Giulietta SS Spider Aerodinamica, which premiered at the 1961 Turin Motor Show. It was similar in shape to the production car, but for hideaway headlamps.

Despite the almost final design being ready in 1961, the continuing success of existing models and the economic challenges facing Italy at the time meant that the first pre-launch production Spiders began to emerge from the Pininfarina production line only at the end of 1965.

=== Series 1 (1966–1969) ===
First generation
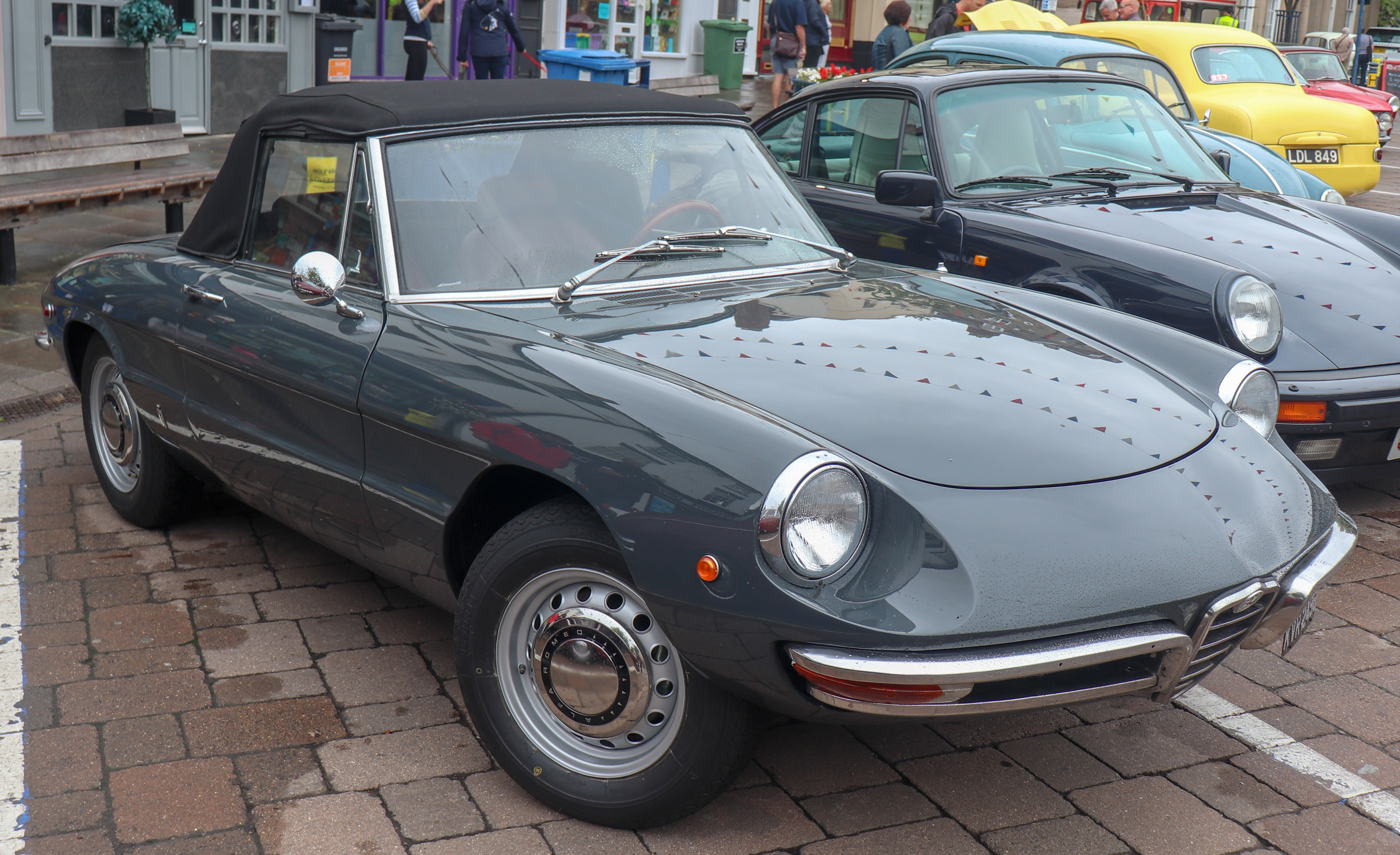
- 1969 Alfa Romeo 1750 Spider Veloce

Overview
- Production: 1966–1969

Powertrain
- Engine: 1290 cc Twin Cam I4; 1570 cc Twin Cam I4; 1779 cc Twin Cam I4
- Transmission: 5-speed manual

Dimensions
- Wheelbase: 2,250 mm (88.6 in)
- Length: 4,250 mm (167.3 in)
- Width: 1,630 mm (64.2 in)
- Height: 1,290 mm (50.8 in)
- Kerb weight: 990–1,040 kg (2,183–2,293 lb)

The Spider was launched at the 36th Geneva Motor Show in March 1966, and together with the Giulia Sprint GT Veloce tested by the press at an event organised in Gardone Riviera. To choose a name for the new Spider, Alfa Romeo announced a write-in competition, offering an example of the new car as a prize. Over 100,000 ballots were sent in, the great majority from Italy; the winner was Guidobaldo Trionfi from Brescia, who proposed the name "Duetto" (duet). However, the winning name could not be officially adopted due to trademark issues: in 1965, confectionery manufacturer Pavesi had launched a chocolate snack called 'Duetto'. The Court of Milan ruled that Pavesi, having already registered the name, had exclusive rights to it, thus the car was named simply Alfa Romeo Spider 1600.

The Spider's 1,570 cc twin cam engine had dual Weber two-barrel side-draft carburetors, and produced 109 PS DIN (80 kW; 108 hp) (or 129 PS SAE). Sparsely fitted inside but including five speed manual transmission, disc brakes, and 15-inch wheels with 155HR15 Pirelli Cinturato CA67 tyres. The price on launch in Italy was 2,195,000 lire. In the US the car sold for $3,950 (compared to $3,991 for a Lotus Elan and $2,607 for an MGB). In the UK the car's price was close to a Jaguar E-Type.

In January 1968, in Vietri sul Mare (Salerno), Alfa Romeo introduced the press to its 1750 line of cars, which included the new 1750 Berlina saloon, the Giulia Sprint-based 1750 GT Veloce coupé, and the 1600 Spider-based 1750 Spider Veloce, which replaced the original Spider 1600. All were powered by the same engine, a new 1,779 cc, 118 PS DIN (87 kW; 116 hp; or 132 PS SAE) version of the Alfa Romeo twin cam engine. Top speed rose to 190 km/h (118 mph). The car did not bear any Spider badging, just a "1750" script below the rear Alfa Romeo badge. During the production run, the front repeater lights were moved ahead of the wheel arches.

While in Europe, the 1750 was fitted with two twin horizontal carburettors, starting with model year 1969 models for the North American market had SPICA (Società Pompe Iniezione Cassani & Affini, a subsidiary of Alfa Romeo) mechanical fuel injection. According to Alfa Romeo engine output and performance were unchanged from the carburetted version. Modifications were also made to the suspension, brakes, electrics, and 14" wheels, though the car looked effectively the same. Visible differences were limited to the rear-view mirror repositioned to the door, and badging on the tail, which read "Alfa Romeo" and "iniezione" (injection).

A new lower priced spider, the Spider 1300 Junior, was introduced in June 1968 alongside the GTA 1300 Junior competition coupé. Its 1,290 cc twin cam engine was the same used on the GT 1300 Junior coupé, and produced 89 PS DIN (65 kW; 88 hp); or 103 PS SAE. Top speed was 170 km/h (106 mph). From a mechanical standpoint the Junior differed from the 1750 only in engine displacement and output, while inside it lacked some features of the pricier model: namely opening quarter lights, centre console, and the three-spoke wood rimmed steering wheel, replaced by a two-spoke plastic rimmed one. From outside, the Junior version could be recognised by its black-coloured lower front bumper and absence of plastic headlamp fairings.

Due to the shape of its long, round tail, the Series 1 Spider is sometimes known as the "Osso di seppia" (Italian for cuttlebone) or "boat tail" to differentiate it from the "Kamm tail" Series 2. In North America the Series 1 is sometimes called the dovetail spider or Duetto.

6,324 1600 Spiders were made and 2,680 1300 Juniors.

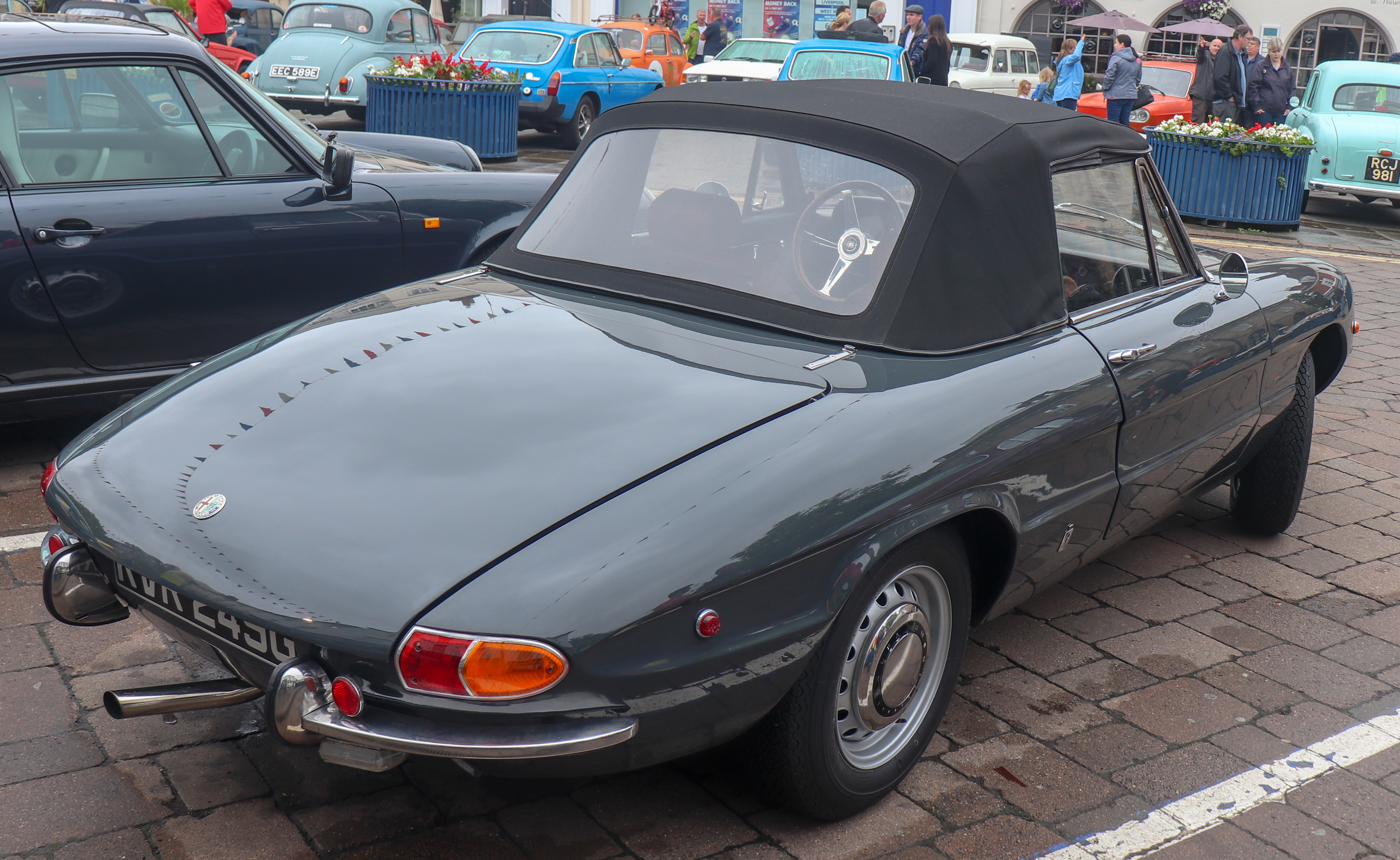
Rear

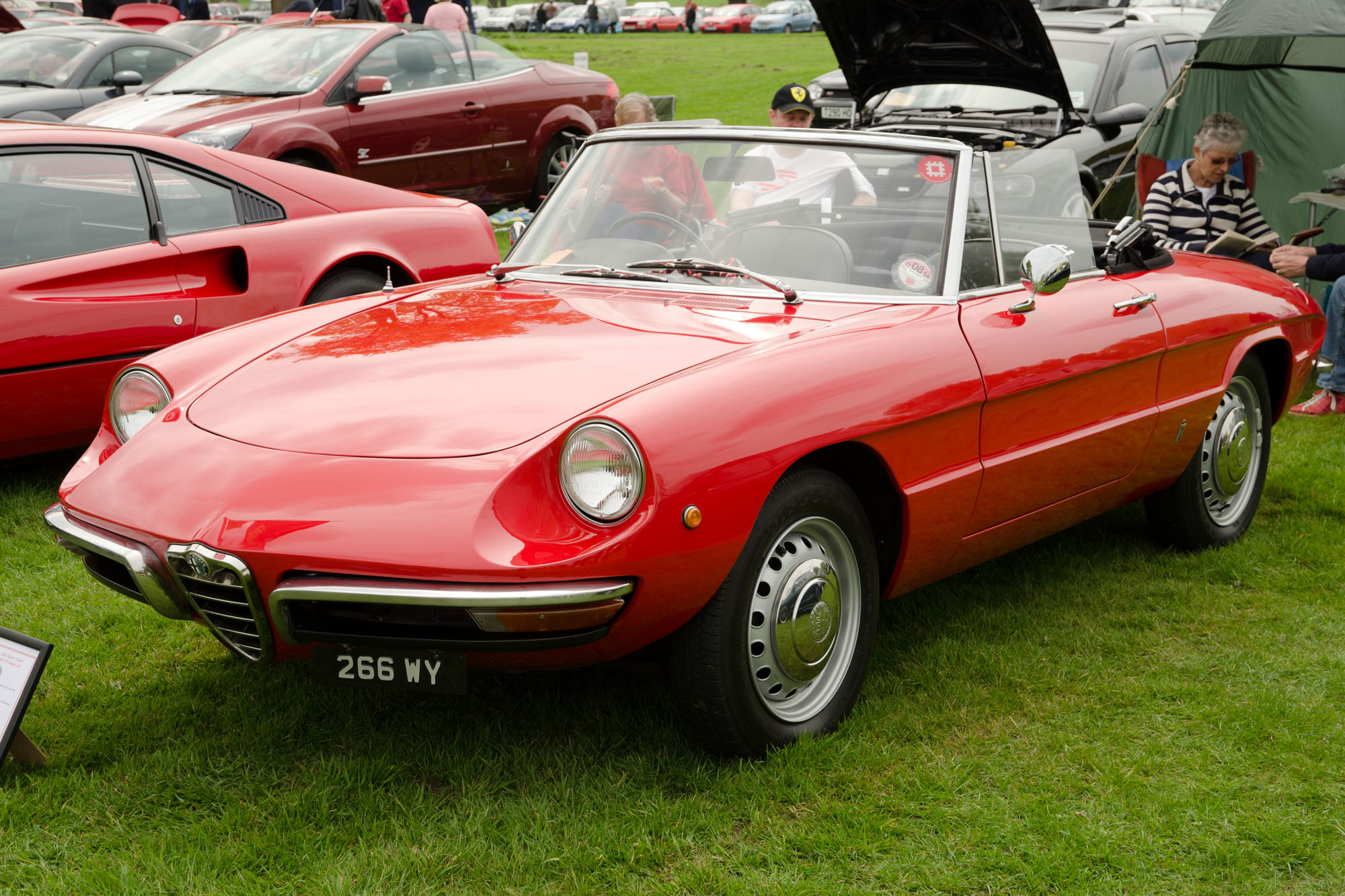
Alfa Romeo Spider Junior 1300

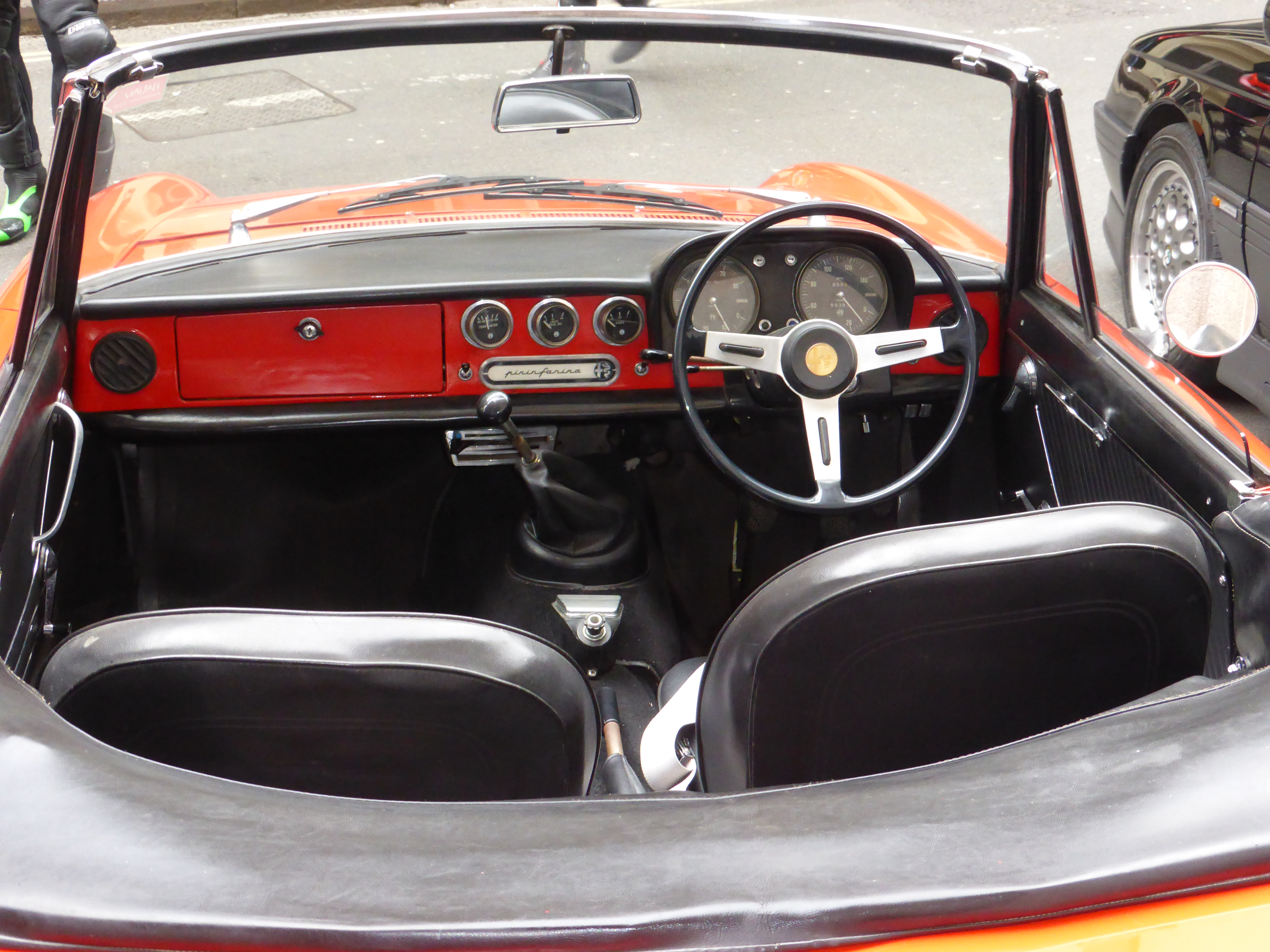
Interior

=== Series 2 (1970–1982/83) ===
Second generation
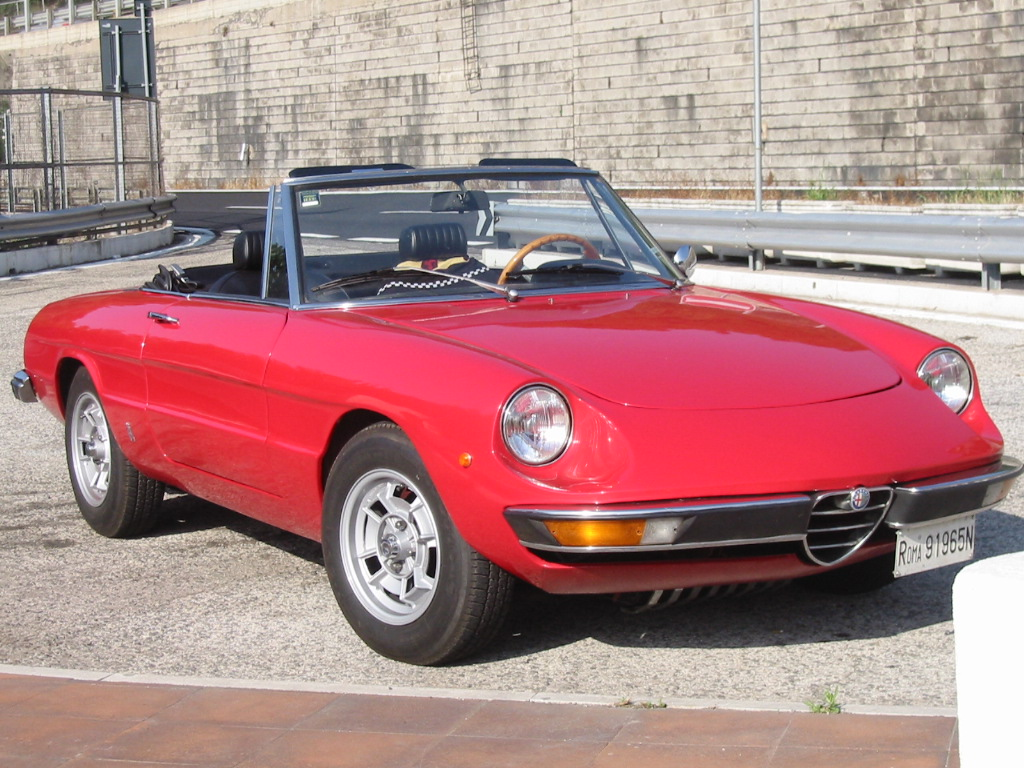
- Spider Junior 1.6 (1974) "Coda Tronca"

Overview
- Production: 1970–1982

Powertrain
- Engine: 1.3 L Twin Cam I4; 1.6 L Twin Cam I4; 1.8 L Twin Cam I4; 2.0 L Twin Cam I4
- Transmission: 5-speed manual

Dimensions
- Wheelbase: 2,250 mm (88.6 in)
- Length: 4,120 mm (162.2 in)
- Width: 1,630 mm (64.2 in)
- Height: 1,290 mm (50.8 in)
- Kerb weight: 1,025 kg (2,260 lb)

In 1970 the first significant change to the exterior styling was introduced on the 1750 Spider Veloce, with the original's distinctive elongated round tail revised to a Kamm tail, improving luggage space. Numerous other small changes took place both inside and out, such as a slightly different grille, new door handles, a more raked windscreen, top-hinged pedals and improved interior trim.

1971 saw the Spider Veloce receive a new, larger powerplant—a 1962 cc, 132 hp (98 kW) unit—and consequently the name was changed from 1750 Spider Veloce to 2000 Spider Veloce. The 1600 Spider restarted production a year later as the Spider 1600 Junior, and was visually identical to the 1300.

1974 saw the introduction of the rare, factory request, Spider-Targa. Based on the Spider, it featured a Porsche style solid rear window and black lift out GRP roof panels. Fewer than 2,000 examples were manufactured and this was the only Spider with a partly-solid roof Spider. The factory later introduced a model-specific hard top.

The 1300 and 2000 cars were modified in 1974 and 1975 respectively to include two small seats behind the front seats, becoming a "two plus two" four seater. The 1300 model was discontinued in 1977. Also, between 1974 and 1976, the early-style stainless-steel bumpers were discontinued and replaced with black, rubber-clad units to meet increasingly stringent North American crash requirements. The fuel injected (SPICA) 2-liter version for the US market received the tipo 115.41 model code.

4,557 of the 1300 Junior were made and 4,848 of the 1600 Junior. 16,320 Spider Veloce 2000 were made and 22,059 of the Spider Veloce 2000 Iniezione (US version). Of the 1750 Spider Veloce, 4,027 were made.

==== 1978 Niki Lauda Special Edition ====
In 1978 former F1 champion Niki Lauda joined the Brabham Alfa Romeo F1 team and to celebrate this new addition to Alfa's race team it was decided that Niki Lauda was to be honoured by a special edition Spider in his name. The "Niki Lauda" special edition was launched at the 1978 Long Beach Grand Prix and chassis #001 was driven on the circuit by Niki himself. All together 350 examples of the Lauda edition were made. The car had only cosmetic trim changes, including badging and the addition of a rear spoiler.

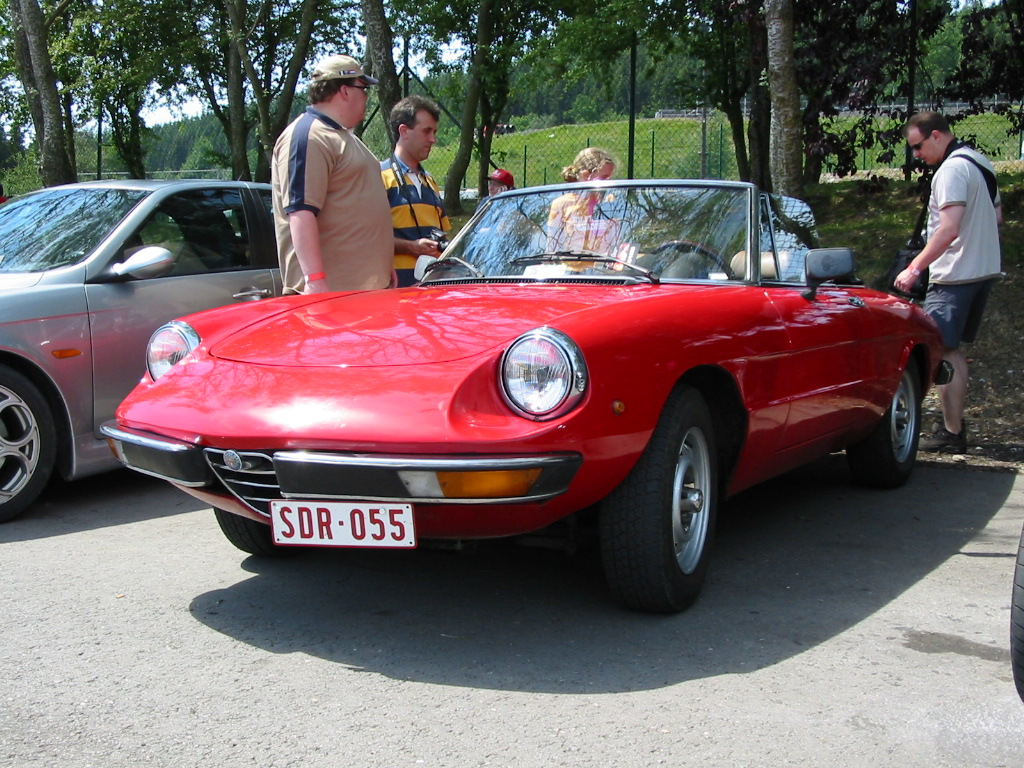
Series 2 Spider 2000 Veloce

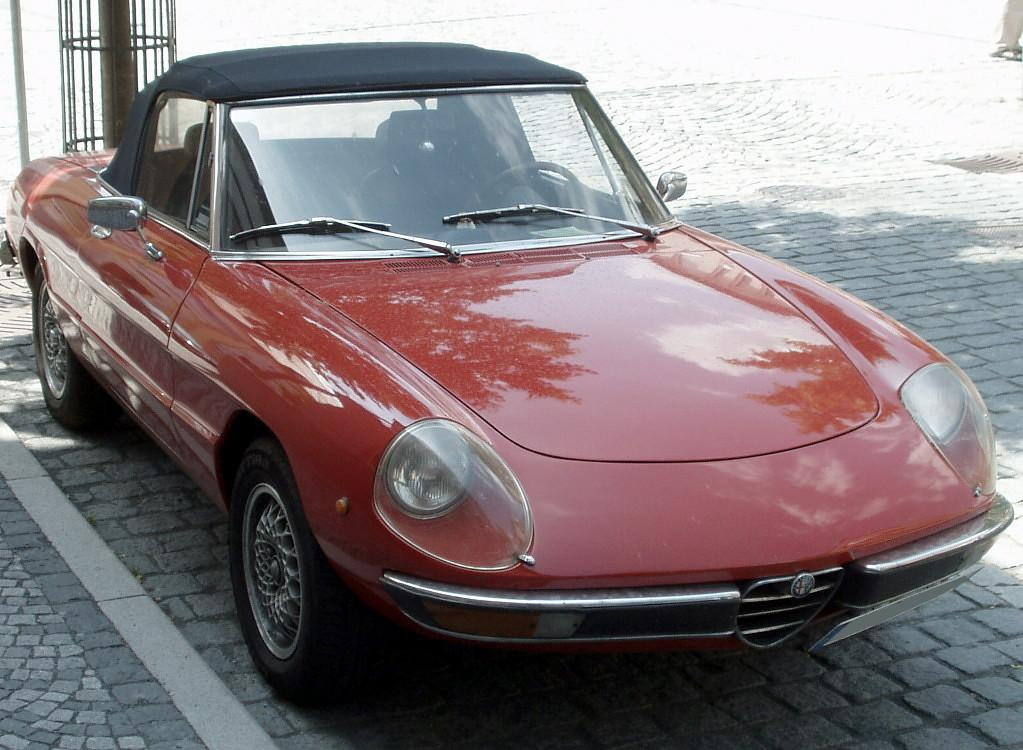
Spider Coda Tronca

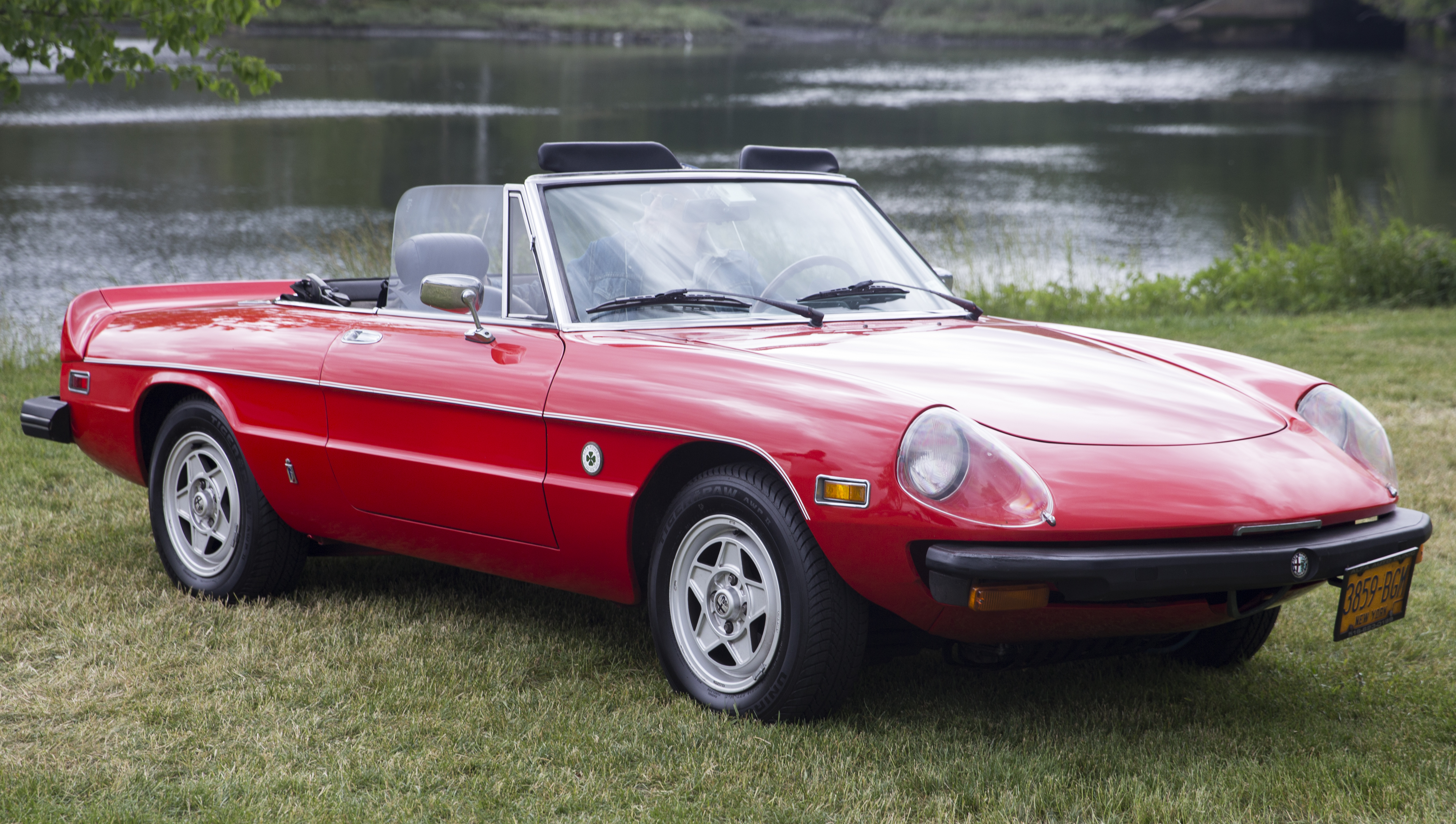
1978 Alfa Romeo Spider Niki Lauda Special Edition, front view. The federal bumper required that the Alfa escutcheon be lopped off in the middle.

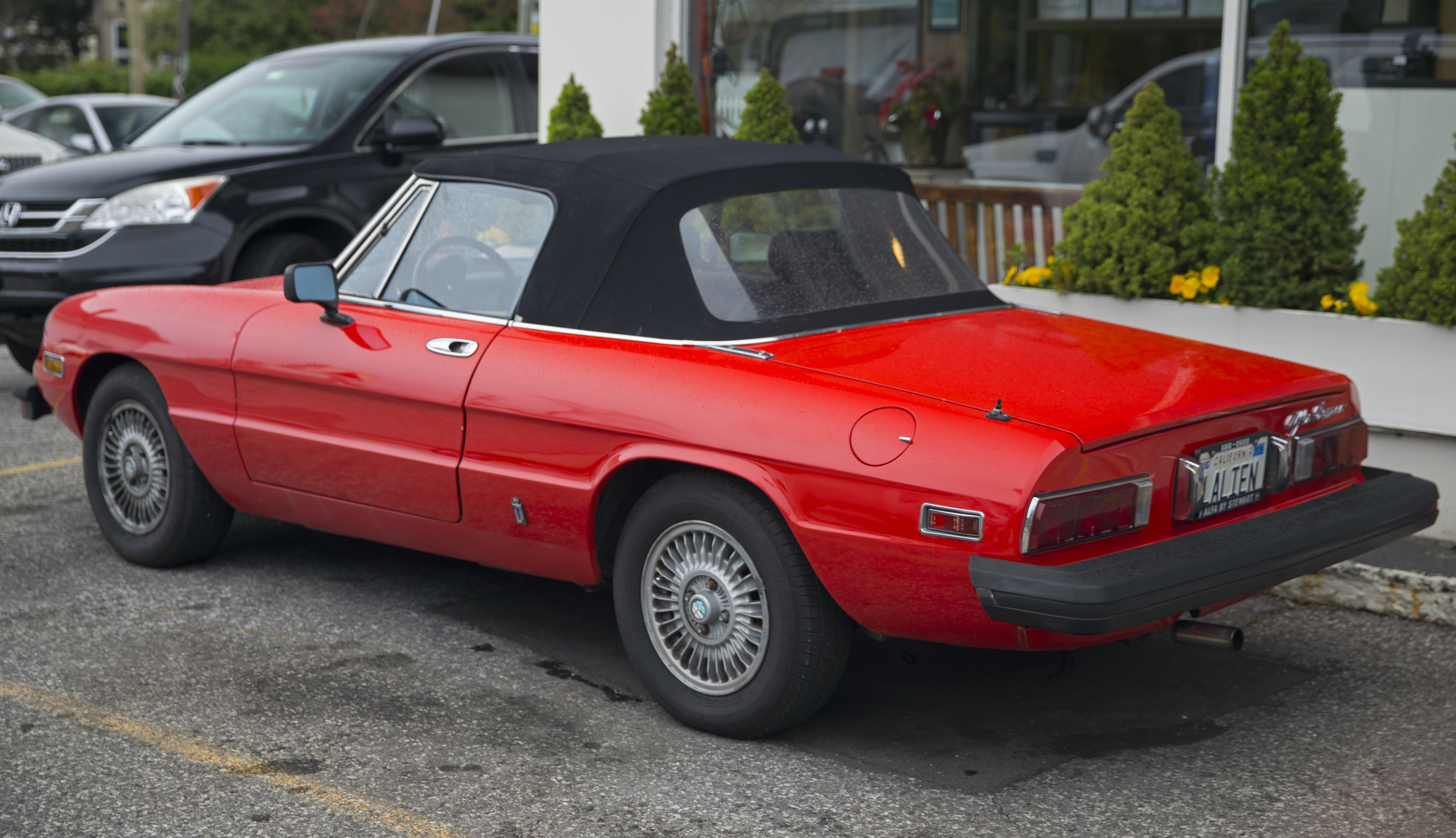
Rear view of a US-market 1979 Coda Tronca, showing the large bumpers of the 115.41 model.

=== Series 3 (1982/83–1989/90) ===
Third generation
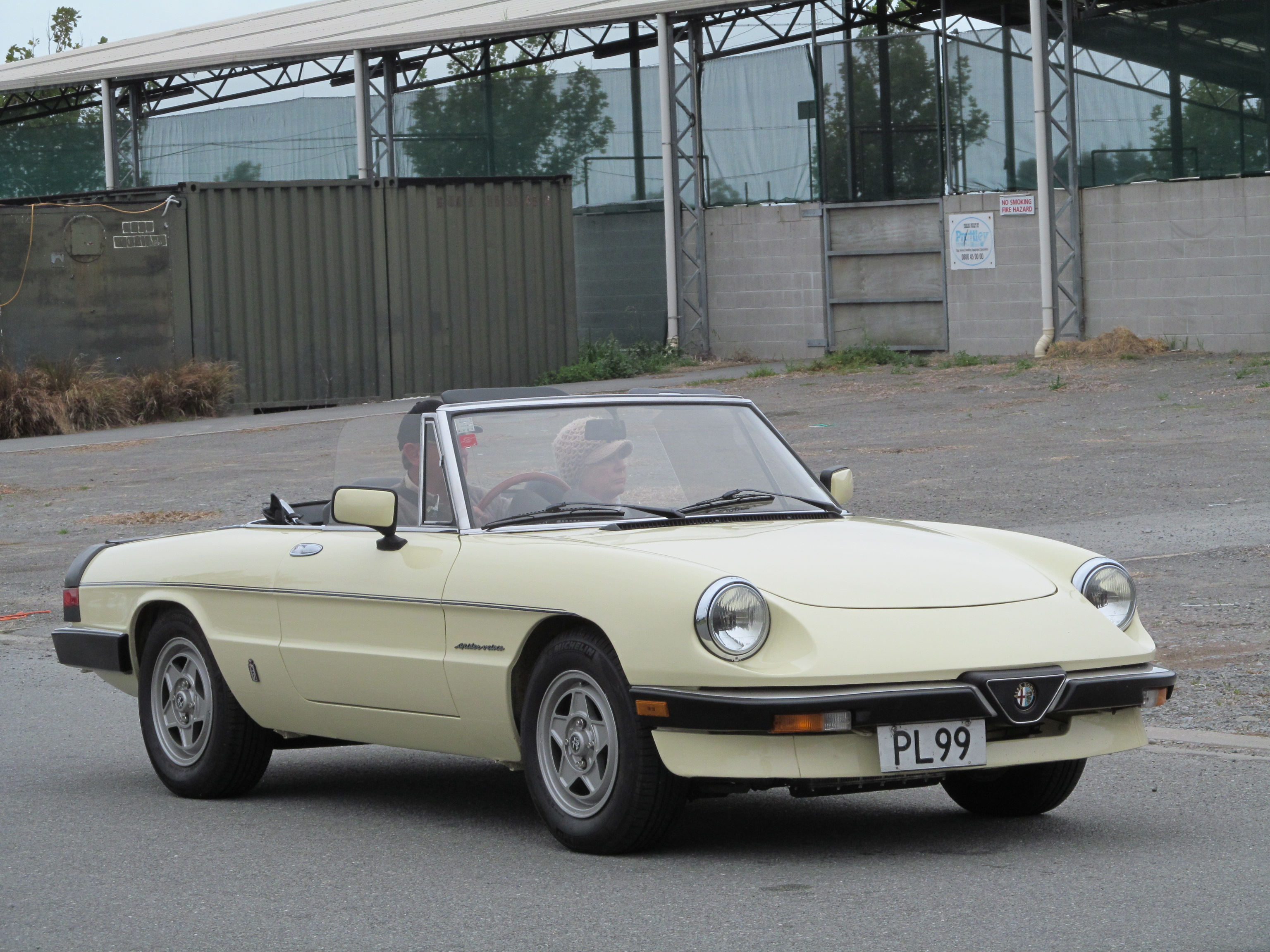
- Series 3 Spider "Aerodinamica"

Overview
- Production: 1983–1989

Powertrain
- Engine: 1.6 L Twin Cam I4; 2.0 L Twin Cam I4
- Transmission: 5-speed manual

Dimensions
- Wheelbase: 2,250 mm (88.6 in)
- Length: 4,267 mm (168.0 in)
- Width: 1,630 mm (64.2 in)
- Height: 1,290 mm (50.8 in)
- Kerb weight: 1,040 kg (2,293 lb)

The Series 3 Spider debuted in North America for the 1982 model year with the introduction of 2.0 litre Bosch electronic fuel injection to replace the SPICA mechanical fuel injection.

The Spider received a further styling revision in 1983, with introduction of black rubber front and rear bumpers, a front bumper incorporating the grille, a small soft rubber spoiler added to the rear kammback, and various other minor mechanical and aesthetic modifications. The 1600 car (never available in North America) dropped the "Junior" name.

The Quadrifoglio Verde (Green Fourleaf Clover) model was introduced in 1986, with many aesthetic tweaks, including sideskirts, mirrors, new front and rear spoilers, hard rubber trunk mounted spoilers with integral third stoplight, unique 15" alloys and optional removable hardtop. Different interior trim included blood red carpets and gray leather seats with red stitching. The QV was offered in only three colours: red, silver and black. It was otherwise mechanically identical to the standard Spider Veloce model, with a 2.0 L (1,962 cc) DOHC 2 valves per cylinder four-cylinder engine, fuel fed by twin two-barrel 40DCOM4/5 Weber carburetors in Europe producing 128 PS (126 bhp; 94 kW) at 5400 rpm and 178 N⋅m (131 lbf⋅ft) at 4000 rpm of torque; while in North American models retained the Bosch L-Jetronic fuel injection introduced for the 1982 model year except that the VVT mechanism was now L-Jet activated and five-speed manual transmission.

The interior received a new center console, lower dash panels (to meet U.S. regulations) and a single monopod gauge cluster (with electronic gauges). For the North American market a model marketed as the Graduate acknowledged the model's appearance in the 1967 film, The Graduate, starring Dustin Hoffman.

The Graduate was intended as a less expensive entry-level model with the same engine and transmission as the Quadrifoglio and Veloce, but with steel wheels, manual windows, vinyl seats, and vinyl top. Air conditioning and a dealer-installed radio were the only options. The Graduate arrived in 1985 in North America and continued until 1990.

Only minor changes occurred from 1986 to 1989, including new paint colors, the addition of a center high mount stop lamp (CHMSL) midway through 1986 for North American models, a move away from the brown carpet, and new turn signal levers.

To comply with federal passive safety standards, a subset of Model Year 1988 examples featured automatic seatbelts with the shoulder belts' inertia reel retractors mounted behind and between the front seats, and routed through guides mounted on the inboard shoulder of the upper seat backs.

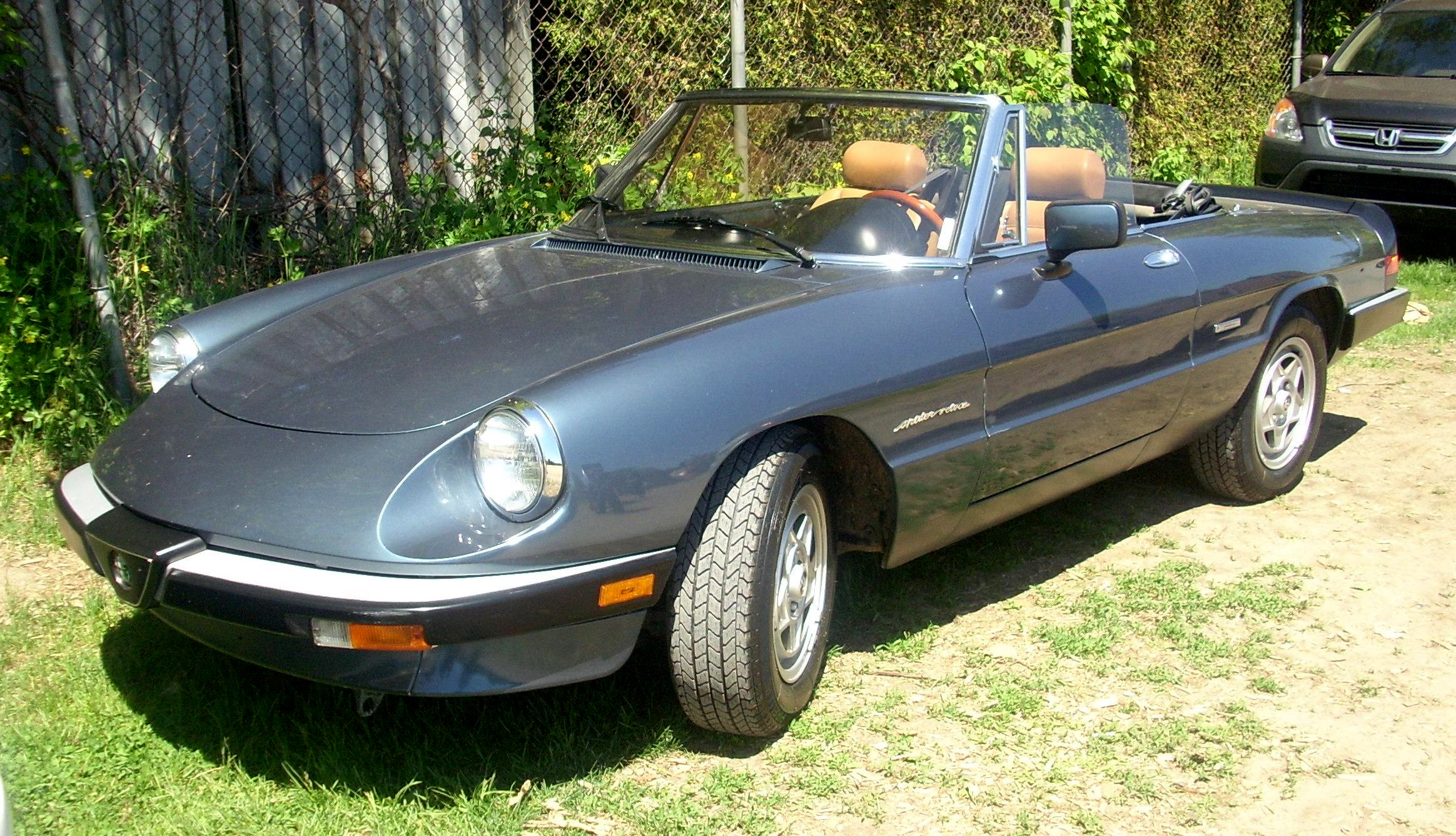
Spider Veloce (North America)

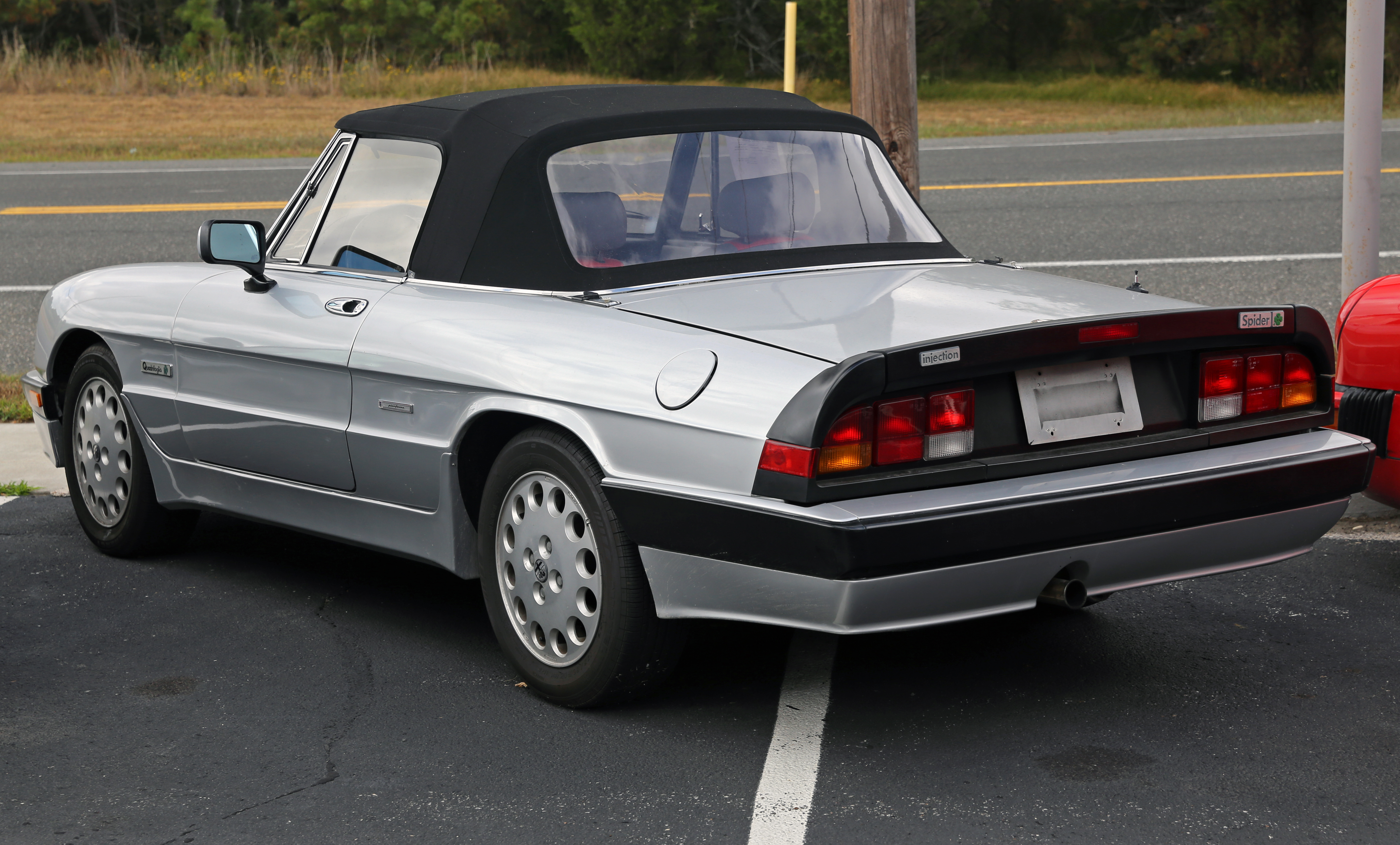
3rd series Spider Quadrifoglio Verde, rear view

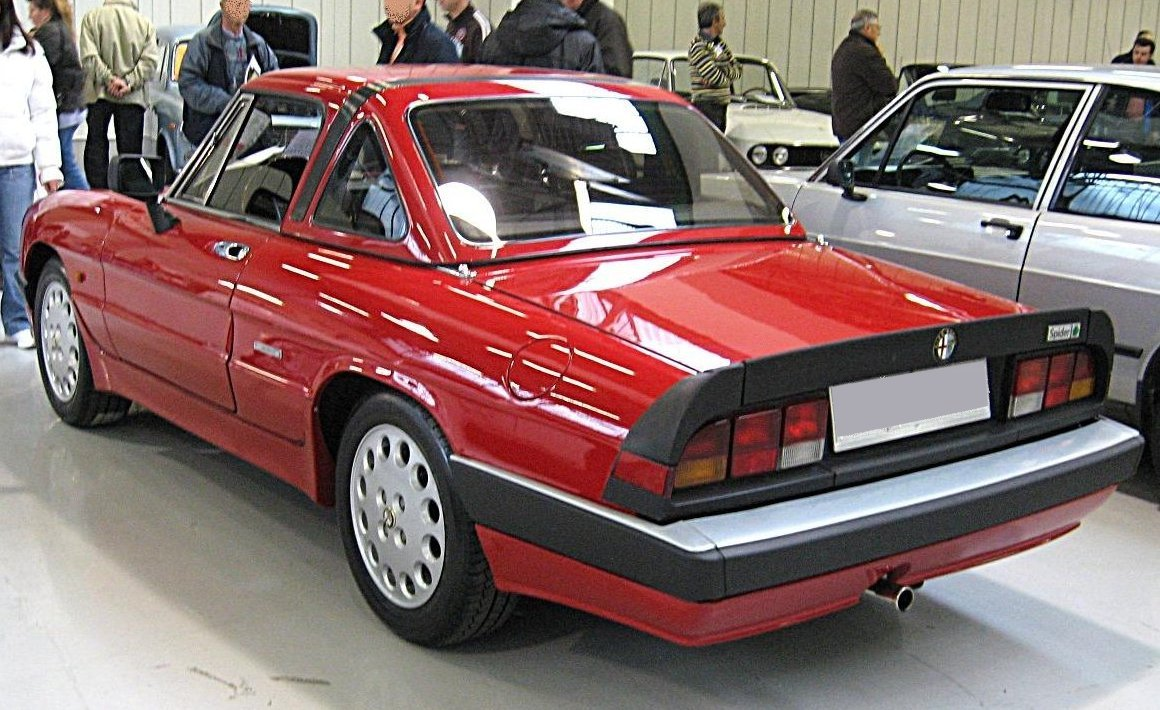
Spider 3rd series Quadrifoglio Verde version with optional hard top

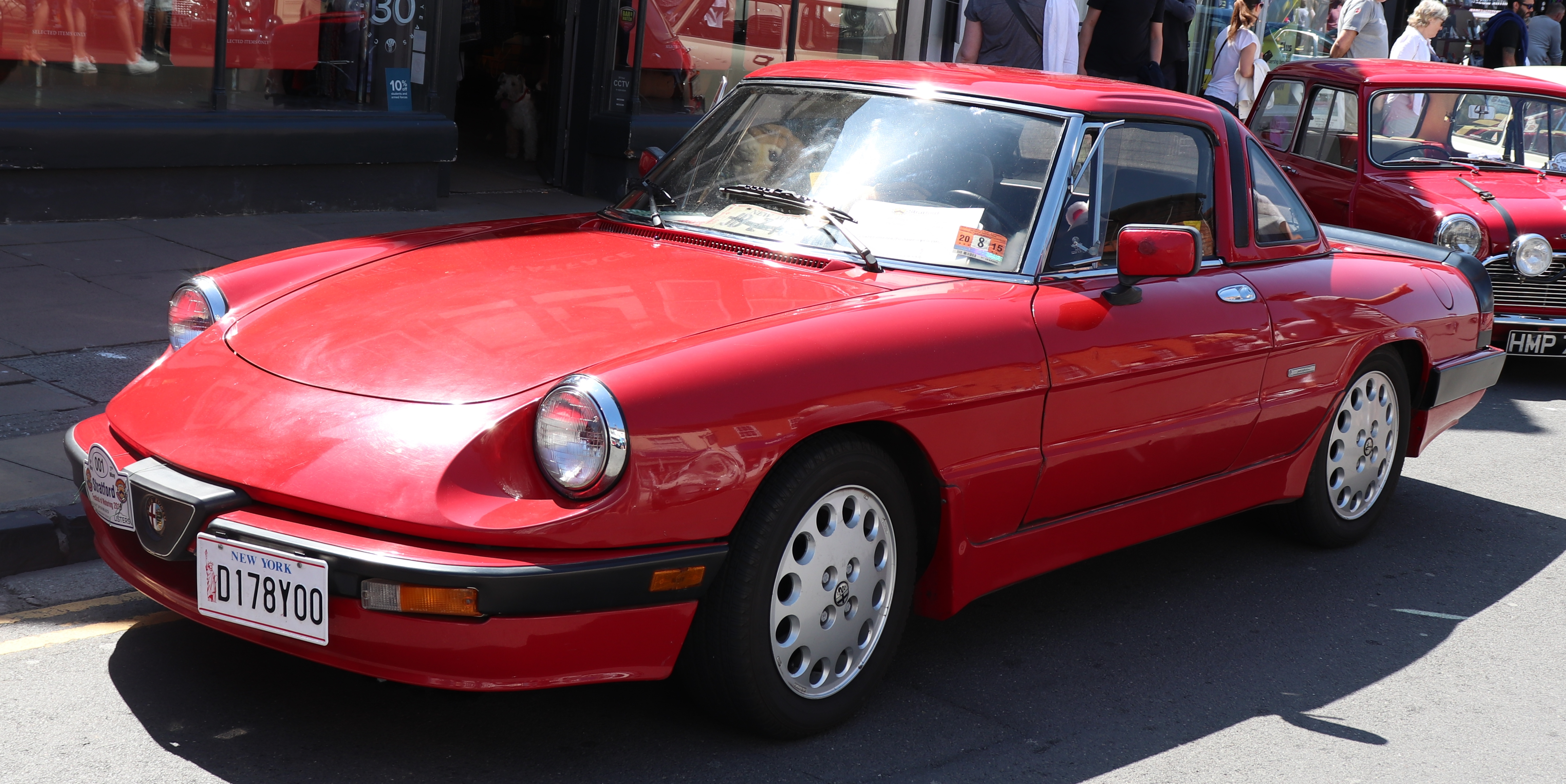
1987 Spider Quadrifoglio Verde 2.0 hardtop front view

=== Series 4 (1990/91–1993) ===
Fourth generation
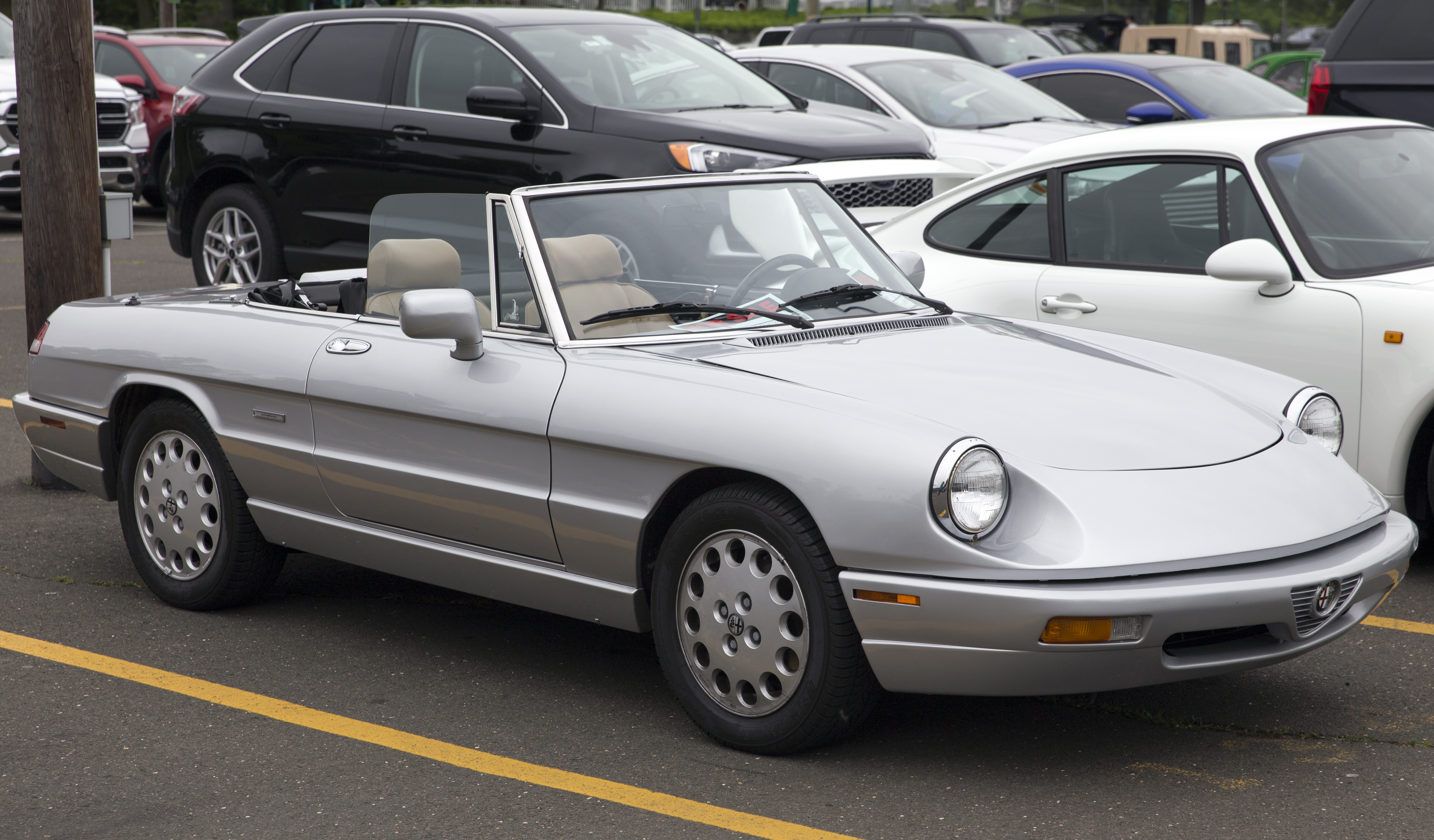

Overview
- Production: 1990–1993

Powertrain
- Engine: 1.6 L Twin Cam I4; 2.0 L Twin Cam I4
- Transmission: 5-speed manual 3-speed automatic

Dimensions
- Wheelbase: 2,250 mm (88.6 in)
- Length: 4,257 mm (167.6 in)
- Width: 1,630 mm (64.2 in)
- Height: 1,262 mm (49.7 in)
- Kerb weight: 1,110 kg (2,447 lb)

Series 4 launched in 1990, with Bosch Motronic electronic fuel injection, full-width body-colored plastic bumper fascias, an electric cooling fan, full-width rear taillights, on-board diagnostics an optional automatic transmission—while eliminating the much criticized front under-bumper and rear trunk-lid spoiler of previous series.

In North America, the Series 4 launched for the 1991 model year; 1990 models were the Series 3 with Motronic fuel injection. North American Series 4 models featured power steering, larger knee bolsters and a driver-side airbag also appeared as standard for North American market Spiders, which were available in two configurations: Spider and Spider Veloce. The Veloce substituted leather seats for the base model's vinyl; 15" alloy wheels were one size up from the standard steel wheels with hubcaps; and air conditioning and a cloth top were standard.

Production of the original Spider ended in 1993. An all-new Alfa Spider was presented one year later.

For French market a numbered edition was marketed as the Beauté. 120 units were produced in white and navy blue two-tone, with blue hood and white leather seats.

A limited edition Spider Commemorative Edition (CE) was manufactured for North America as a 1994 model. Each of these 190 carried a small numbered dashboard plaque. The CE carried a special badge on the nose, a "CE" script badge below the "Spider Veloce" emblem on the tail, gold center caps on 15" wheels, and burl wood interior trim. Each came with a leather portfolio, numbered keychain, and documentation. The cars followed the VIN sequence 008276 to 008460.

In Europe this version was also marketed with 1.6 L engine used in series 3, fitted with Weber 40DCOM4/5 carburettors.

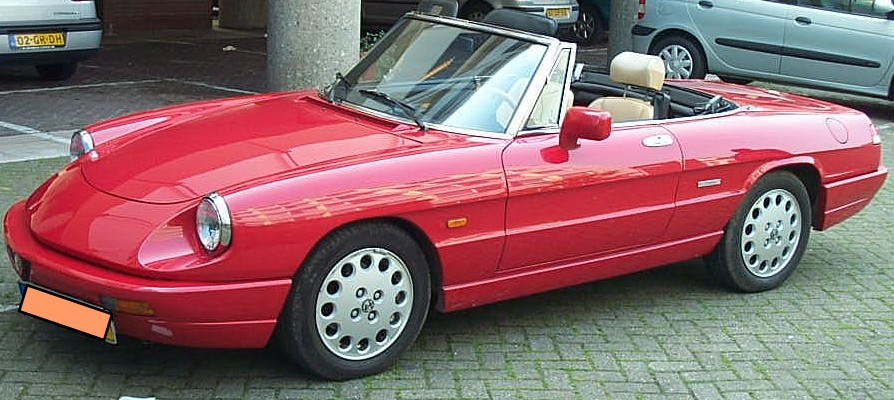
Spider 4th series side profile

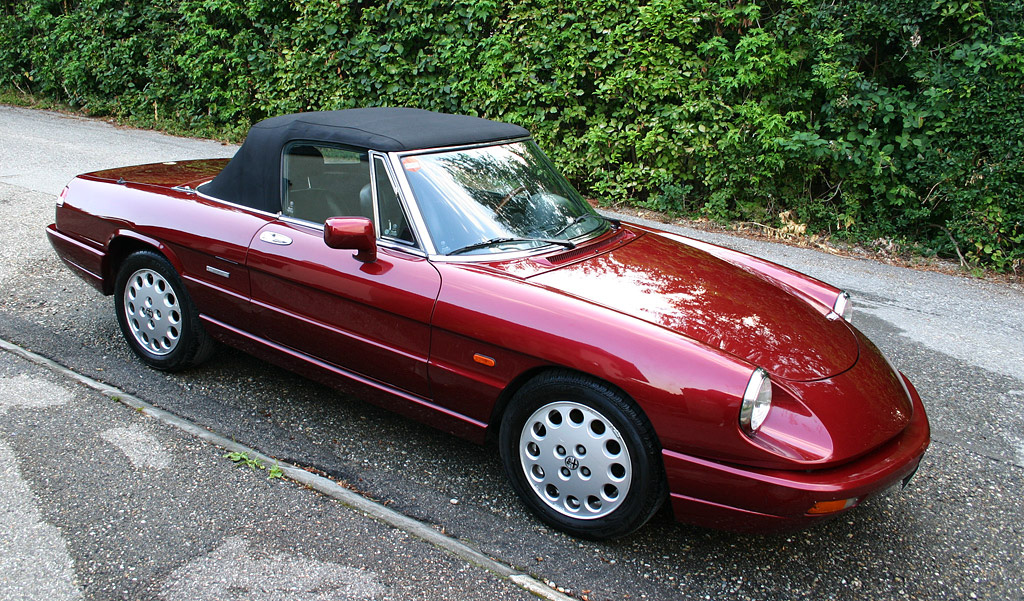
Spider 4th series top closed

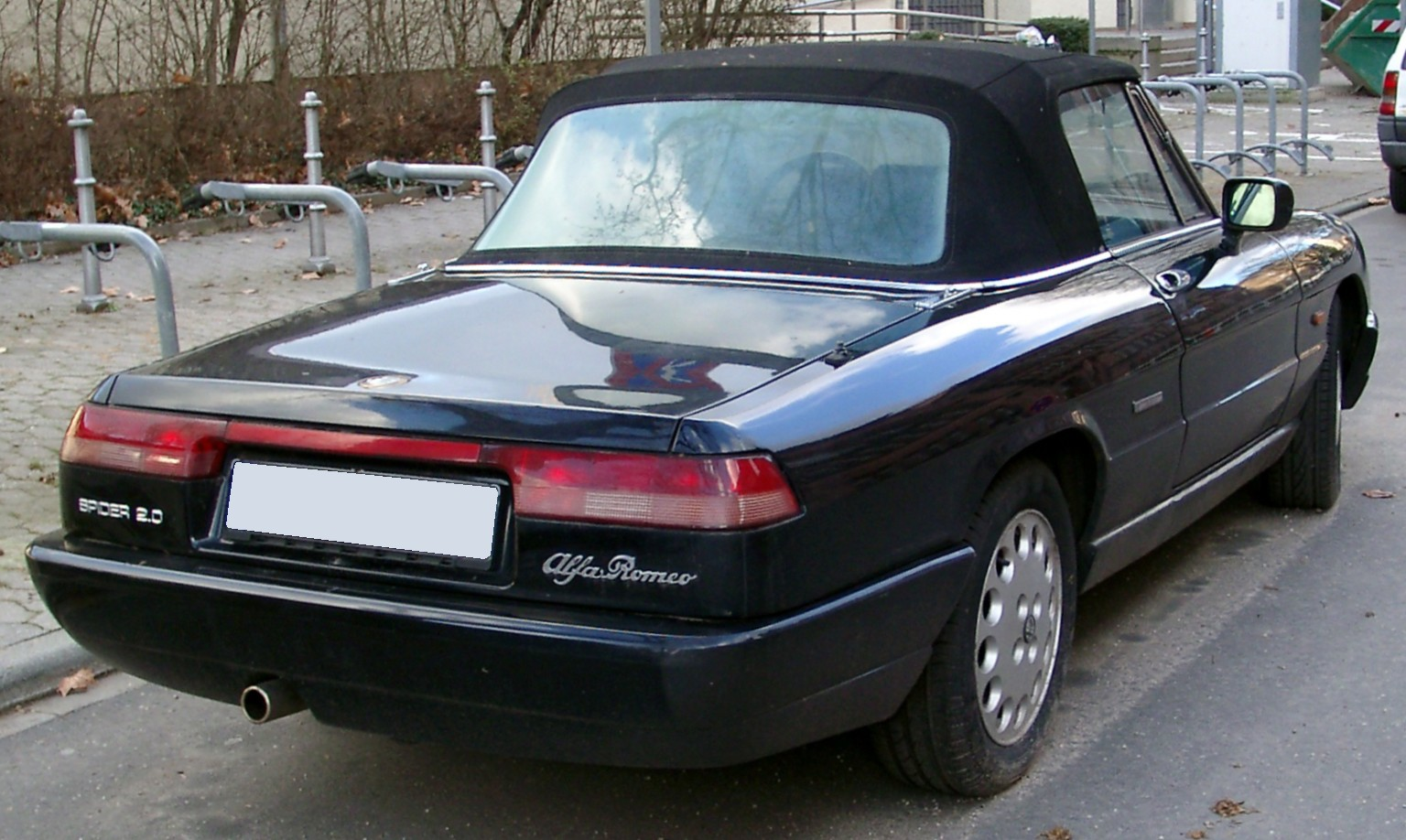
Spider 4th series showing the new rear end

== Production ==
Production of the first generation Alfa Romeo Spider spanned from 1966 to 1993, and amounted to 124,104 cars.

Production by year, 1970–1993
| Year | Units made |
|---|---|
| 1970 | 2,539 |
| 1971 | 3,735 |
| 1972 | 4,121 |
| 1973 | 4,848 |
| 1974 | 5,107 |
| 1975 | 5,189 |
| 1976 | 4,338 |
| 1977 | 4,183 |
| 1978 | 3,868 |
| 1979 | 4,129 |
| 1980 | 5,584 |
| 1981 | 1,653 |
| 1982 | 1,923 |
| 1983 | 5,365 |
| 1984 | 6,587 |
| 1985 | 5,590 |
| 1986 | 7,215 |
| 1987 | 4,339 |
| 1988 | 4,090 |
| 1989 | 3,950 |
| 1990 | 7,106 |
| 1991 | 9,073 |
| 1992 | 3,640 |
| 1993 | 1,956^{[a]} |
| Total; 1970–93 | 110,128 |

^{a} 190 examples produced during 1993 were sold as 1994 models in the United States.

== Generations ==
| Model | Engine | Power | Torque | Years | Production |
|---|---|---|---|---|---|
Series 1': "Duetto", Osso di Seppia or Roundtail
| Spider 1600 | 1,570 cc | 109 PS (80 kW; 108 hp) | 142 N⋅m (105 lb⋅ft) | 1966–1967 | 6,324 |
| 1750 Spider Veloce Euro | 1,779 cc | 118 PS (87 kW; 116 hp) | 168 N⋅m (124 lb⋅ft) | 1967–1969 | 2,500 |
| 1750 Spider Veloce US | 1,779 cc | 132 PS (97 kW; 130 hp) | 168 N⋅m (124 lb⋅ft) | 1968–1969 | 2,000 |
| Spider 1300 Junior | 1,290 cc | 89 PS (65 kW; 88 hp) | 137 N⋅m (101 lb⋅ft) | 1968–1969 | 2,680 |
| Series 1 total production: | | | | | 13,678 |
Series 2: Coda Tronca, Fastback, or Kamm tail
| 1750 Spider Veloce | 1,779 cc | 124 PS (91 kW; 122 hp) | 168 N⋅m (124 lb⋅ft) | 1970–1973 | 4,027 |
| Spider 1300 Junior | 1,290 cc | 89 PS (65 kW; 88 hp) | 137 N⋅m (101 lb⋅ft) | 1970–1977 | 4,557 |
| 2000 Spider Veloce | 1,962 cc | 132 PS (97 kW; 130 hp) | 178 N⋅m (131 lb⋅ft) | 1971–1982 | 38,379^{a} |
| Spider 1600 Junior | 1,570 cc | 110 PS (81 kW; 108 hp) | 137 N⋅m (101 lb⋅ft) | 1972–1981 | 4,848 |
| Series 2 total production: | | | | | 51,811 |
Series 3: Aerodinamica or Duck Tail
| Spider 2000 | 1,962 cc | 128 PS (94 kW; 126 hp) | 178 N⋅m (131 lb⋅ft) | 1982–1989 | 29,210^{b} |
| Spider 1600 | 1,570 cc | 104 PS (76 kW; 103 hp) | 142 N⋅m (105 lb⋅ft) | 1983–1989 | 5,400 |
| Spider Quadrifoglio Verde | 1,962 cc | 125 PS (92 kW; 123 hp) | 178 N⋅m (131 lb⋅ft) | 1985–1989 | 2,598 |
| Series 3 total production: | | | | | 37,208 |
Series 4: Ultima, Bella or Last
| Spider 2000 | 1,962 cc | 126 PS (93 kW; 124 hp) | 166 N⋅m (122 lb⋅ft) | 1990–1993 | 18,456 |
| Spider 1600 | 1,570 cc | 109 PS (80 kW; 108 hp) | 137 N⋅m (101 lb⋅ft) | 1990–1992 | 2,951 |
| Series 4 total production: | | | | | 21,407 |

- ^a Including 22,059 US-market cars
- ^b Including 19,040 US-market cars

== In popular culture ==
Dustin Hoffman's Spider runs out of gas in The Graduate

A 1966 Series 1 Spider 1600 is featured in the 1967 film The Graduate, giving the model widespread visibility. A "Graduate" trim level was subsequently marketed in the United States in the 1980s.

The 2011 animated movie Cars 2 features the minor character Celine Dephare, a classic sports coupé based on the Alfa Romeo Spider, who works as a headlight vendor at the Marché Aux Pièces market in Paris, France. She is notably the only character in the Cars franchise whose eyes are located in the headlights instead of in the windscreen.

== Bibliography ==
- Holmes, Mark (2007). Ultimate Convertibles: Roofless Beauty. London: Kandour. pp. 10–11. ISBN 978-1-905741-62-5.
- Fusi, Luigi (1978). Alfa Romeo—Tutte le vetture dal 1910—All cars from 1910 (3rd ed.). Milan: Emmeti Grafica editrice.
