= Paolo Pininfarina =

Italian businessman (1958–2024)

- Born: 28 August 1958; Turin, Italy
- Died: 9 April 2024 (aged 65); Turin, Italy
- Education: Politecnico di Torino
- Known for: Being CEO of Pininfarina, 2008–2024
- Predecessor: Andrea Pininfarina, 2001–2008
- Parents: Sergio Pininfarina; Giorgia Gianolio
- Relatives: Andrea Pininfarina, brother

Paolo Pininfarina (28 August 1958 – 9 April 2024) was an Italian engineer, designer and businessman, known as the manager, from 2008, of the Pininfarina design company.

== Life and career ==
Pininfarina studied mechanical engineering at Politecnico di Torino before joining his father Sergio Pininfarina's firm in 1982, as a trainee stationed abroad with Cadillac and Honda (1983), and then as quality manager of the Cadillac Allanté project (1984–86) and program manager of the Engineering GM 200 at General Motors (1987–89) which led to Chevrolet Lumina APV, Oldsmobile Silhouette and Pontiac Trans Sport. Paolo Pininfarina became the first manager of the new Pininfarina Extra S.r.l. (1987) which does design for non-automotive industries (furniture, appliances, maritime), while being in the upper management of the automobile firm as well (board member 1988, deputy chairman 2006) where he was chairman from 2008 until his death, succeeding his brother Andrea Pininfarina (1957–2008).

Pininfarina was member in the board of Turin's Istituto Europeo di Design (1996–2004) and was emeritus participating founder of the Associazione per il Disegno Industriale of Milan.

Pininfarina died on 9 April 2024, at the age of 65. One of the last interviews he did was with West Coast Midnight Run publication in 2018 in which he discussed the firm, the future of mobility and the European Union with Senior Editor Pierre Maertin, a small excerpt of which is profiled at their blog venue and the entire interview is included in their Art Book editions online.
