= Battista Pininfarina =

Italian automobile designer 1896–1966

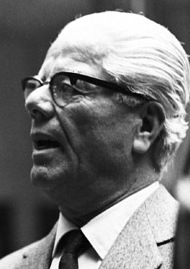

Personal details
- Born: Giovanni Battista Farina; 2 November 1893 Cortanze, Piedmont, Kingdom of Italy
- Died: 3 April 1966 (aged 72) Lausanne, Vaud, Switzerland
- Relatives: Giovanni Carlo Farina (brother)
- Occupation: Automobile designer
- Awards: Compasso d'Oro; Order of Merit for Labour; Royal Designer for Industry (honorary)
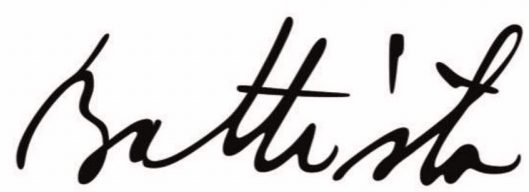
- Signature

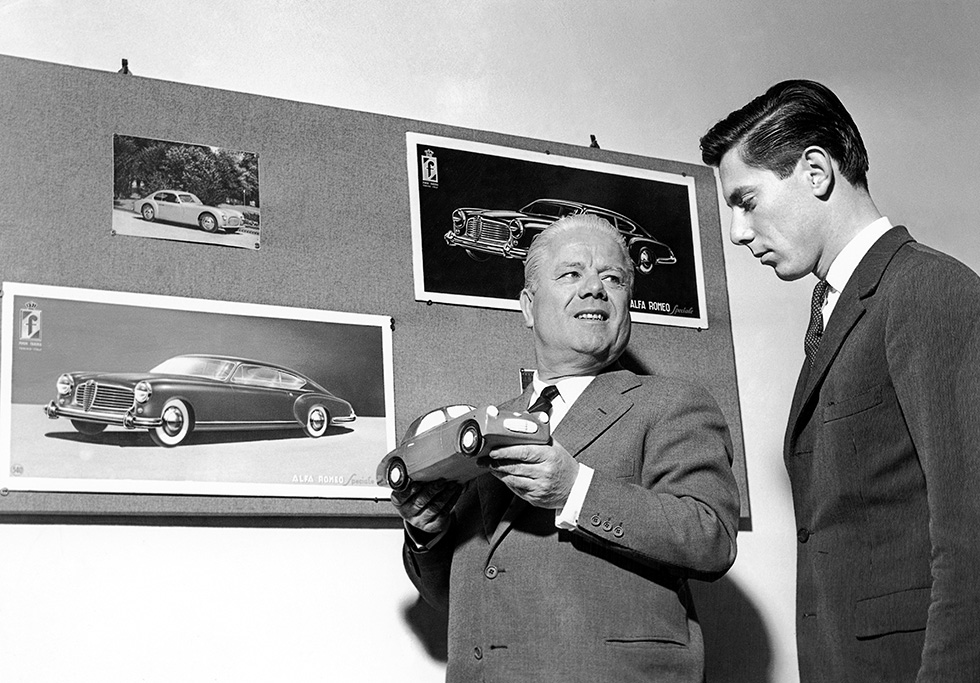
Battista "Pinin" Farina and his son Sergio, c. 1950

Giovanni Battista Pininfarina (born Giovanni Battista Farina, nicknamed "Pinin"; 2 November 1893 – 3 April 1966) was an Italian automobile designer and the founder of the Carrozzeria Pininfarina coachbuilding company, a name associated with many well known postwar cars.

== Early life ==
Giovanni Battista Farina was born in Cortanze, in the region of Piedmont. The tenth of eleven children, his nickname, Pinin, referred to the fact that he was the last one joining his brother's body shop. He started working in his brother Giovanni Carlo's body shop at the age of 12, and it was there that his interest in cars was born. He stayed at Giovanni Carlo's Stabilimenti Farina for decades, learning bodywork and beginning to design his own cars.

== Carrozzeria Pininfarina and career ==
He formed Carrozzeria Pinin Farina in 1930 to focus on the design and construction of new car bodies, and quickly gained prominence. Only Carrozzeria Touring was more sought after in the 1930s. His work for Ferrari, starting in 1952, would become his most famous, though much of it was managed by his son, Sergio, who ran the firm until shortly before his death, on 3 July 2012. Sometime in the early 1950s, Stabilimenti Farina was absorbed into the by now much larger Carrozzeria Pinin Farina.

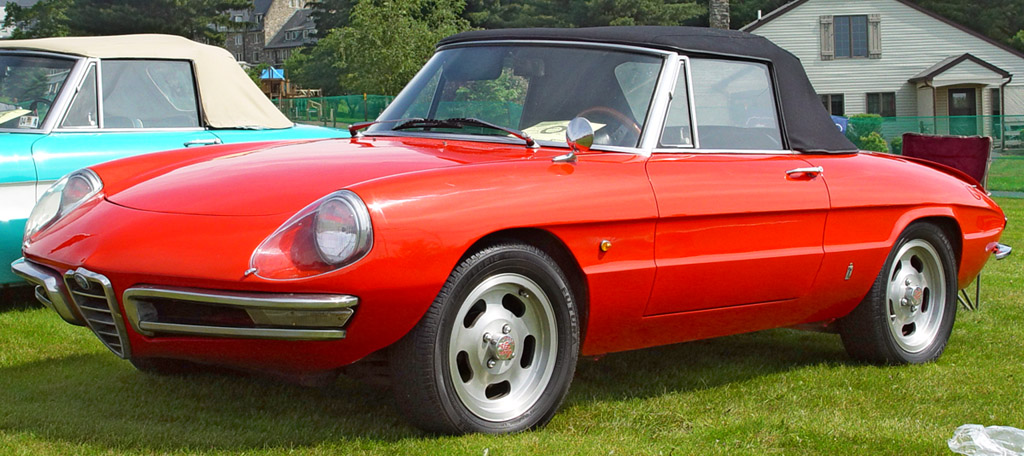
Duetto by Battista Pininfarina

The last design he contributed to was the 1600 Duetto for Alfa Romeo with Aldo Brovarone, which debuted at the Geneva Motor Show in March 1966. He died less than a month later, on 3 April.

== Personal life and family ==
He officially changed his name to "Battista Pininfarina" in 1961.

His nephew, Nino Farina, was the first Formula One world champion.

== Honours and namesakes ==
- 1957 Compasso d'Oro Gran Premio nazionale career award
- He was inducted into the Automotive Hall of Fame in 2004.
- The Pininfarina Battista all-electric battery-powered sports car is named in his honour.

== See also ==
- Carrozzeria Pininfarina, the company he founded in 1930
- Automobili Pininfarina, a subsidiary company
