= Sergio Pininfarina =

Italian politician

Senator for life Sergio Pininfarina
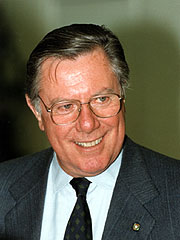

Member of the Senate of the Republic
- Life tenure 23 September 2005 – 3 July 2012
- Appointed by: Carlo Azeglio Ciampi

Personal details
- Born: 8 September 1926 Turin, Kingdom of Italy
- Died: 3 July 2012 (aged 85) Turin, Italy
- Party: Independent
- Spouse: Giorgia Gianolio
- Children: Andrea; Paolo
- Education: Polytechnic University of Turin

Sergio Pininfarina (born Sergio Farina; 8 September 1926 – 3 July 2012) was an Italian automobile designer and Senator for life.

== Biography ==
=== Automobile designer ===
Pininfarina was born in Turin. After joining his father Battista Farina at Carrozzeria Pininfarina, he quickly became integral to the company and, during his career, oversaw many of the designs (particularly Ferraris) for which the company is famous. In 1961, by decree of the Italian president, his family surname was changed from Farina to Pininfarina to match that of the company.

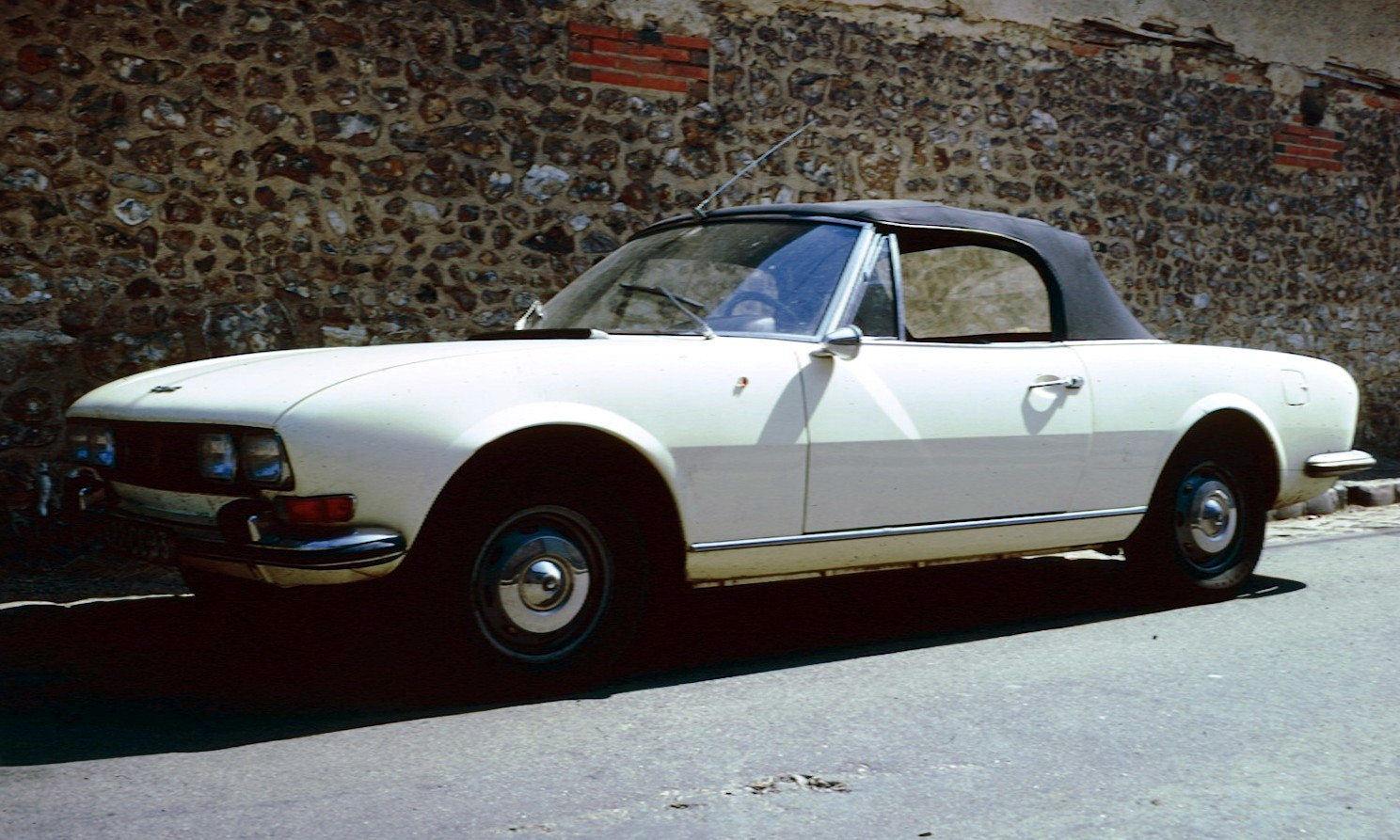
Sergio Pininfarina's design for the Peugeot 504 Cabriolet created a car described recently in Auto, Motor und Sport as "the most beautiful Peugeot to date".

In 1965 it was Sergio Pininfarina who personally persuaded Enzo Ferrari to adopt a "rear-mid" engine configuration for a new line of road cars, with the engine positioned behind the driver, but ahead of the rear wheels. The resulting concept car, Ferrari 365 P Berlinetta Speciale was presented at the Paris Motor Show in October, although it would be another two years before the cars were offered for sale.

After his father died in 1966, Pininfarina became chairman of the company.

In 2006 Sergio and his son Andrea, who died in 2008, were named Honorary Chairmen of Pininfarina.

=== Politics ===
Between 1979 and 1988, Pininfarina was a Liberal Party MEP, where his party was a part of the European Liberal Democrat alliance.

=== Senator for Life ===
On 23 September 2005, he was named Senator for Life of the Italian Republic by Carlo Azeglio Ciampi (together with Giorgio Napolitano).

On 21 February 2007, he attended the vote in which the government motion on foreign policy was defeated in the Senate. Subsequently, he led to the resignation of then Prime Minister Romano Prodi. Pininfarina, who attended his first Senate assembly in nine months, cast an "abstain" vote, which helped the opposition forces to defeat the government's foreign policy. After the aforementioned tally Pininfarina did not ever vote in the assembly again.

=== Death ===
Pininfarina died in Turin on 3 July 2012 aged 85.
