= Pininfarina Battista =

Electric performance car

- Pininfarina Battista (production version)

Overview
- Manufacturer: Automobili Pininfarina
- Also called: PF0 (internal codename)
- Production: 2022–2025 (150 units)
- Assembly: Croatia: Sveta Nedelja (Bugatti Rimac Ltd./Rimac Automobili d.o.o.); Italy: Cambiano (Pininfarina SpA: hand-crafted; final assembly)
- Designer: Luca Borgogno at Pininfarina

Body and chassis
- Class: Sports car (S)
- Body style: 2-door coupé
- Layout: Individual-wheel drive
- Related: Rimac Nevera

Powertrain
- Electric motor: 4 liquid-cooled permanent magnet synchronous electric motors placed at each wheel
- Power output: 1,417 kW (1,927 PS; 1,900 bhp)
- Battery: Rimac 120 kW⋅h Lithium Nickel Manganese Cobalt Oxide (LiNiMnCoO_{2})
- Electric range: 500 km (310 mi)

Dimensions
- Wheelbase: 2,745 mm (108.1 in)
- Length: 4,912 mm (193.4 in)
- Width: 2,240 mm (88.2 in) (incl. mirrors)
- Height: 1,214 mm (47.8 in)
- Kerb weight: 2,302 kg (5,075 lb)

The Pininfarina Battista is an electric performance car manufactured by Automobili Pininfarina GmbH which is headquartered in Munich, Germany, with roots in the Italian car design firm and coachbuilder Pininfarina. The name Battista is a tribute to Pininfarina's founder Battista Pininfarina. The car was publicly unveiled at the 2019 Geneva Motor Show. It is the first Pininfarina-branded car.

== Specifications and features ==
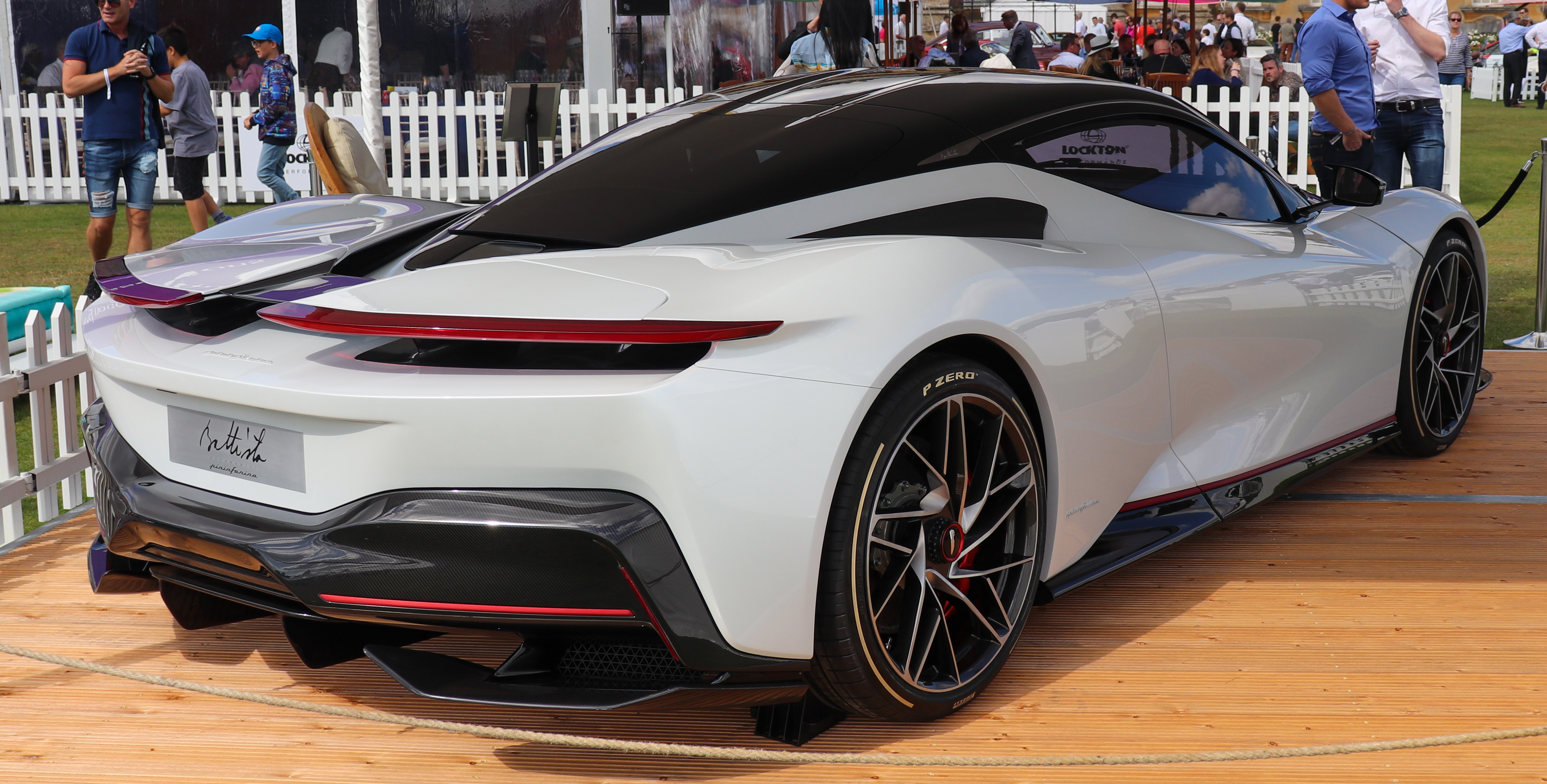
Rear view

The Battista is powered by a 120 kW⋅h battery pack supplied by Rimac Automobili. The car has four individual motors, each placed at a wheel, and they have a combined power output of 1400 kW and 2300 Nm of torque.

The car has a carbon fibre monocoque chassis with aluminium crash structures at the front and rear. Most of the body panels are also built from the same material resulting in a low mass. The car has 21" rims in Pirelli P Zero Corsa tyres.

The adjustable suspension system of the car will be tuned for maximum road comfort. The car has five driving modes all of which alter the power generated by the powertrain. The car features carbon ceramic brake discs measuring 390 mm at the front and rear and is equipped with six-piston calipers front and aft. The active rear wing acts as an airbrake to improve stopping power.

The interior of the car is customisable according to the customer's specifications. A carbon fibre steering wheel is flanked by two large screens on either side, displaying vital data to the driver. The interior is upholstered in leather. The car is claimed by the manufacturer to generate cabin driving sound using acoustics.

The battery pack is T-shaped and is placed so that it lies in the central tunnel and behind the seats. Once fully charged, the battery pack allows the car to have a range of 450 km.

== Performance ==
The Battista accelerates from 0 to 100 km/h in 1.89 seconds, 0 to 300 km/h in 10.49 seconds, and has a top speed of 358.03 km/h (222 MPH).

== Production ==
Production of the Battista began in 2022 de, with a limit of 150 units. The units will be equally allocated among prospective buyers from North America, Europe, Asia and Middle East. Each car is hand-built at the dedicated Pininfarina facility located in Cambiano, Italy. 40 percent of the car's production was already reserved before the car's introduction.

In June 2019, Automobili Pininfarina unveiled a revised version of the Battista performance car in Turin, Italy. The new design elements come as the model advances through its development programme, towards the simulation, wind tunnel and development drive stages. Changes made to the design include a more aggressive front end and revised wing mirrors having stalks similar to LaFerrari.

=== Battista Anniversario ===
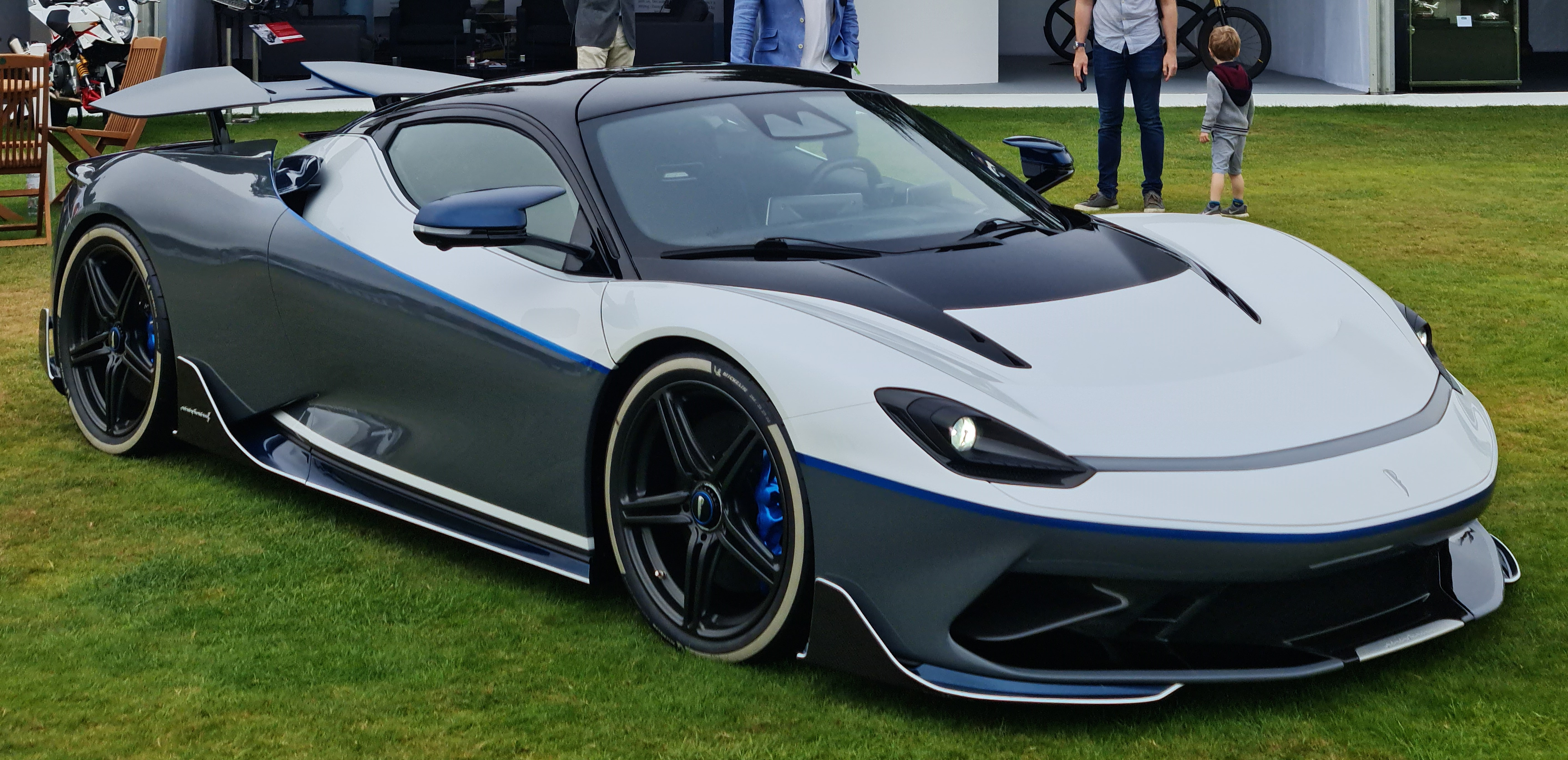
Battista Anniversario

On 22 May 2020 Automobili Pininfarina unveiled a special edition of the Battista called the Anniversario. Each Battista Anniversario is hand-painted in Cambiano. The car needs to be disassembled and reassembled three times before it obtains its final livery. The colour scheme is an homage to the Piedmont environment, where Battista "Pinin" Farina worked and lived: Bianco Setriere, Grigio Antonelliano, and the Pininfarina signature colour, the Iconica Blu. To go alongside the new color scheme Automobili Pininfarina created a new wheel design: the Impulso. These centre-lock forged aluminium wheels represent an upgrade not only in aesthetics but also in car performance, thanks to a 10-kilo weight reduction compared to Battista wheels. The rear pair has been enlarged from 20-inch to 21-inch to enable greater traction when driving in high-performance environments.

The Battista Anniversario features a set of aerodynamic enhancements in a set called the "Furiosa Package" this includes: A carbon fibre front splitter, side blades and a rear diffuser that work together to grant increased downforce and improved stability at high cornering speeds.

=== Battista Nino Farina ===
Battista Edizione Nino Farina is a limited edition of just 5 vehicles, named after Giuseppe "Nino" Farina a first Formula One World Champion and a nephew of Battista Pininfarina. This edition debuted at the 2023 Goodwood Festival of Speed.

=== Battista Targamerica ===
Battista Targamerica is a one-off, open top variant of the Battista. It was commissioned by Michael Jordan and features a roof-less design, unique five-spoke wheel design and a custom aluminum and glass cigar humidor. Targamerica is the very first coachbuilt one-off special with livery inspired by the Ferrari Testarossa Spider of Gianni Agnelli.

== See also ==
- List of fastest production cars by acceleration
- List of production cars by power output
