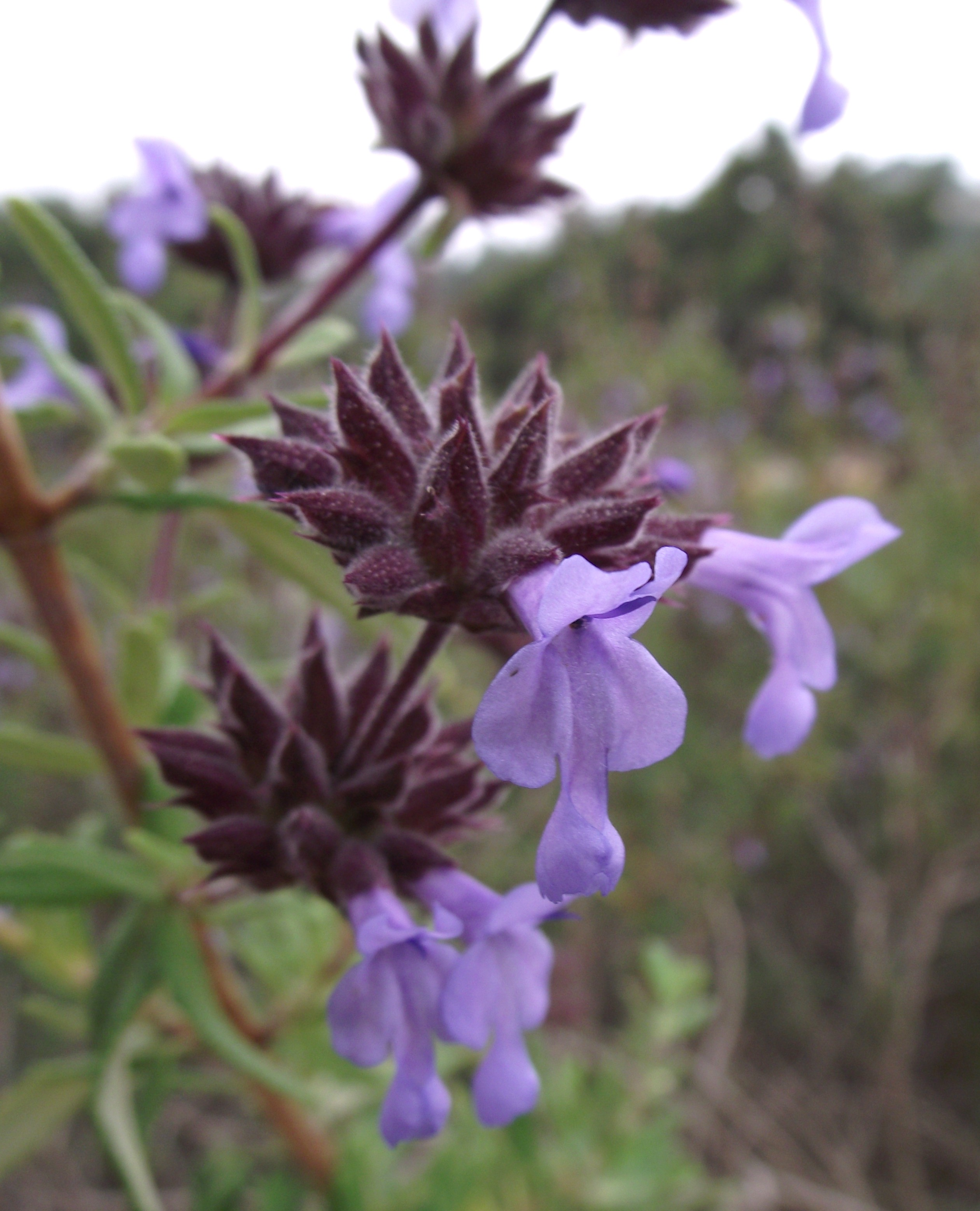

Conservation status
- Imperiled (NatureServe)

Scientific classification
- Kingdom: Plantae
- Clade: Embryophytes
- Clade: Tracheophytes
- Clade: Angiosperms
- Clade: Eudicots
- Clade: Asterids
- Order: Lamiales
- Family: Lamiaceae
- Genus: Salvia
- Species: S. brandegeei

Binomial name
- Salvia brandegeei Munz

Synonyms
- Salvia mellifera subsp. revoluta (Brandegee) Abrams

= Salvia brandegeei =

Brandegee's sage

Species of shrub

Salvia brandegeei is a perennial evergreen shrub in the mint family known by the common names Santa Rosa Island sage or Brandegee's sage. It is a fragrant plant characterized by lavender flowers and dark green leaves. For many years, it was thought to be native only to Santa Rosa Island, one of the Channel Islands of California, until it was discovered along the coast of Baja California. It is threatened by development and mining along the mainland portions of its range, but otherwise has a stable population on Santa Rosa Island.

== Description ==
This plant has dark green scalloped leaves and pale lavender flowers in tightly spaced whorls. The violet-gray calyx, combined with the wide open flower lips, make it a very showy flower.

=== Morphology ===
This plant grows as a shrub, typically greater than 1 meter in height, or in a prostrate form. This species is heterostylous. The hairs (trichomes) on this plant are branched. The leaves are 2 to 6 cm long, with the leaf blade shaped linear to linear-elliptic. The leaves are adaxially (upper surface) glabrous, and abaxially (lower surface) densely white-hairy. The margins (edges) of the leaves are rolled under, with small, rounded teeth.

The inflorescence has clusters 1.5 to 2 cm wide. The bracts are shaped ovate, with sharp tips. The flower has a calyx 7 to 8 mm large, with long hairs, and the upper lip minutely 3-lobed. The corolla tube is 7 to 8 mm long, colored a pale blue to lavender, with the upper lip 3 to 3.5 mm long, and the lower lip 3 to 4 mm long. The stamens are more or less included (not projecting beyond the mouth of the corolla).

== Taxonomy ==
This plant was originally placed as a subspecies of Salvia mellifera, of which it resembles slightly, but it is heterostylous. This species is named after Townshend and Mary Katharine Brandegee, a husband and wife duo of pioneering western botanists who collected plants throughout California and Baja California.

== Distribution and habitat ==
This species can be found on Santa Rosa Island, California and on a strip of coast in Baja California. This plant is widespread on Santa Rosa Island, even becoming co-dominant in numerous large, healthy populations. It is found in the shrubland on the island. In Baja California, the plant is found on the immediate coast from the vicinity of Ensenada south to San Quintin, in a 40-mile long strip. It is found in Baja California in habitats of maritime succulent scrub and chaparral.

== Conservation ==
In total, this plant's population is not very large, as it is only found on Santa Rosa Island and a portion of the Baja California coast. This plant is fairly widespread and has a healthy population on Santa Rosa Island, although it was previously threatened by overgrazing from non-native herbivores. In Baja California, development along the coast and mining are threats, although there are limited details of these pressures. A NatureServe assessment places this species as G2, imperiled.

== Cultivation ==
In cultivation, the plant will reach 4–5 feet tall and up to 7 feet (2.1 m) wide. It likes full sun, dry conditions, and will grow on sandy or clay soil. It can tolerate temperatures down to 0 °F for several hours.
