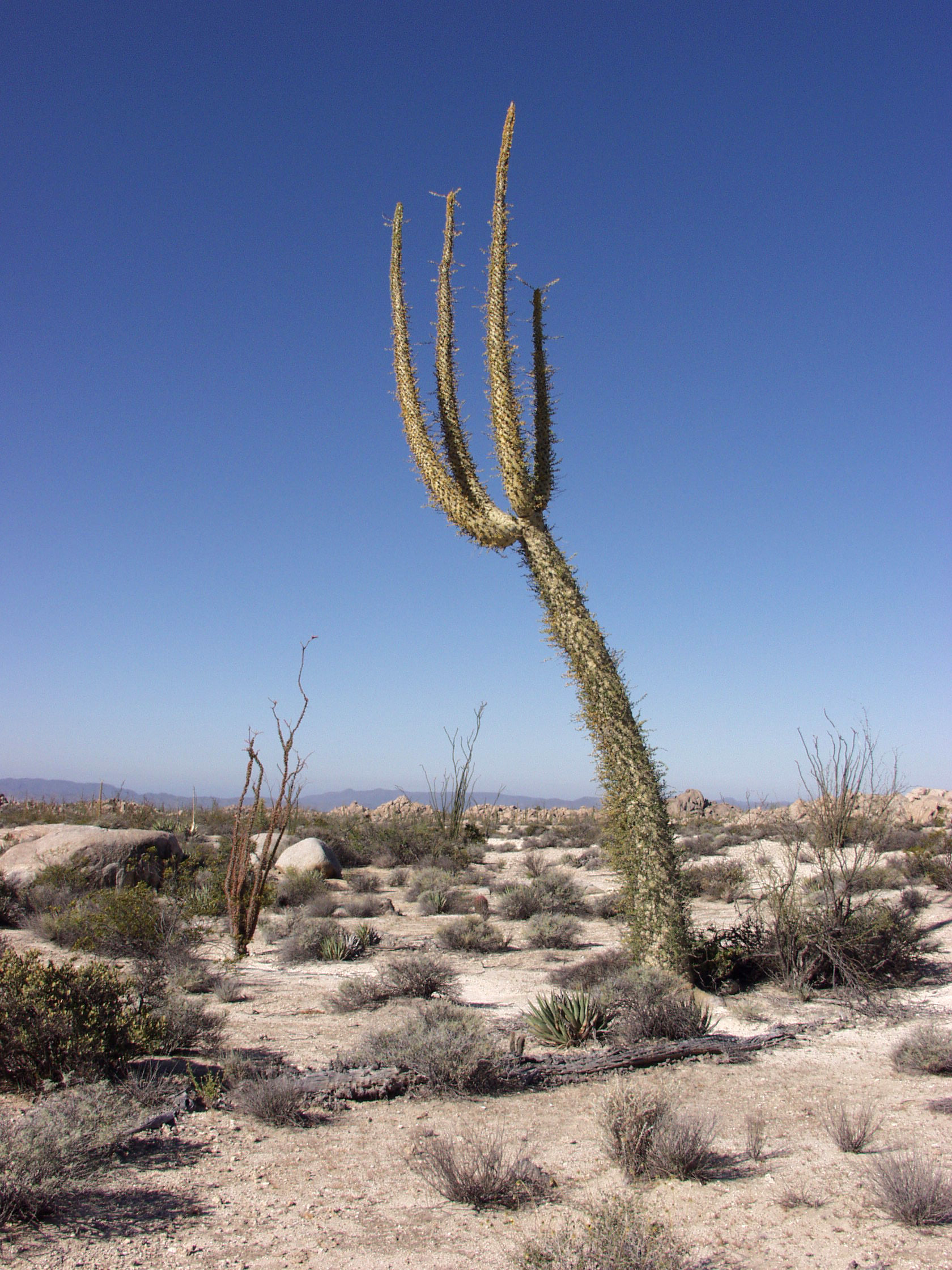
- Boojum tree in Baja California desert, Cataviña region.

Scientific classification
- Kingdom: Plantae
- Clade: Tracheophytes
- Clade: Angiosperms
- Clade: Eudicots
- Clade: Asterids
- Order: Ericales
- Family: Fouquieriaceae
- Genus: Fouquieria
- Species: F. columnaris

Binomial name
- Fouquieria columnaris (Kellogg) Kellogg ex Curran
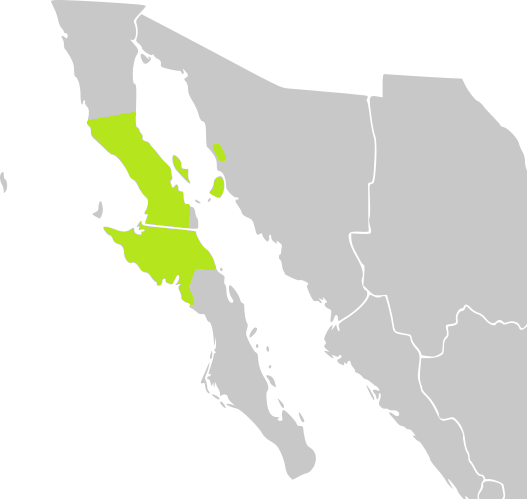

Synonyms
- Idria columnaris Kellogg; Fouquieria gigantea Orcutt

= Fouquieria columnaris =

Species of flowering plant

Fouquieria columnaris, the Boojum tree or cirio (Latin American Spanish: [ˈsiɾjo]) is a tree in the ocotillo family, whose other members include the ocotillos. Some taxonomists place it in the separate genus Idria. It is nearly endemic to the Baja California Peninsula (both the northern and southern states), with only a small population in the Sierra Bacha of Sonora, Mexico. The plant's English name, Boojum, was given by Godfrey Sykes of the Desert Laboratory in Tucson, Arizona, and is taken from Lewis Carroll's poem "The Hunting of the Snark".

== Description ==
This plant is a columniform, upwardly tapering tree. The central axis of the plant is homologous to the single stem of other species. It has a cortical water-storage network, a feature unique to the family.

The Fouquieria columnaris trunk is up to 24 inches (61 centimeters) thick, off-white in color, with few or no major branches and with numerous thin, twiggy branches sticking out at right angles, all covered with small leaves 1.5–4 cm (0.59–1.57 in) long. They can grow to a height of 20 meters (almost 70 feet), but the tallest, in Montevideo Valley between Mission San Borja and Bahia de los Angeles is 86.5 feet (26.4 meters) in height, the second tallest succulent after Euphorbia ampliphylla.

The flowers bloom in August and September regardless of rainfall; they occur in short racemes, and have a honey scent. The flowers have short, cream-yellow corollas, with the limb of the petals inflexing around the filaments of the stamens. The anthers and stamens protrude out, while the stigma is protected by the inflexed petal limbs. The flowers are visited by at least 15 species of bees in 11 genera, who pry open the inflexed corolla limbs to obtain the sweetened nectar and contact the protected stigma.

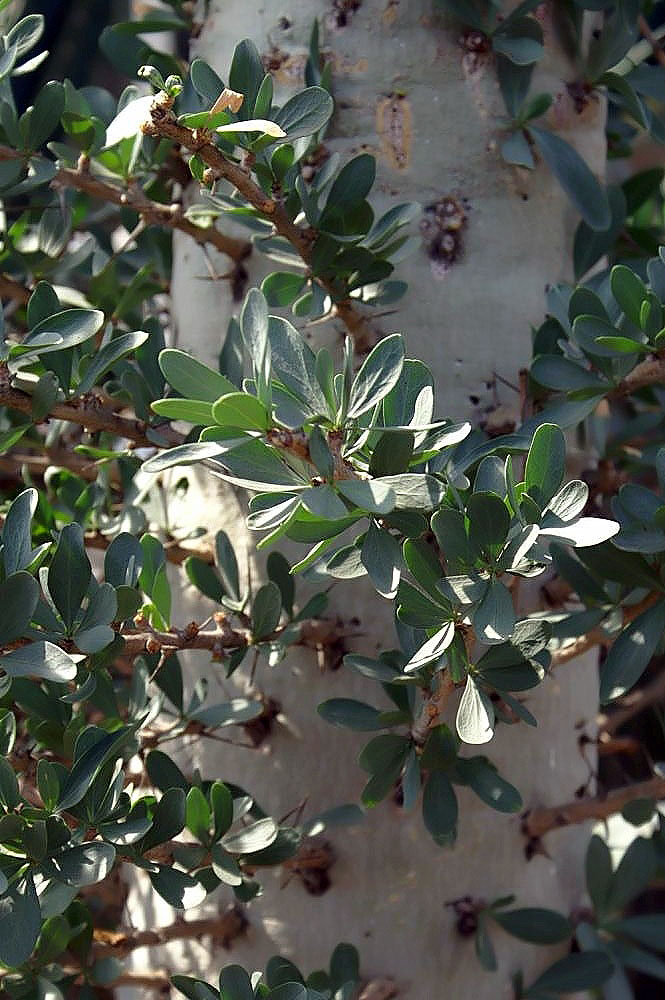
Detail of the trunk

It is among the slowest growing trees. At fifty years of age, it may be only five feet (1.5 meters) tall, and thereafter averages twelve inches (thirty centimeters) every ten years.

== Taxonomy ==
This species is most similar to two Fouquieria native to south-central Mexico, Fouquieria fasciculata and Fouquieria purpusii, as they share a succulent xylem, widely spaced decurrent leaf bases, and small decandrous (ten-stamen) flowers. In the two species, they are initially woody, and their succulent xylem develops only in the lower portion of their main stem. In contrast, the Boojum tree has a succulent xylem from its initiation, with the primary thickening occurring from the meristem. The chromosome number of this species is 36.

=== Taxonomic history ===
This species was first described by Albert Kellogg based on specimens that were collected by a J. A. Veatch in Baja California. The type description was published twice and nearly identically, in the Proceedings of the California Academy of Natural Sciences and the San Francisco monthly periodical Hesperian in May 1860. Because the exact date of the publication in the Proceedings is unknown, but is likely to be after 1862, the type description in the Hesperian has the priority. The holotype specimen was destroyed in the San Francisco earthquake and fire of 1906.

This species was previously placed in the monotypic genus Idria. However, this taxonomic classification was created before the vegetative and floral structures of F. fasciculata and F. purpursii were understood, as these two species share intermediate characteristics between the genera Idria and Fouquieria. As many other genera (Pachypodium, Euphorbia, Jatropha and Coreopsis) contain both woody and succulent species, and because there are few diagnostic characteristics to separate major groups within the family, the genus Idria has been merged into Fouquieria.

== Distribution and habitat ==
This species occurs from sea level to up to 1450 meters in elevation on deep to shallow volcanic loams or clays to decomposed granite soils, on well-drained sites on hillsides, mesa, and alluvial plains. It is found from the vicinity of San Quintín in Baja California south to the Tres Vírgenes complex of volcanoes in Baja California Sur; a notable concentration is the Boojum Forest. It is also found on Isla Angel de la Guarda in the Gulf of California. On mainland Mexico, it is also found in a small area south of Puerto Libertad in coastal Sonora. The annual rainfall within its region only averages about 73 to 140 mm, mainly from January to April and in lesser amounts in August through September. Rainfall is unreliable and sometimes years may pass without heavy rainfall.

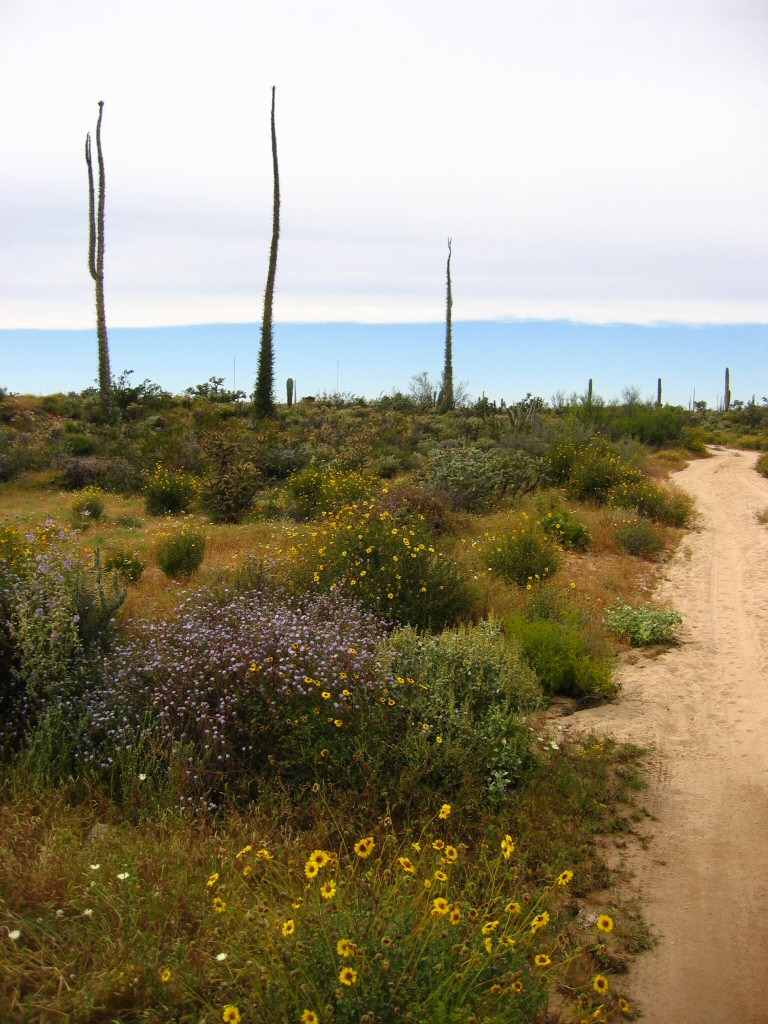
Numerous plants on the horizon

The peculiar distribution pattern of the mainland boojums has led Mexican botanists to conclude that they were probably transplanted to the mainland by the indigenous Seri people, who lived in this area and still live on communal property south of this location. The Seri name for this plant is cototaj Seri pronunciation: [ˈkototax]. In Seri belief, the cototaj were once people, and touching this plant will cause strong winds to blow (an undesirable state). Given this belief, the hypothesis that the Seri people transplanted it is very doubtful. Furthermore, recent studies of fossil pollen have found that F. columnaris once occurred in a much larger area along the coast of Sonora, so it is almost certain that the extant mainland population simply represents a remnant of the former, much larger range of this species.

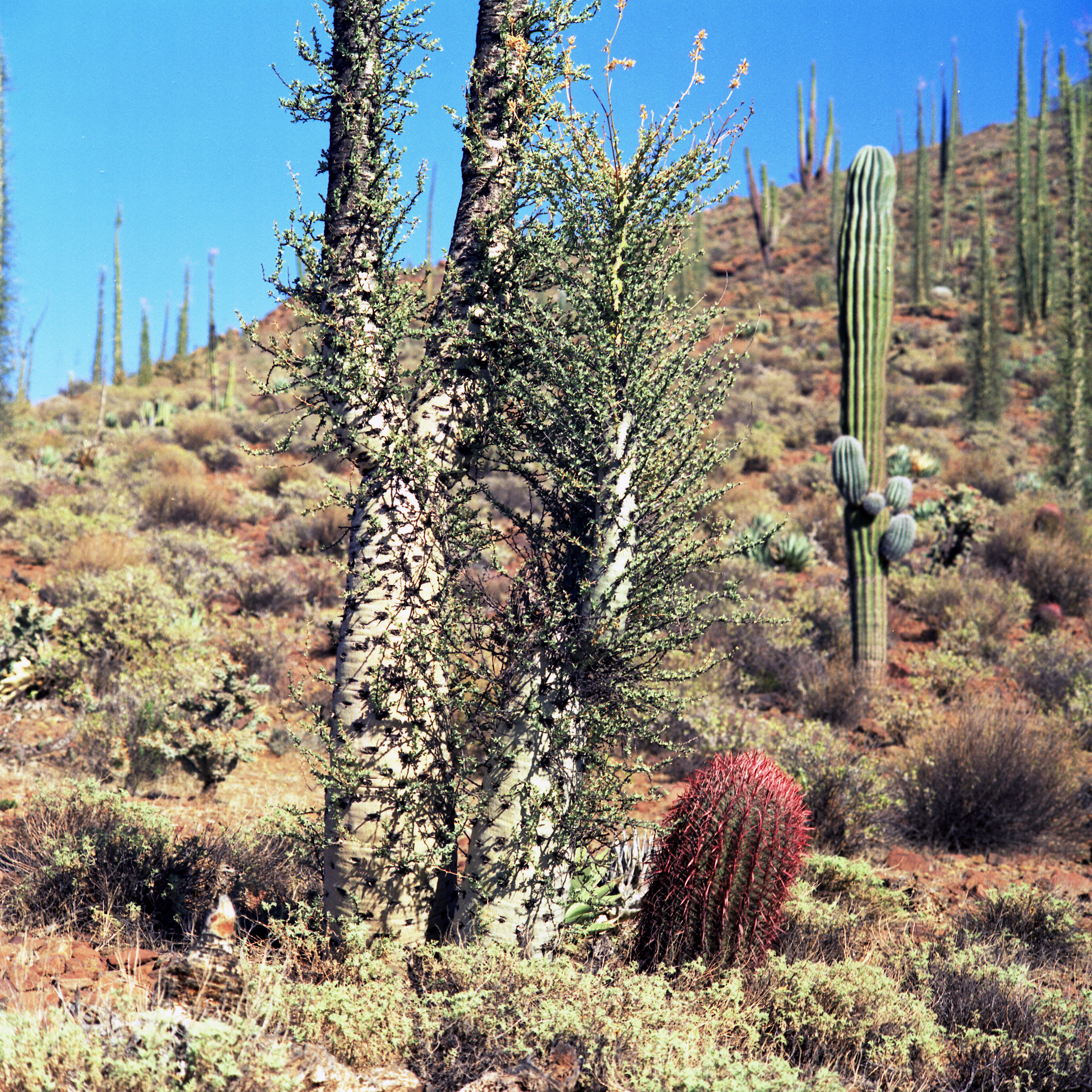
Growing with Ferocactus pilosus.
