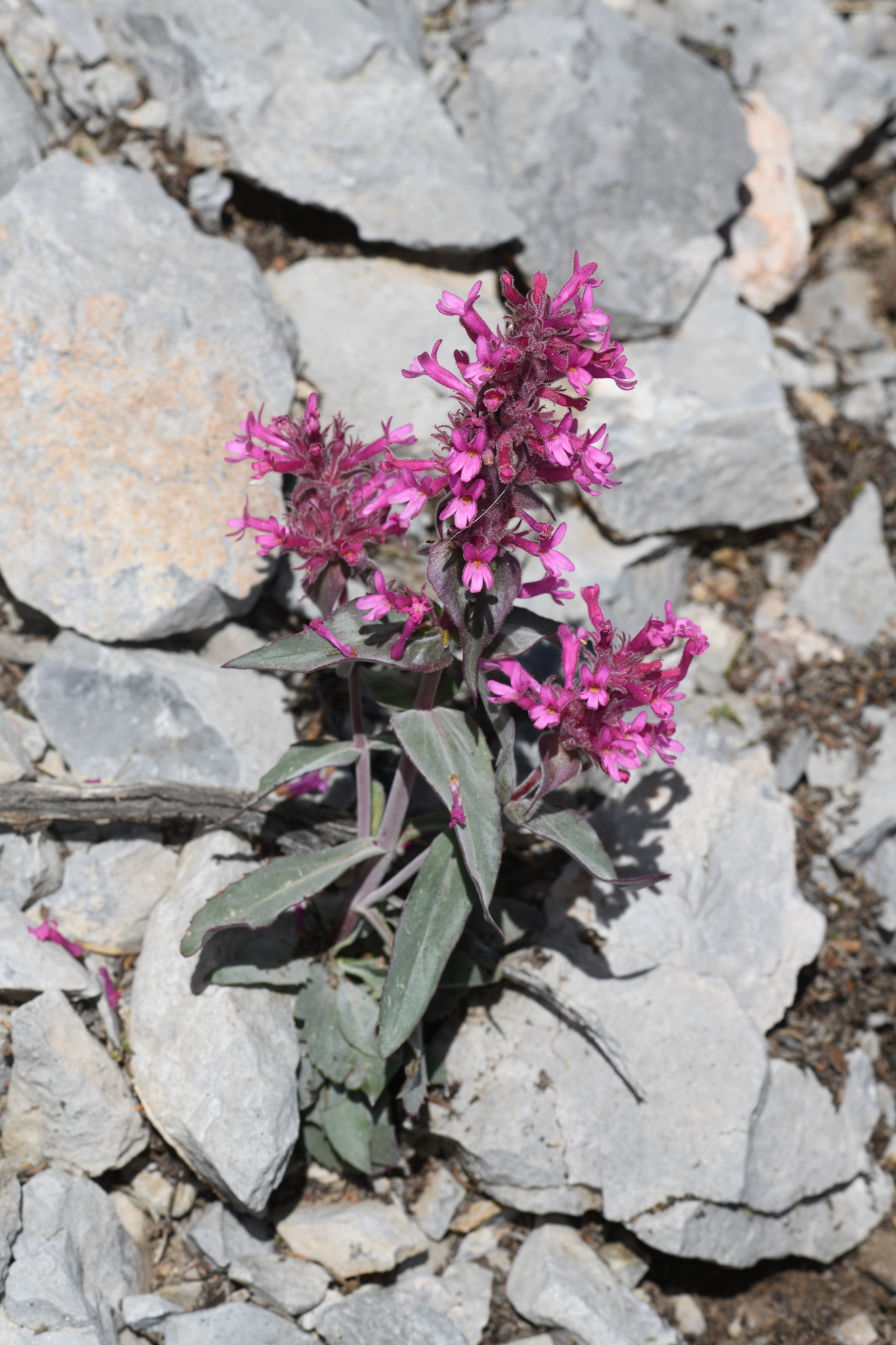
- Blooming in Death Valley National Park

Conservation status
- Imperiled (NatureServe)

Scientific classification
- Kingdom: Plantae
- Clade: Tracheophytes
- Clade: Angiosperms
- Clade: Eudicots
- Clade: Asterids
- Order: Lamiales
- Family: Plantaginaceae
- Genus: Penstemon
- Species: P. calcareus

Binomial name
- Penstemon calcareus Brandegee

Synonyms
- Penstemon desertorum M.E.Jones

= Penstemon calcareus =

Plant species in the plantain family

Penstemon calcareus is a species of penstemon known by the common name limestone penstemon. It is native to California, where it is known from the deserts of central San Bernardino County, as well as the Death Valley area, where its distribution extends just over the border into Nevada. It grows in scrub and woodland, often on limestone substrates.

== Description ==
Penstemon calcareus has stems that grow to between 5 and 35 centimeters (2 and 14 in) tall that grow directly upward from the base of the plant or grow outwards as short distance and then curving to grow upwards. They are herbaceous and covered in fine, backwards pointing hairs that give the stems a gray appearance like being covered in dust. The tops of the stems are densely covered in glands. The plant grows perennially from a woody caudex at ground level.

It has both cauline and basal leaves, ones attached to the stems and those that grow directly from the base of the plant, that are somewhat leathery and have the same backwards pointing hairs as the stems. The basal leaves and the lower cauline leaves are attached to the plant by petioles and measure 1.5 to 5.5 centimeters long and 0.6 to 2.5 cm wide. Their shape may be elliptic to broadly ovate with a tapered base and either faint serrations or a smooth edge. Further up the stem the leaves are lanceolate to oblanceolate and longer, 2.5–7.5 cm long. These leaves also lack petioles and instead have their base clasping the main stem.

The inflorescence produces bright pink to purplish tubular or funnel-shaped flowers between 1.3 and 1.7 centimeters long. The flower has a glandular outer surface and a staminode 7 to 9 millimeter long that covered with golden hairs.

== Taxonomy ==
Penstemon calcareus was scientifically described in 1903 by Townshend Stith Brandegee. It has one heterotypic synonym, Penstemon desertorum that was published by Marcus E. Jones in 1908.

=== Names ===
Penstemon calcareus is known by the common names limestone penstemon or limestone beardtongue.

== Range and habitat ==
The range of limestone penstemon includes two Californian counties, Inyo and San Bernardino, and also Esmeralda County, Nevada. Most of its range is in California with one just one population in Nevada discovered in Death Valley National Park in 2003. Its range is spread out over 20,000 to 200,000 square kilometers, but only has a few populations. In this area it grows on mountains within the Mojave Desert at elevations of 1,200 to 2,000 meters (3,900 to 6,600 ft) above sea level.

It will often grow in limestone crevices and rocky slopes. It is associated with pinyon–juniper woodlands and Joshua tree scrublands.

=== Conservation ===
The conservation organization NatureServe evaluated Penstemon calcareus in 2010 as imperiled at a global level (G2). They found it to have a long term decline in numbers of 30 to 70%.

== See also ==
List of Penstemon species
