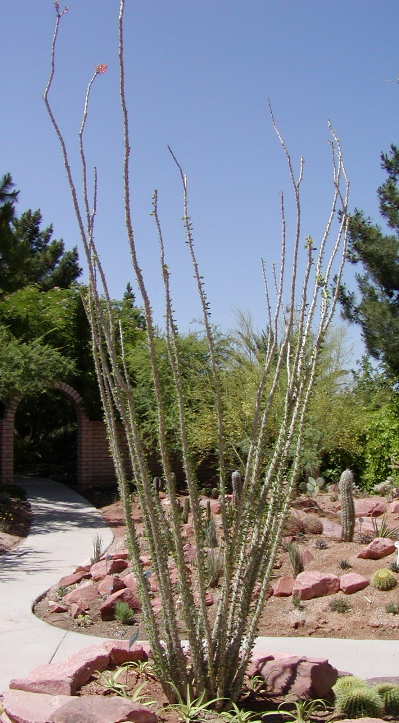
- Ocotillo (Fouquieria splendens)

Scientific classification
- Kingdom: Plantae
- Clade: Tracheophytes
- Clade: Angiosperms
- Clade: Eudicots
- Clade: Asterids
- Order: Ericales
- Family: Fouquieriaceae; DC.
- Genus: Fouquieria; Kunth

Type species
- Fouquieria formosa

Species
- See text

Synonyms
- Bronnia Kunth; Idria Kellogg; Philetaeria Liebm.

= Fouquieria =

Genus of flowering plants

Fouquieria is a genus of 11 species of desert flowering plants, the sole genus in the family Fouquieriaceae. The genus is native to North America and includes the ocotillo (F. splendens) and the Boojum tree or cirio (F. columnaris). They have semi succulent stems with thinner spikes projecting from them, with leaves on the bases of the spikes. They are unrelated to cacti and do not look much like them; their stems are proportionately thinner than cactus stems and their leaves are larger.

== Taxonomy ==
=== Taxonomic history ===
Fouquieria species do not have a particularly close resemblance to any other sort of plants; genetic evidence has shown they belong in the Ericales. Before this, they had been variously placed in the Violales or their own order, Fouquieriales.

The Seri people identify three species of Fouquieria in their area of Mexico: jomjéeziz or xomjéeziz (F. splendens), jomjéeziz caacöl (F. diguetii, Baja California tree ocotillo), and cototaj (F. columnaris, boojum).

=== Etymology ===
The genus is named after French physician Pierre Fouquier (1776-1850).

== Ecology ==
Fouquieria shrevei is endemic to the Cuatro Ciénegas Basin in Mexico, and is unusual in possessing vertical resinous wax bands on the stems, and exhibits gypsophily, the ability to grow on soils with a high concentration of gypsum. It has aromatic white flowers and is presumed to be moth-pollinated. Other species in the genus with orange or red flowers are pollinated by hummingbirds or carpenter bees. Fouquieria diguetii is host to a peacock mite, Tuckerella eloisae.

The spines of Fouquieria develop in an unusual way, from a woody thickening on the outer (lower) side of the leaf petiole, which remains after the leaf blade and most of the petiole separate and fall from the plant.

== Distribution and habitat ==
These plants are native to northern Mexico and the bordering US states of Arizona, southern California, New Mexico, and parts of southwestern Texas, favoring low, arid hillsides.

== Species ==
As of March 2025, the following species are accepted:

Image	Scientific name	Distribution
	Fouquieria burragei Rose – gulf ocotillo	Mexico (E. Baja California Sur)
	Fouquieria columnaris (Kellogg) Kellogg ex Curran – boojum tree	Mexico (C. Baja California, NW. Sonora)
	Fouquieria diguetii (Tiegh.) I.M.Johnst. – Adam's tree	Mexico (Baja California, CW. Sonora)
	Fouquieria fasciculata Nash	Mexico (S. Hidalgo)
	Fouquieria formosa Kunth	Mexico (Chiapas, Oaxaca, Guerrero, Puebla, Morelos, Michoacán, México State, Distrito Federal, Jalisco)
	Fouquieria leonilae Miranda	Mexico (C. Guerrero)
	Fouquieria macdougallii Nash	Mexico (Sonora, Sinaloa, W. Chihuahua)
	Fouquieria ochoterenae Miranda	Mexico (SW. Puebla, NW. Oaxaca)
	Fouquieria purpusii Brandegee	Mexico (S. Puebla, N. Oaxaca)
	Fouquieria shrevei I.M.Johnst.	Mexico (W. Coahuila)
	Fouquieria splendens Engelm. – ocotillo	United States (southern California, southern Nevada, Arizona, New Mexico, Texas), and northern Mexico (as far south as Hidalgo and Guerrero).
