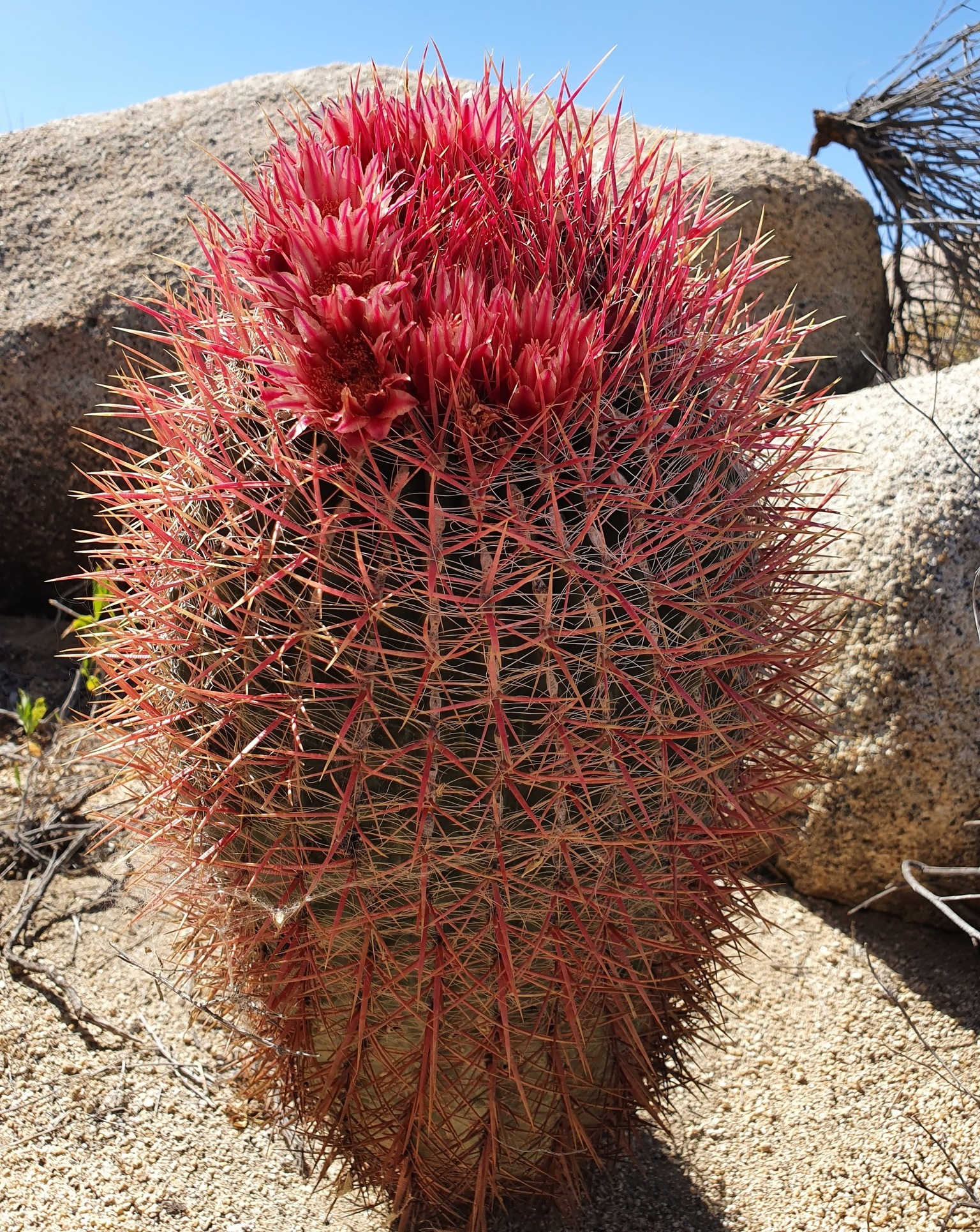

Conservation status
- Least Concern (IUCN 3.1)

Scientific classification
- Kingdom: Plantae
- Clade: Embryophytes
- Clade: Tracheophytes
- Clade: Spermatophytes
- Clade: Angiosperms
- Clade: Eudicots
- Order: Caryophyllales
- Family: Cactaceae
- Subfamily: Cactoideae
- Genus: Ferocactus
- Species: F. gracilis

Binomial name
- Ferocactus gracilis H.E.Gates

Synonyms
- Ferocactus peninsulae var. gracilis (H.E.Gates) G.Unger 1992

= Ferocactus gracilis =

Species of cactus

Ferocactus gracilis, the fire barrel cactus, is a species of Ferocactus from Northwestern Mexico. This cactus gets its common name from the striking red coloration of its defensive spines and flowers.

== Description ==
Ferocactus gracilis is a solitary cactus that grows up to 3 meters tall, with cylindrical or spherical stems reaching heights of up to 150 cm (59 in) and diameters of 30 cm (12 in). It has deep green stems with 16 to 24 slightly tuberculated ribs. The areoles are light gray bearing 7 to 13 central spines that are red, flattened, and up to 7 cm (2.8 in) long, with a slightly curved to hook-shaped yellow tip. Additionally, there are eight to twelve white radial spines, occasionally twisted and around 6 cm (2.4 in) long.

The plant blooms in spring to early summer, producing funnel-shaped flowers with a purple-red midvein and red, yellow to white margins, reaching lengths of up to 4 cm (1.6 in) and diameters of 3.5 cm (1.4 in). The elongated yellow fruits are about 2.5 cm (0.98 in) long and do not open at a basal pore. The seeds are round, black, shiny, and measure 1.7-2 mm (0.079 in) long and 1.1-1.3 mm (0.051 in) wide.

== Subspecies ==
There are four accepted subspecies:

Image	Scientific name	Distribution
	Ferocactus gracilis subsp. coloratus (H.E.Gates) N.P.Taylor	Mexico (C. Baja California)
	Ferocactus gracilis subsp. gatesii (G.E.Linds.) N.P.Taylor	Mexico (Baja California: Islands in Los Angeles Bay)
	Ferocactus gracilis subsp. gracilis	Mexico (C. Baja California)
	Ferocactus gracilis subsp. tortulispinus (H.E.Gates) Lodé	Mexico (N. Central Baja California)

== Distribution ==
Ferocactus gracilis is native to southern Sierra San Pedro Martir, south to Punta Prieta, and northern Baja California, Mexico, growing at elevations of 10 to 30 meters. It thrives in rocky hillsides, outwash fans, silt flats, and gravelly plains, often alongside other desert plants like Mammillaria dioica, Cochemiea hutchisoniana, Echinocereus engelmannii, Pachycereus pringlei, Stenocereus thurberi, Fouquieria burragei, Cylindropuntia cholla, Idria columnaris, Lophocereus schottii, and Stenocereus gummosus.

== Taxonomy ==
This species was first described in 1933 by Howard Elliott Gates who named it after its slender growth habit.
