= Boojum forest =

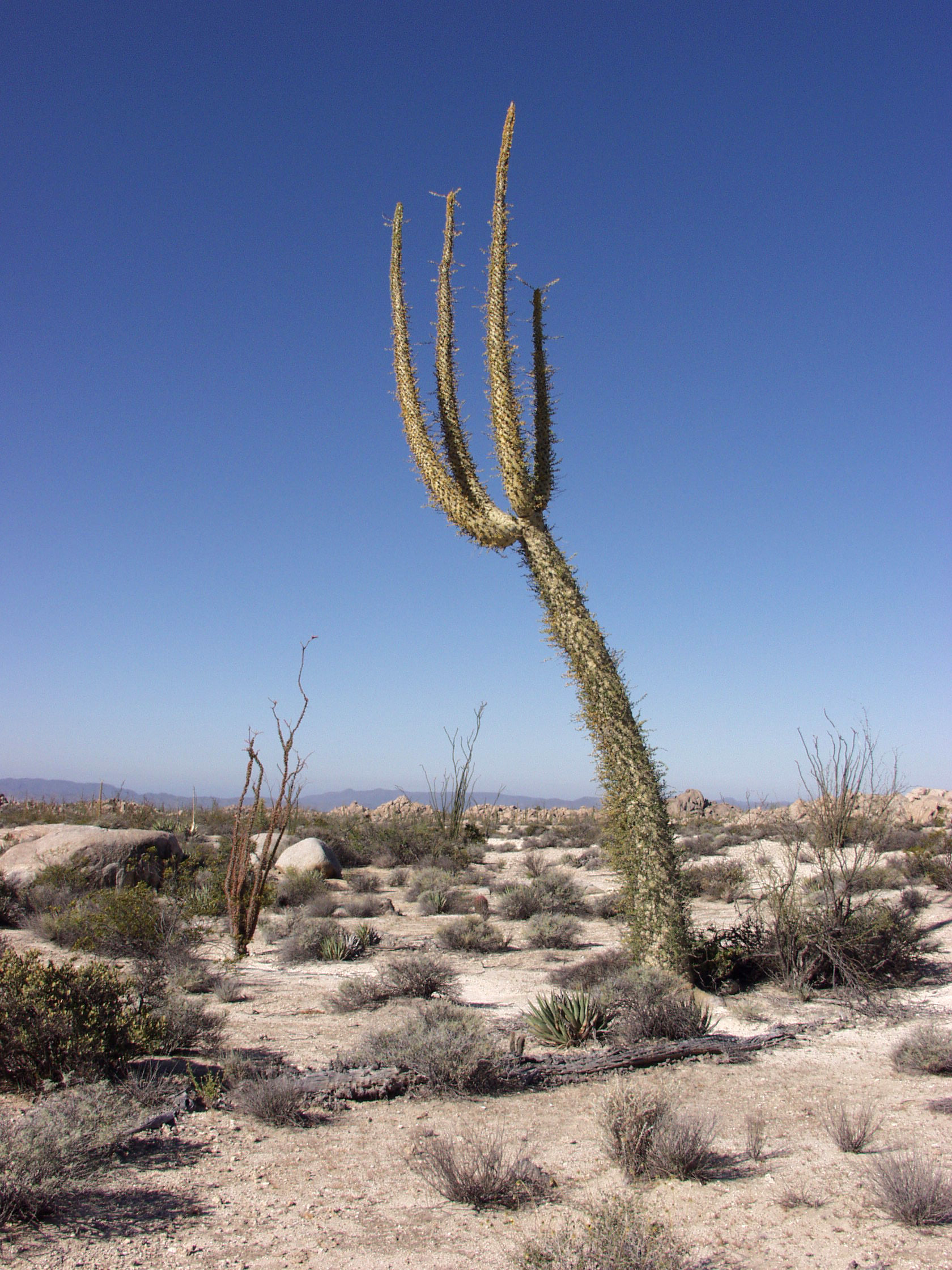
Boojum tree in hot June summers

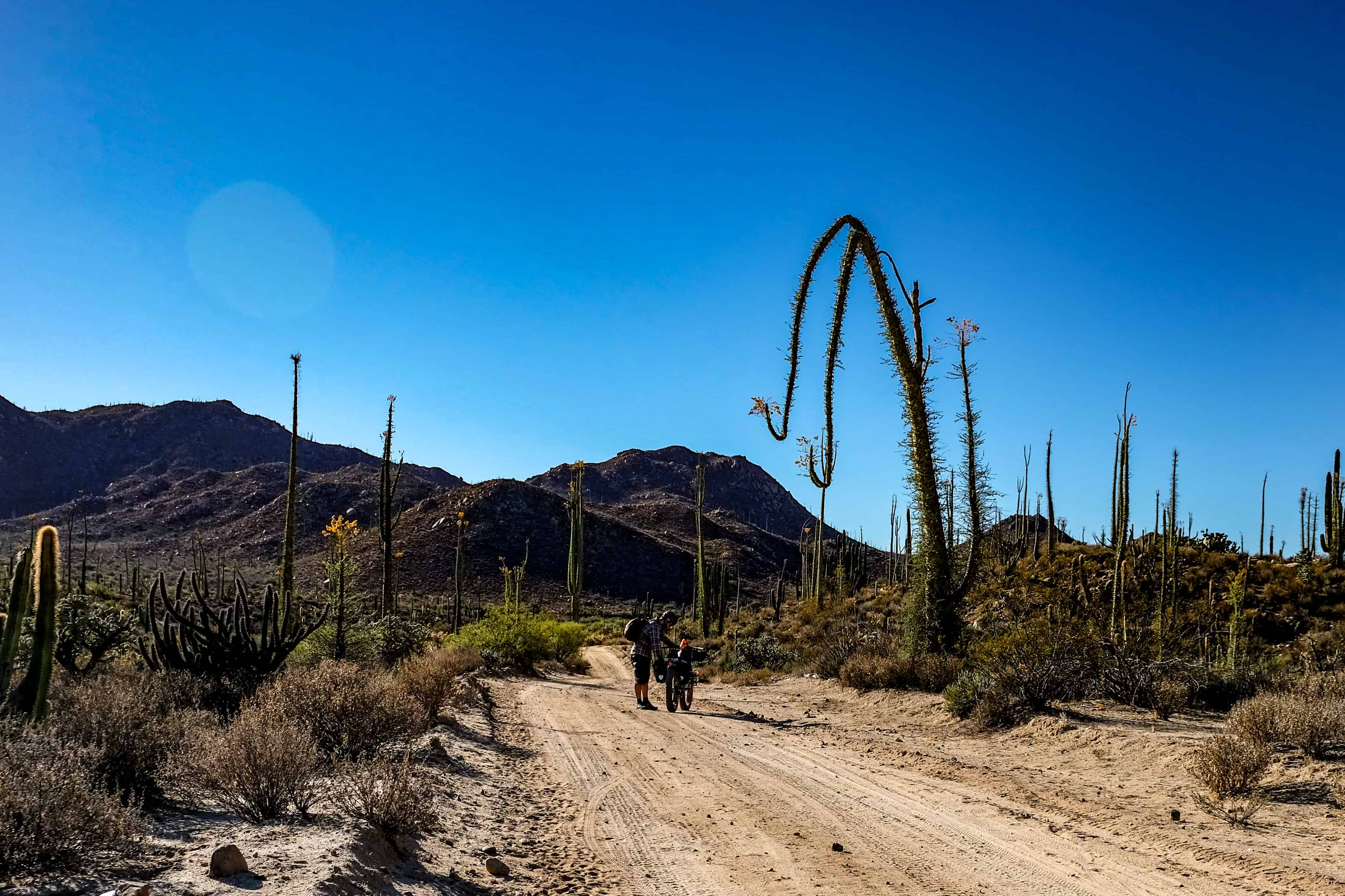
Cirio columnaris with human for scale

The Boojum forest is an area in central Baja California, Mexico, near Cataviña known for endemic flora so bizarre and grotesque in appearance that the area was named after mathematician/logician Lewis Carroll's imaginary landscape poem The Hunting of the Snark.

The area is characterized by almost no rainfall, as opposed to the two coasts of the Baja Peninsula, and exotic plants such as the Boojum tree (Fouquieria columnaris), which can grow up to 50 feet tall with an 18-inch diameter trunk. Large, rounded granitic boulders dot the landscape, as do cacti such as Ferocactus gracilis, huge fleshy "red blooded" elephant trees (Bursera microphylla), huge endemic ocotillo (Fouquieria peninsularis) with flaming-red-flowered tipped ends, and the world's largest cactus, the Mexican giant cardón (Pachycereus pringlei).

== Location ==
The forest is about 350 kilometres (220 mi) south of Tijuana along Highway 1 in Baja California, Mexico.
