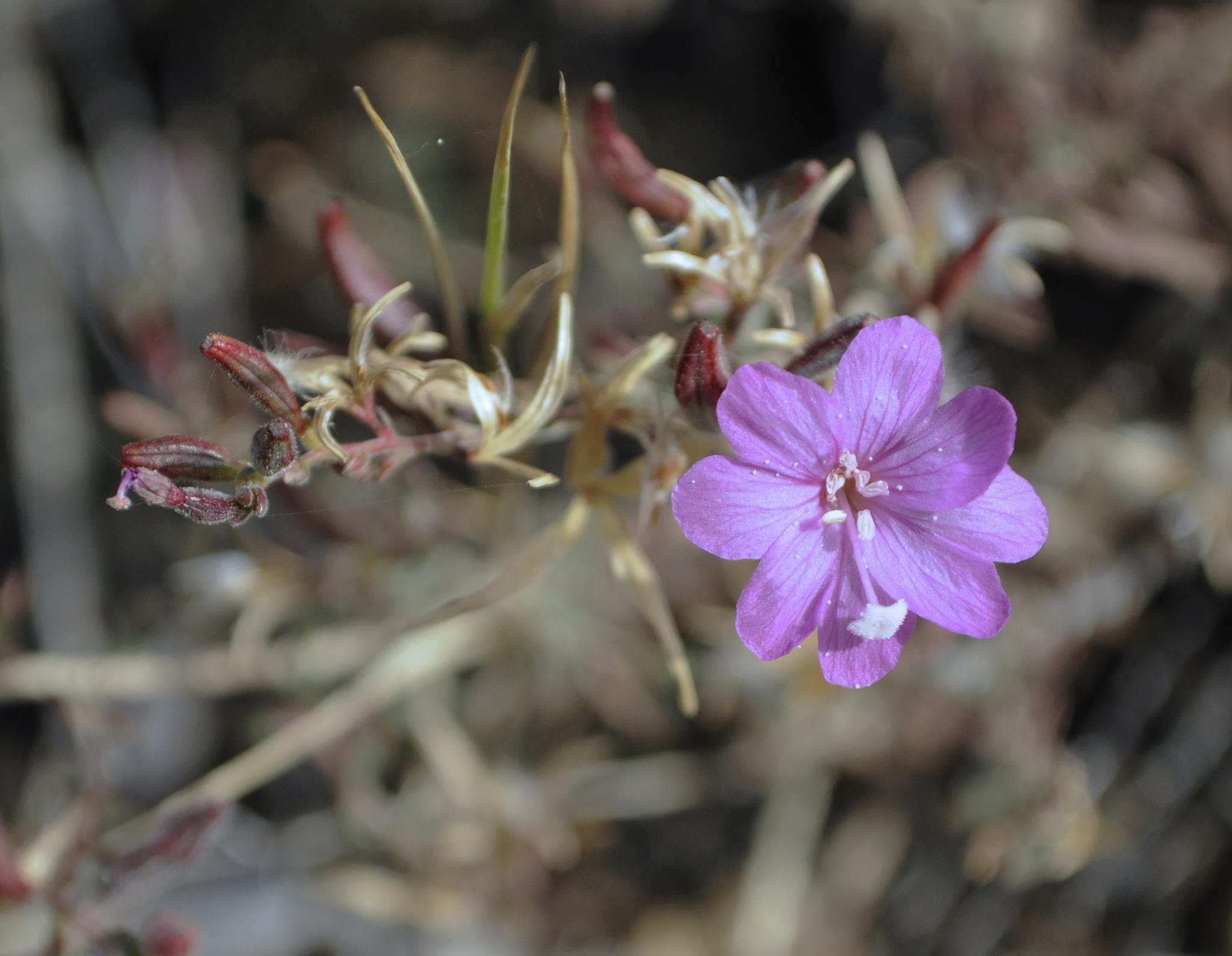

Conservation status
- Imperiled (NatureServe)

Scientific classification
- Kingdom: Plantae
- Clade: Tracheophytes
- Clade: Angiosperms
- Clade: Eudicots
- Clade: Rosids
- Order: Myrtales
- Family: Onagraceae
- Genus: Epilobium
- Species: E. nivium

Binomial name
- Epilobium nivium T.S. Brandegee, 1892

= Epilobium nivium =

Snow Mountain willowherb

Species of flowering plant in the willowherb family

Epilobium nivium, commonly known as the Snow Mountain willowherb, is a perennial subshrub endemic to the Coast Range Mountains of Northern California. It was originally described based upon a collection from Snow Mountain.

Although first described in 1892, as of 2019 the species is known from fewer than 20 small occurrences spread throughout high elevation sites across Colusa, Glenn, Lake, Mendocino, Tehama, and Trinity counties.

Epilobium nivium has a California Rare Plant Rank of 1B.2 (fairly endangered in California). The California Natural Diversity Database has assigned it a NatureServe rank of G2G3 (globally vulnerable or imperiled). The species is also included on the US Forest Service list of sensitive species.

The plant has bee-pollinated flowers and a growth form suggestive of a desert species.

Snow Mountain willowherb thrives under extremes. It grows in sites which alternate between hot, dry summer conditions and snow cover in winter.

Epilobium nivium grows in small, isolated colonies where it typically forms the dominant species in its microhabitat. This species is only known to grow from cracks in rock outcrops and associated talus where there is essentially no soil development. E. nivium is known to grow on mafic igneous rock, and it may be entirely restricted to such substrates.

The Snow Mountain area is composed of late Jurassic age undersea volcanoes which erupted from the ocean floor. Mountains in this area are composed chiefly from flows of finely crystalline basalt. These rocks are more resistant to erosion than surrounding rocks, which is why after later uplifting they remain as some of the highest peaks in the vicinity. Other rocks which eroded more quickly left the volcanoes exposed. Snow Mountain area shows signs of Pleistocene glaciation. These are the most southerly glacial features known in the Coast Ranges.

Epilobium nivium sites outside of the Snow Mountain Wilderness are typically mapped as mesozoic metavolcanic rocks or as portions of the Franciscan Complex, which is a mix of rock types including mesozoic sedimentary and metasedimentary rocks.

Geologic maps of the Castle Peak area show those rocks are mostly sedimentary, specifically radiolarian chert and metagraywacke. There are only a few reports of E. nivium near Castle Peak. It is unclear whether the species has been found there on sedimentary rock. However, there are occasional intrusions of diabase in this area, so E. nivium may be restricted to outcrops of mafic igneous rock on Castle Peak.

It seems likely that there are a number of undiscovered populations of Snow Mountain willowherb. Most of the known sites are near trails or roads. Much of the high-elevation rock outcrops within the known range are in wilderness areas with limited accessibility.

The nearest known relative of Snow Mountain willowherb is Nevada willowherb (Epilobium nevadense), which has a similar appearance and grows in similar habitats. These two species together form Epilobium sect. Cordylophorurn subsect. Petrolobium and have been shown to form infertile hybrids in cultivation.
