= Epilobium nevadense =

Nevada willowherb

Conservation status
- Vulnerable (NatureServe)

Scientific classification
- Kingdom: Plantae
- Clade: Embryophytes
- Clade: Tracheophytes
- Clade: Spermatophytes
- Clade: Angiosperms
- Clade: Eudicots
- Clade: Rosids
- Order: Myrtales
- Family: Onagraceae
- Genus: Epilobium
- Species: E. nevadense

Binomial name
- Epilobium nevadense Munz, 1929

Species of flowering plant in the willowherb family

Epilobium nevadense is a rare and vulnerable species of flowering plant in the willowherb family Onagraceae. It is known from a few scattered populations in mountain ranges in Nevada, Utah, and northwestern Arizona. It grows on talus slopes composed of either volcanic or limestone origin at feet 5,200–9,000 feet (1,600–2,700 m) in elevation.

The nearest known relative of Nevada willowherb is Snow Mountain willowherb (Epilobium nivium), which has a similar appearance and grows in similar habitats. These two species together form Epilobium sect. Cordylophorurn subsect. Petrolobium and have been shown to form infertile hybrids in cultivation.
