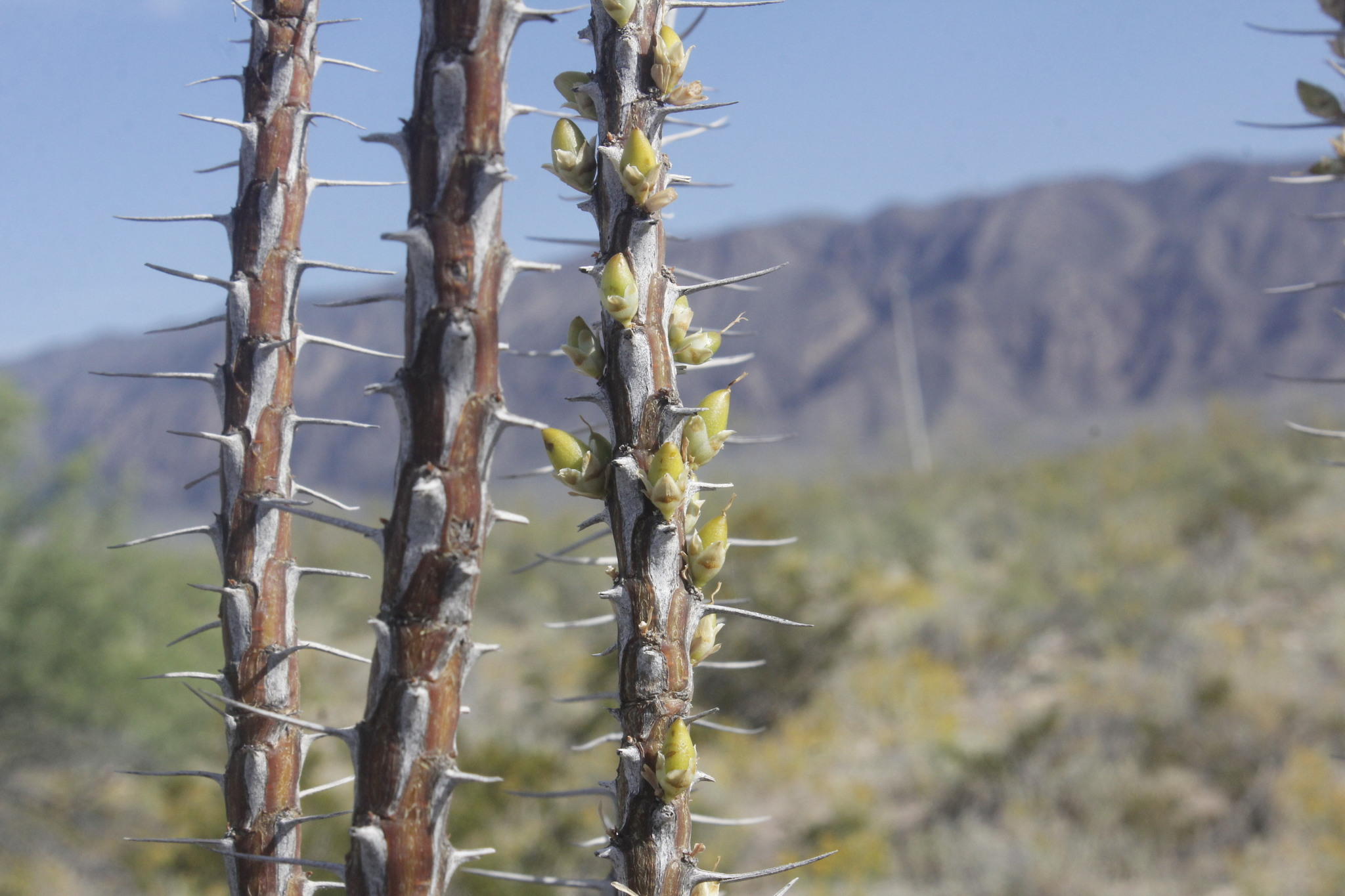

Scientific classification
- Kingdom: Plantae
- Clade: Tracheophytes
- Clade: Angiosperms
- Clade: Eudicots
- Clade: Asterids
- Order: Ericales
- Family: Fouquieriaceae
- Genus: Fouquieria
- Species: F. shrevei

Binomial name
- Fouquieria shrevei I.M.Johnst.

= Fouquieria shrevei =

Species of flowering plant

Fouquieria shrevei is a plant species native to the States of Coahuila and Durango states of northeastern Mexico. It is simply referred to as an ocotillo. It is endemic to some scattered gypsum outcroppings in the Bolsón de Mapimí, where the low rainfall, hot climate and gypseous soil work to create a restrictive environment. It has flowers with short, white corollas that distinguish it from the nearby Fouquieria splendens.

== Description ==
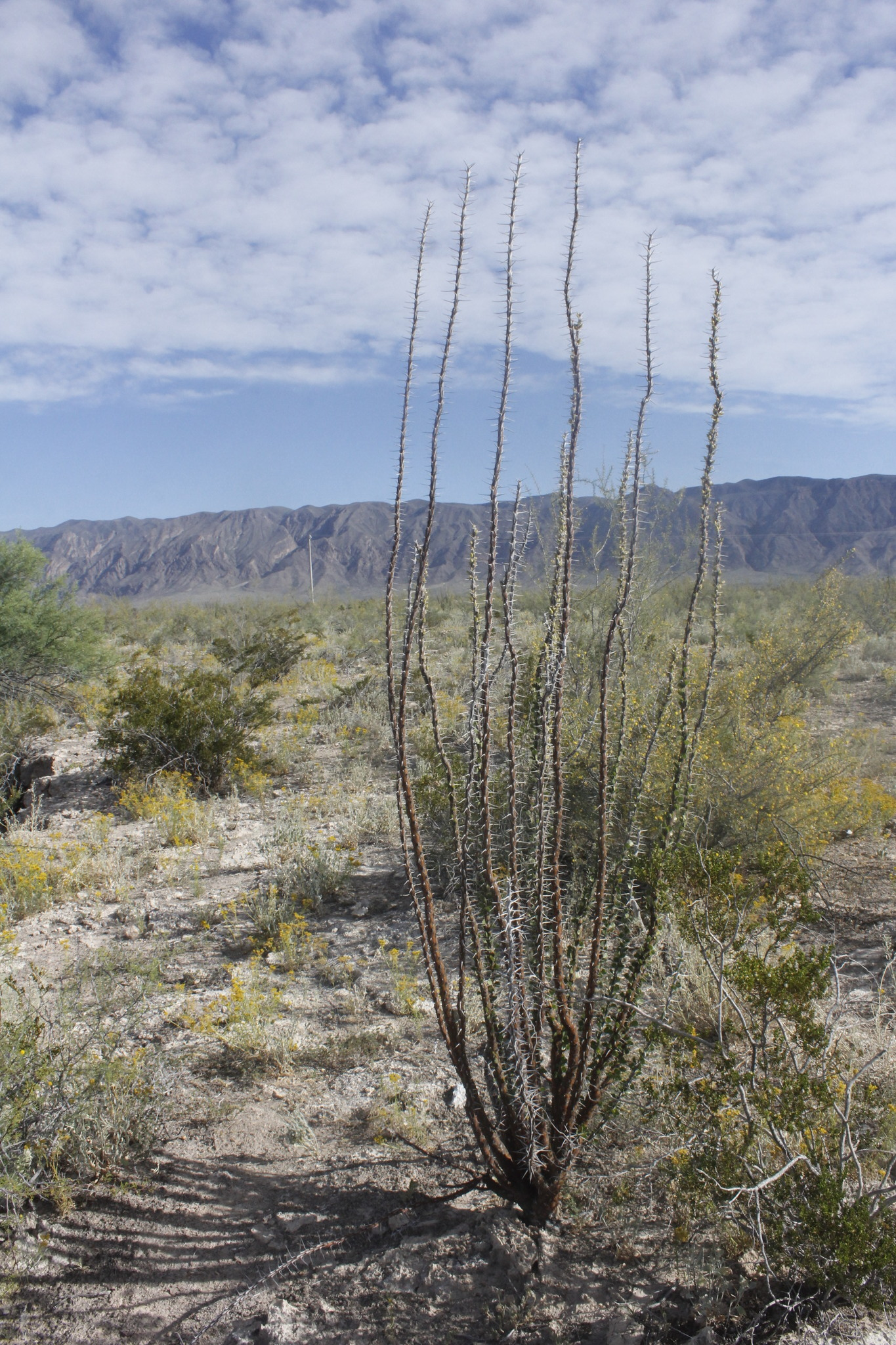
In habitat

Fouquieria shrevei is a shrub up to 3 m (9.8 ft) tall, branching repeatedly near the base but hardly at all above. Leaves are ovate to oblanceolate, up to 3 cm (1 in) long and 2.5 cm (0.98 in) wide, with scarious (thin, dry and brown) margins.

Flowers are white, born in short racemes in the axils of the leaves. The board leaves plus the axillary racemes of white flowers make this a distinctive and unusual member of the genus.

=== Etymology ===
Because this species occurs sympatric with Fouquieria splendens, the plant is not distinguished and is simply referred to as an "ocotillo" by the local people. The specific epithet is named after Forrest Shreve, a desert ecologist who accompanied I. M. Johnston when he discovered the species.

== Distribution and habitat ==
It can be found in the Cuatro Ciénegas Basin in Coahuila, approximately 50 km (about 31 miles) west of Monclova, at an elevation of about 740 meters (2,430 feet). There are several natural springs in the region, allowing an estimated 150 species of endemic plants and animals to survive in this desert oasis. The species has also been reported from other sites in the same state plus one locale in the neighboring State of Durango.
