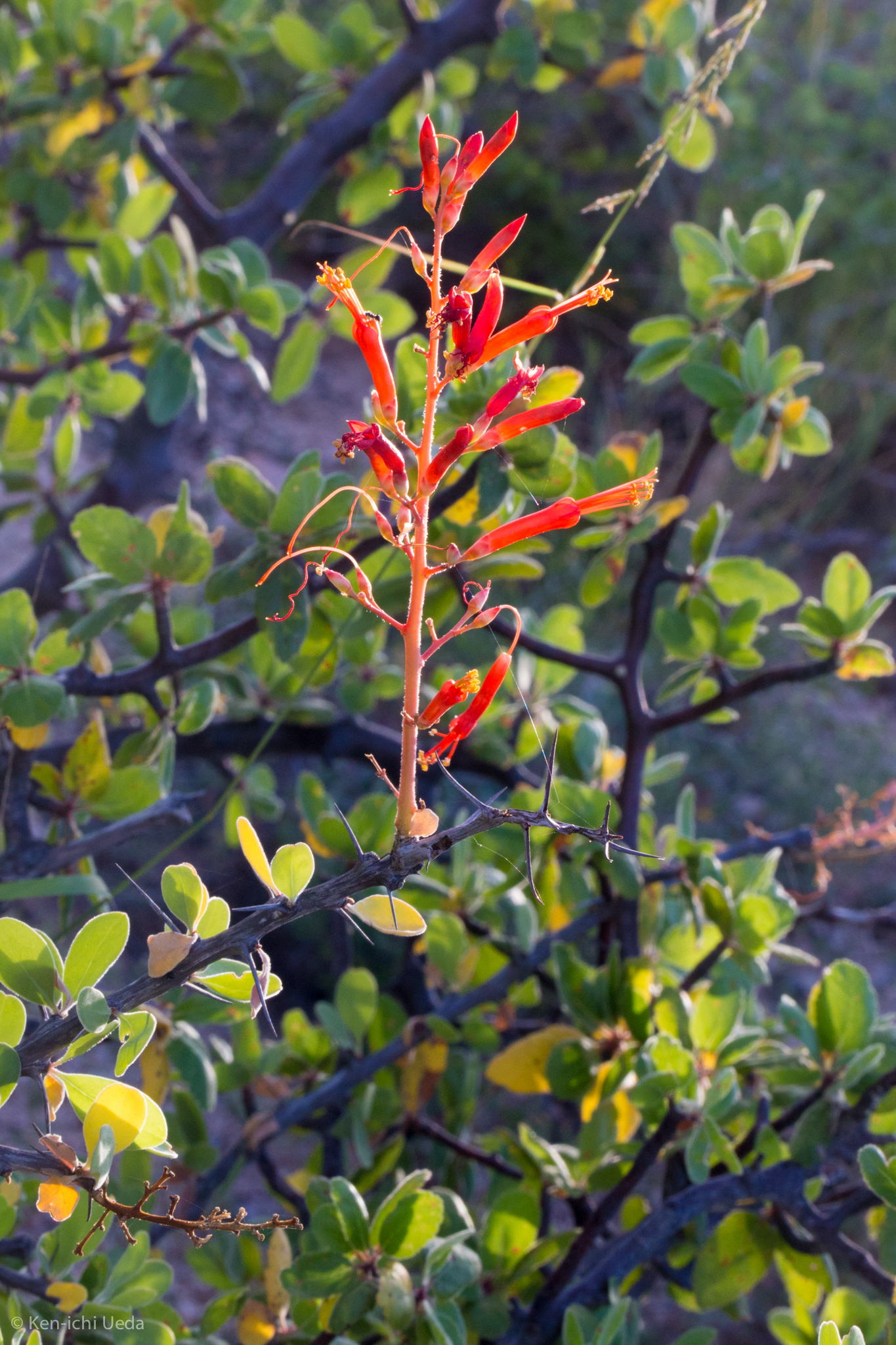

Conservation status
- Vulnerable (IUCN 3.1)

Scientific classification
- Kingdom: Plantae
- Clade: Embryophytes
- Clade: Tracheophytes
- Clade: Angiosperms
- Clade: Eudicots
- Clade: Asterids
- Order: Ericales
- Family: Fouquieriaceae
- Genus: Fouquieria
- Species: F. diguetii

Binomial name
- Fouquieria diguetii (Van Tieghem) I.M. Johnst.

Synonyms
- Bronnia digueti Tiegh.; Bronnia thiebauti Tiegh.; Fouquieria peninsularis Nash

= Fouquieria diguetii =

Species of plant

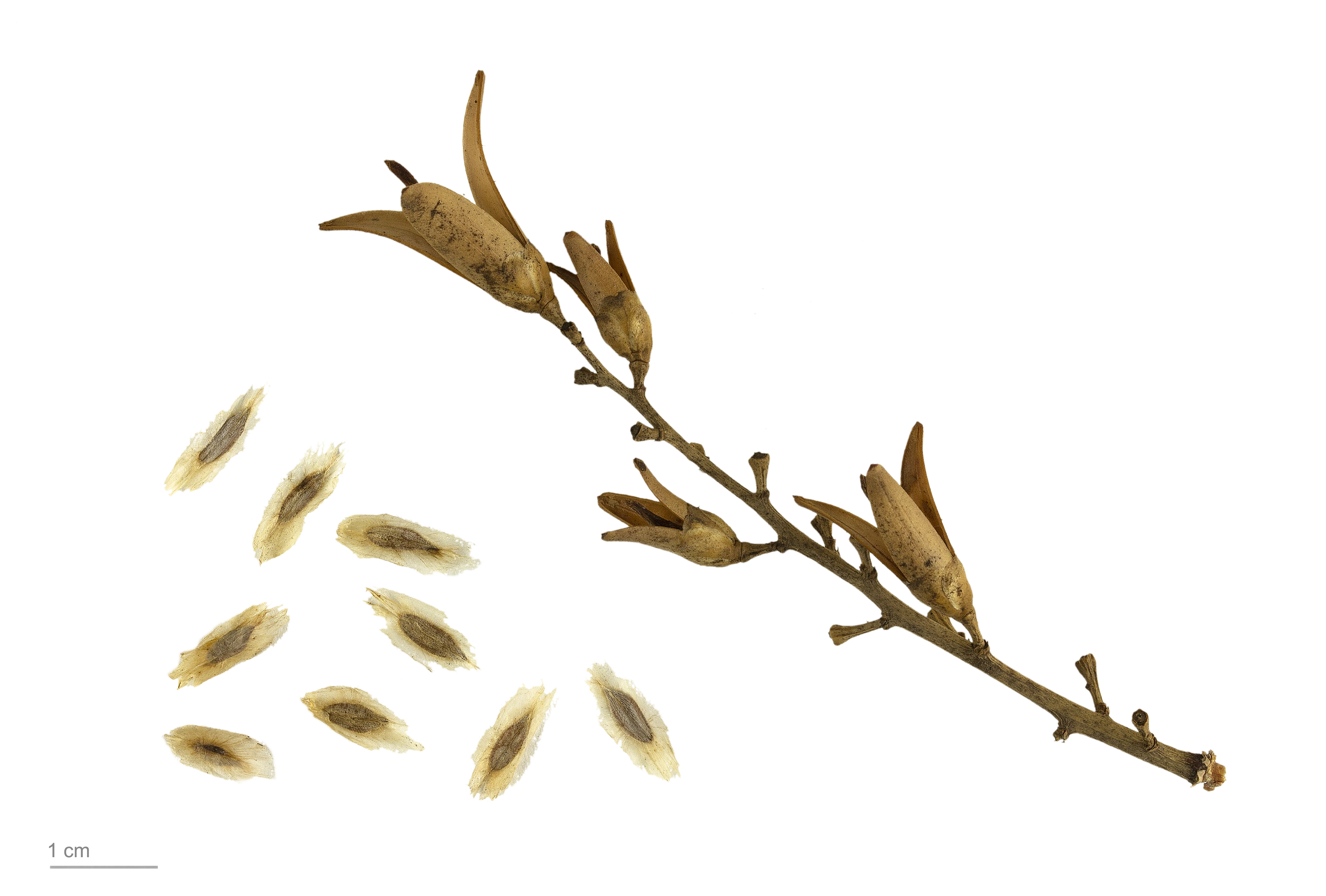
Fouquieria diguetii MHNT

Fouquieria diguetii, known by the common names Adam's tree, palo Adán, and Baja California tree ocotillo, is a plant in the family Fouquieriaceae native to the southern half of the Baja California Peninsula, and the coasts of Sonora and Sinaloa. It is a semi-succulent and deciduous plant related to the ocotillo and the Boojum tree. It is distinguished by its bright red, tubular flowers, a shrub to small tree habit, and conical, paniculate inflorescences.

== Description ==
=== Morphology ===
This plant is a deciduous shrub arising from a short, thick trunk with branches covered in spines. It grows between 1.8 and 3 meters tall. The leaves are dark green and elliptic, and can be up to 2 cm long. The flowers are bright red in color, and attract hummingbirds.

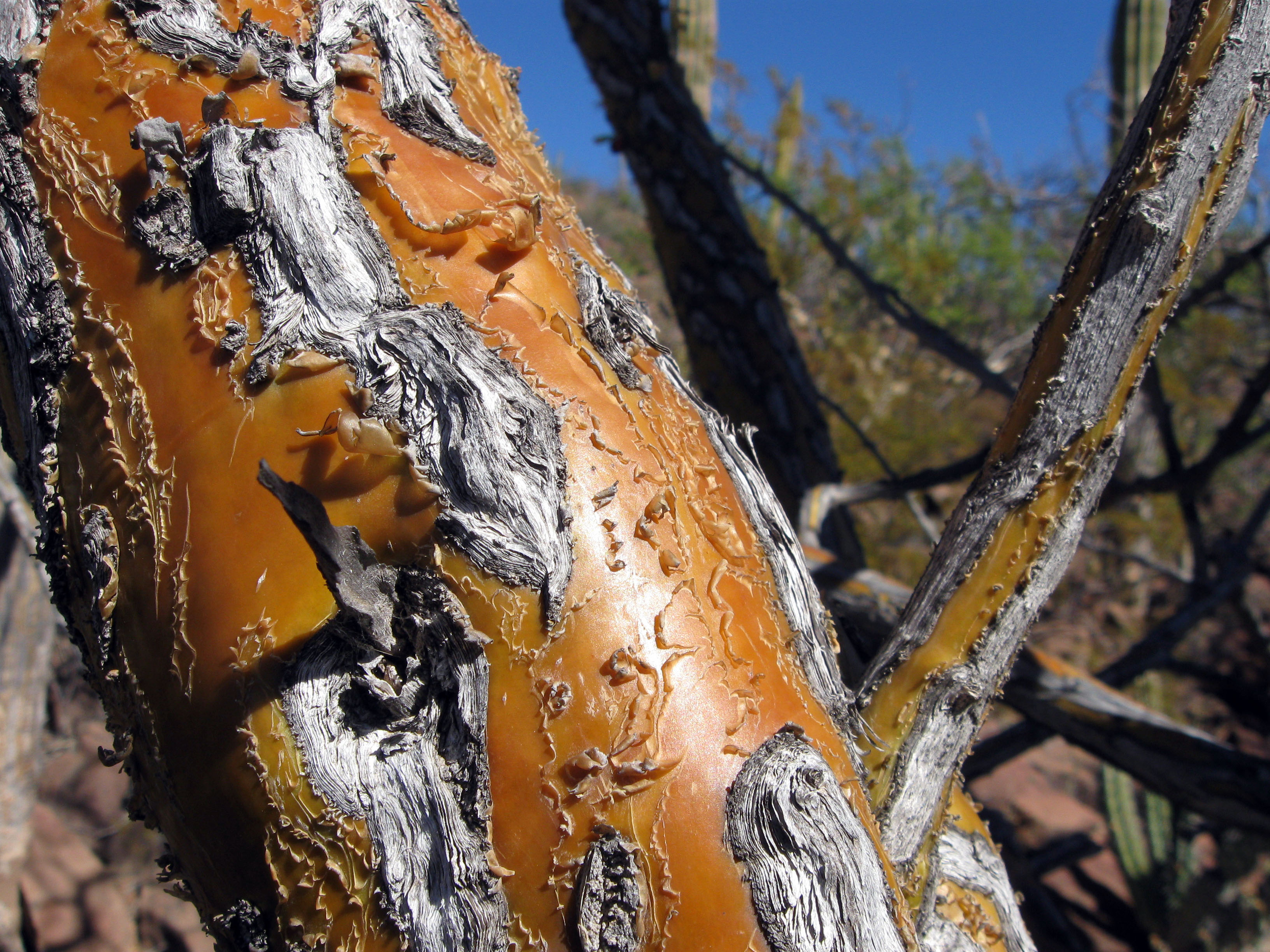
Detail of the trunk

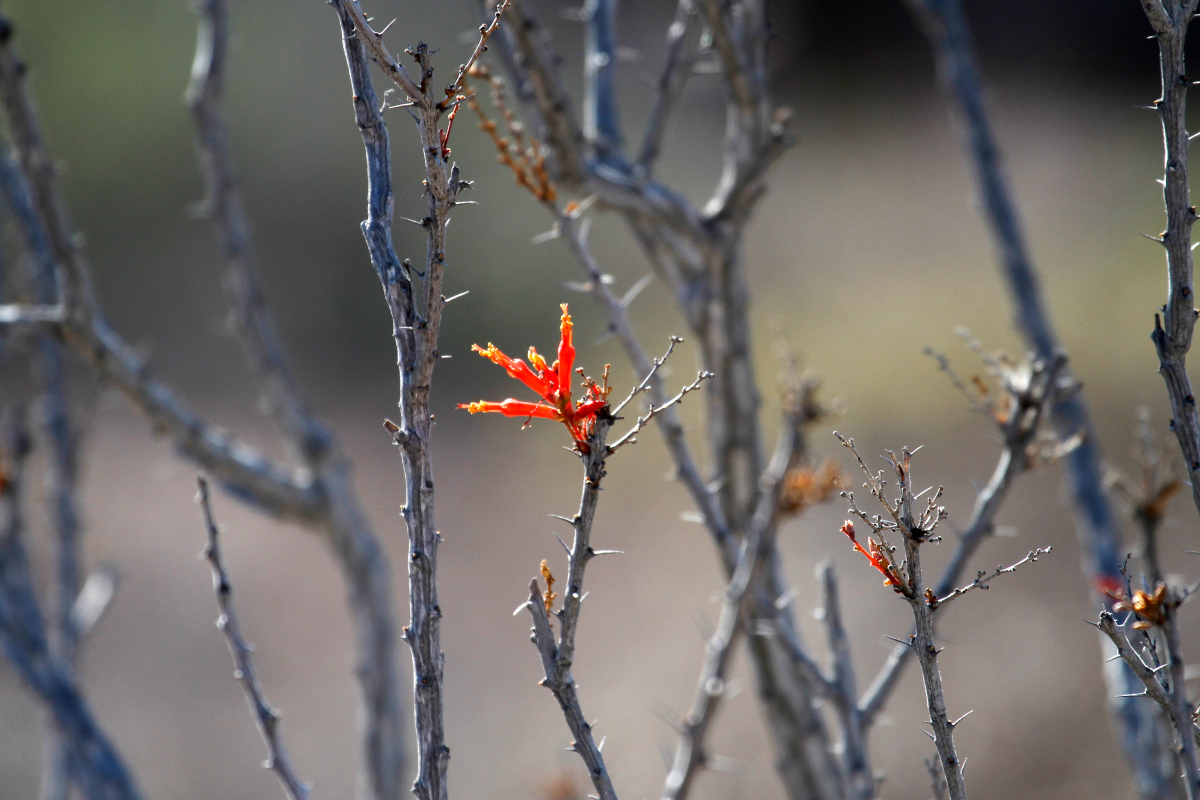
Flowering among deciduous stems

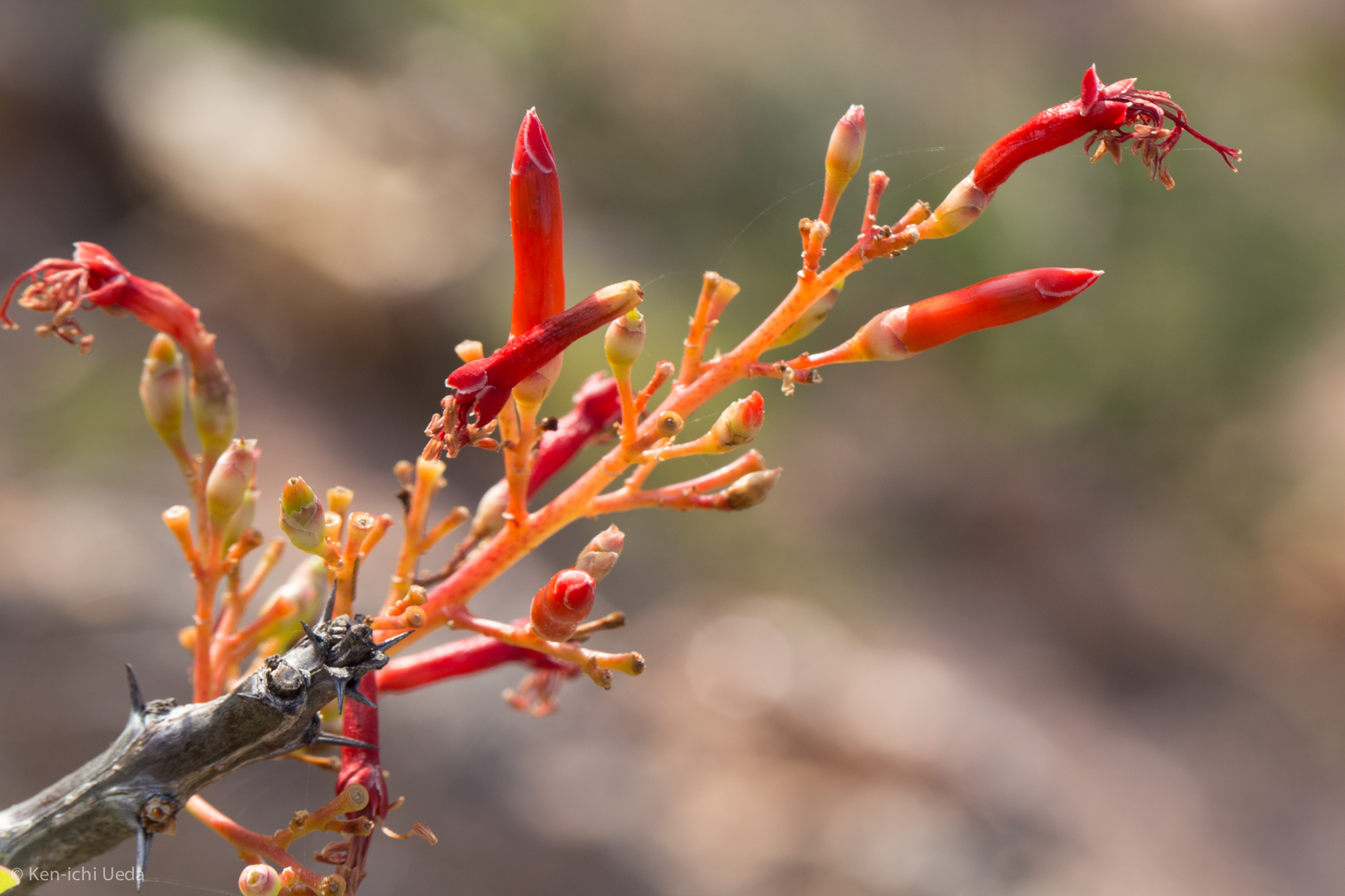
Detail of inflorescence

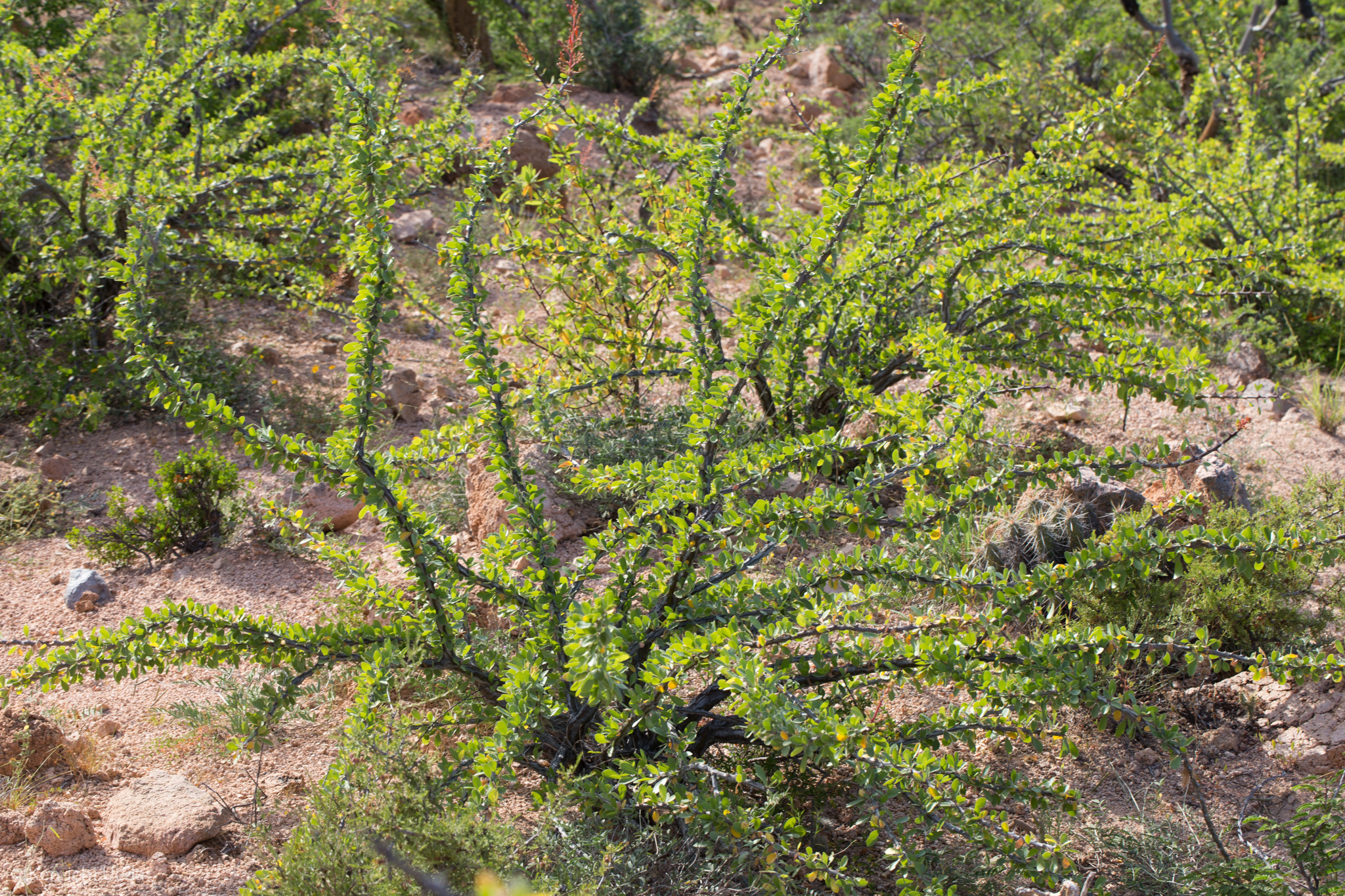
Plants with leaves

== Taxonomy ==
The chromosome number is 2n = 48.

=== Taxonomic history ===
This species was described in 1899 by Philippe Van Tieghem as Bronnia digueti and as Bronnia thiebauti. George Valentine Nash described this plant as Fouquieria peninsularis. In 1925, Ivan M. Johnston combined all of these names under the current one, Fouquieria diguetii. However, it is written in his description as F. digueti.

=== Etymology ===
This species is named for Leon Diguet, a French naturalist who traveled throughout Baja California.

== Distribution and habitat ==
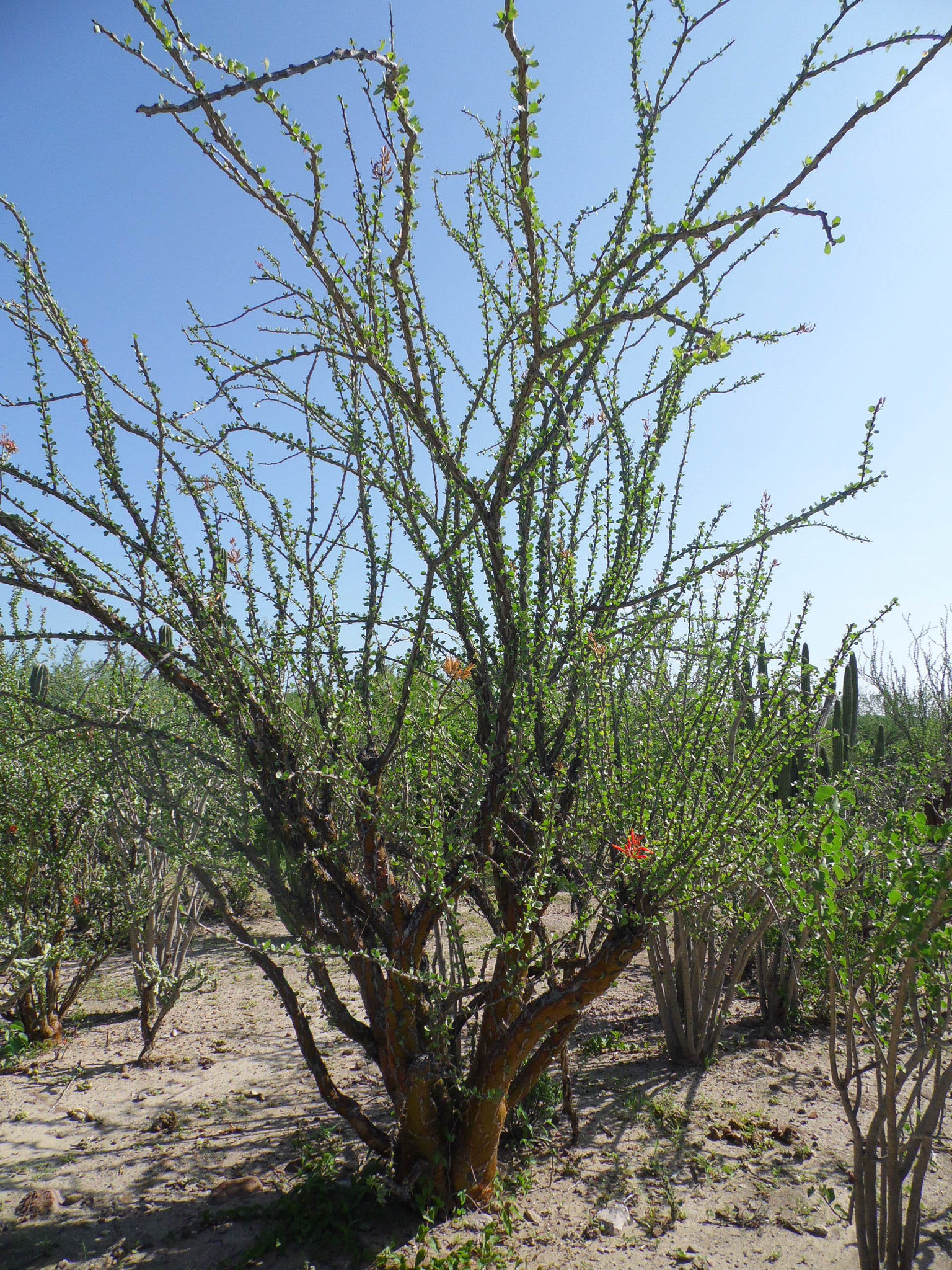
Growing in habitat

This plant may be found from the vicinity of El Crucero in southern Baja California into the cape of the Baja California Sur, and on the surrounding islands in the gulf, and the Santa Margarita and Magdalena Islands on the Pacific coast. It is also found on some parts of the coast of Sonora and Sinaloa, facing the Gulf of California.

This species is common throughout its range. On Montserrat Island in the Gulf of California, it can be found on marine terraces and escarpments.

== Phenology and biology ==
There is a considerable amount of variation in the growth habit and inflorescence length over the distribution of this species. Plants in the Sonoran Desert typically only reach 1 to 3 meters in height at maturity, while mature plants in the southern tropical region may commonly exceed 4 meters in height. The length of the inflorescence is dependent on the moisture available at the time of development, meaning plants in the arid part of the range have inflorescences that average 5.1 cm in length, while in the tropical parts of the range the inflorescence may average 11.5 cm in length. Inflorescences produced in the dry season tend to be much shorter than those produced in the wet seasons.

Pollination is primarily from hummingbirds, who are attracted to the long, red, tubular flowers.
