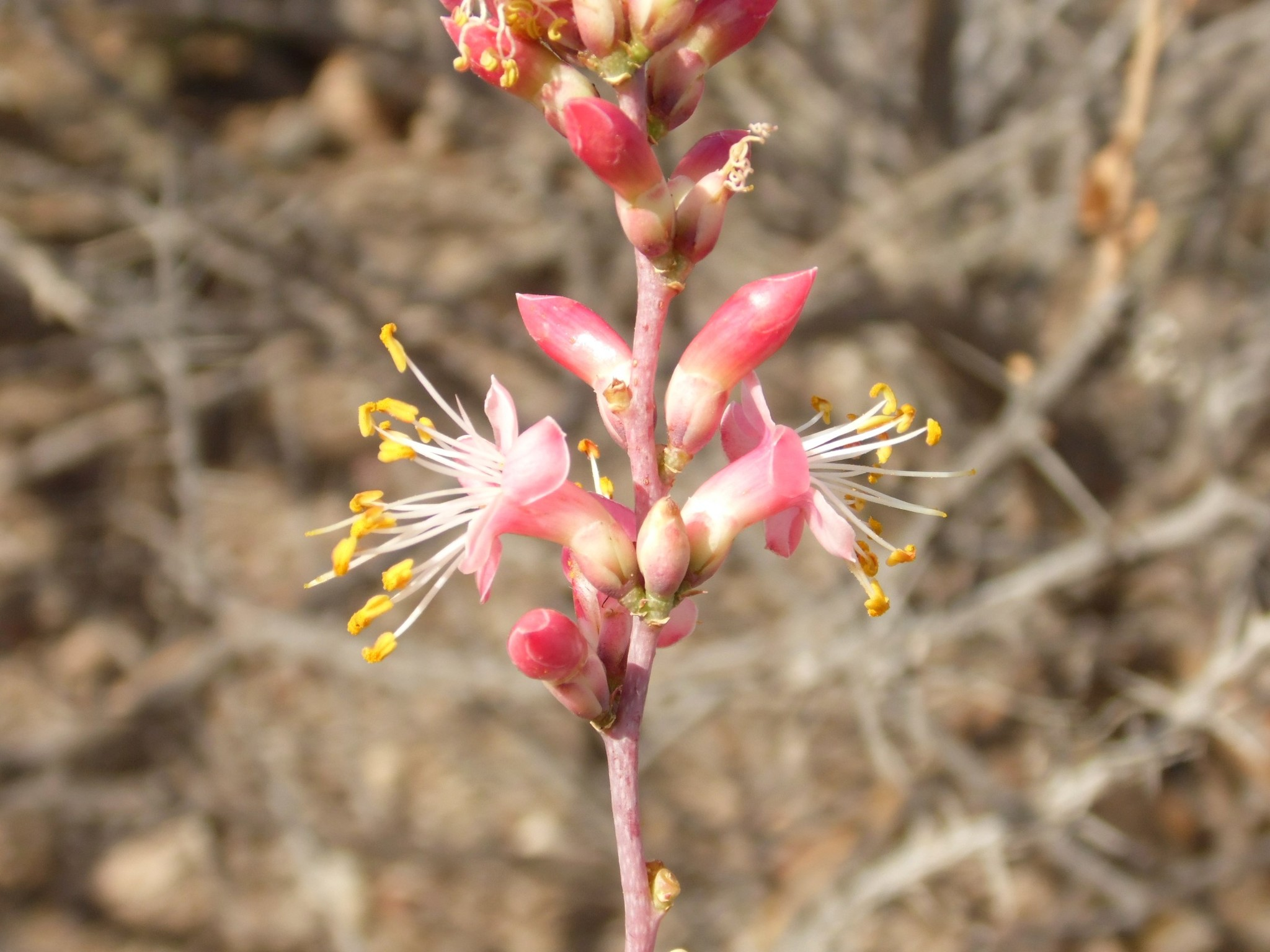

Conservation status
- Endangered (IUCN 3.1)

Scientific classification
- Kingdom: Plantae
- Clade: Tracheophytes
- Clade: Angiosperms
- Clade: Eudicots
- Clade: Asterids
- Order: Ericales
- Family: Fouquieriaceae
- Genus: Fouquieria
- Species: F. burragei

Binomial name
- Fouquieria burragei Rose

= Fouquieria burragei =

Species of flowering plant

Fouquieria burragei, known commonly as the gulf ocotillo or pichilingue, is a species of perennial plant in the genus Fouquieria (referred to as ocotillos), native to the gulf coast of Baja California Sur. It is a shrub to small tree distinguished by its white to rose-red flowers, which are unique among the ocotillo species on the peninsula. It is the only ocotillo endemic to the peninsula, and is threatened by invasive species (particularly feral goats), tourism, coastal development and other human activities.

== Description ==
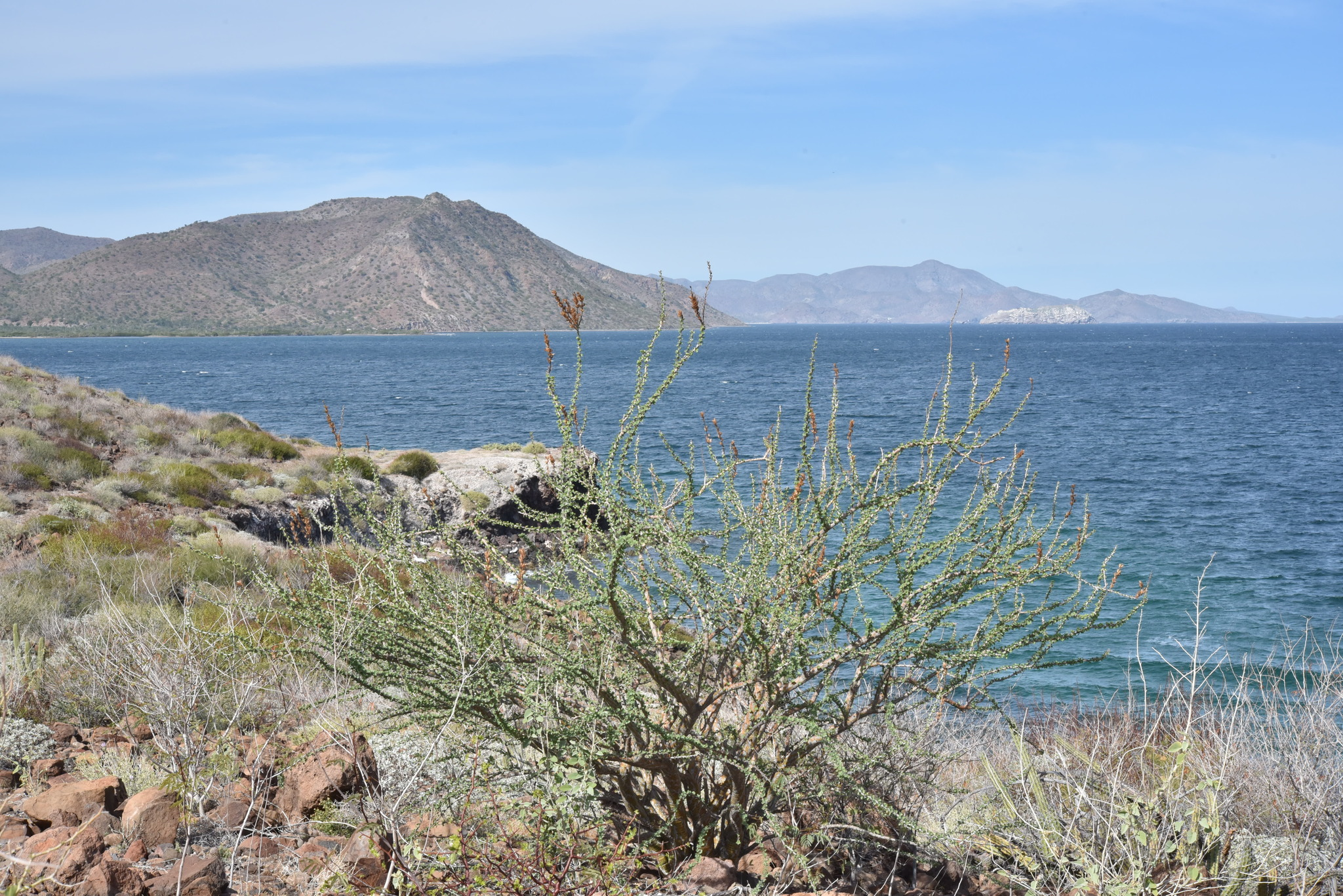
Growing in view of the ocean

This plant is a shrub to small tree 3 to 7 meters in height. It consists of thin, thorny branches sprawling upwards from a central base, which gives the plant a fan-shaped appearance. The bright-green leaves are small, oval and emerge in pairs alternating between the thorns. After rains, flowers begin to emerge. The inflorescence is variable, shaped elongate, narrow, and upright, and emerges from just above the base of older inflorescences. The distinctive flowers have a short, white to rose-red corolla, with numerous long, exerted stamens.

== Taxonomy ==
The type specimen was collected from Pichilinque Island, and the species was described by Joseph Nelson Rose in 1911. It is very similar in vegetative form to Fouquieria diguettii, but both are easily distinguished by F. burragei's white to pink flowers. F. burragei has a chromosome number of 2n = 72, as opposed to 2n = 48 for F. diguettii, which may suggest that F. burragei is a possible hybrid species with F. diguettii and a now extinct white-flowered diploid species.

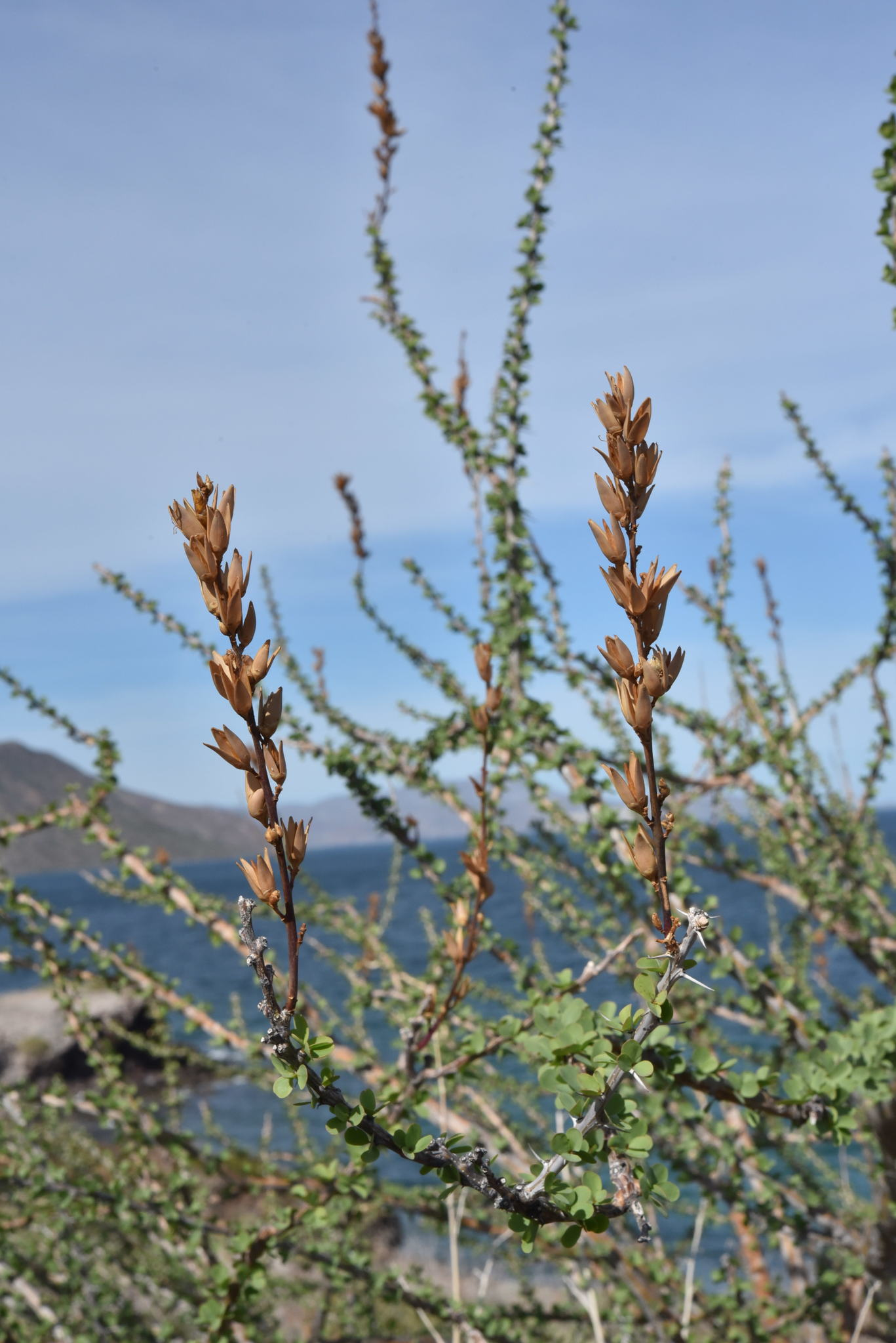
With old inflorescences

== Distribution and habitat ==
This species is distributed from Bahía Concepción south to the vicinity of La Paz and on Espiritu Santo Island in Baja California Sur. The populations of this plant are widely scattered, and gene flow between isolated populations is likely non-existent. It is found on rocky slopes with shallow sandy to volcanic clay soils, up to 200 meters in elevation.
