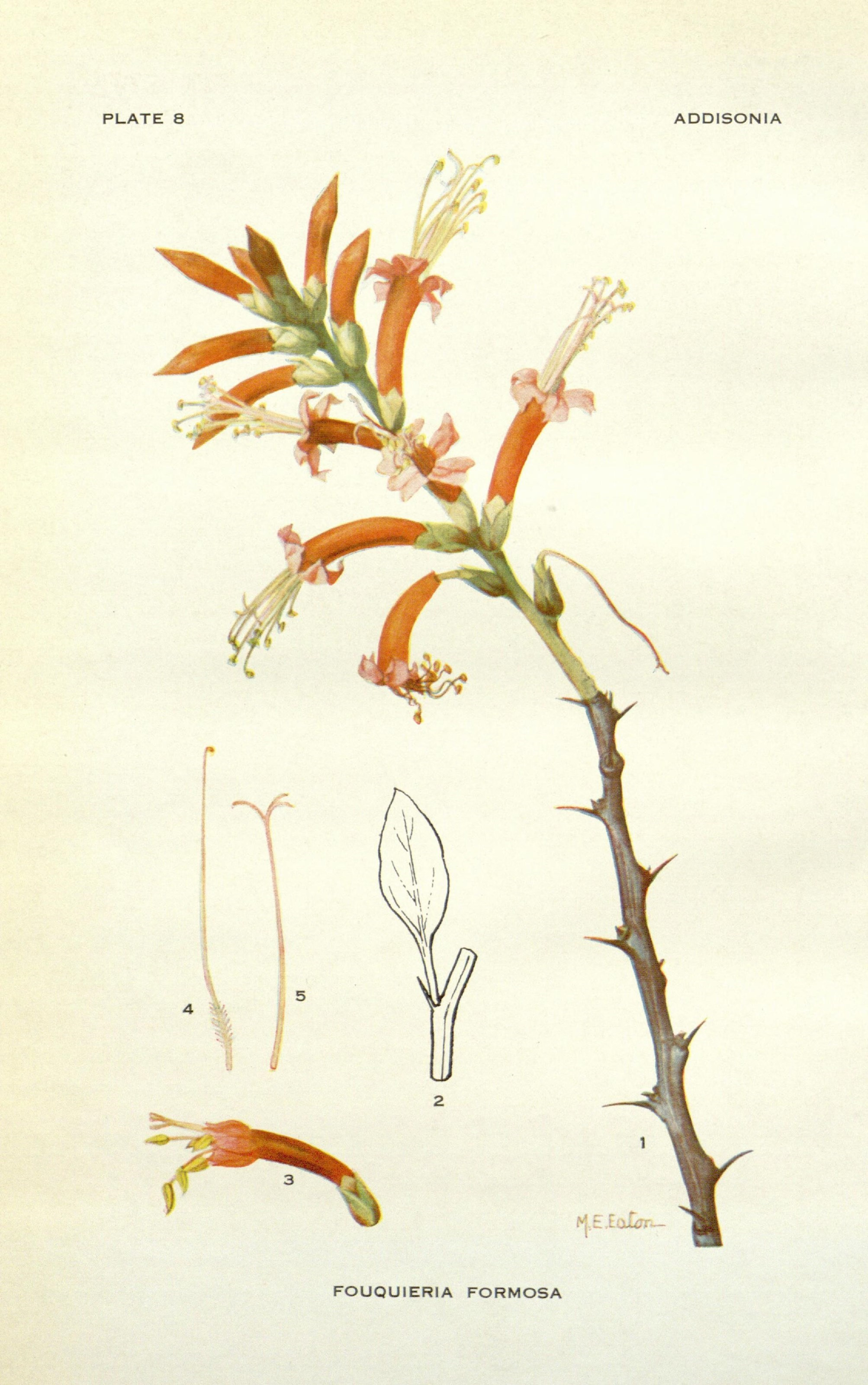

Conservation status
- Least Concern (IUCN 3.1)

Scientific classification
- Kingdom: Plantae
- Clade: Tracheophytes
- Clade: Angiosperms
- Clade: Eudicots
- Clade: Asterids
- Order: Ericales
- Family: Fouquieriaceae
- Genus: Fouquieria
- Species: F. formosa

Binomial name
- Fouquieria formosa Kunth

= Fouquieria formosa =

Species of flowering plant

Fouquieria formosa is a species of perennial plant in the genus Fouquieria, known by the vernacular names palo santo, rabo de iguana, rosalillo, tlapacon, corona de Cristo and flor de jabon. It is native to central and southern Mexico (Chiapas, Oaxaca, Guerrero, Puebla, Morelos, Michoacán, México State, Distrito Federal, Jalisco).

== Description ==
Fouquieria formosa is a small tree growing to 8 m in height with hummingbird-pollinated flowers. Perching birds may also utilize the flowers. Carpenter bees and bumblebees are also likely visitors, as they may leave evidence of small, transverse cuts on the corolla tube that are characteristic of their robbing habit. Because the stamens and stigma protrude significantly from the flower tube, insects visitors likely do not affect pollination.

=== Morphology ===
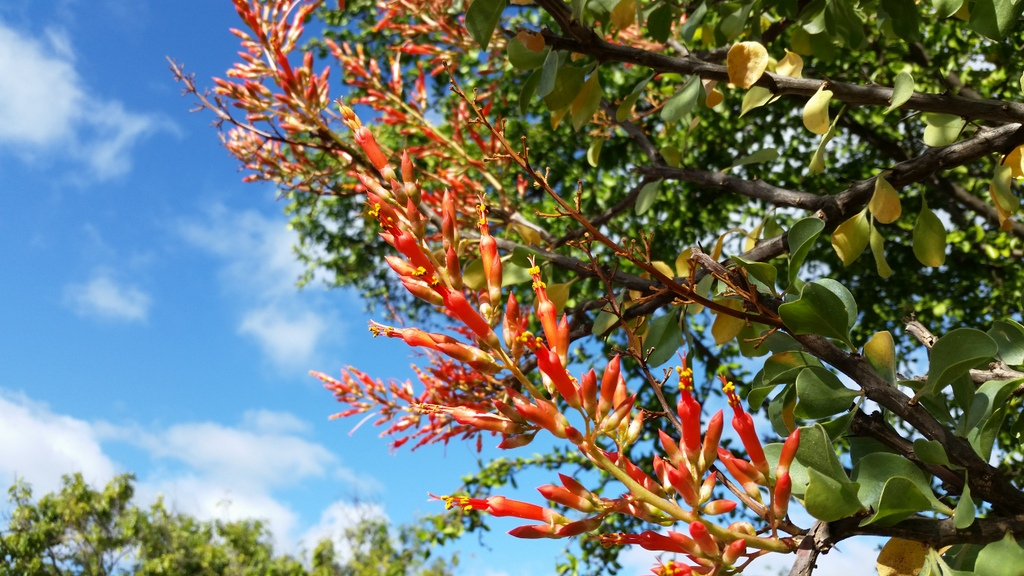
Flowering in cultivation

It is a small tree 3 to 8 meters high, with 1 to 2 basal trunks 25 to 40 cm in diameter. The larger stems are dichotomously branched, bearing numerous erect to widely spreading young stems. The periderm of the plant is smooth, colored dark bronze to yellow, and exfoliates in thin, papery sheets. The larger stems and trunks are often green.

The branches are covered in spines, although they vary in length per population, with some spines being as short as 4 mm to as long as 20 mm. Some populations may almost lack spines entirely. It has short, spicate inflorescences with large deep orange-red to yellow-orange flowers, that have decurved corollas and a variable number of stamens. There is a high level of phenotypic variation in this species throughout its range, and the variations in spine length and stamen number are not constant on individuals, indicating environmental influences on their development.

=== Taxonomy ===
The location of the type collection is unknown, although the small spines and low stamen numbers may indicate a location in the state of Mexico or Morelos. While there are certain tendencies with the phenotypic variation in the species, subspecific names have not been established, because a strong geographic correlation of these varied traits does not occur.

== Distribution and habitat ==
This plant occurs on the rocky alluvial slopes and valleys on lateritic to calcareous soils from Jalisco to southeastern Oaxaca. It is found from tropical deciduous forests to arid tropical scrub vegetations at elevations from 2400 to 700 meters, down to 100 meters near Tehuantepec in Oaxaca. The average annual precipitation in its range occurs mainly from June through September. Flowering typically occurs from October through February, but it may also occur throughout the year.

Environmental conditions may induce variation based on the location of plants. In the arid regions within Puebla and Oaxaca, the plants in this area tend to have glabrous stems, long spines and short flowers, with a relatively medium to high number of stamens. In Morelos and Mexico, the moist highlands contain plants with short spines and a relatively medium to low numbers of stamens.
