= Pierre Fouquier =

French physician and professor of medicine

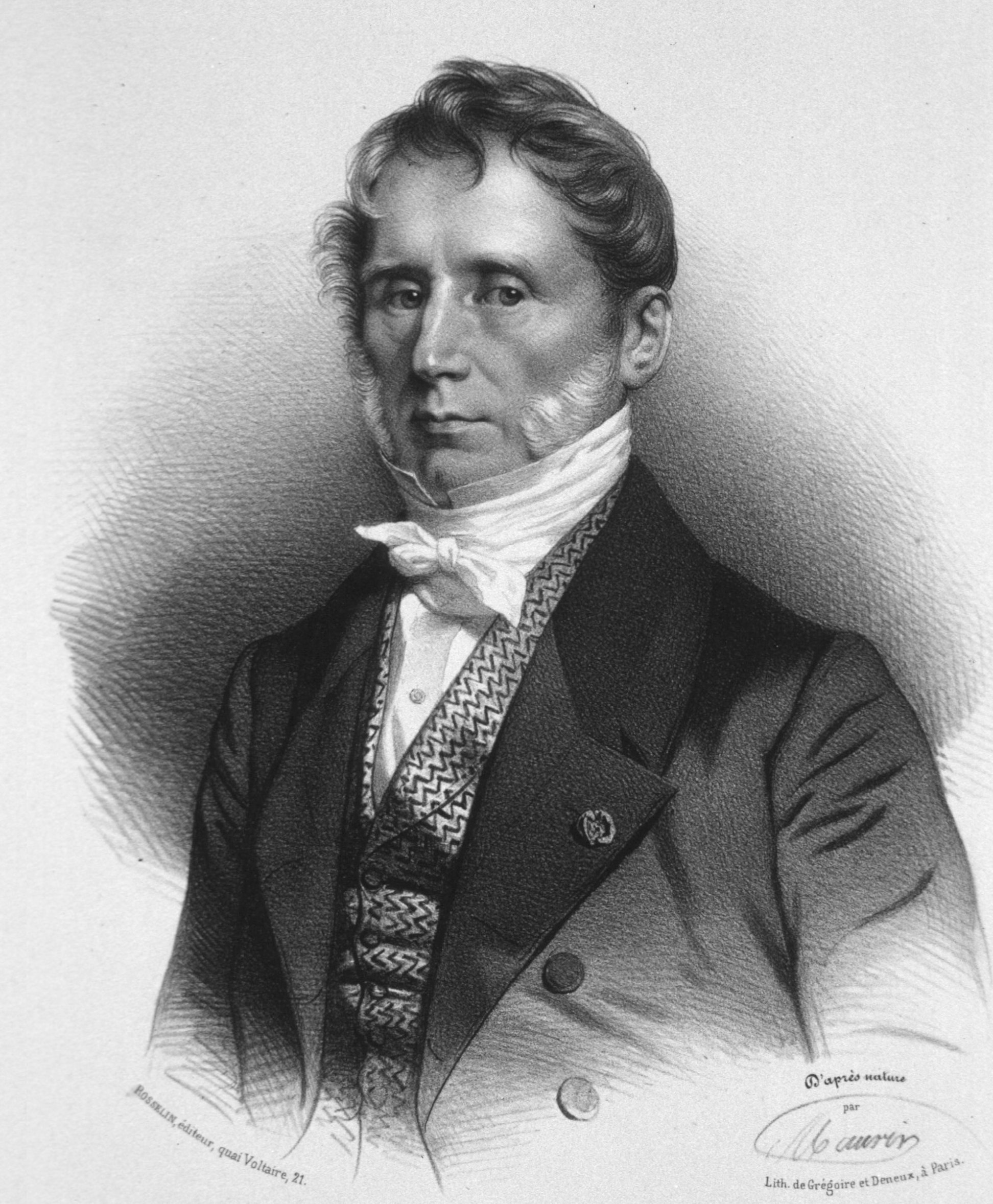

Pierre Éloi Fouquier (26 July 1776 – 1850) was a medical doctor and professor of medicine. Fouquier was born in Maissemy. He died in Paris.

== Titles and works ==
He was a member of the Académie Nationale de Médecine in 1820 and its president in 1842. He was a member of the High Commission for Medical Studies. He was the doctor of Charles X (1757–1836) and of Louis-Philippe (1773–1850) in 1840. He was Commander of the Legion of Honor in 1847. He is a translator of the "Treatise on Medicine" by Celse and the "Elements of Medicine" by Brown.

Carl Sigismund Kunth (1788–1850) named the genus Fouquieria in his honor.
