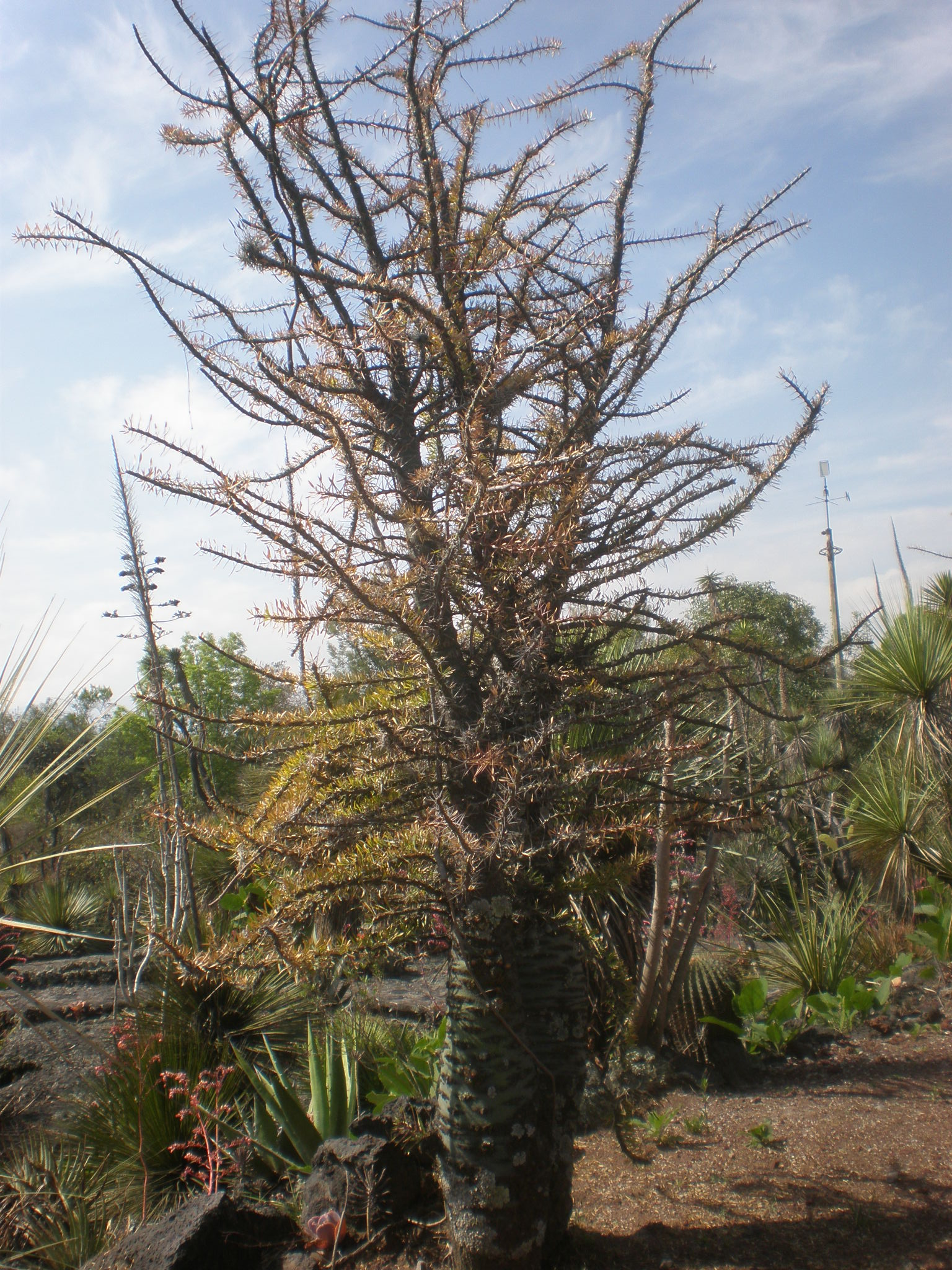

Conservation status
- Vulnerable (IUCN 3.1)
- CITES Appendix I

Scientific classification
- Kingdom: Plantae
- Clade: Tracheophytes
- Clade: Angiosperms
- Clade: Eudicots
- Clade: Asterids
- Order: Ericales
- Family: Fouquieriaceae
- Genus: Fouquieria
- Species: F. fasciculata

Binomial name
- Fouquieria fasciculata (Willd. ex Roem. & Schult.) Nash

= Fouquieria fasciculata =

Plant endemic to Southern Hidalgo, Mexico

Fouquieria fasciculata is a species of desert flowering plant in the family Fouquieriaceae. It is endemic to southern Hidalgo, Mexico.

== Range ==
Fouquieria fasciculata is found in ravines of the Moctezuma River and its tributaries, west of the Sierra Madre Oriental, north of Actopan and Atotonilco el Grande.

== Conservation status ==
Fouquieria fasciculata has been classified as vulnerable due to its small number of population groups, limited range and threats from mining expansion, livestock grazing, agriculture encroachment and pollution.

== Gallery ==
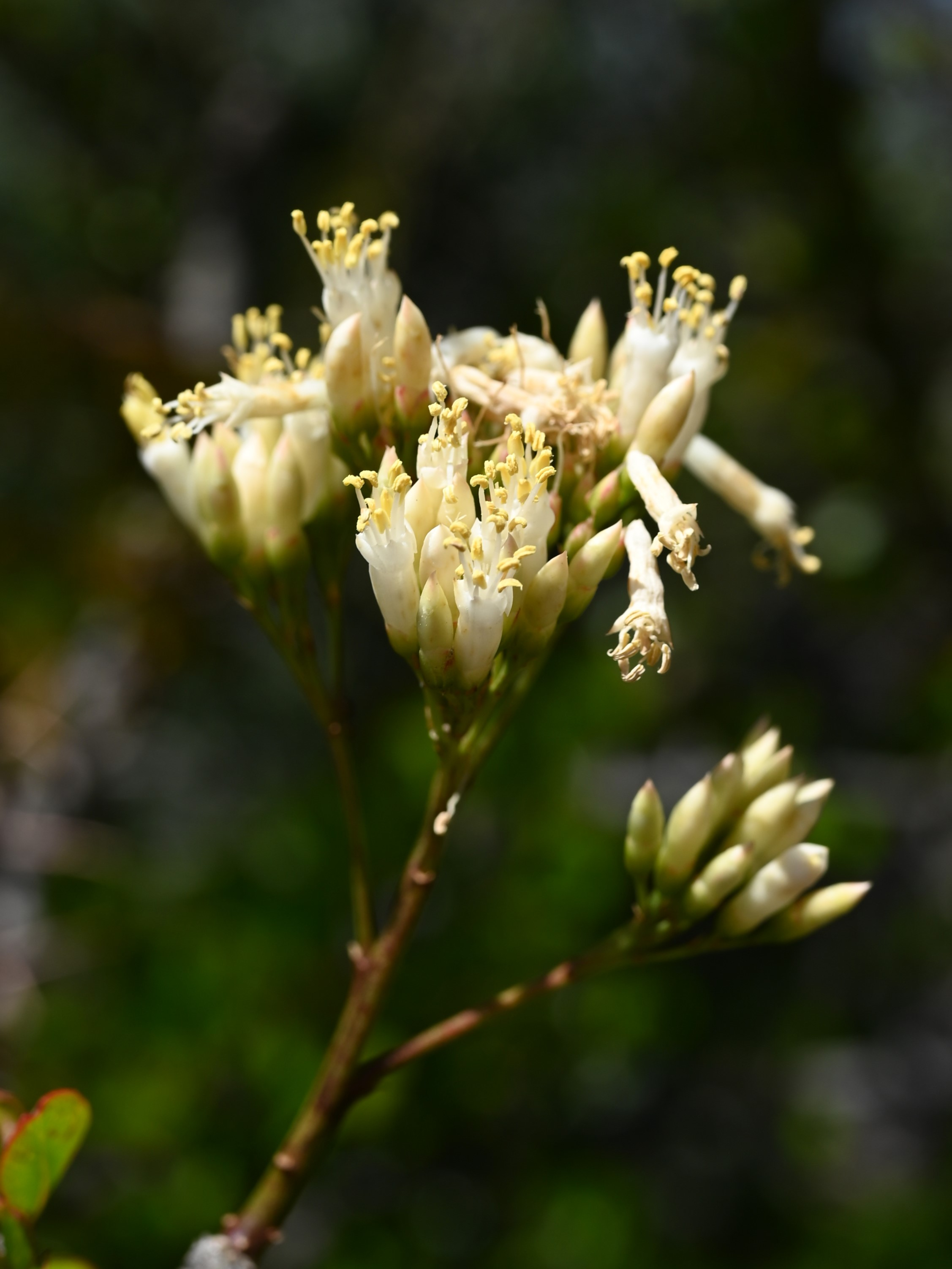
Inflorescence

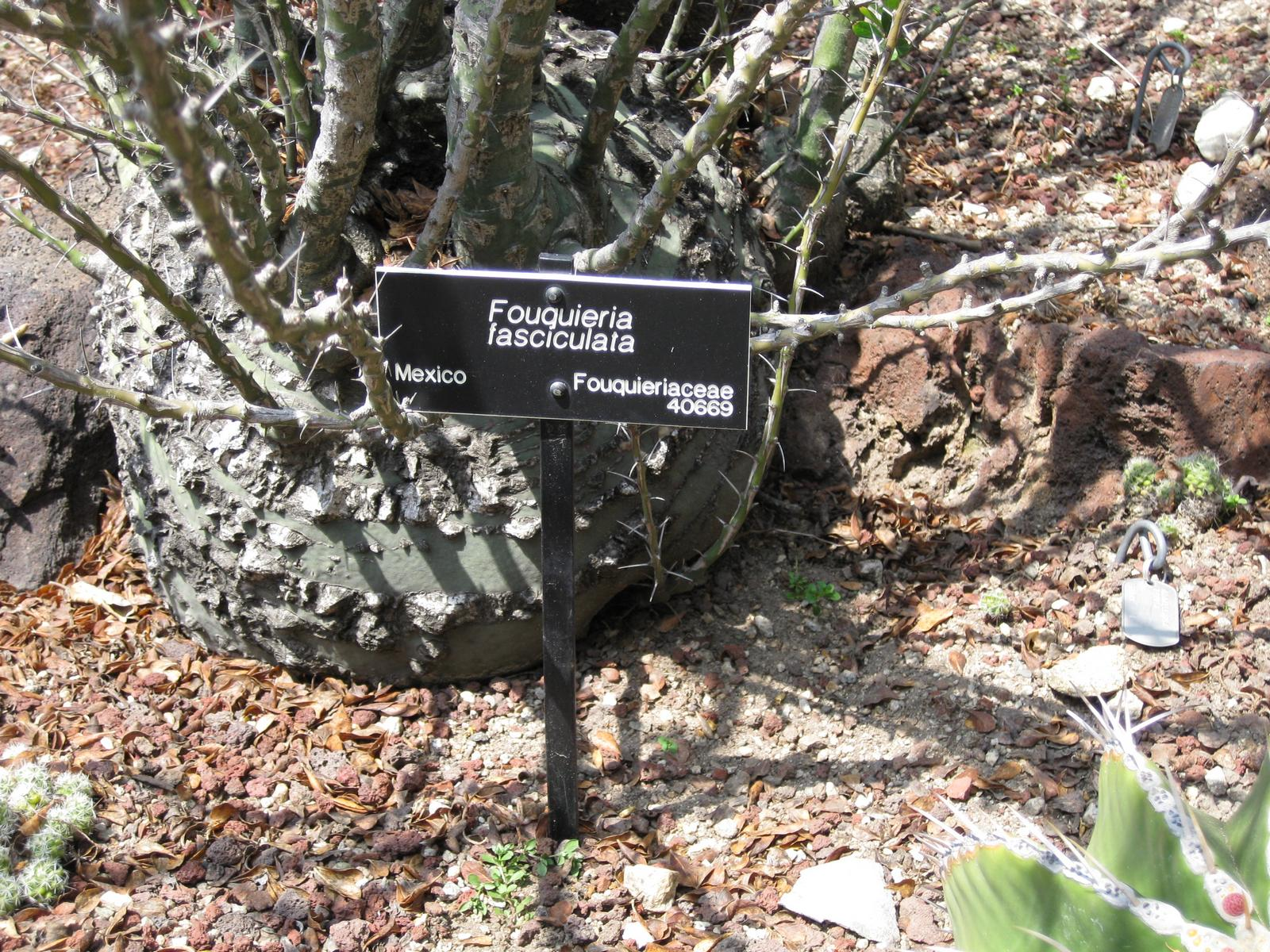
Distinctive caudex

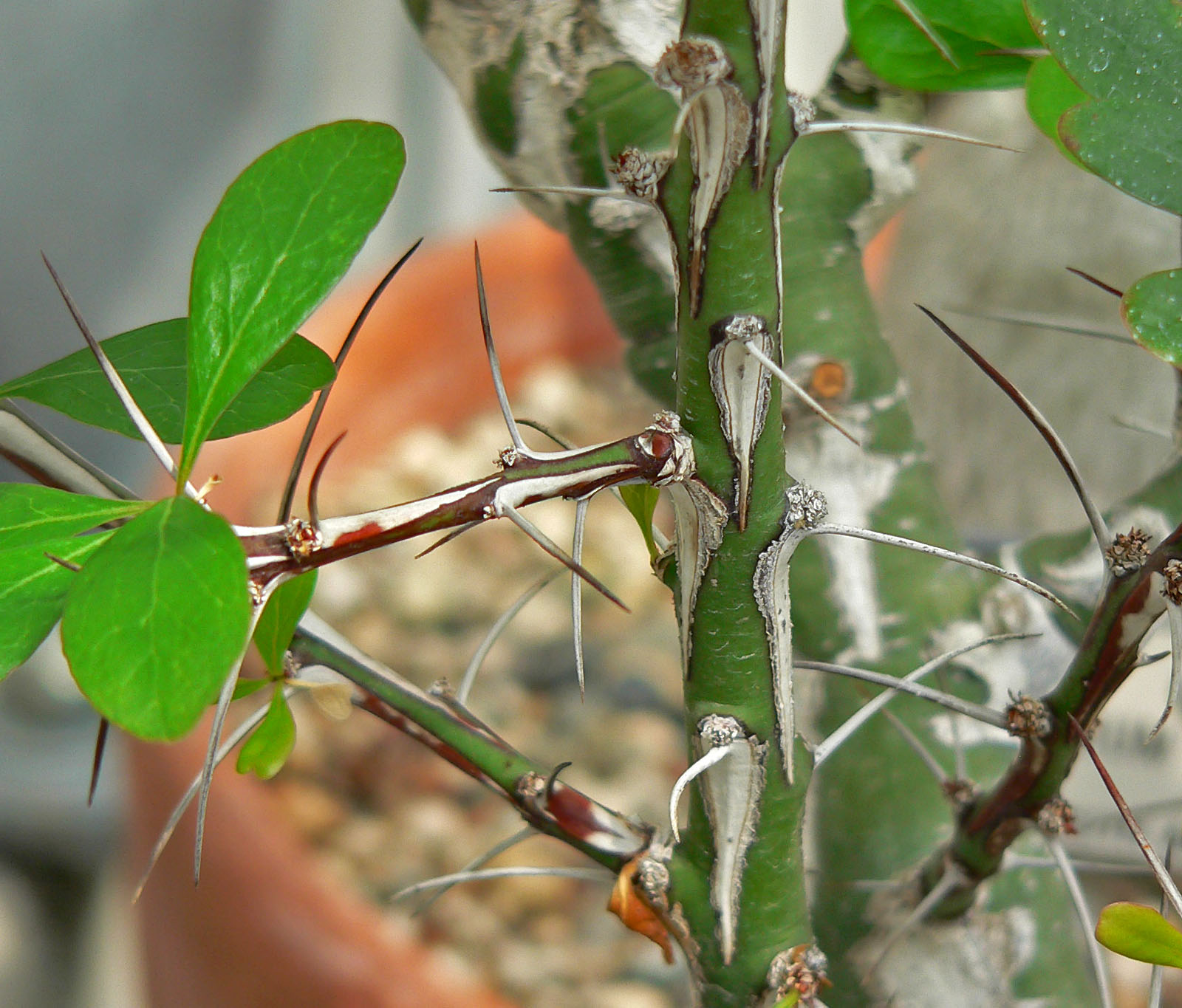
Stem and leaves
