= Mary Katharine Brandegee =

American botanist

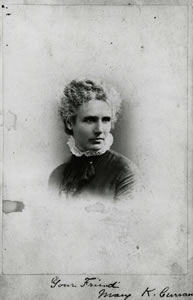
- Born: Mary Katharine Layne; October 28, 1844; Tennessee
- Died: April 3, 1920 (aged 75); Berkeley, California, U.S.
- Education: University of California, San Francisco
- Known for: studies of California flora
- Spouses: Hugh Curran (1866-1874; his death); Townshend Stith Brandegee (1889-1920; her death)
- Scientific career
- Fields: Botany
- Workplaces: California Academy of Sciences
- Author abbrev. (botany): Curran, K.Brandegee

Mary Katharine Brandegee (formerly Curran, née Layne; October 28, 1844 – April 3, 1920) was an American botanist known for her comprehensive studies of flora in California. She was also the first woman curator of the botany department at the California Academy of Sciences.

== Life ==
Brandegee was born Mary Katharine Layne in Tennessee on October 28, 1844. She was the second child to Mary Morris Layne, a housewife, and Marshall Layne, a farmer. The Laynes lived in western Tennessee and had nine other children. Her family, already peripatetic, moved to California during the Gold Rush of 1849, although her father chose to farm; they settled in Folsom, California when Brandegee was 9.

In 1866, Brandegee married constable Hugh Curran and remained married to him until 1874, when he died of alcoholism. She got married again 1889, to Townshend Brandegee; they shared a love of science as she was a botanist and he was a civil engineer and plant collector. The couple walked from San Diego to San Francisco collecting plants for their honeymoon.

Brandegee died on April 3, 1920, in Berkeley, California, aged 75.

== Career and legacy ==
The year after Curran died, Brandegee moved to San Francisco to attend medical school at the University of California at Berkeley, becoming the third woman to ever matriculate there. There, she studied medicinal plants and became interested in botany. She received her M.D. in 1878, became licensed in California, and became a member of the California State Medical Society, but chose not to practice medicine. Botanist Hans Hermann Behr took her on as a student in 1879.

Brandegee became a member at the California Academy of Sciences in San Francisco. She collected plants throughout the state and worked in the academy's herbarium to continue her botanical training, working alongside Albert Kellogg. As she traveled, Brandegee found that several newly discovered species were actually not distinct. She believed in evolution, unlike Kellogg and botanist colleague Edward Lee Greene, and she painstakingly researched botanical specimens to ensure that they had not previously been described, or were only varieties of known species. Her specimens also allowed later scientists to precisely determine the ranges of plants in the Western US.

After Kellogg retired in 1883, Brandegee became the academy's botany curator. As curator, she turned her energy to improving the herbarium and took up writing and editing to establish and produce the Bulletin of the California Academy of Sciences. Brandegee was a systematic botanist who became impatient with submitting species to Gray for a botanical description. As “acting editor” she provided botanists on the West Coast a way to publish their findings quickly instead of routing all new species naming through Asa Gray at Harvard, allowing for scientific independence.

The Brandegees met H. W. Harkness at the California Academy of Sciences, and with him they founded the botanical journal, Zoe, in 1890. Zoe provided a platform for articles, reviews and criticisms of her contemporaries. Bradengee also helped establish the California Botanical Club, a group that welcomed both professional and amateur botanists across the Pacific Coast, fostering collaboration within the botanical community.

In 1891, Brandegee took a pay cut to bring Alice Eastwood on board as a co-curator of the herbarium. Two years later when she resigned, Eastwood continued as the sole curator. Brandegee and Townshend relocated in 1894 to San Diego. They settled in the Bankers Hill area and established a brick herbarium and San Diego's first botanical garden on their property. Together, they collected plants throughout California, Arizona, and Mexico.

After the 1906 earthquake in San Francisco, the couple moved back and donated over 76,000 specimens from their personal collection to the University of California, Berkeley. Despite the fact that she was a diabetic who suffered regular attacks, as insulin treatment had yet to be invented, Brandegee continued to collect specimens in California until her death in 1920.
