= Albert Kellogg =

American botanist (1813–1887)

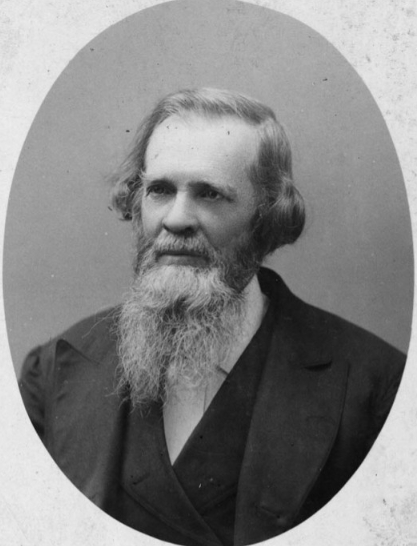
- Born: December 6, 1813; New Hartford, Connecticut, United States
- Died: March 31, 1887 (aged 73)
- Scientific career
- Fields: Botany

Albert Kellogg (December 6, 1813 – March 31, 1887 ) was an American medical doctor and the first resident botanist of California. He was a founding member of the California Academy of Sciences and served as its first curator of botany. Kellogg was a prolific writer and an accomplished illustrator of botanical specimens. In 1882, he published "The Forest Trees of California", the first scientific account of the state's diverse forest species.

== Early life ==
Albert Kellogg was born in New Hartford, Connecticut, on December 6, 1813, the son of Isaac and Aurilla Barney, prosperous farmers with a long family history in New England. After receiving a basic education in the local village schools, Kellogg was placed with a prominent physician in Middletown, Connecticut, in preparation for a medical career. Ill health forced him to return to the family farm where he spent time exploring the nearby woods and collecting herbs. He never fully recovered his health but eventually moved to the South in hopes that the milder climate would help. He studied medicine at the Medical College of South Carolina and at Transylvania University in Lexington, Kentucky, where he graduated with a medical degree.

Kellogg practiced medicine in Kentucky, Georgia, and Alabama, while taking every opportunity to explore the vegetation of the region and collect botanical specimens. On one of his journeys, in 1845, he traveled as far as San Antonio, Texas. After returning to New England in 1848, he moved to California with a group of men who were eager to join the gold rush. They purchased a schooner and sailed through the Straits of Magellan, reaching Sacramento in August, 1849.

== California ==
Kellogg worked for the Connecticut Mining and Trading Company in Sacramento and the nearby mining regions for the next three or four years. He later settled in San Francisco where he opened a pharmacy and practiced medicine to a limited extent. These endeavors were not very successful, for as one biographer noted, he "was almost too much engrossed with hunting and working over new plants to patiently wait upon customers." Kellogg focused most of his time and energy on his botanical interests. In 1852, he undertook the first detailed and systematic study of the giant redwood (Sequoiadendron giganteum) but did not publish it until 1855, two years after John Lindley published his article on the tree.

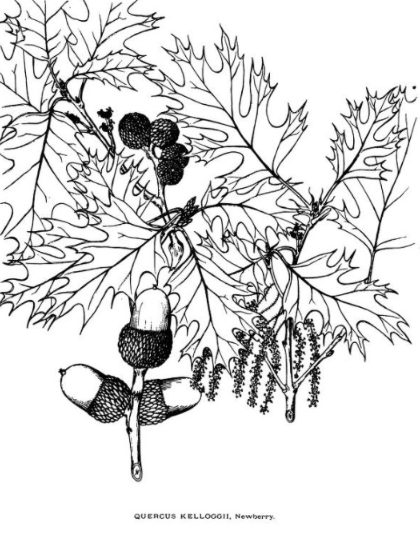
Illustration of Quercus kelloggii by Albert Kellogg

On 4 April 1853, Kellogg was one of seven men to meet and form the California Academy of Sciences. Their stated goal was the promotion of natural science in the new state of California. Kellogg was devoted to the organization from its beginning and served in various administrative roles including vice-president, librarian, curator, and museum director. He was the academy's first curator of botany and enthusiastically encouraged members and visitors to bring him plant specimens for identification and study.

At a meeting on 1 August 1853, Kellogg proposed "that we highly approve of the aid of females in every department of natural history, and that we earnestly invite their cooperation." His motion was approved and the academy became one of the first institutions in the world to recognize and encourage the ability of women in the scientific and intellectual sphere. Katherine Brandegee and Alice Eastwood were two women botanists who were later hired as curators for the academy.

Kellogg was hired as botanist and surgeon by the United States Coast Survey for an expedition to Alaska in 1867, the year the territory was purchased. There he collected almost five hundred species of plants in triplicate and sent those collections to the Smithsonian Institution, the Academy of Natural Sciences in Philadelphia, and the California Academy of Sciences. He also made a careful study of coastal tree species.

Kellogg wrote numerous papers on California plants and published them in the official Academy publications as well as local newspapers and magazines. He was an accomplished artist and many of his papers were accompanied by his illustrations. Kellogg's publications resulted in the initial descriptions of several plant genera and 215 species. In 1882, he published "The Forest Trees of California", the first scientific account of the state's remarkable forests.

Kellogg was the last surviving charter member of the academy. He remained active in its affairs until his death on March 31, 1887, in Alameda, California.

Following his death, Kellogg's drawings of oaks were published by Edward Lee Greene in a book titled "Illustrations of West American Oaks" (1889).
