= Townshend Stith Brandegee =

American botanist (1843–1925)

- Born: February 16, 1843; Berlin, Connecticut
- Died: April 7, 1925 (aged 82)
- Education: Sheffield Scientific School
- Spouse(s): Katharine Layne Curran (born Mary Katharine Layne; m. 1889-1920, her death)
- Scientific career
- Fields: Botany
- Workplaces: Botanical Society of America; California Academy of Sciences; National Geographical Society; Sigma Xi
- Author abbrev. (botany): Brandegee

Townshend Stith Brandegee (February 16, 1843 – April 7, 1925) was an American botanist. He was an authority on the flora of Baja California and the Channel Islands of California.

== Early life ==
Brandegee was born on February 16, 1843, in Berlin, Connecticut. From 1862 to 1864 he served in the Connecticut Artillery and later decided to become an engineer. He received a degree in engineering from Sheffield Scientific School, but then pursued botany after he participated at some classes with Daniel Cady Eaton in Yale University.

After graduating, he became a county surveyor and city engineer at Canon City, Colorado, where in his free time, he also collected certain species of plants. He was accustomed with John H. Redfield and Asa Gray, the latter of which suggested he join Ferdinand V. Hayden's expedition to southwest Colorado and Utah, where he used his skills as a surveyor, as well as skills in botany. Brandegee was hired as a railroad surveyor in both Arkansas and New Mexico and continued with plant collecting. Later on, he was hired at the Northern Transcontinental Survey and created a map of Adirondack region. On his journey he visited Santa Cruz and Santa Rosa Islands, on one of which he collected wood for Charles Sprague Sargent.

== Work, marriage and publications ==
Brandegee moved to San Francisco, where he became a member of the California Academy of Sciences, and continued studying plants there and in Baja California, Mexico. Besides being a member of the CAS, he was also a member of Botanical Society of America, National Geographical Society, Sigma Xi and a fellow at the American Association for the Advancement of Science. From 1889 to 1906 he wrote a 12-volume work called Plantae Mexicanae Purpusianae which was published in collaboration with Carl A. Purpus. He married a fellow botanist, Katharine Layne Curran in San Diego in 1889. In 1906, he moved to Berkeley, California, where he died on April 7, 1925.

== See also ==
Category:Taxa named by Townshend Stith Brandegee
