= List of airports in Baja California Sur =

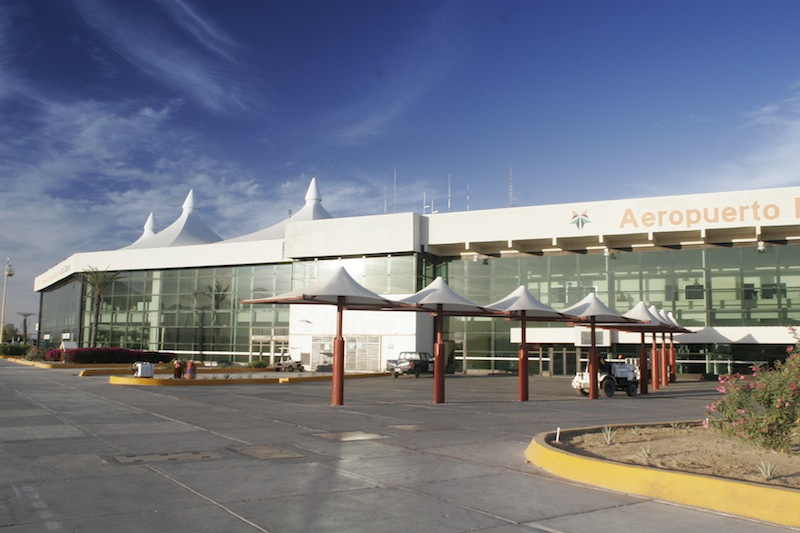
Terminal 1 at Los Cabos International Airport

This is a list of airports in the state of Baja California Sur, Mexico, categorized by airport name, ICAO and IATA codes, and the largest city served. It includes public, private, military, and defunct airports. Airports with scheduled passenger flights on commercial airlines are in bold, as of 2025. Separate Wikipedia lists cover airports in Baja California and all airports in Mexico.

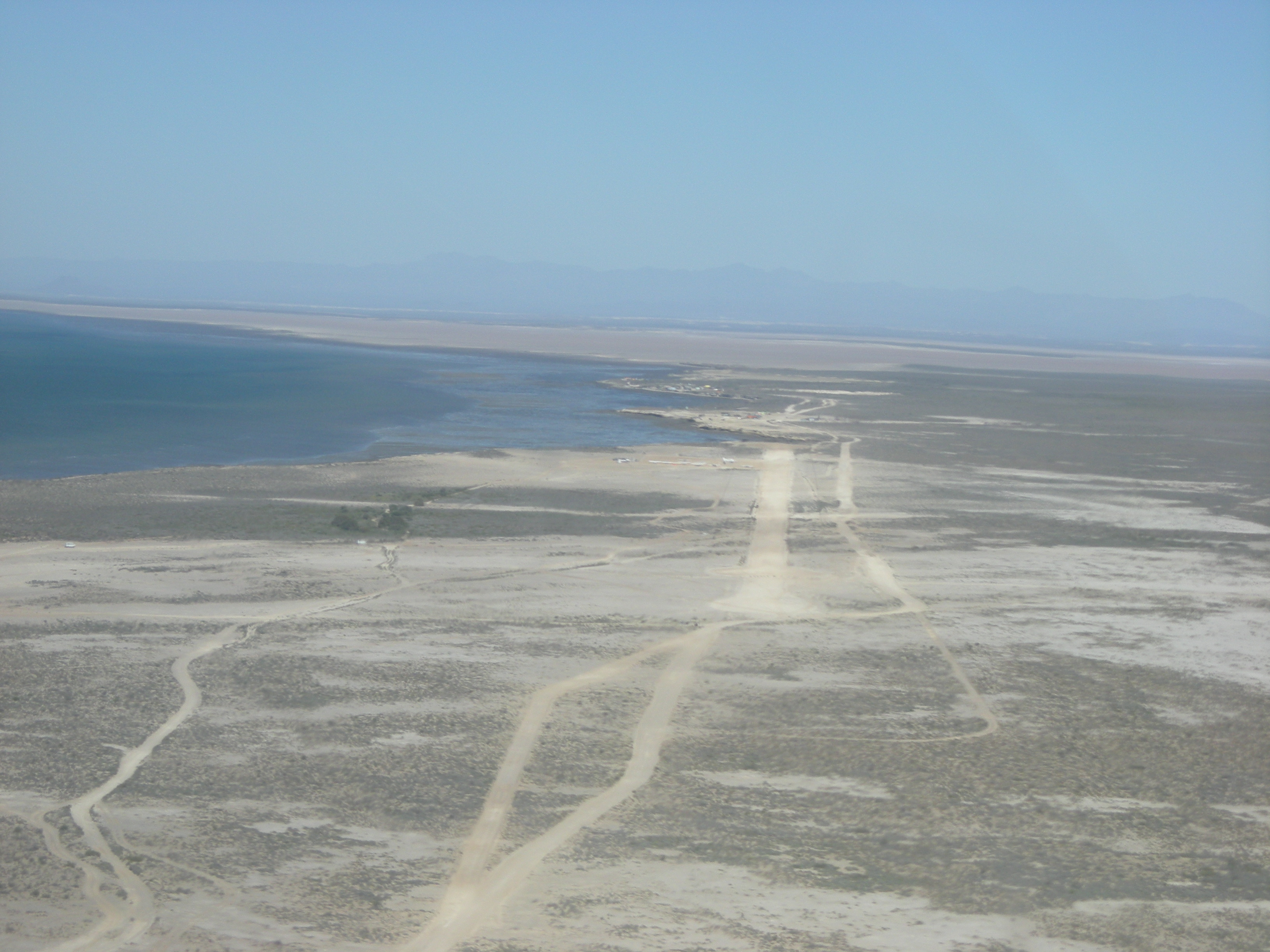
Laguna San Ignacio Airstrip is a private dirt airstrip located in the municipality of Mulegé

Baja California Sur has six airports and a vast network of airstrips—many unpaved—that serve its remote, sparsely populated communities, which are physically separated from mainland Mexico by the Gulf of California. Los Cabos International Airport in San José del Cabo is the state’s largest and busiest airport, ranking as the sixth busiest in Mexico. It serves as the main gateway to the Los Cabos region, which receives millions of tourists, mostly from the U.S. and Canada. Guerrero Negro Airport is just over the border in Baja California, but primarily serves Guerrero Negro, Baja California Sur.

== Airports ==
City served	ICAO	IATA	Airport name
International airports
Cabo San Lucas	MMSL	CSL	**Cabo San Lucas International Airport**
La Paz	MMLP	LAP	**La Paz International Airport**
Loreto	MMLT	LTO	**Loreto International Airport**
San José del Cabo	MMSD	SJD	**Los Cabos International Airport**
Domestic airports
Ciudad Constitución	MMDA	CUA	**Ciudad Constitución Airport**
Santa Rosalía		PVP	Palo Verde Airport
Airfields
Bahía Asunción			Bahía Asunción Airstrip
Bahía Ballenas			Bahía Ballenas Airstrip
Bahía Tortugas			Bahía Tortugas Airfield
Cadejé			Cadejé Airstrip
Ejido Melitón Albáñez Domínguez			Melitón Albáñez Domínguez Airstrip
Isla Magdalena			Punta Belcher Airstrip
Isla Natividad			Isla Natividad Airstrip
La Bocana			La Bocana Airstrip
La Ribera			La Ribera Airstrip
La Ribera	MMPL	PCO	Punta Colorada Airstrip
Los Frailes			Los Frailes Airstrip
Mulegé			El Gallito Airstrip
Mulegé	MMMG	MUG	Mulegé Municipal Airstrip
Mulegé			Punta San Pedro Airstrip
Puerto Adolfo López Mateos			Puerto Adolfo López Mateos Airstrip
Punta Abreojos		AJS	Punta Abreojos Airstrip
San Ignacio		SGM	San Ignacio Airfield
San Ignacio			San Ignacio Downtown Airstrip
San Juan de los Planes			Punta Arena Airstrip
Santa Rosalía			Santa María de Mulegé Airport
Private-use airfields
Isla del Carmen			Isla del Carmen Airstrip
Isla San Marcos			Isla San Marcos Airstrip
Laguna San Ignacio			Laguna San Ignacio Airstrip
La Purísima			Palo Blanco Airstrip
La Purísima			Río de Agua de Vida Airstrip
Las Cruces			Rancho Las Cruces Airstrip
Mulegé			Rancho Chávez Airstrip
Punta Chivato		PCV	Punta Chivato Airstrip
Punta Pescadero			Punta Pescadero Airstrip
Todos Santos			Todos Santos Airstrip
Vizcaíno			Rancho El Caracol Airfield
Military-only airfields
Puerto Cortez			Puerto Cortés Military Airstrip
Santa Rosalía			San Lucas Military Airstrip
Defunct airfields
Ciudad Constitución		~~VIB~~	Villa Constitución Airport
Las Barrancas			Las Barrancas Airstrip
San Juanico			San Juanico Airstrip

== See also ==
- List of airports in Mexico
- List of the busiest airports in Mexico
- Busiest airports in North America
- Busiest airports in Latin America
- Airfields in Baja California
- Small airstrips
- Military bases
- Air Force bases
- Naval air bases
- Lists of airports
- International airports
- Defunct airports
- Airports by ICAO code
- Airlines of Mexico
- Airline hubs
- Airline destinations
- Transportation in Mexico
- Tourism in Mexico
- Federal Civil Aviation Agency
- Grupo Aeroportuario del Sureste
- Grupo Aeroportuario del Pacífico
- Grupo Aeroportuario del Centro Norte
- Aeropuertos y Servicios Auxiliares
- List of busiest airports by passenger traffic
- Metropolitan areas of Mexico
