= San Ignacio Downtown Airstrip =

- IATA: none; ICAO: none

Summary
- Airport type: Public
- Operator: N/A
- Location: San Ignacio, Baja California Sur
- Elevation AMSL: 570 ft / 174 m
- Coordinates: 27°17′30″N 112°53′04″W
- Interactive map of San Ignacio Downtown Airstrip

Runways
Direction	Length		Surface
Direction	ft	m	Surface
01/19	2,208	673	Soil
14/32	2,036	620	Soil

San Ignacio Downtown Airstrip is a pair of public dirt runways located East of San Ignacio, Municipality of Mulegé, Baja California Sur, Mexico. The airstrips are used solely for general aviation purposes. Although the airstrip is not paved as the San Ignacio West Airport, it's closer to the town and this is the advantage of using this airstrip. The SGM 2 and MSIC codes are used as identifiers.
