= Laguna San Ignacio Airstrip =

- IATA: none; ICAO: none

Summary
- Airport type: Private
- Owner: Jorge Peon
- Operator: Arida Baja Ecotours.
- Serves: Laguna San Ignacio
- Location: Mulegé Municipality, Baja California Sur state, Mexico
- Elevation AMSL: 9 ft / 3 m
- Coordinates: 26°50′55″N 113°08′26″W
- Website: https://web.archive.org/web/20130721081501/http://aridabajahotel.com/
- Interactive map of Laguna San Ignacio Airstrip

Runways
Direction	Length		Surface
Direction	ft	m	Surface
18/36	4,333	1,300	Soil

Laguna San Ignacio Airstrip (IATA: N/A) is a private dirt airstrip located in Laguna San Ignacio, Municipality of Mulegé, Baja California Sur, Mexico.

Laguna San Ignacio is a small village located on the San Ignacio Lagoon shore, a world-renowned nursery and breeding ground for the gray whale that is within the limits of the El Vizcaíno Biosphere Reserve.

The airstrip is used solely for general aviation purposes, specially for whale watching tourism. The RCX code is the official identifier.

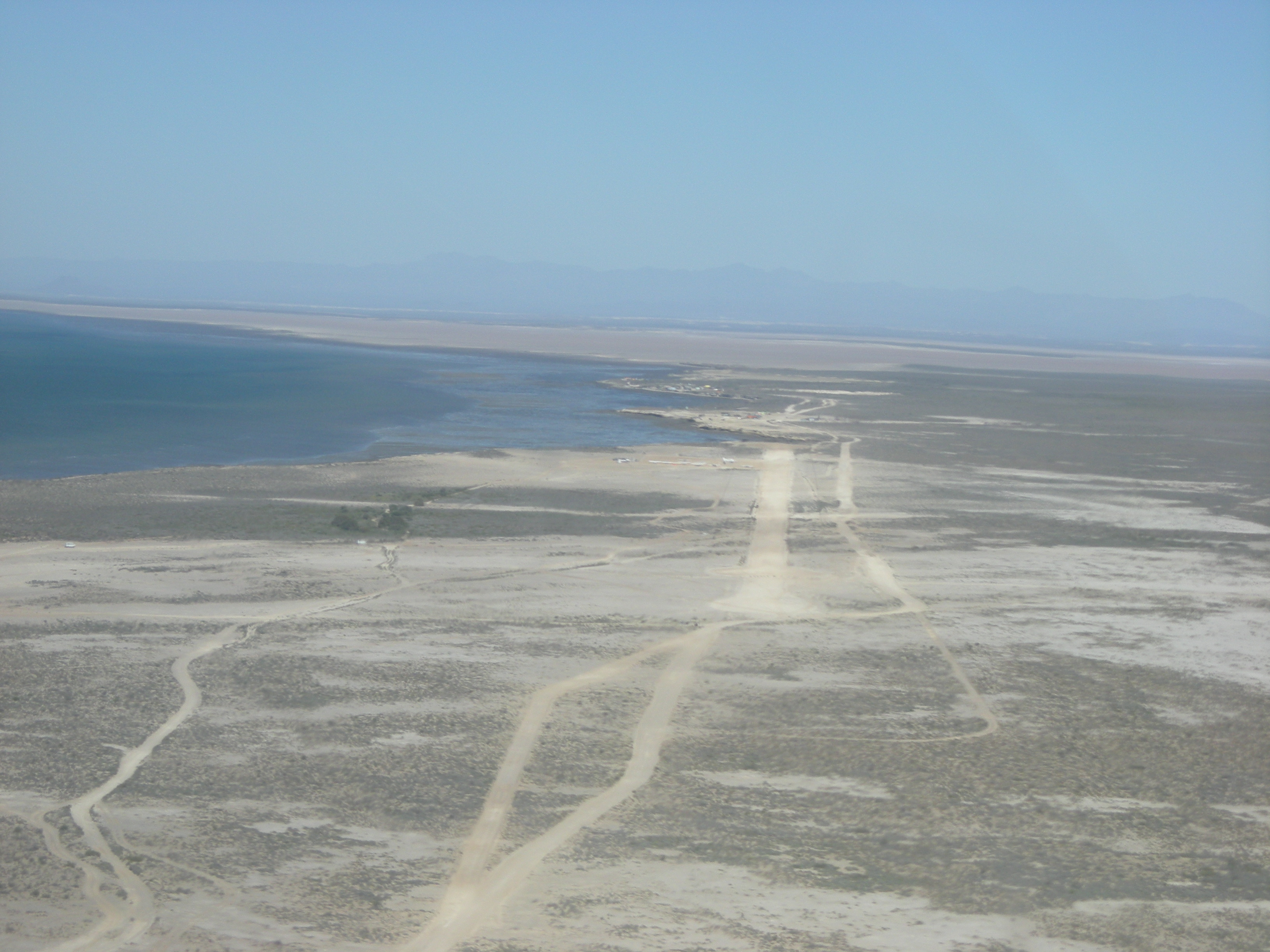
Airport and surrounding area, on approach.
