= Bahía Concepción, Baja California Sur =

Bay in Baja California Sur, Mexico

Coordinates: 26.67075°N 111.81359°W

Bahía Concepción is a bay on the Gulf of California, in southeastern Mulegé Municipality and the central-eastern part of the Baja California Peninsula, in Baja California Sur state, Mexico.

It one of the largest bays of the Baja California Peninsula. It is around 20 miles (32 km) south of the town of Mulegé.

== Features ==
Bahía Concepción features over 50 miles of beaches. Some of the more popular beaches include (from north to south) Playa Los Naranjos, Playa Punta Arena, Playa Santispac, Playa Escondida, Playa Los Cocos, Playa El Coyote, Playa Buenaventure, Playa El Requeson, Playa Armenta.

Entry into the sheltered bays near Playa Santispac is marked by a lighthouse on Isla Pitahaya.

Close to Mapachitos area, hydrothermal manifestations can be found, related to the opening of the Gulf of California.

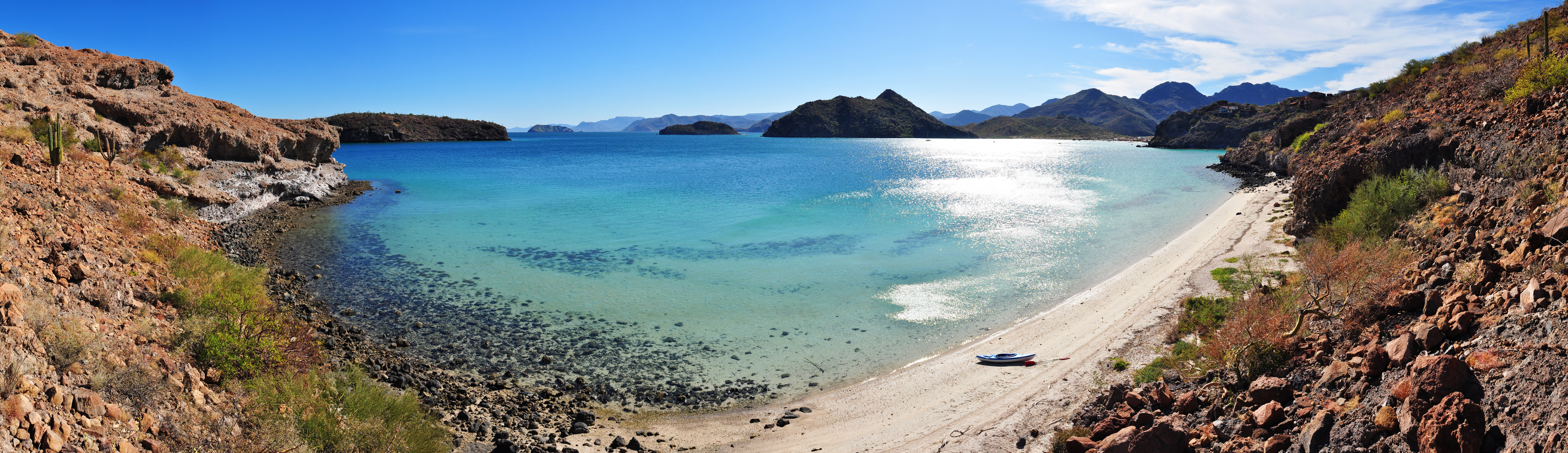
180° Panorama on Playa Santispac of Bahía Concepción, Baja California Sur. Several islands are visible in the bay: (left to right) Isla San Ramon, Isla Blanca, and Isla Coyote. On the right is Playa Concepcion with its associated developments visible.
