= ENW =

ENW or enw may refer to:

- Kenosha Regional Airport, Wisconsin, US (by IATA and FAA LID codes)
- Palo Blanco Airstrip, Mexico (by DGAC code)
- Electricity North West, a British electricity distribution network operator
- Enwang language, spoken in Nigeria (by ISO 639 code)
