= Fernando Consag =

Croatian missionary and explorer

Ferdinand Konščak Fernando Consag
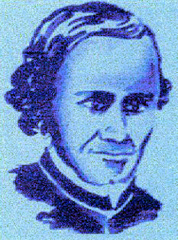
- Portrait of Ferdinand Consag
- Born: 2 December 1703; Varaždin, Kingdom of Croatia within Habsburg monarchy
- Died: 10 September 1759 (aged 55); San Ignacio, Baja California Sur, Mexico
- Education: Society of Jesus in Trenčín, philosophy in Graz, Jesuit Academy in Zagreb, theology at the University of Graz.
- Church: Mission San Ignacio, Catholic Church in Mexico
- Ordained: ~1725
- Title: Jesuit priest

Fernando Consag, known in his native Croatian as Ferdinand Konščak (December 2, 1703 – September 10, 1759), was a Croatian Jesuit missionary, explorer and cartographer, who spent most of his life in Mexico, in Baja California.

== Education ==
Consag was born in Varaždin, Croatia, and attended primary and secondary school in his native city. At sixteen he finished the expected grades and was admitted to the novitiate of the Society of Jesus in Trencsén, Hungary (now Trenčín, Slovakia), where he stayed for two years. He was then sent to Leoben in Styria to study classics, stylistics, and rhetoric. Later he studied philosophy in Graz, Austria and in 1725–1726 he lectured on the elements of grammar at the Jesuit Academy in Zagreb in Croatia. In 1726–1727 he taught classical studies at a secondary school in Buda in Hungary. In 1728 Consag published a collection of poems titled Nagadia versibus latinus, which is kept at Budapest. From 1727 to 1729 he studied theology at the University of Graz.

== Missionary ==
In 1729, Consag left for Cádiz in Spain, then went to North America, where he was active as a missionary on New Spain's Baja California Peninsula (today part of Mexico), from 1732 to the end of his life. His headquarters was at Mission San Ignacio. From 1748 he acted as the superior of the mission and later, in 1758, inspector of all missions in Baja California. Consag spoke various dialects of the local Cochimí language. He directed and oversaw the building of new missions, aqueducts, embankments, drainage channels, and the first silver mines. He died at San Ignacio in 1759.

== Expeditions ==
Consag mounted three expeditions (in 1746, 1751 and 1753) systematically exploring previously unknown parts of the peninsula.

In June and July 1746 he was sent by sea to the head of the Gulf of California in order to investigate the disputed question of whether Baja California was an island. Although he closely followed the coast and reached the Colorado River, the issue continued to be in dispute for nearly another three decades

His second expedition comprised a journey by land across the peninsula to the Pacific coast. The third expedition went up the western side of the peninsula, to around 30 degrees of latitude near Bahía San Luis Gonzaga.

During his expeditions, Consag recorded information on the peninsula's unknown topography, natural resources, and native inhabitants.

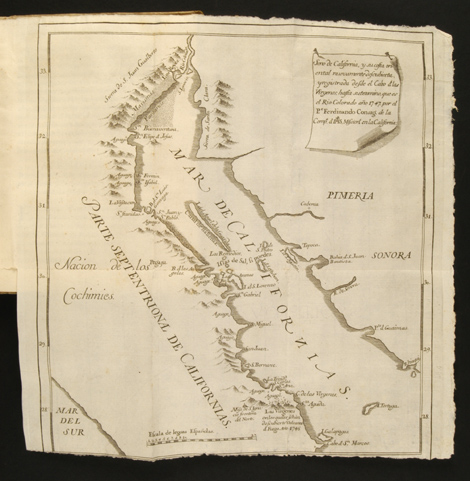
Map of the Gulf of California made by Consag (approx. 1750)

== Maps and writings ==
On the basis of the data obtained, Consag made a precise map of Baja California (1748) and a map of the Gulf of California (around 1750).

His maps of the regions explored were popular at the time frequently copied and used. Denis Diderot and D'Alembert used some of them within the French encyclopedia, where his name is cited as "P. Consaqua". Alexander von Humboldt used the maps in his work Carte generale ... de la Nouvelle Espagne, (Paris, 1804). The same is the case with Arrowsmith in his book Map of America, published in London in 1805.

His diaries, after his death translated and reprinted into many languages, were published during his lifetime by Villa-Señor y Sanchez, Ortega-Balthasar, and Venegas-Buriel.

The 1761 copy of his manuscript on California is held in the British Museum. His Carta del P. Fernando Consag de la Compañia de Jesus, Visitador de las Misiones de Californias are kept at:

- British Museum in London
- Library of Congress in Washington
- John Carter Library in Providence, Rhode Island
- Honnold-Mudd Library of the Claremont Colleges in Claremont, California
- The Huntington Library in San Marino, California

Seven copies of maps are published by Ernest J. Burrus.

Consag's name has also been associated with two anonymous accounts of Baja California: Descripción compendiosa de lo descubierto y conocido de la California and Adiciones to the same. Homer Aschmann in 1966 and Damir Zorić in 2000 suggested that Consag was the author of the second of these, while Miguel León-Portilla in 1988 suggested that he wrote the first.

== Legacy ==
There is an outcrop in the northern Gulf of California named Roca Consag, located offshore near San Felipe. Consag mapped many water springs so that even today there are shops and other facilities in California bearing his name like "Licores Konsag", (Liquor Store and Market), "Konsaqua" (purified water).
