= Rancho El Caracol Airfield =

- IATA: none; ICAO: none

Summary
- Airport type: Private, general aviation
- Operator: Lácteos La Jolla SA de CV
- Serves: Rancho El Caracol
- Location: Mulegé Municipality, Baja California Sur state, Mexico
- Elevation AMSL: 238 ft / 72 m
- Coordinates: 27°30′57″N 113°19′47″W
- Interactive map of Rancho El Caracol Airfield

Runways
| Direction | Length | | Surface |
| Direction | ft | m | Surface |
|---|---|---|---|
| 13/31 | 4,493 | 1,369 | Asphalt |

Rancho El Caracol Airfield (IATA: N/A) is a private paved airstrip located in Rancho "El Caracol", South of El Vizcaíno in the Municipality of Mulegé, Baja California Sur, Mexico.

It is to the west of the Federal Highway 1. This ranch is where the famous "Leche el Caracol" (El caracol brand milk) is produced.

The airfield is used solely for general aviation purposes. Sometimes the COL code is used as identifier.
