= Sierra de San Francisco =

Mountain range in Mexico

The Sierra de San Francisco is a mountain range in Mulegé Municipality of the northern region of Baja California Sur state, in northwestern Mexico.

== Geography ==
The Sierra de San Francisco are on the eastern side of the Baja California Peninsula, north of the town of San Ignacio, They are part of the Peninsular Ranges system, which extends from Southern California to the southern tip of the Baja California Peninsula.

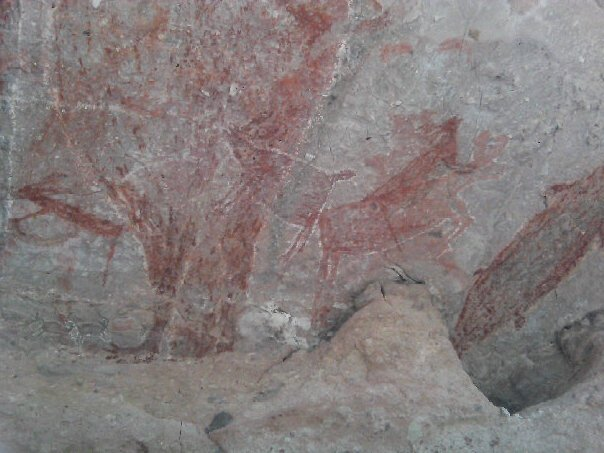
Rock Paintings of Sierra de San Francisco, by the Cochimí people.

History

Within the mountains are the prehistoric rock art pictographs of the Cochimí people, also known as the Rock Paintings of Sierra de San Francisco.

Natural history

The Sierra de San Francisco are within the El Vizcaíno Biosphere Reserve. The vegetation found in the Sierra de San Francisco range is of the Baja California desert ecoregion. A notable tree here is the Elephant tree (Bursera microphylla).

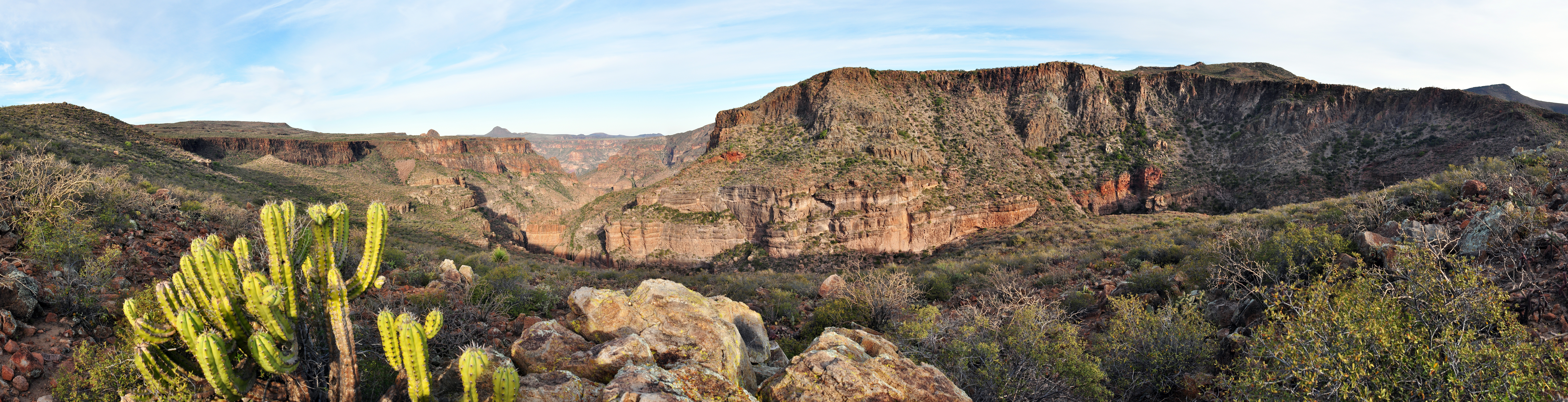
270° Panorama of a river-cut canyon in the Sierra de San Francisco of Baja California Sur.
The canyon and river drops towards the village of Santa Teresita.
The far right leads to the mountain village of San Francisco de la Sierra, locale of numerous prehistoric rock art pictographs.

== See also ==
- Tres Virgenes — complex of volcanoes on southeast
- Sierra de la Giganta — range to south
