= Rancho Chávez Airstrip =

- IATA: none; ICAO: none

Summary
- Airport type: Private
- Serves: Mulegé
- Location: Mulegé Municipality, Baja California Sur state, Mexico
- Elevation AMSL: 68 ft / 20 m
- Coordinates: 26°53′44″N 112°03′08″W
- Interactive map of Rancho Chávez Airstrip

Runways
Direction	Length		Surface
Direction	ft	m	Surface
01/19	4,166	1,269	Soil

Rancho Chávez Airstrip is a private dirt airstrip located 7 km West of Mulegé, in the Municipality of Mulegé, Baja California Sur, Mexico.

The airstrip is used solely for general aviation, and may be temporarily closed. The MLG2 code was used as identifier.
