= San Ignacio Airfield =

San Ignacio Airfield Aeropuerto de San Ignacio
- IATA: SGM; ICAO: MM26; LID: SIY

Summary
- Airport type: Public
- Serves: San Ignacio, Municipality of Mulegé, Baja California Sur, Mexico
- Elevation AMSL: 244 m (801 ft)
- Coordinates: 27°17′49″N 112°56′19″W

Map
- Location of the airport in Mexico

Runways
Direction	Length		Surface
Direction	m	ft	Surface
17/35	1,513	4,964	Asphalt
- Source: GCM, STV.

San Ignacio Airfield (IATA: SGM) (Spanish: Aeropuerto de San Ignacio) is a public paved airstrip located 4 kilometres (2.5 mi) northwest of San Ignacio, Municipality of Mulegé, Baja California Sur, Mexico. The airport is used solely for general aviation purposes. It is usually open during the whale watching season.
