= Bahía Ballenas Airstrip =

- IATA: -; ICAO: MX11; LID: BBS

Summary
- Serves: Campo René
- Location: Mulegé Municipality, Baja California Sur state, Mexico
- Coordinates: 26°48′20″N 113°28′35″W
- Interactive map of Bahía Ballenas Airstrip

Runways
Direction	Length		Surface
Direction	ft	m	Surface
08/26	4,518	1,377	Soil

Bahía Ballenas Airstrip (IATA: N/A) is a dirt airstrip located in Campo René, Municipality of Mulegé, Baja California Sur, Mexico,

Campo René is a camp located on the Ballenas Bay (Bahía Ballenas), on the Pacific Ocean coast, just on the entrance of Estero "El Coyote", to the East of Punta Abreojos.

The airstrip is used solely for general aviation purposes. The BBS code is used as identifier. The airstrip is operated by "Campo René Cabañas", telephone numbers 7-00-72 and fax 7–04–77.
