= Mario Valenzuela =

Mexican baseball player

- Outfielder
- Born: March 10, 1977 (age 48); Isla San Marcos, Baja California Sur, Mexico
- Bats: Right Throws: Right
- Stats at Baseball Reference

Mario Valenzuela Osuna (born March 10, 1977) is a former professional baseball outfielder.

== Career ==
Valenzuela played for the Chicago White Sox minor league affiliates, beginning in 1996 at the age of 19 by playing in the Rookie League and eventually achieving Triple-A level in 2004.

In the Mexican Baseball League, Valenzuela played for the Saraperos de Saltillo (2005 - 2008), the Diablos Rojos del México (2009 - 2014), and the Guerreros de Oaxaca (2014 - 2017).

In 2006, Valenzuela played for Team Mexico in the World Baseball Classic, finishing the tournament batting .250 with a home run and one run batted in.

For the 2009 World Baseball Classic edition, he joined Team Mexico as a replacement player for the injured Erubiel Durazo, going hitless in four at bats.

Valenzuela officially retired from professional baseball on January 26, 2018.
