= Roca Consag =

- Interactive map of Roca Consag
- Coordinates: 31°07′00″N 114°29′00″W

Roca Consag (Consag Rock) is a granitic (or more precisely, dacitic) outcrop located in the northern Gulf of California about 22 miles ENE of the town of San Felipe. The outcrop stands about 286 feet above the sea, and is named for the Croatian Jesuit missionary Ferdinand Konščak who was active in the early exploration and missionary work in Baja California. The ruins of an abandoned lighthouse can be seen on the west side of the outcrop. The waters in the vicinity of the Roca Consag are a popular fishing area and also favored for spotting whales and porpoises.
