= San Marcos, Baja California Sur =

Island in Baja California Sur, Mexico

San Marcos
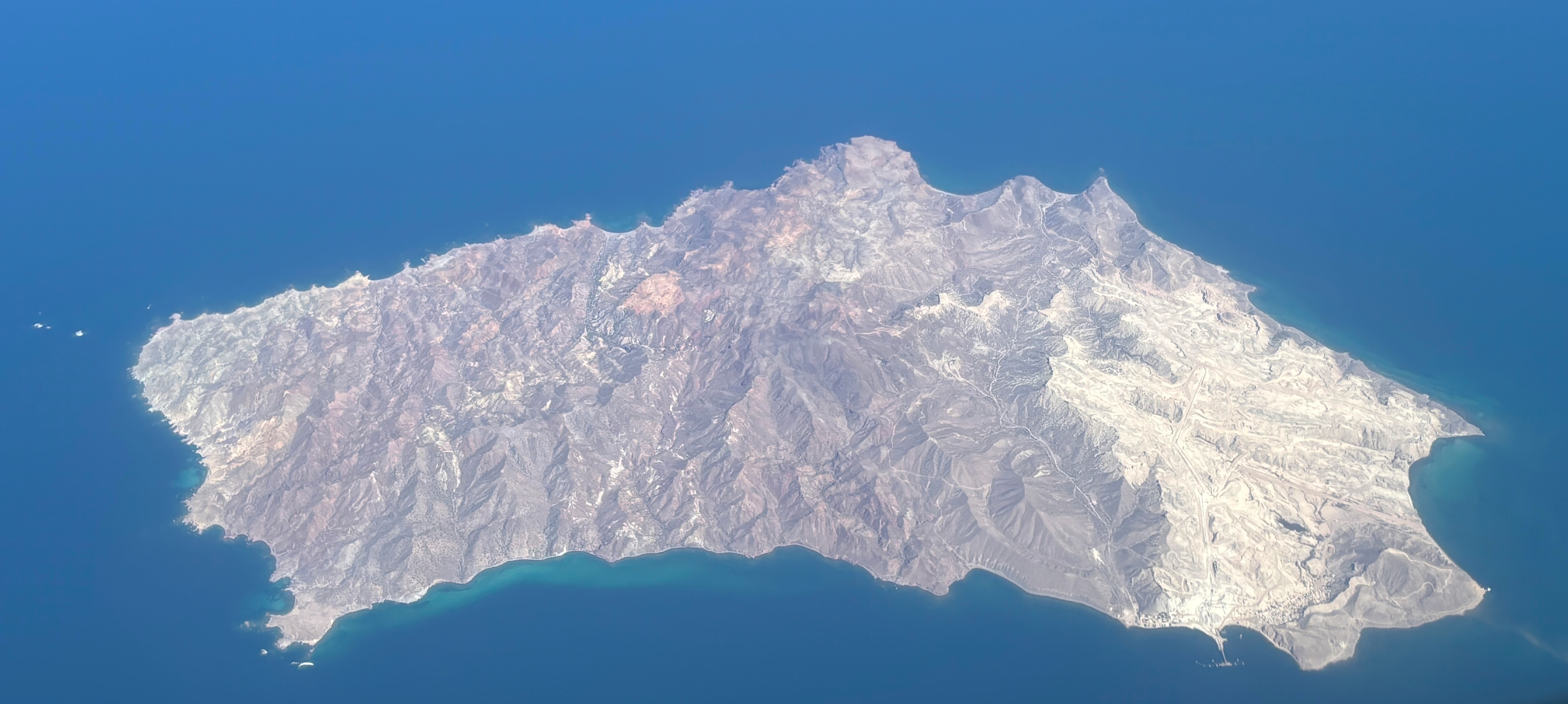
- Aerial photo of San Marcos Island (2024)

- Location within Baja California Sur

Geography
- Location: Gulf of California
- Coordinates: 27°12′43″N 112°04′25″W
- Area: 28.748 km^{2} (11.100 sq mi)

Administration
- Mexico
- State: Baja California Sur
- Municipality: Mulegé

Demographics
- Population: 425 (2005)

San Marcos is an island located in the northern portion of Baja California Sur, México. It faces the town of Santa Rosalía on the Gulf of California near Isla Tortuga. The only town on the island is also named San Marcos. The island has a land area of 28.748 km^{2} (11.100 sq mi), the 18th-largest island in Mexico. Its population as of the 2005 census was 425 inhabitants. It is part of the Mulegé Municipality.

== Geography ==
San Marcos is located at 27°12′43″N 112°04′25″W.

== Access ==
A 1,125 meter long private-use dirt airstrip is located on the South coast of Isla San Marcos. Small boats located in San Bruno ferry people to the island, and back from the island

== Attractions ==
Fishing is the main attraction, being roughly in the middle of the Gulf of California.

== World War 2 ==
During World War II the area was heavily mined for gypsum which had many uses in the war.

== Notable people ==
- Rodolfo Garayzar Anaya, politician and trade unionist
- Mario Valenzuela, baseball player
