= Rodolfo Garayzar Anaya =

Mexican politician

Member of the Congress of Baja California Sur from the 14th district
- In office 15 March 2002 – 14 March 2005
- Preceded by: Pedro Graciano Osuna López
- Succeeded by: Carolina Madrigal Higuera

Personal details
- Born: August 1951 San Marcos, Baja California Sur, Mexico
- Died: 2018 (aged 66–67) Guerrero Negro, Baja California Sur, Mexico
- Party: PRI
- Spouse: Rosa Isela Ramírez Villegas

Rodolfo Garayzar Anaya (August 1951 – 2018) was a Mexican politician and trade unionist. He served in the X Legislature of the Congress of Baja California Sur from 2002 to 2005 as a member of the Institutional Revolutionary Party (PRI).

== Biography ==
Garayzar was born in San Marcos, Baja California Sur in August 1951. He worked for Exportadora de Sal S.A. (ESSA), a salt production company headquartered in the nearby town of Guerrero Negro, and rose the ranks of the ESSA workers' union, the Sindicato Salinero, which formed a part of the Confederación Revolucionaria de Obreros y Campesinos (CROC). Garayzar reached the position of union leader and was well-respected for his defense of workers' rights. Garayzar served in the role from 1997 to 1999.

In the 2002 elections, Garayzar won a seat representing the 14th district in the X Legislature of the Congress of Baja California Sur as a member of the Institutional Revolutionary Party (PRI). He served his full three-year term in the state congress.

Garayzar died in Guerrero Negro in late 2018; he was survived by his wife, Rosa Isela, as well as his daughter, Beatriz. Garayzar was honored at a session of the state congress a few days afterward.
