= Isla Pitahaya, Baja California Sur =

Isla Pitahaya
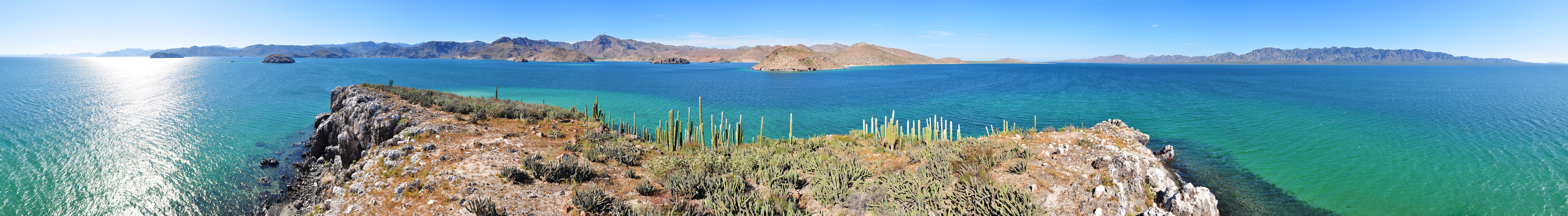
- View from atop the lighthouse of Isla Pitahaya in Bahía Concepción, Baja California Sur.

- Location within Mexico

Geography
- Location: Gulf of California
- Coordinates: 26.75161°N 111.872284°W

Administration
- Mexico

Isla Pitahaya is an island in Bahía Concepción near Playa Santispac, in Baja California Sur. The island's name is derived from the fact that the island has many tall pitahaya cacti that are clearly observable from afar. Isla Pitahaya also has a lighthouse. The southwest shore has a small white, sandy beach while the rest of the island is rocky. The island is about 1.5 miles (2.4 km) from Playa Santispac and 0.5 miles (0.80 km) from the nearest mainland shore.
