= El Gallito Airstrip =

- IATA: none; ICAO: MX76; LID: GLL

Summary
- Airport type: Private
- Operator: Hotel Serenidad
- Serves: Mulegé
- Location: Mulegé Municipality, Baja California Sur, Mexico
- Elevation AMSL: 33 ft / 10 m
- Coordinates: 26°53′40″N 111°57′21″W
- Interactive map of El Gallito Airstrip

Runways
Direction	Length		Surface
Direction	ft	m	Surface
16/34	3,635	1,108	Soil

El Gallito Airstrip (IATA: N/A) is a privately owned public-use dirt airstrip at Hotel Serenidad, located 2 miles south of Mulegé, Municipality of Mulegé, Baja California Sur, Mexico, just on the Gulf of California coast. The airstrip is used solely for general aviation purposes.
