= Rock Paintings of Sierra de San Francisco =

Prehistoric rock art pictographs in Baja California Sur, Mexico

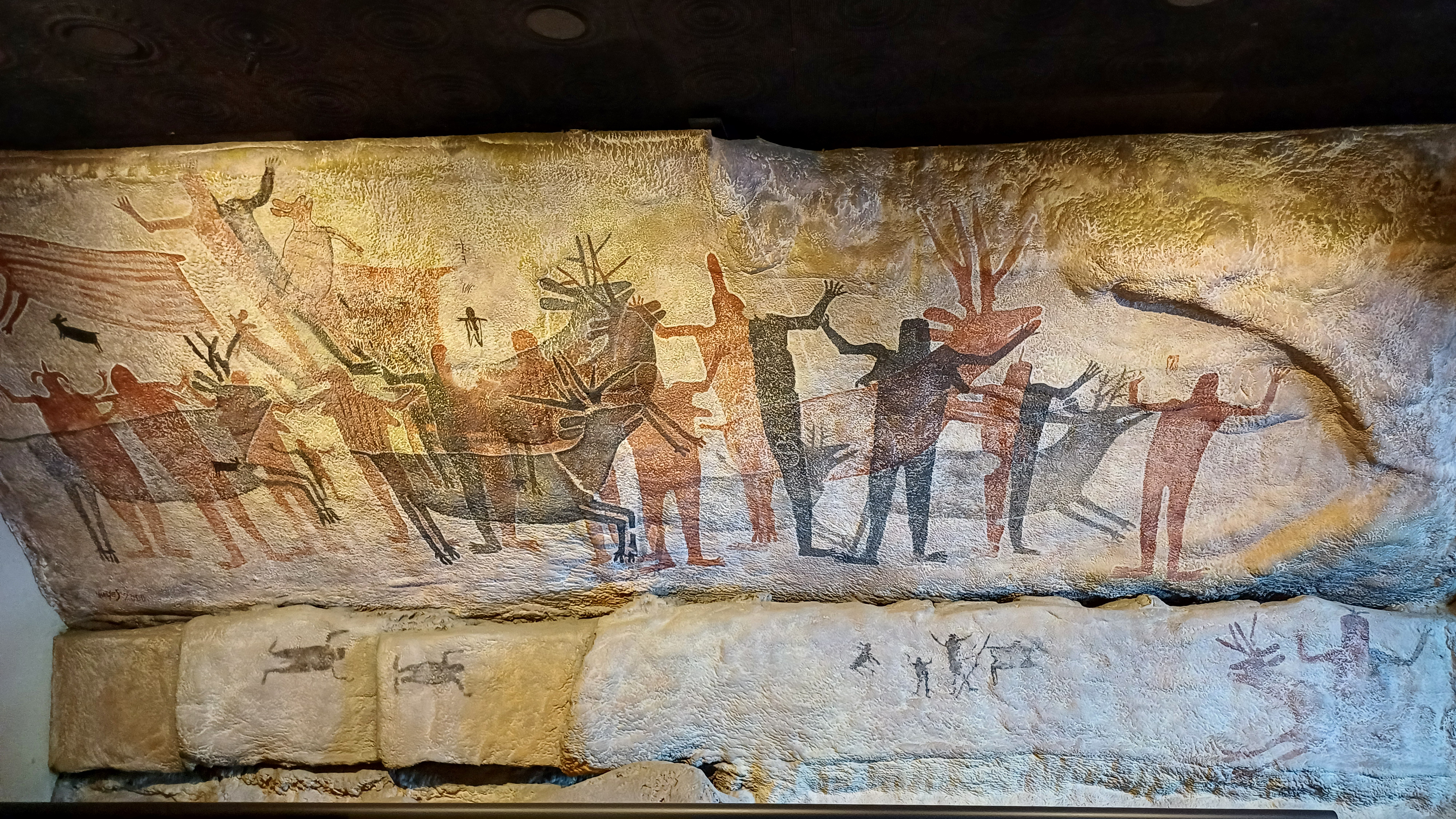
- Replica of rock paintings of the Sierra de San Francisco at the Museo Nacional de Antropología

- Location within Mexico
- 27.6555611°N 112.91611°W
- Location: Sierra de San Francisco, Mulegé Municipality, Baja California Sur, Mexico

UNESCO World Heritage Site
- Official name: Rock Paintings of the Sierra de San Francisco
- Type: Cultural
- Criteria: i, iii
- Designated: 1993 (17th session)
- Reference no.: 714
- Region: Latin America and the Caribbean

The Rock Paintings of Sierra de San Francisco are prehistoric rock art pictographs found in the Sierra de San Francisco mountain range in Mulegé Municipality of the northern region of Baja California Sur state, in Mexico.

== History ==
The pictographs are likely the artistic products of the Cochimi people in the Baja California peninsula. This group became culturally extinct in the nineteenth century but is comparatively well known through the writings of eighteenth-century Jesuit missionaries. These paintings on the roofs and walls of rock shelters in the Sierra de San Francisco were first discovered by Europeans in the eighteenth century by the Mexican Jesuit missionary José Mariano Rotea.

According to some native beliefs recorded by the Jesuits and others, the paintings were drawn by a race of giants—a supposition that has been discarded by scientific investigators since the late nineteenth century. This belief may have been suggested by the larger-than-life size of many of the human (as well as animal) figures. Some observers have speculated that the paintings had meanings relating to hunting magic, religious practices, or ancestor worship, but there is no consensus on these interpretations. Animal species including deer, wild sheep, rabbit, puma, lynx, whale, turtle, fish, and birds are depicted. There are also abstract elements of various forms. A growing body of radiocarbon dates relating to the paintings has suggested ages from as early as 5500 BCE to as late as European contact in the eighteenth century.

== Geography ==
The pictographs are at around 250 sites, which are located east of the El Vizcaino Biosphere Reserve. Access to the paintings is difficult due to the isolated location, which also has helped to minimize vandalism and destruction of the out cropping.

=== Landmark ===
The area has one of the largest concentrations of Pre-Columbian art on the Baja California Peninsula. It is known for the high quality, extent, variety and originality of human and animal representations, remarkable colors, and excellent state of preservation.

In 1989 the rock paintings of Sierra de San Francisco were nominated for, and in 1993 became, a World Heritage Site.

== See also ==
- Great Mural Rock Art, Baja California
