= Punta San Pedro Airstrip =

- IATA: none; ICAO: none

Summary
- Airport type: Public, General aviation
- Serves: Mulegé
- Location: Mulegé Municipality, Baja California Sur, Mexico
- Elevation AMSL: 75 ft / 23 m
- Coordinates: 26°49′05″N 111°53′01″W
- Interactive map of Punta San Pedro Airstrip

Runways
Direction	Length		Surface
Direction	ft	m	Surface
16/34	2,700	823	Soil

Punta San Pedro Airstrip or Bahía Concepción Airstrip (IATA: N/A) is a dirt airstrip in Municipality of Mulegé, Baja California Sur state, Mexico.

It is located 8 miles (13 km) south of Mulegé on Mexican Federal Highway 1, in the Bahía Concepción area.

The airstrip is used solely for general aviation purposes.

== See also ==
- Airports in Baja California Sur
