= Isla San Marcos Airstrip =

- IATA: none; ICAO: none

Summary
- Airport type: Private
- Operator: Compañía Occidental Mexicana SA de CV
- Serves: San Marcos
- Location: Mulegé Municipality, Baja California Sur state, Mexicor
- Elevation AMSL: 134 ft / 41 m
- Coordinates: 27°11′15″N 112°04′12″W
- Interactive map of Isla San Marcos Airstrip

Runways
Direction	Length		Surface
Direction	ft	m	Surface
18/36	3,690	1,125	Soil

Isla San Marcos Airstrip (IATA: N/A) is a private-use dirt airstrip located on the South coast of Isla San Marcos, Baja California Sur, Mexico, an island located in the Gulf of California.

It is located 10 miles southeast of Santa Rosalía, Municipality of Mulegé.

The airstrip is handled by "Compañía Occidental Mexicana S.A de C.V.", a mining company that exploits the gypsum deposits that exist on the island.

The airstrip handles national air traffic for the town of San Marcos, the community where the mining company workers and their families live. The airstrip is private-use only, so permission is needed before landing.
