= Todos Santos Airstrip =

- IATA: none; ICAO: none

Summary
- Airport type: Private
- Location: Todos Santos
- Elevation AMSL: 432 ft / 132 m
- Coordinates: 23°29′54″N 110°12′07″W
- Interactive map of Todos Santos Airstrip

Runways
Direction	Length		Surface
Direction	ft	m	Surface
02/20	4,062	1,238	Soil

Todos Santos Airstrip (IATA: N/A) is a private-use dirt airstrip located 4 miles east of Todos Santos, Municipality of La Paz, Baja California Sur, Mexico, a town located near the Pacific Ocean coast. Permission must be given before landing (the runway is closed with obstacles).
