= Misión San Ignacio Kadakaamán =

Spanish mission in San Ignacio, Baja California Sur, Mexico

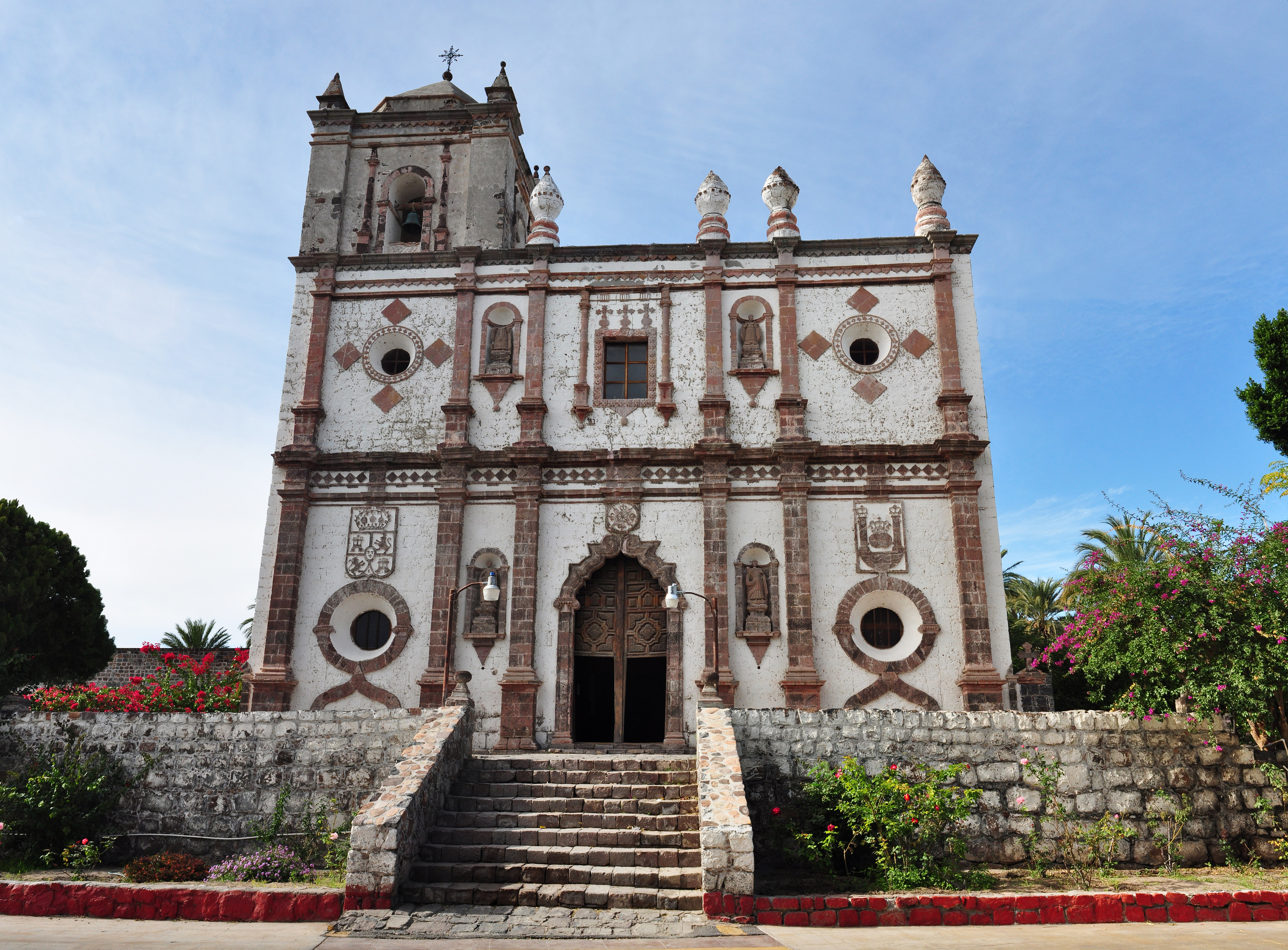
- The front facade of Misión San Ignacio

- Location in Baja California Sur Location in Mexico
- Location: San Ignacio, Baja California Sur, Mexico
- Coordinates: 27°17′02″N 112°53′55″W
- Name as founded: Misión San Ignacio Kadakaamán
- Patron: Ignatius of Loyola
- Founded: 1728
- Founding Order: Jesuit
- Native tribe: Cochimí

Mission San Ignacio Kadakaaman (Spanish: Misión San Ignacio Kadakaamán) was founded by the Jesuit missionary Juan Bautista de Luyando in 1728 at the site of the modern town of San Ignacio, Baja California Sur, Mexico.

== History ==
The site for the future mission was discovered in 1706 by Francisco María Piccolo at the palm-lined Cochimí oasis of Kadakaamán ("arroyo of the reeds"). The site proved to be a highly productive one agriculturally, and served as the base for later Jesuit expansion in the central peninsula. The impressive surviving church was constructed by the Dominican missionary Juan Gómez in 1786. The mission was finally abandoned in 1840.

A statue of St. Martin de Porres, ‘saint of the broom’ adorns the sanctuary wall.

== See also ==
- Spanish missions in Baja California
- Spanish missions in California
- Ferdinand Konščak
- List of Jesuit sites
