= Mulegé =

- City
- Heroica Mulegé
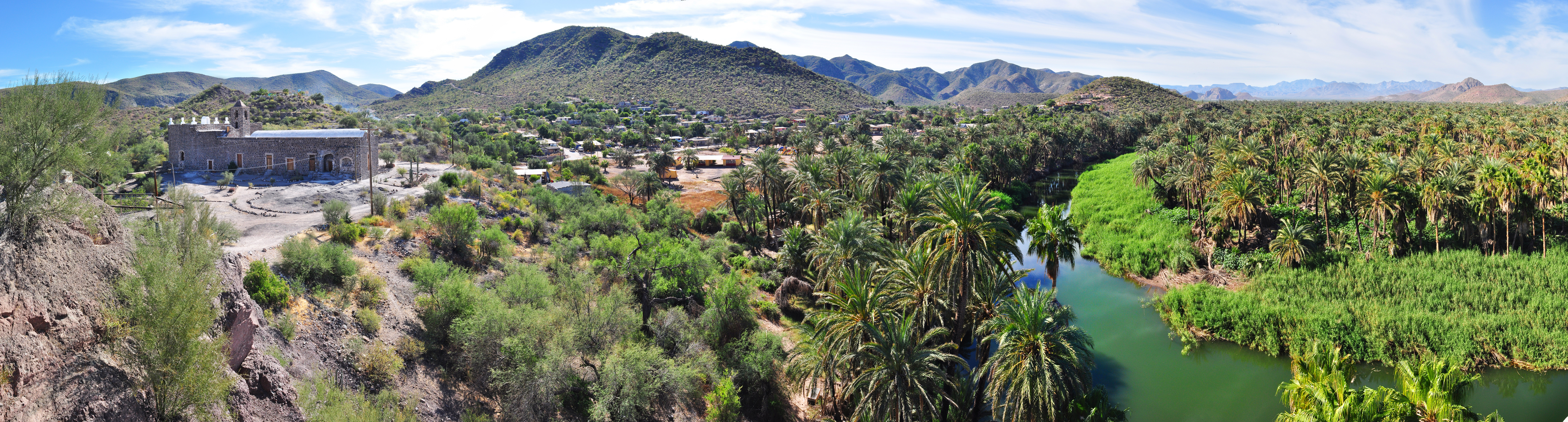
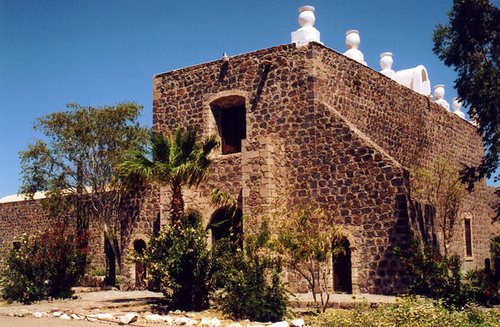
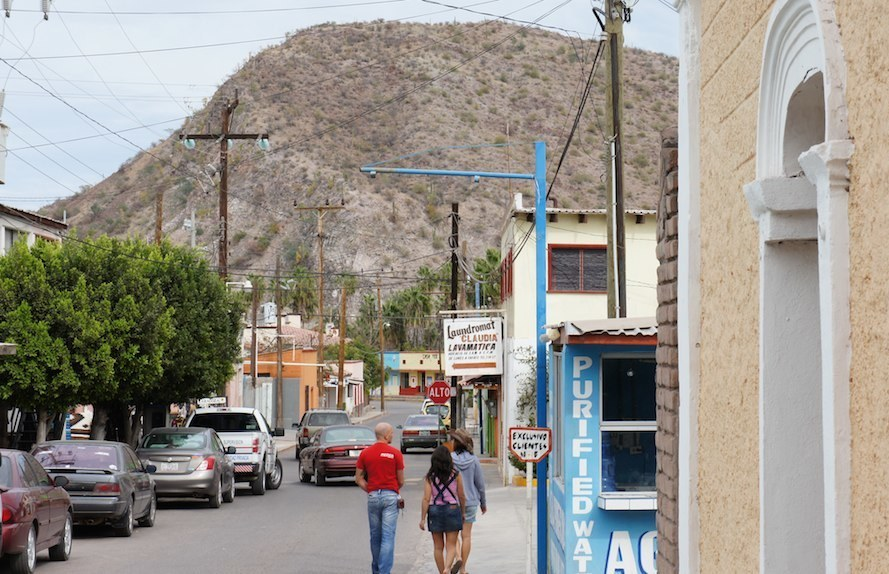
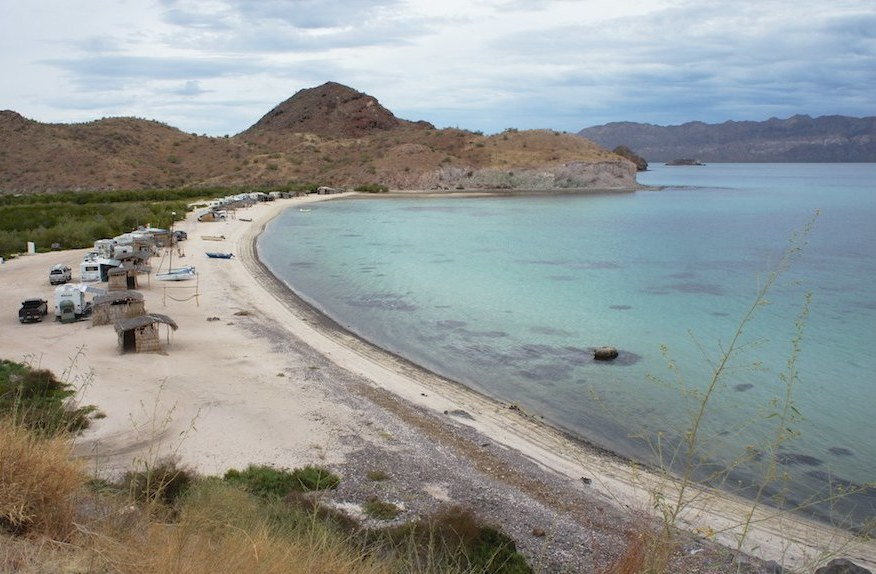
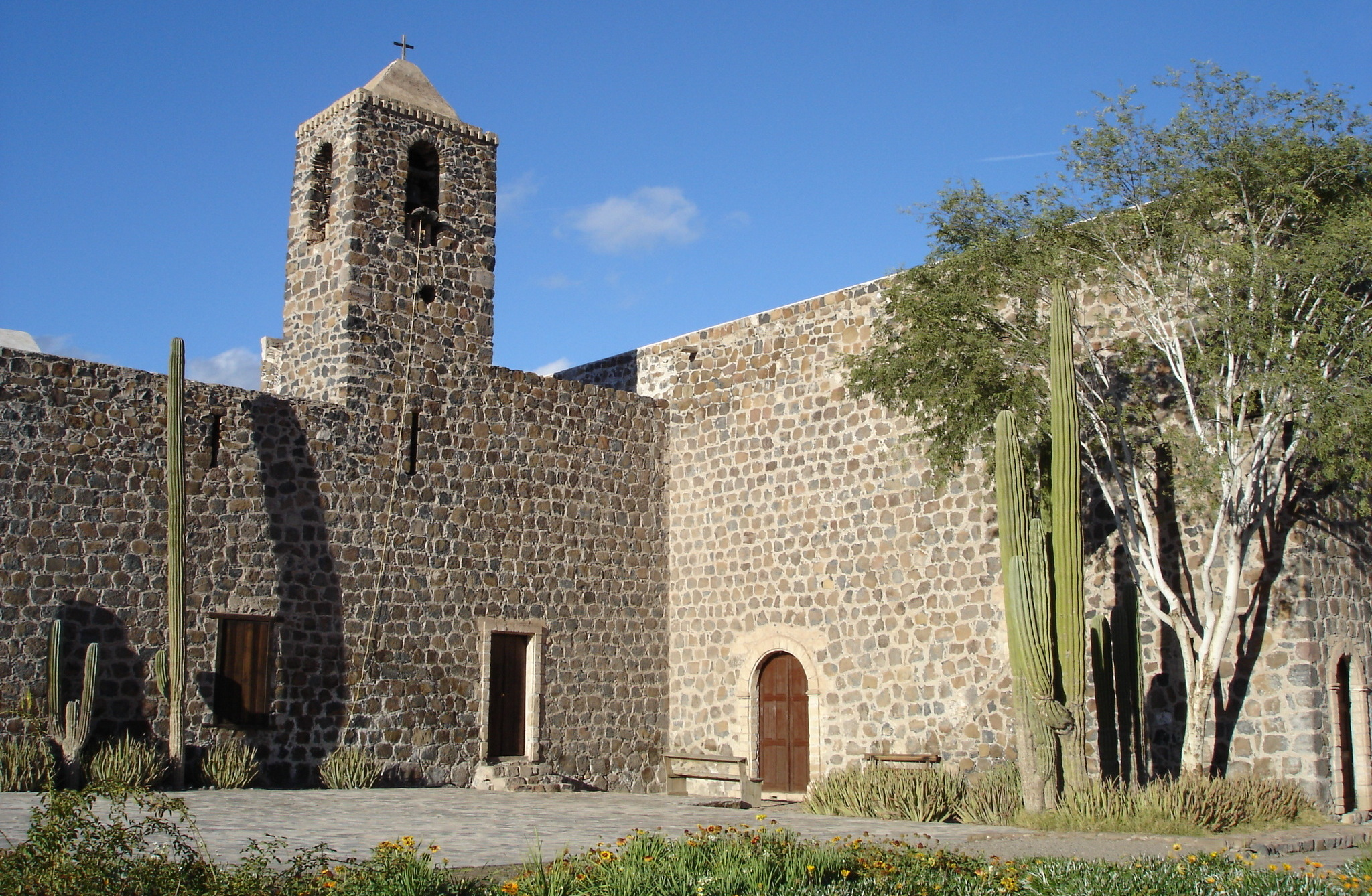
- Top: Mulegé oasis; middle: Mission Santa Rosalía de Mulegé (left) and downtown (right); bottom: Bahía Concepción (left) and Misión Santa Rosalía de Mulegé, lateral facade (right).

- Location in Mexico Mulegé (Mexico)
- Coordinates: 26°53′30″N 111°58′51″W
- Country: Mexico
- State: Baja California Sur
- Municipality: Mulegé
- Elevation: 52 ft (16 m)

Population (2020)
  - Total: 3,834
- Time zone: UTC-7 (Pacific (US Mountain))
  - Summer (DST): UTC-6 (Pacific)

Mulegé is a city in Mulegé Municipality, Baja California Sur, situated on the Gulf of California. Located on the Gulf of California, the population was 3,834 according to the 2020 INEGI census.

== History ==
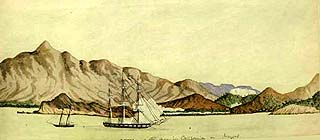
The Battle of Mulegé in 1847.

Indigenous peoples have lived in this area for thousands of years due to the abundance of water in the river valley. Extensive ancient cave paintings can be found in the nearby Sierra de Guadalupe mountains.

In 1702, Jesuit Father Juan Maria de Salvatierra identified the valley of today's Mulegé as a place for a mission to the Indians. It was not until 1754 that Father Francisco Escalante started the construction of the mission, called Misión Santa Rosalía de Mulegé. Years later, many other Jesuit fathers came into today's area of Mulegé to bring the Catholic faith and convert the natives to Catholicism.

The official name of the town is "Heroica Mulegé." This title is based on incidents during the Mexican-American War of 1846–1848. The Americans tried to occupy long stretches of the Pacific coast such as California, Baja California, and New Mexico – all of which were then part of Mexico. The people of Mulegé and surrounding settlements along the Pacific coastline defeated the Americans. As a result, Mulegé was not occupied and was rewarded the official title "Heroica Mulegé" by the national legislature.

The old prison is famed for not having bars. The prisoners could freely walk around town and establish or maintain families here. They just had to return to the prison in the evening. Escapes were rare because of the remoteness of Mulegé. Until Mex 1 was paved, the area was surrounded by harsh desert for many miles. All prisoners had to agree to assist in tracking escapees and assist in their capture. Today, the old prison is operated as a museum.

== Geography ==
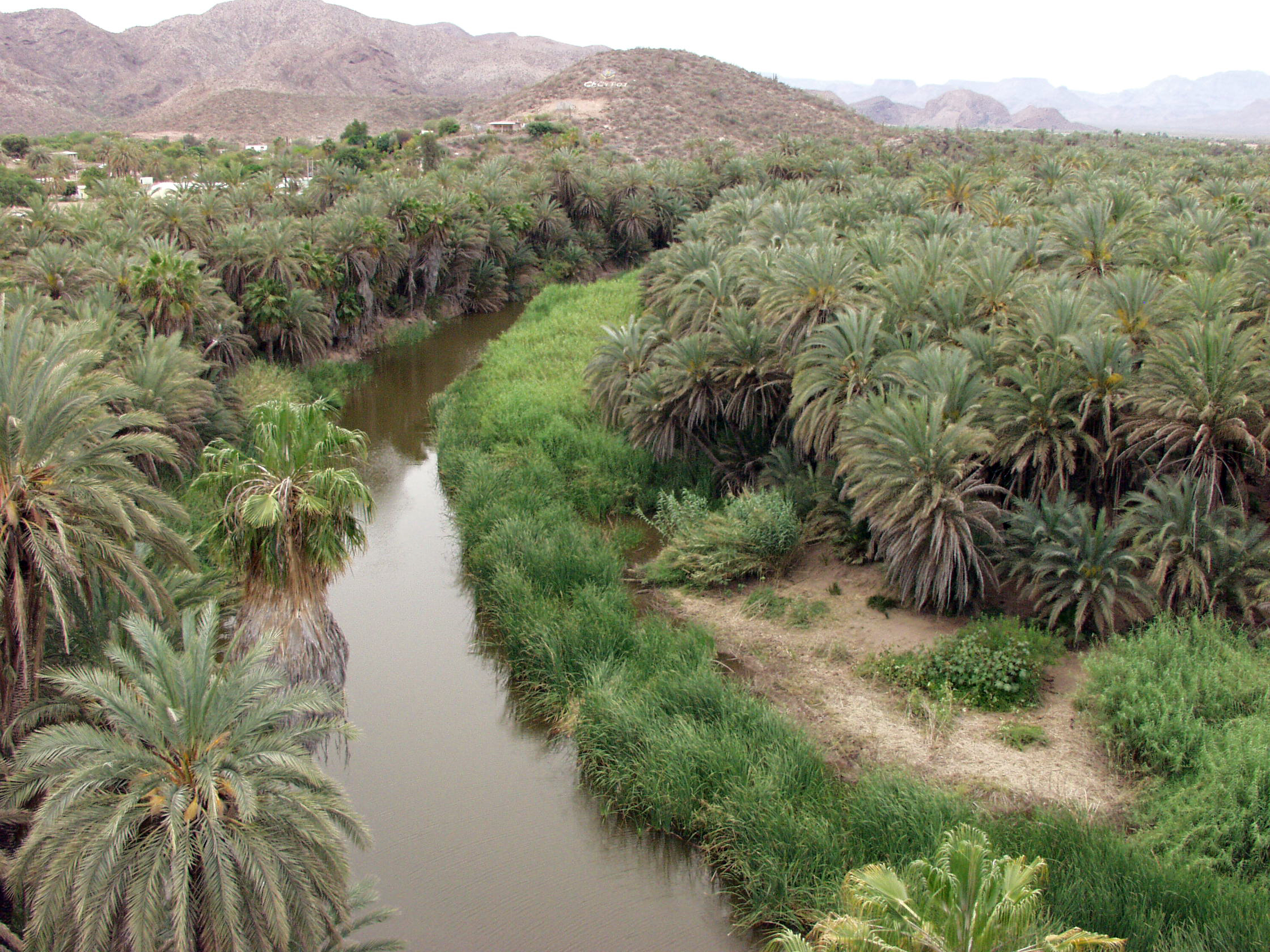
Palm oasis in Mulegé.

The entire peninsula of Baja California is an area with one of the lowest precipitation rates in the world. Rain is rare but usually occurs between December and March, and hurricanes are occasionally a major threat to the Mulegé area. There is a saying in Baja California: "It never rains in Baja, but if it rains, it pours."

Due to fertile soil and a rich water supply in the Mulegé river valley, irrigation has supported agriculture in this area as a strong part of the economy, unlike other areas of Baja California. Tropical fruits are cultivated, including oranges, bananas, limes, and mangoes.

== Economy ==
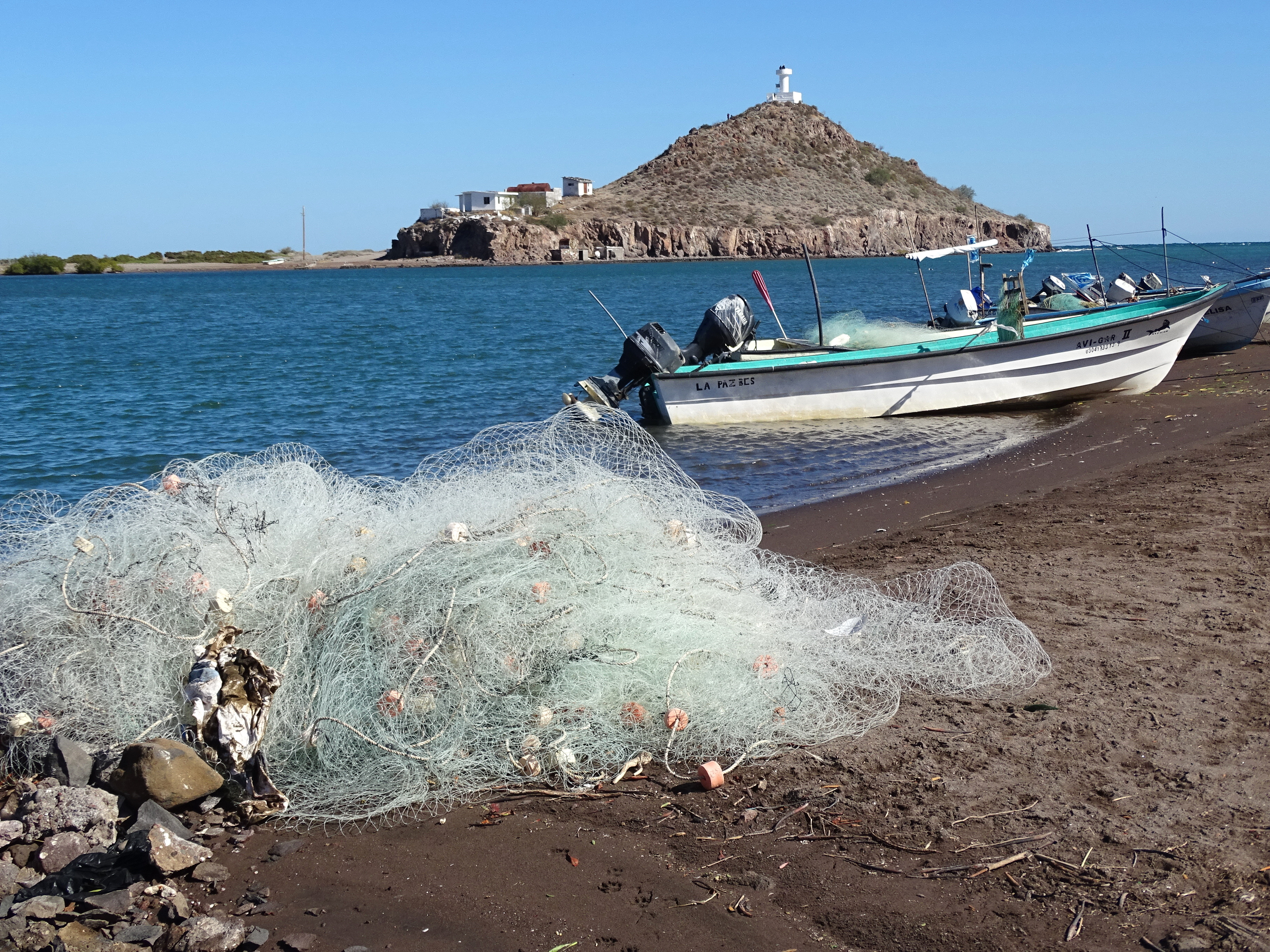
Fishing boats on the shores of the Gulf of California.

Mulegé is internationally famous for its rich fishing grounds in the Gulf of California. A warm current from the southern and a cold current from the northern Pacific come together in the Mulegé area of the Gulf of California and encourage a great variety of different fish species. The Gulf is sometimes known as the "Sea of Cortez", after the Spanish explorer, Hernán Cortés, who sailed into the area.

In the past, Mulegé's economy was largely based on fishing and farming. Today, tourism is a major income source for Mulegé. Some come for the area's deep sea fishing. Kayaking, cave tours, bird watching, and fishing, with or without charters to catch a big game fish, are popular attractions.

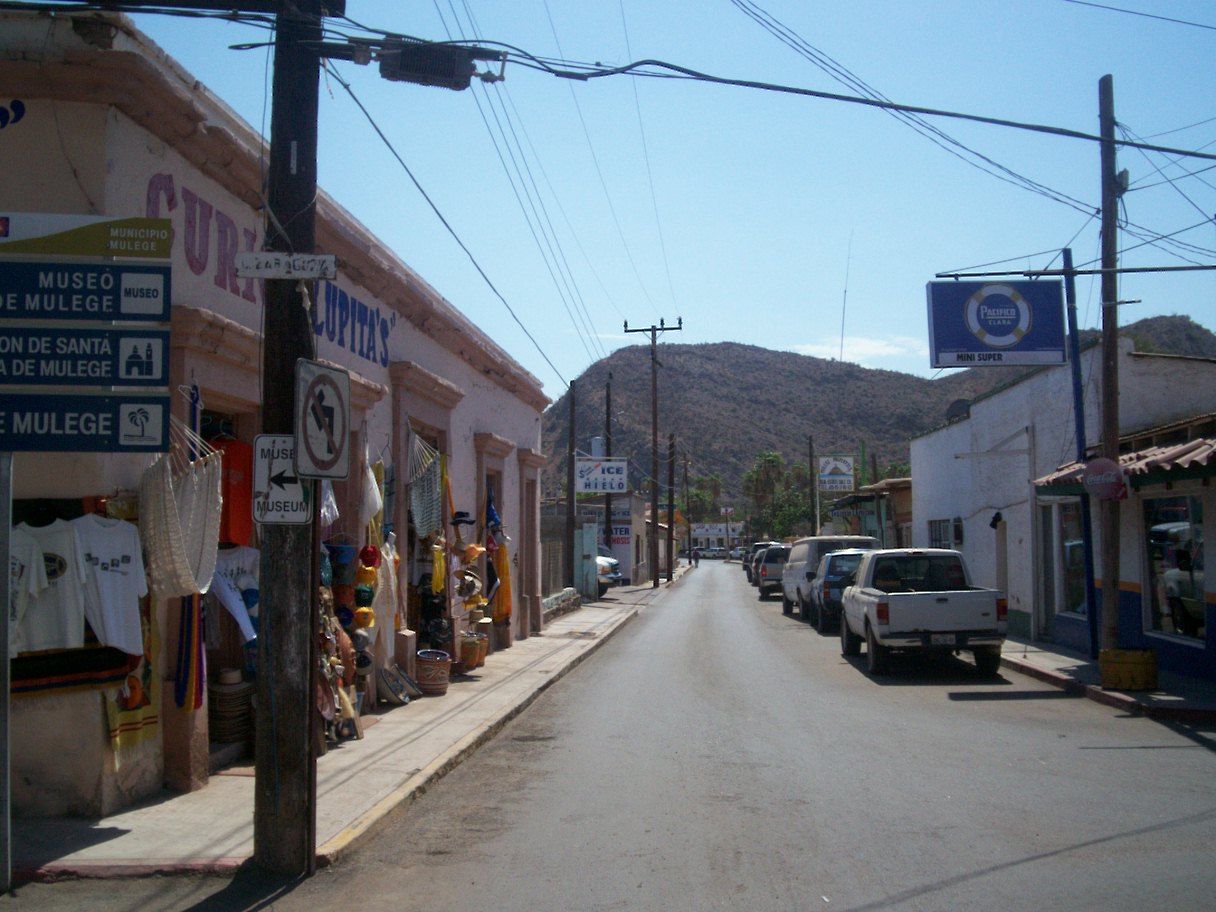
Street in Mulegé.

Today's tourism industry in Mulegé is based on the fact that in 1976 the Highway MX 1 – a paved road – was constructed and Mulegé became easily accessible by land. A trip from the US border to Mulegé takes no more than 12 hours today. Before the highway was constructed, such a trip could take four days.

The area has suffered damage from Hurricane John in 2006, Tropical Storm Julio in 2008, Hurricane Jimena in 2009, Hurricane Paul in 2012, and Hurricane Odile in 2014. All five hurricanes created major precipitation followed by high floods. All over the Mulegé area, from the Pacific to the Gulf of California, rainfall and floods were devastating. Mulegé was flooded by over 20 feet of water at the highway bridge and by 6 feet in the upper regions of town. Many homes located in the river valley were washed into the Gulf of California. Clean-up was still being done in January 2015.

== Transportation ==
By land, Mulegé is accessible by Federal Highway 1, which runs from Tijuana at the US-Mexico border to Cabo San Lucas.

Mulegé is served by three airstrips in the area, which are used for private air travel: El Gallito Airstrip, Mulegé Airstrip, and Punta San Pedro Airstrip. Regional flights are available at the Palo Verde Airport (to the north of town), and international flights are available at the Loreto Airport (123 km to the south).
