= Sierra de Guadalupe cave paintings =

Coordinates: 27.626963°N 113.020427°W

Painting including a dead deer, a shaman like figure, fish and hand prints

The Trinidad Deer, ocher paint on rock wall

The Sierra de Guadalupe cave paintings are a series of prehistoric rock art pictographs near Rancho La Trinidad, Mulegé in Baja California Sur, Mexico. The Sierra de Guadalupe, mountains west of Mulegé, contains the largest number of known prehistoric rock art sites in Baja California.

They form part of Central Baja California's 'great mural tradition' and are protected by Mexican law. The largest of several rock walls features the 'Trinidad deer', one of the best deer paintings in Baja California. The area also includes images of shamanistic figures, fish (including perhaps the only fish skeleton in Baja California) and other marine creatures, hand prints and female genitals.

The UNESCO World Heritage list includes the rock paintings of the Sierra San Francisco, including the Guadalupe paintings. The paintings are attributed to a group of people who lived in the area from 100 BC to 1300 AD. They are remarkably well preserved because of the dryness of the climate and the inaccessibility of the sites.

The most highly developed pre-Hispanic group in the region was that of a people known as the Guachimis, who were probably responsible for much of the cave paintings. Their territory extended from San Javier and La Purisima in the south of the reserve to the extreme northern end of the Baja California peninsula. Little is known about this group, apart from the fact that they probably originally came from further north.
