= Puerto Adolfo López Mateos Airstrip =

- IATA: none; ICAO: MX72; LID: MTB

Summary
- Airport type: Public
- Location: Puerto Adolfo López Mateos
- Elevation AMSL: 6 ft / 2 m
- Coordinates: 25°11′49″N 112°06′48″W
- Interactive map of Puerto Adolfo López Mateos Airstrip

Runways
Direction	Length		Surface
Direction	ft	m	Surface
11/29	4,450	1,356	Soil

Puerto Adolfo López Mateos Airfield (IATA: MX72) is a private dirt airstrip located in Puerto Adolfo López Mateos, Municipality of Comondú, Baja California Sur, Mexico, a fishing town located on the Magdalena Bay coast, a bay known for whale watching activities.

The airstrip, privately owned, maintained and operated, is open to the public for daytime general aviation use, and used monthly by the Phoenix Los Amigos Chapter of the Flying Samaritans, who have conducted free clinics adjacent to the airstrip.
