= Palo Blanco Airstrip =

- IATA: -; ICAO: MX64; LID: ENW

Summary
- Airport type: Private
- Location: La Purísima, Baja California Sur
- Elevation AMSL: 819 ft / 249 m
- Coordinates: 26°08′54″N 112°06′24″W
- Interactive map of Palo Blanco Airstrip

Runways
Direction	Length		Surface
Direction	ft	m	Surface
07/25	3,382	1,030	Soil

Palo Blanco Airstrip (IATA: N/A) is a private dirt airstrip located 6 km south of La Purísima, Municipality of Comondú, Baja California Sur, Mexico. It is used solely for general aviation purposes. The ENW code is an identifier designated by the Direction General of Civil Aeronautics (DGAC) and can be used to file Mexican flight plans.
