= Palo Verde Airport =

Palo Verde Airport Aeropuerto Nacional Palo Verde
- IATA: SRL; ICAO: none; LID: CIB

Summary
- Airport type: Public
- Serves: Santa Rosalía
- Location: Mulegé Municipality, Baja California Sur, Mexico
- Elevation AMSL: 55 ft / 17 m
- Coordinates: 27°05′35″N 112°05′56″W

Map
- Location of airport in Baja California Sur SRL (Mexico)

Runways
| Direction | Length | | Surface |
| Direction | ft | m | Surface |
|---|---|---|---|
| 14/32 | 5,681 | 1,731 | Asphalt |

Statistics (2023)
- Total passengers: N/A
- Source: Agencia Federal de Aviación Civil

Palo Verde Airport (IATA: SRL) is a paved airstrip located in San Bruno, a town 30 km south of Santa Rosalía, Baja California Sur, Mexico. The airstrip is also known as "Chivato Bay" and the CIB code is used as its identifier. It handles aviation for the city of Santa Rosalía.
