= San Ignacio, Baja California Sur =

San Ignacio
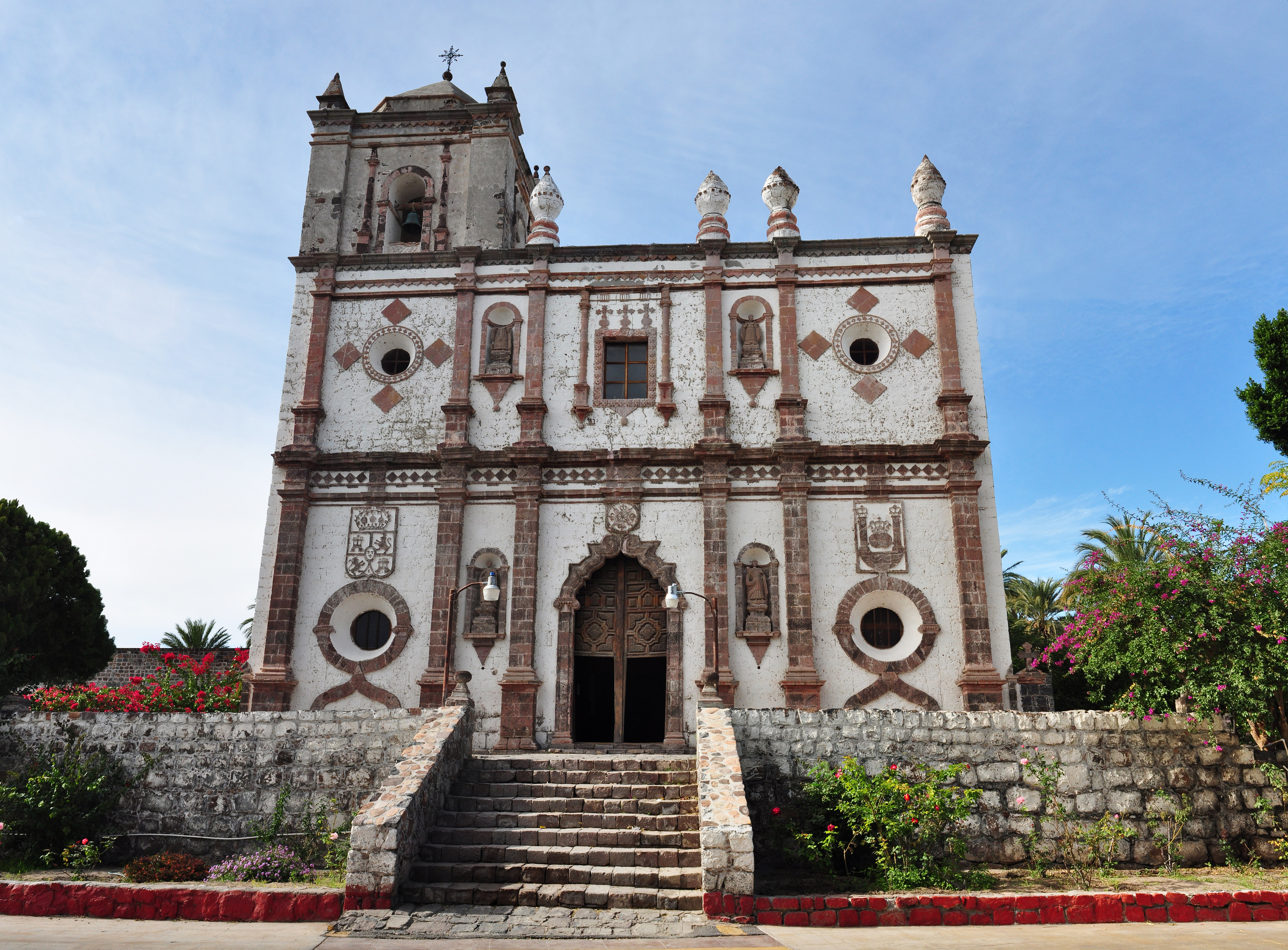
- Misión San Ignacio Kadakaamán

- Location in Mexico San Ignacio (Mexico)
- Coordinates: 27°16′56″N 112°53′40″W
- Country: Mexico
- State: Baja California Sur
- Municipality: Mulegé
- Elevation: 400 ft (122 m)

Population (2020)
  - City: 521
  - Urban: 0

San Ignacio is a town in Mulegé Municipality, Baja California Sur. The town had a 2020 census population of 521.

== History ==
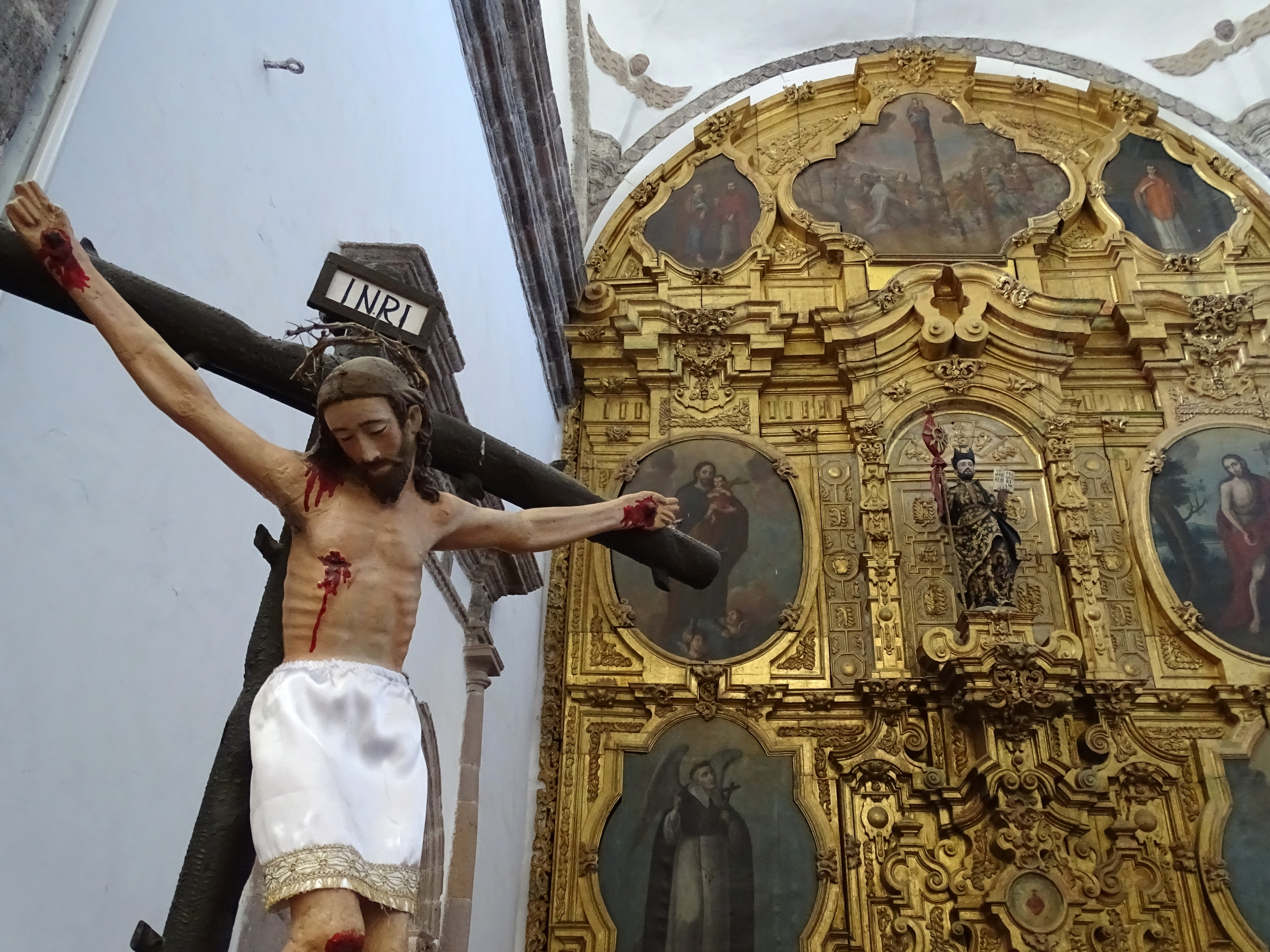
Interior of Misión San Ignacio Kadakaamán, founded in 1728.

San Ignacio grew at the site of the Cochimí settlement of Kadakaamán. The Jesuit Misión San Ignacio Kadakaamán was founded in 1728 by Fr. Juan Bautista Luyando.

== Geography ==
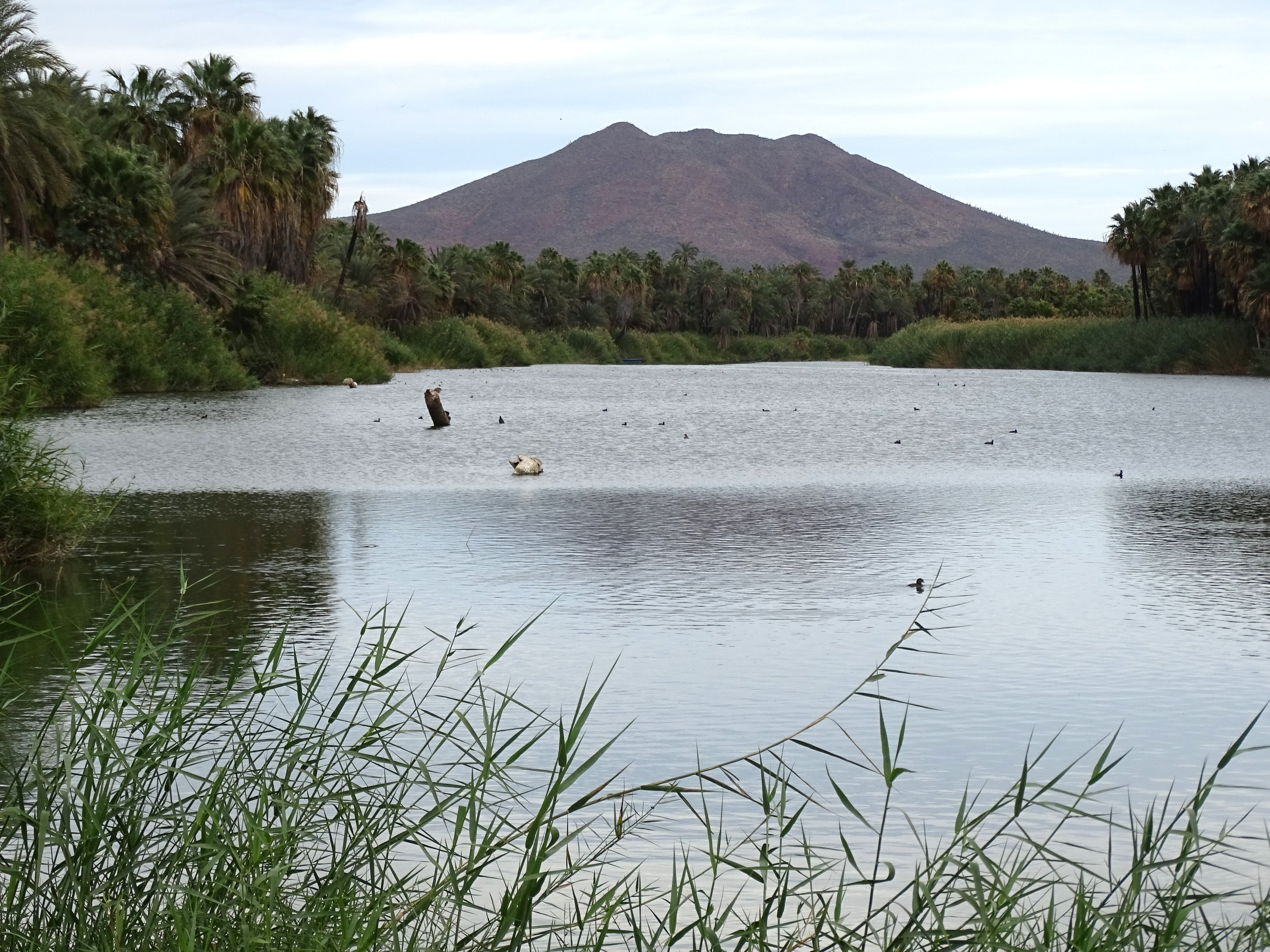
View of the palm oasis along the river in San Ignacio.

It is located on Mexican Federal Highway 1 between Guerrero Negro and Santa Rosalía.

One can travel on Mexican Federal Highway 1 by vehicle from Ensenada to arrive in San Ignacio. Highway 1 is a well-maintained, four-lane, toll highway from Tijuana to Ensenada. South of Ensenada, Highway 1 becomes a narrow (but relatively well-maintained) two-lane highway. Slow but steady progress is being made to support the tourism industry and Pemex gas stations are now located in every major town through which Highway 1 travels on the way to San Ignacio, both from the North and from the South. Driving only during daylight hours is recommended, due to livestock that frequently cross the road at night, and decreased visibility of the narrow and winding roads through the mountain sides.

The nearest airports are located to the north at Guerrero Negro Airport in Guerrero Negro, or to the south at Loreto International Airport in Loreto.

=== Geology ===
The locale has certain basaltic soils, providing clues as to the volcanic history of this region. There are a variety of desert flora and fauna in the vicinity of San Ignacio, notably including the elephant tree, (Bursera microphylla).

At San Ignacio, Baja California's arid Central Desert terrain gives way to a large grove of lush green date palms. A large spring-fed pond and small river on the outskirts of town feeds into the central plaza and village next to the eighteenth-century Jesuit mission. San Ignacio serves as the gateway to San Ignacio Lagoon, the winter time sanctuary of the Pacific gray whale.
