= Mulegé Municipality =

Municipality in the Mexican state of Baja California Sur

Coordinates: 27°15′N 113°15′W

Mulegé
- Municipality
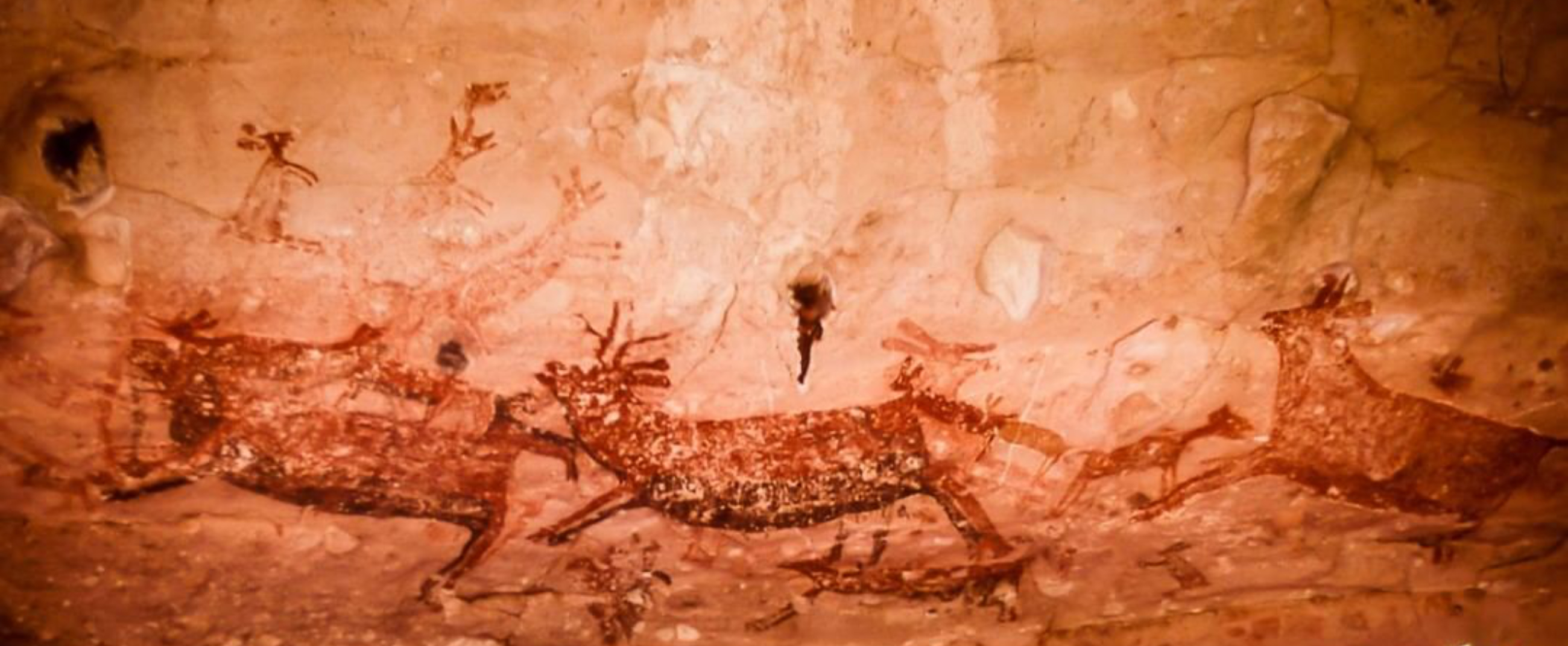
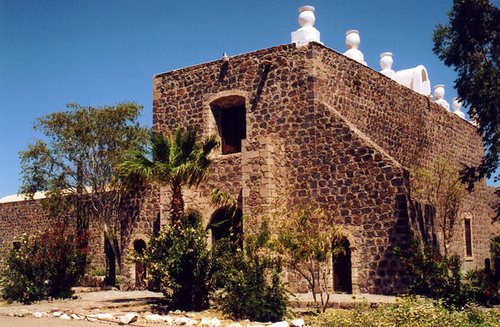
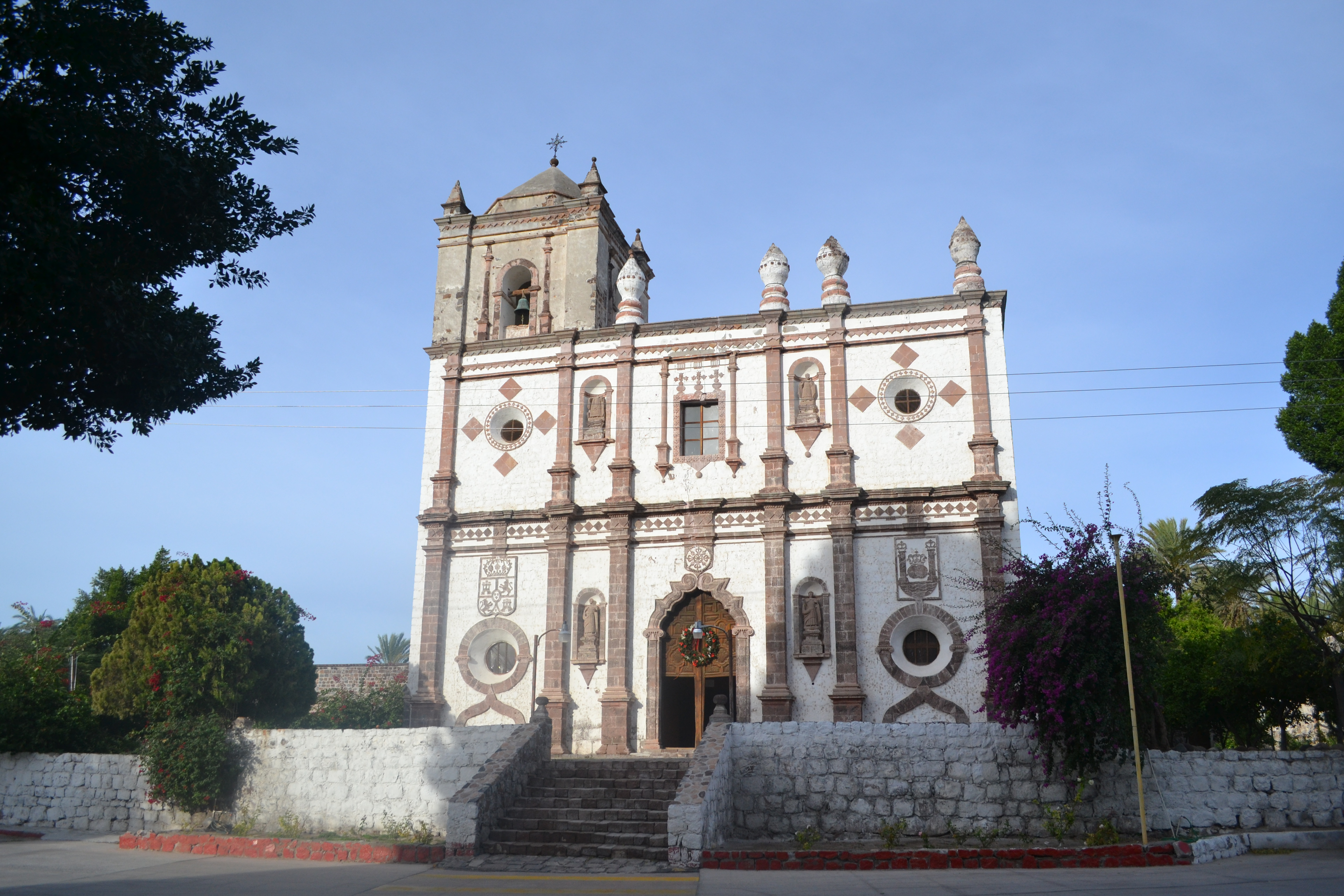
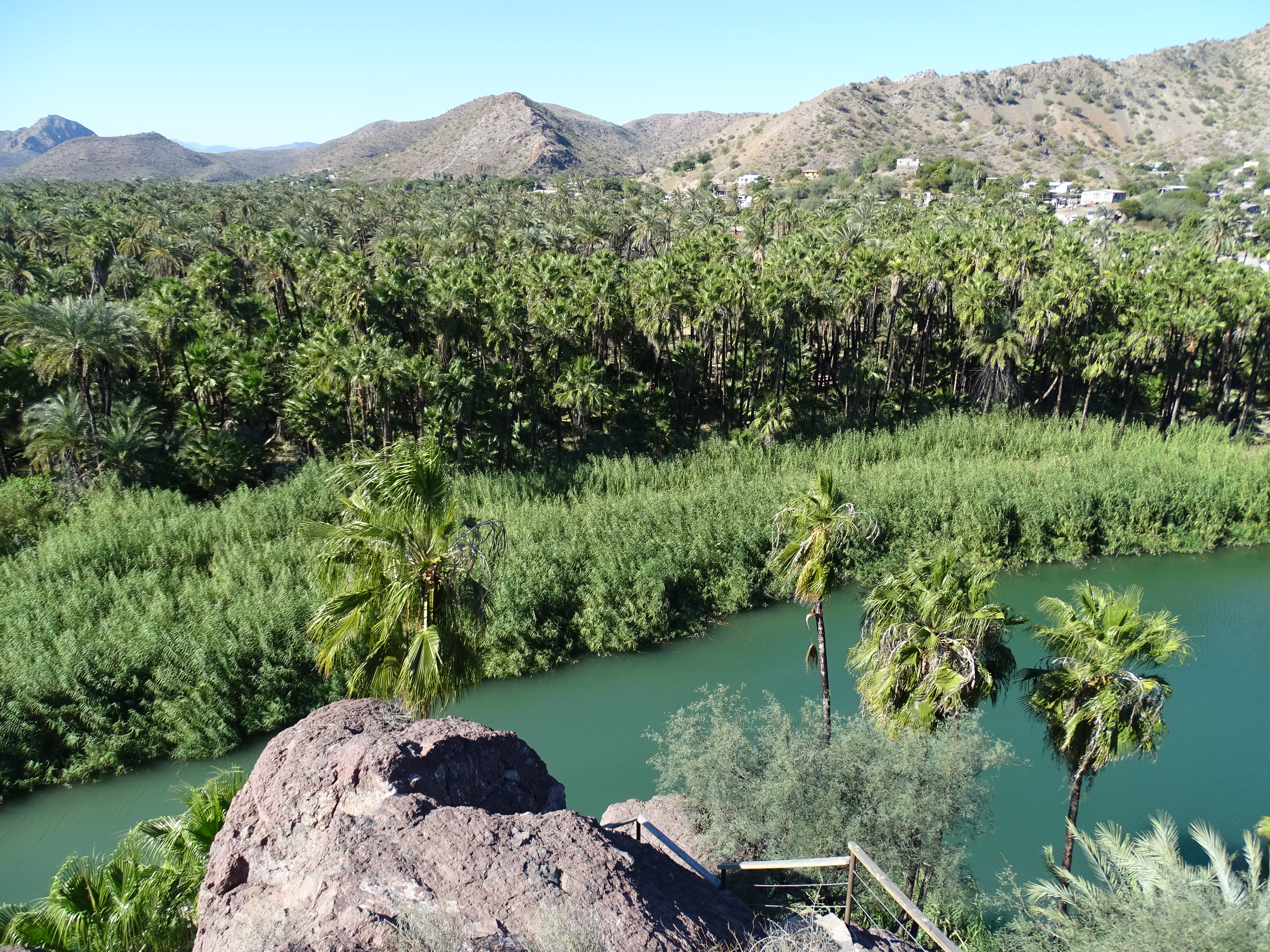
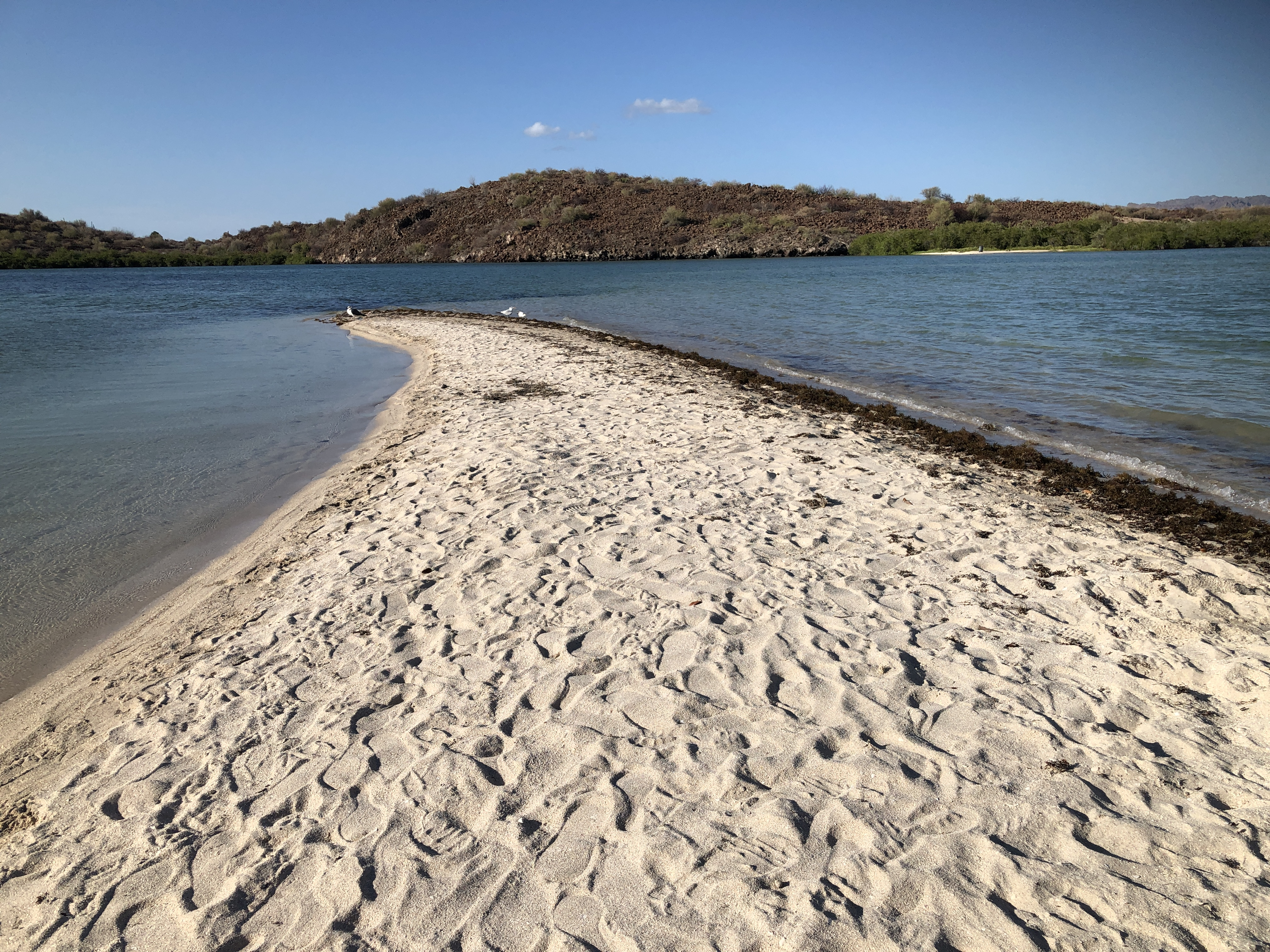
- Top: San Francisco Cave Paintings; Middle: Mission Santa Rosalía de Mulegé, Mission San Ignacio Kadakaamán; Bottom: Mulegé Oasis, San Ignacio Lagoon

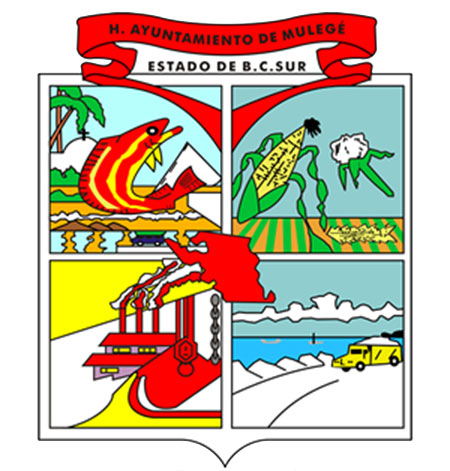
- Coat of arms

- Location of Mulegé in Baja California Sur.
- Country: Mexico
- State: Baja California Sur
- Municipal seat and largest city: Santa Rosalía

Government
  - Mayor: Edith Aguilar Villavicencio (PAN)

Area
  - Total: 33,092.20 km^{2} (12,776.97 sq mi)

Population (2020)
  - Total: 64,022
  - Density: 1.9347/km^{2} (5.0107/sq mi)
  - Seat: 14,357
- Time zone: UTC−07:00 (Zona Pacífico)
- Area code: +52 615

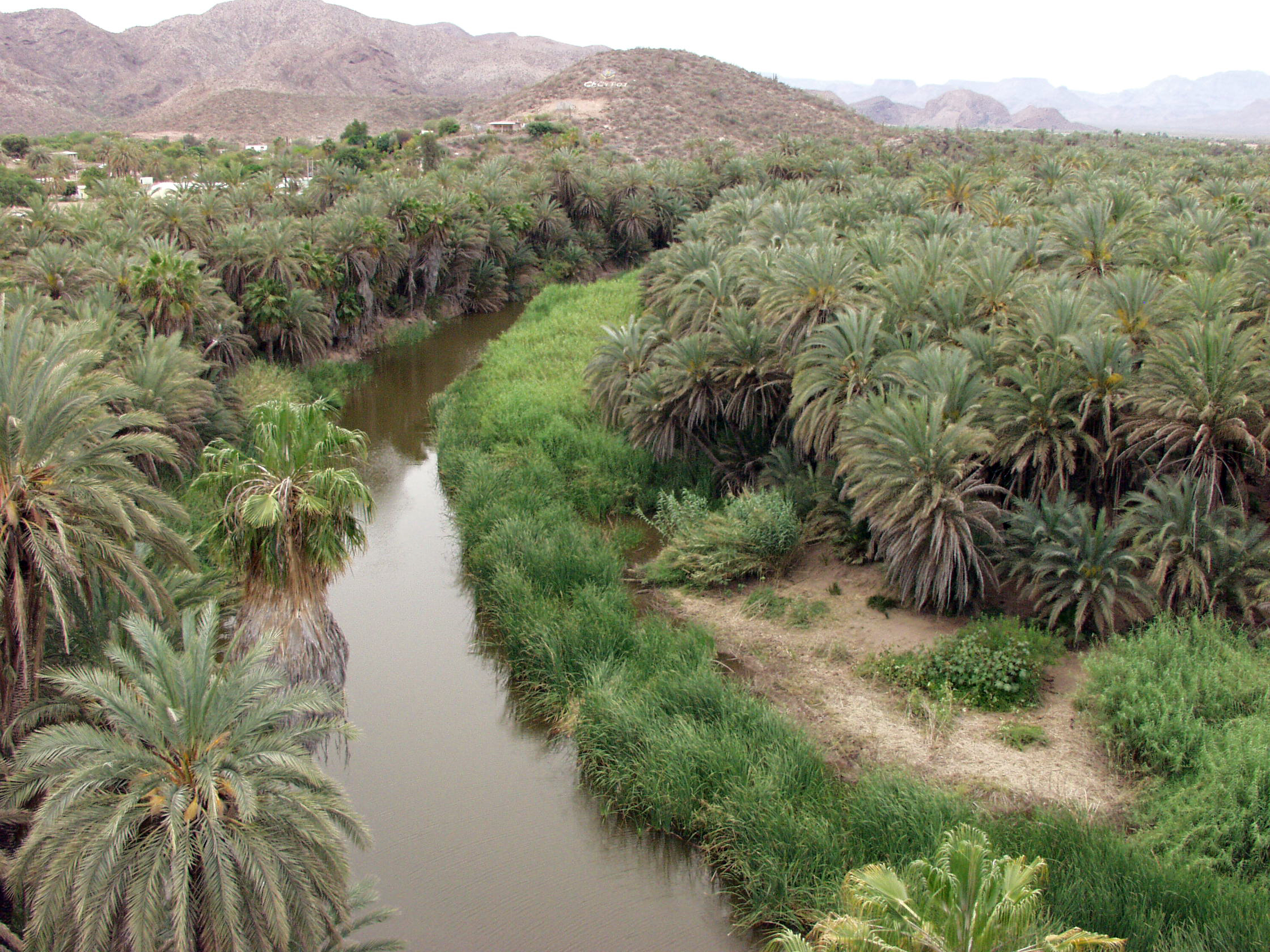
Mulegé oasis

Mulegé is the northernmost municipality of the Mexican state of Baja California Sur. It is the largest municipality by area in Mexico, with an area of 33,092.20 km^{2} (12,777 sq mi). In the 2020 Census, it had a population of 64,022 inhabitants. Isla Natividad is part of the municipality.

The municipal seat is located in Santa Rosalía. The El Vizcaíno Biosphere Reserve is located in the municipality, between the Pacific Ocean and the Gulf of California. With a landmass of over 24,930 km^{2} (9,625 sq mi), it is the largest wildlife refuge in Mexico and borders on the northern edge of the Valle de los Cirios Protected Area of Flora and Fauna.

== History ==
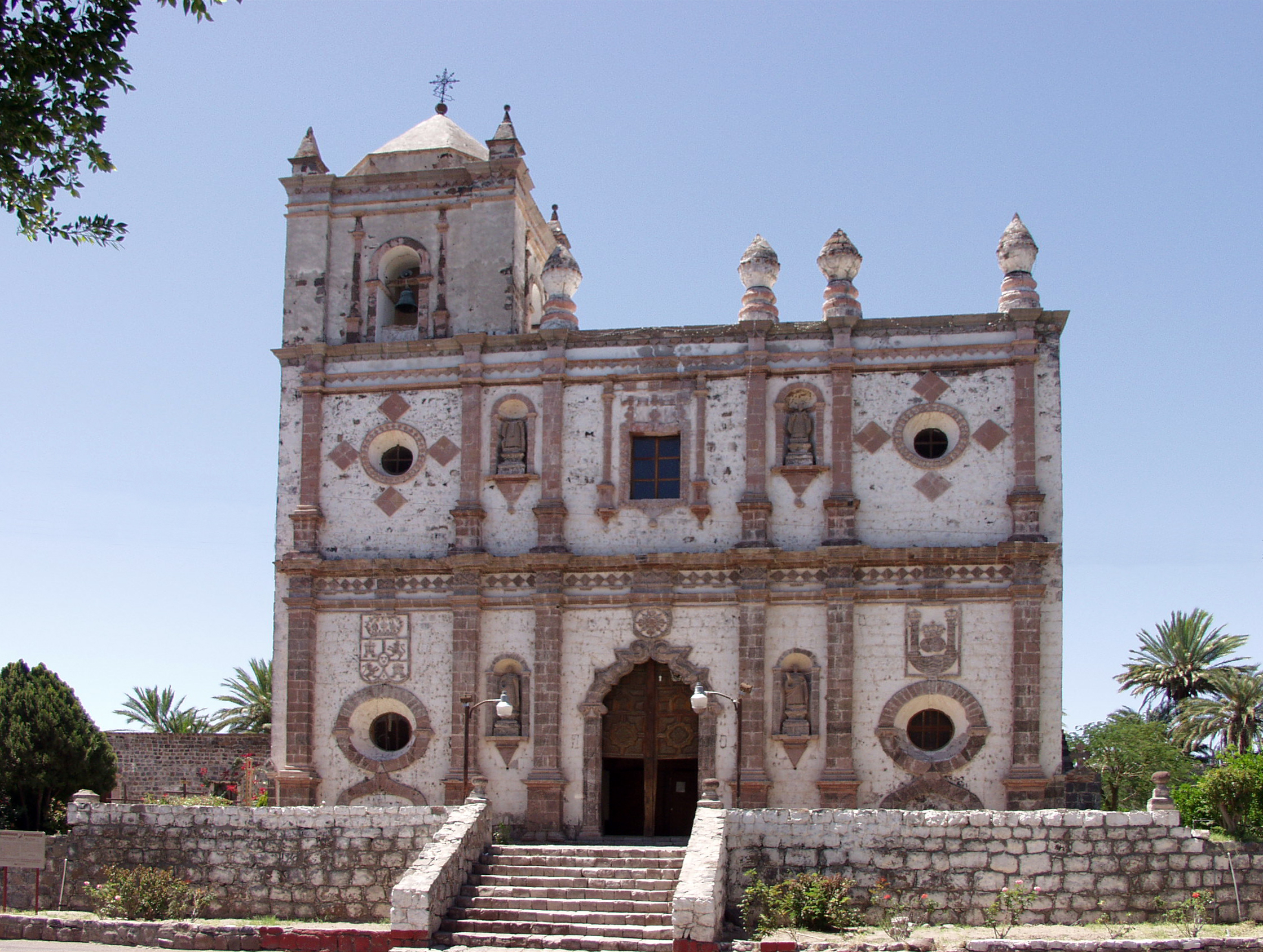
San Ignacio Mission

Juan Rodríguez Cabrillo was the first explorer to navigate the coastline of Mulegé, whereas Sebastián Vizcaíno explored the inlands in 1596 on behalf of Gaspar de Zúñiga, viceroy of New Spain.

The first Spanish missionary to visit the area was Father Juan María de Salvatierra in 1705. Three years later, the Jesuit missionary Juan de Basaldúa founded the Santa Rosalía de Mulegé mission in the area locally known as Caaman Cagaleja, which means "river between two rocks." Other important Jesuit missions in Mulegé were San Ignacio and Guadalupe. In 1768, the Franciscans took over responsibility for colonial Baja California from the Jesuits.

Rich copper deposits were discovered in 1868, later developed as mines. In 1872, Eiseman y Valle was incorporated as a business for the exploitation of copper. In 1885, the French mining company El Boleo began its operations and built the town of Santa Rosalía; the first copper smelting furnace was installed in 1886.

The municipality was first incorporated in 1916 as part of the Baja California Territory, Southern District. In 1929, the municipal council was replaced by a municipal delegation. By 1954, the mining company "El Boleo" ceased operations, which resulted in many people moving to other parts of the country, but three years later, Fomento Minero decided to take over the company and restarted the copper exploitation work. Guerrero Negro was founded in 1957 on the Pacific Coast to supply the demand of salt in the western United States. When Baja California Sur became a state in 1972, the municipality of Mulegé was formally established.

There is an initiative to split the municipality into two, with the division along the ridge dividing the current municipality. The Pacific side, with Guerrero Negro and Villa Alberto Andrés Alvarado Arámburo would be separated from the Gulf of California side, which includes Santa Rosalía and Mulegé.

As of March 1, 2021, the municipality reported 1,188 recoveries, 46 active cases, and 109 deaths from the COVID-19 pandemic in Mexico.

== Subdivisions ==
Including the municipal seat of Santa Rosalía, the municipality is subdivided into six delegaciones:

1. Santa Rosalía
2. Bahía Tortugas
3. Guerrero Negro
4. Mulegé
5. San Ignacio
6. Vizcaíno

== Economy ==
There are four main economic sectors in Mulegé: agriculture, mining, livestock and tourism.

=== Agriculture and livestock ===
Agriculture and livestock are principally concentrated in the area of Vizcaíno Valley and employs 36% of the population. There were 2,987.7 ha of crop land in the municipality. The main crops are tomatoes, chili peppers, onions, cucumbers, strawberries and figs. The meat production comes principally from cattle (697.8 tons), pigs (117.6 tons), goats (14.9 tons) and sheep (11 tons). There is also a significant production of milk from goats and cows.

=== Mining ===
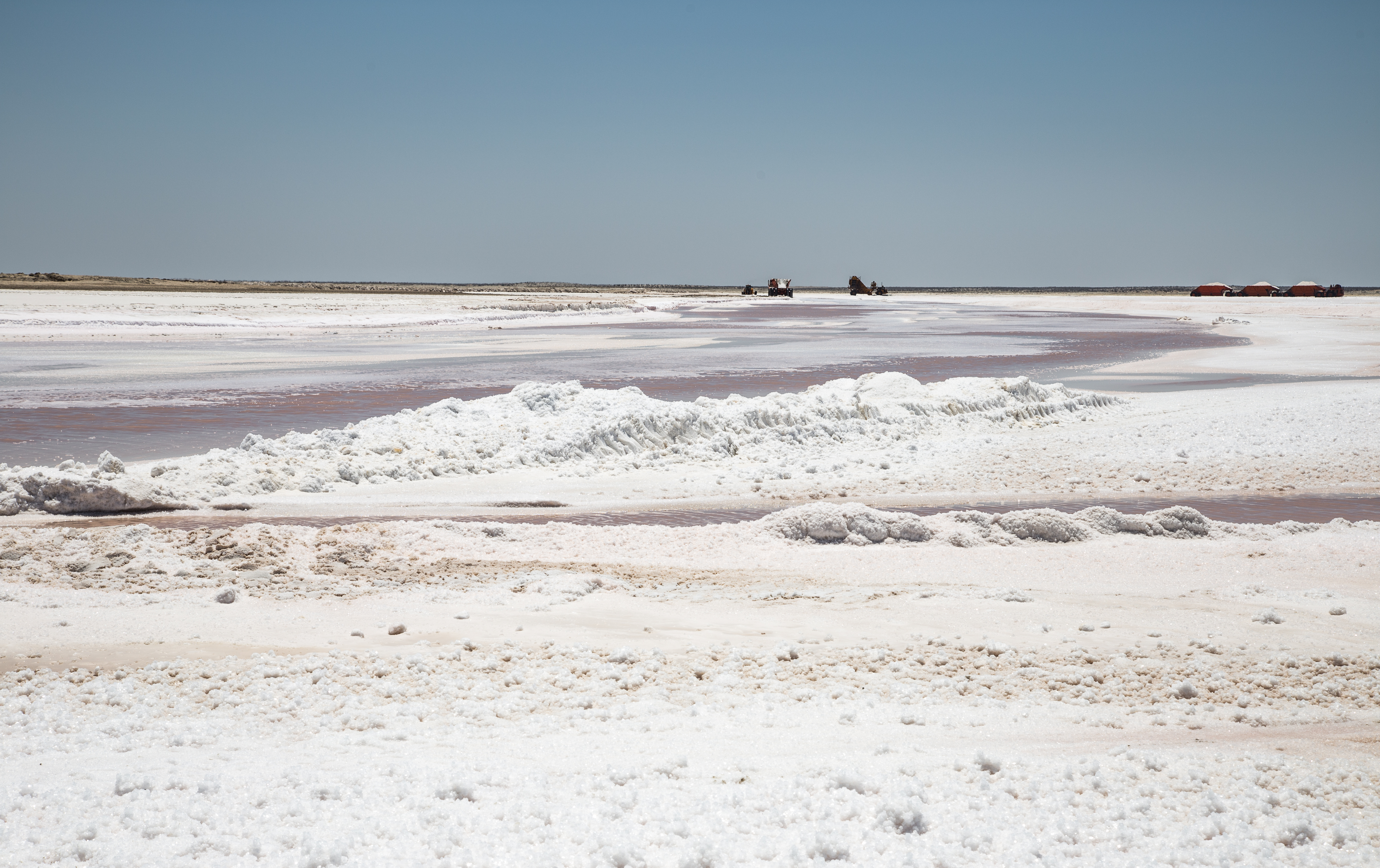
Salt production in Guerrero Negro

The mining sector is concentrated around the production of salt in Guerrero Negro (4.8 million tons), plaster in San Marcos Island (1.3 million ton) and copper in Santa Rosalía (11 thousand tons), and employs 21.6% of the population.

=== Fishing ===
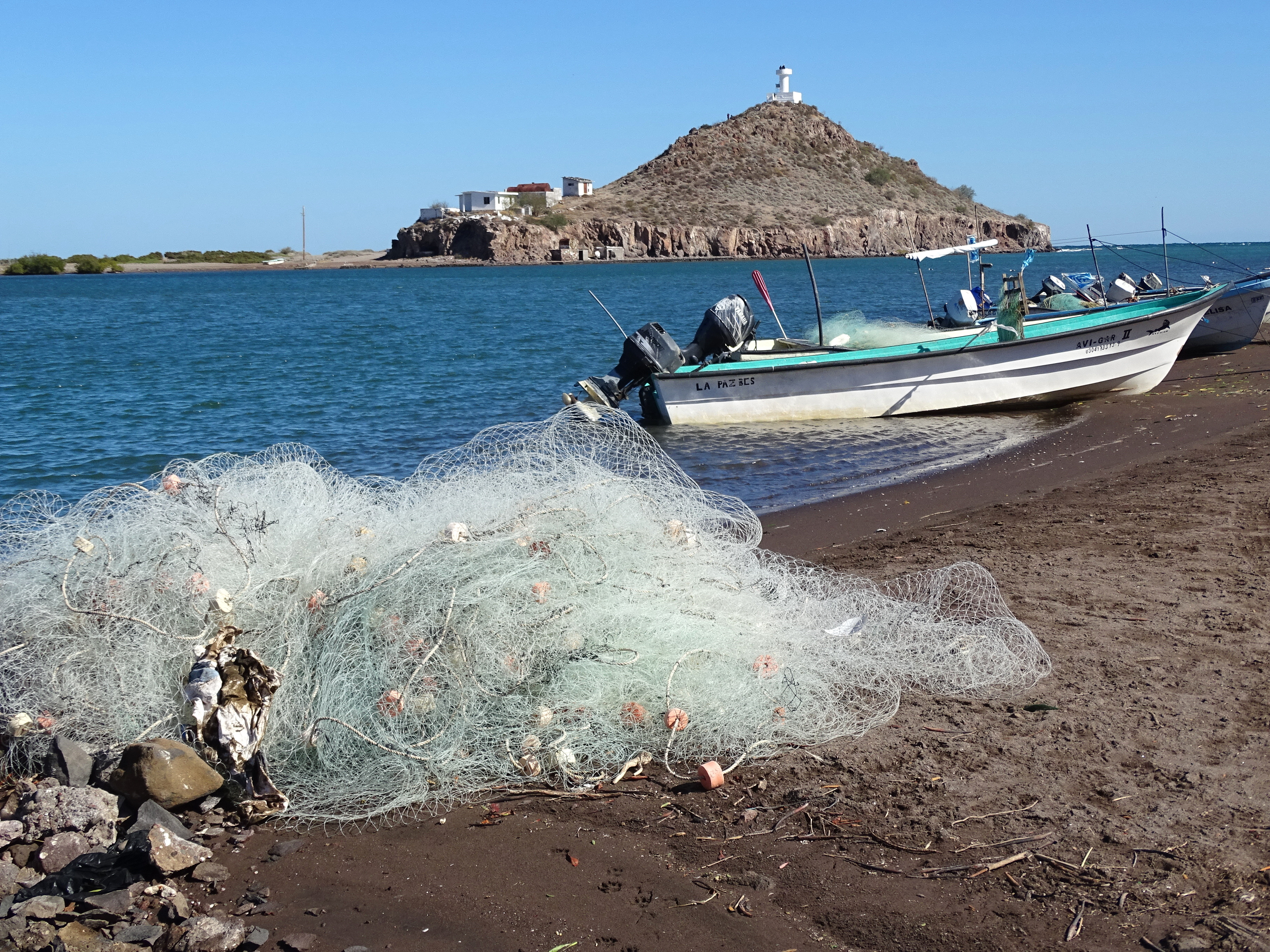
Fishing boats at Mulegé beach

The fishing sector employs 10.6% of the population. There were 19,329 tons of fish products in 2021, of which fish represented more than 62% of the captures. Other products include lobsters, sharks, shellfish and octopus. There also processing centers of lobster, abalone, snail and mackerel.

=== Tourism ===
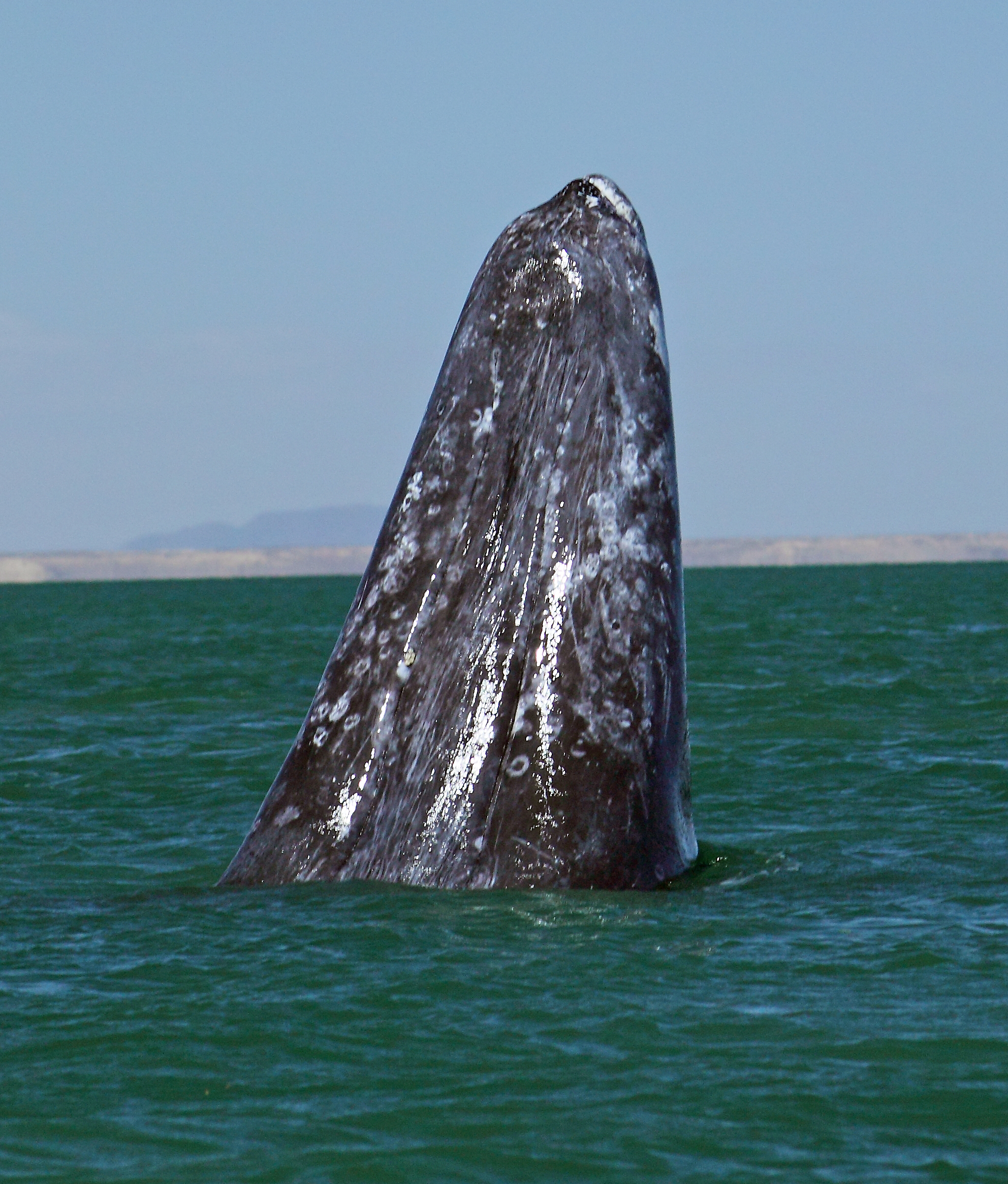
Whale watching at San Ignacio Lagoon

The tourism sector has been growing in the last years. The municipality is home of two jesuit missions of the XVII century in Mulegé and San Ignacio, these two towns also have oasis, which are a popular sightview in the desert. Santa Rosalía it's another spot, famous for being an historical mining town and their many buildings in French architectural style.

Ecotourism revolves around whale watching of gray whales at San Ignacio Lagoon and Guerrero Negro during the months of December to April. Mulegé also has many popular beaches, many of which are nearby Mulegé town.

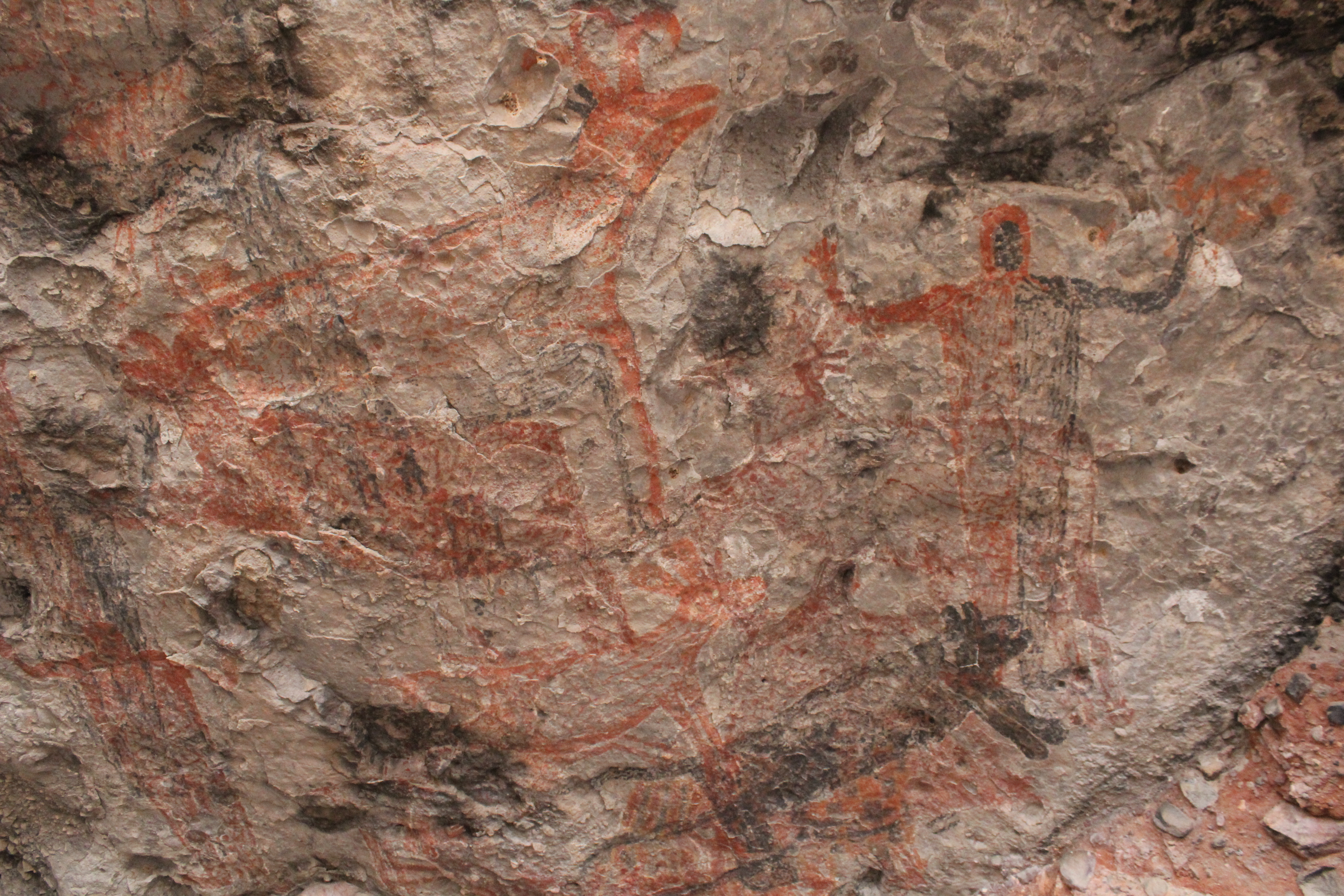
Cave paintings at El Ratón Cave

Mulegé also contains the most famous rock art sites in Baja California Sur and Mexico. The best known sites are located at Sierra de San Francisco, although many of them requires trips by mule of 3–5 days. There are minor sites at Sierra de Guadalupe, nearby Mulegé, which can be reached by car.

== Demographics and Transportation ==
Historical population
| Year | Pop. | ±% |
|---|---|---|
| 1970 | 19,416 | — |
| 1980 | 26,983 | +39.0% |
| 1990 | 38,528 | +42.8% |
| 1995 | 45,963 | +19.3% |
| 2000 | 45,989 | +0.1% |
| 2005 | 52,743 | +14.7% |
| 2010 | 59,114 | +12.1% |
| 2015 | 60,171 | +1.8% |
| 2020 | 64,022 | +6.4% |

The municipality has 381 localities, the largest of which (with 2020 populations in parentheses) were: Santa Rosalía (14,357 hab.), Guerrero Negro (13,596 hab.), Villa Alberto Andrés Alvarado Arámburo (10,897 hab.), Mulegé (3,834 hab.), Bahía Tortugas (2,367 hab.), classified as urban; and San Francisco (1,919 hab.), Bahía Asunción (1,453 hab.), Las Margaritas (1,145 hab.), and Estero de la Bocana (1,013 hab.), classified as rural.

Mulegé is crossed by the Carretera Transpeninsular (Mexican Federal Highway 1), which runs from Tijuana to Cabo San Lucas. Regional flights are available at the Palo Verde Airport in Santa Rosalía.
