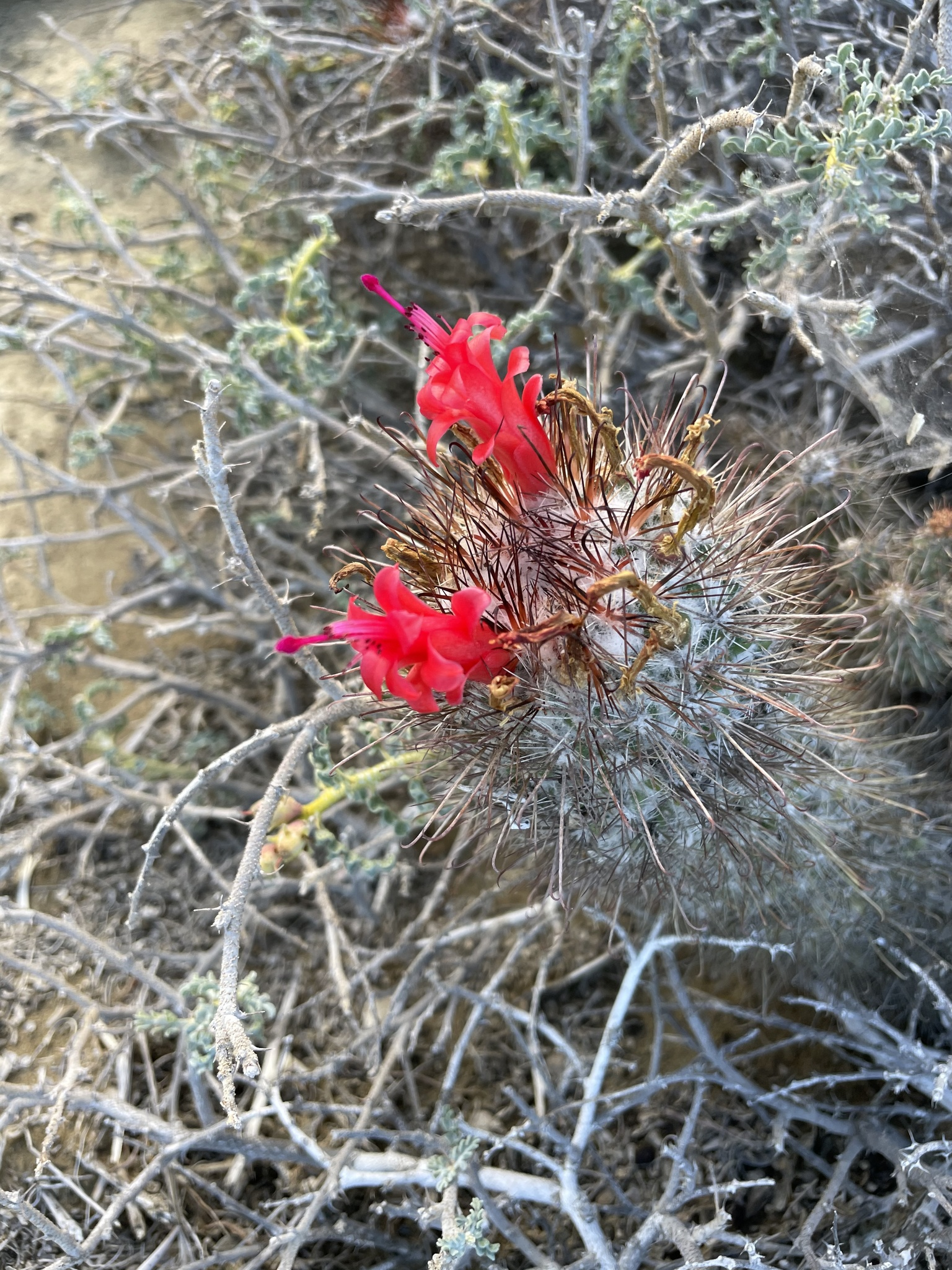

Conservation status
- Least Concern (IUCN 3.1)

Scientific classification
- Kingdom: Plantae
- Clade: Tracheophytes
- Clade: Angiosperms
- Clade: Eudicots
- Order: Caryophyllales
- Family: Cactaceae
- Subfamily: Cactoideae
- Genus: Cochemiea
- Species: C. pondii

Binomial name
- Cochemiea pondii (Greene) Walton

Synonyms
- Cactus pondii (Greene) J.M.Coult. 1894; Mammillaria pondii Greene 1889

= Cochemiea pondii =

Species of cactus

Cochemiea pondii is a species of Cochemiea found in Mexico.

== Description ==
Cochemiea pondii grows initially as a solitary plant and later forms small groups. Its cylindrical shoots can reach 30 cm (12 in) in length and 3 to 7 cm (1.2 to 2.8 in) in diameter. The conically arranged smooth warts have bristled axillae. Of the 4 to 5 central spines, one is always stiff, strongly hooked, whitish with a dark brown tip, and about 2.5 cm (0.98 in) long. The 20 to 30 slender marginal spines are white or occasionally brownish. The red, crooked flowers are up to 5 cm (2.0 in) long, with sometimes protruding stamens. The fruits are red.

== Distribution ==
Cochemiea pondii is widespread in the Mexican state of Baja California and is found only on Isla de Cedros at elevations from sea level to 200 m (660 ft). Plants are found growing among Agave sebastiana, Echinocereus maritimus, Cochemiea goodridgei, and Ferocactus chrysacanthus.

== Taxonomy ==
First described as Mammillaria pondii in 1889 by American botanist Edward Lee Greene, the specific epithet pondii honors US naval officer Charles Fremont Pond. Frederick Arthur Walton reclassified the species into the genus Cochemiea in 1899.
