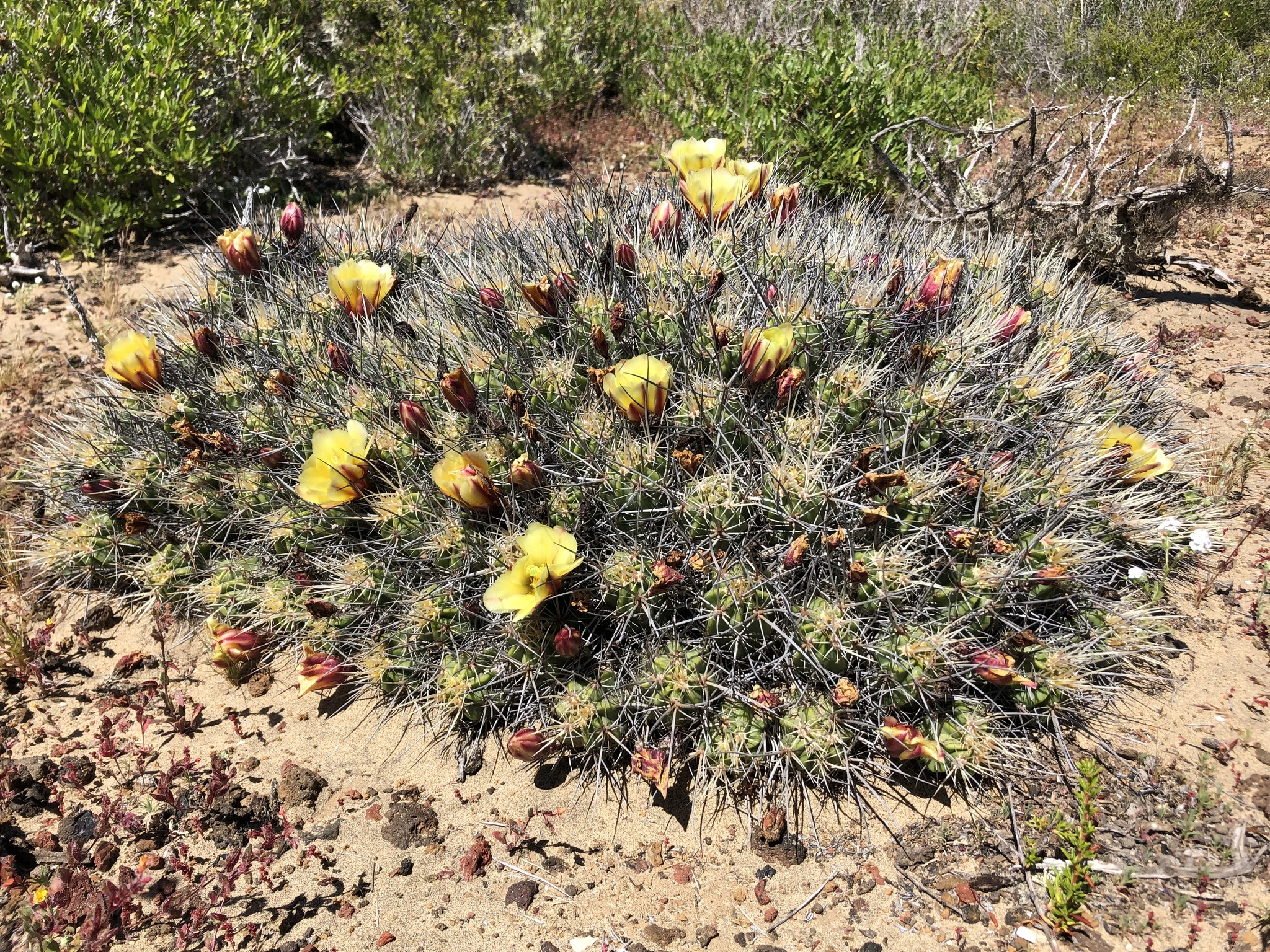

Conservation status
- Vulnerable (IUCN 3.1)

Scientific classification
- Kingdom: Plantae
- Clade: Tracheophytes
- Clade: Angiosperms
- Clade: Eudicots
- Order: Caryophyllales
- Family: Cactaceae
- Subfamily: Cactoideae
- Genus: Echinocereus
- Species: E. maritimus

Binomial name
- Echinocereus maritimus (M.E.Jones) K.Schum. 1898

Synonyms
- Cereus maritimus M.E.Jones 1883; Cereus flaviflorus Engelm. ex J.M.Coult. 1896; Echinocereus flaviflorus (Engelm. ex J.M.Coult.) Hildm. 1898; Echinocereus hancockii E.Y.Dawson 1949; Echinocereus maritimus subsp. hancockii (E.Y.Dawson) W.Blum & Rutow 1998; Echinocereus maritimus var. hancockii (E.Y.Dawson) N.P.Taylor 1985; Echinocereus orcuttii Rose ex Orcutt 1926

= Echinocereus maritimus =

Species of cactus

Echinocereus maritimus is a species of cactus native to Mexico.

== Description ==
Echinocereus maritimus is a cactus that forms cushions with up to 300 shoots, growing to 40 cm (16 in) high and 2 m (6 ft 7 in) in diameter. The light to dark green, cylindrical shoots are 5 to 30 cm (2.0 to 11.8 in) long and 3 to 7 cm (1.2 to 2.8 in) in diameter, with eight to twelve sharp ribs. Initially bright red, the spines turn dirty yellow or gray over time. The seven to ten central spines are flattened, angular, and 3 to 6 cm (1.2 to 2.4 in) long, while the radial spines are 1.5 to 2.5 cm (0.59 to 0.98 in) long.

The bright yellow, funnel-shaped flowers appear below the shoot tips, growing up to 6 cm (2.4 in) long and wide. The spherical, thorny fruits start green and turn red as they mature.

== Distribution ==
Echinocereus maritimus is native to the west coast of Mexico's Baja California peninsula and nearby islands growing in coastal desert scrub at elevations between 0 and 50 meters. Plants are found growing along with Euphorbia misera, Agave sebastiana, Bergerocactus emoryi, Lophocereus schottii, Myrtillocactus cochal, Ferocactus fordii, Cylindropuntia prolifera, Cochemiea pondii, Mammillaria brandegeei, and Cochemiea hutchisoniana subsp. louisae .

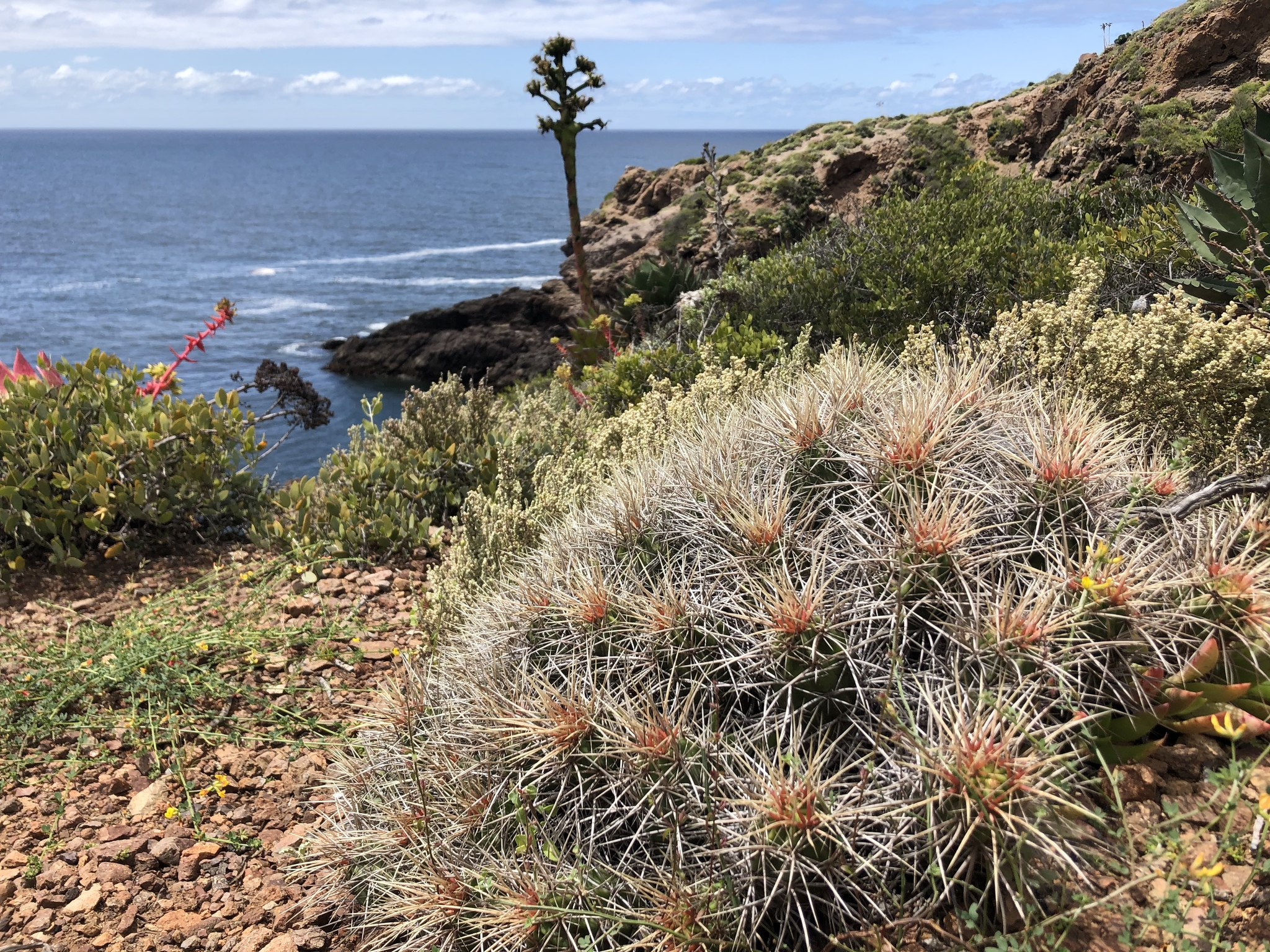
Plant growing in habitat in Ensenada, Baja California

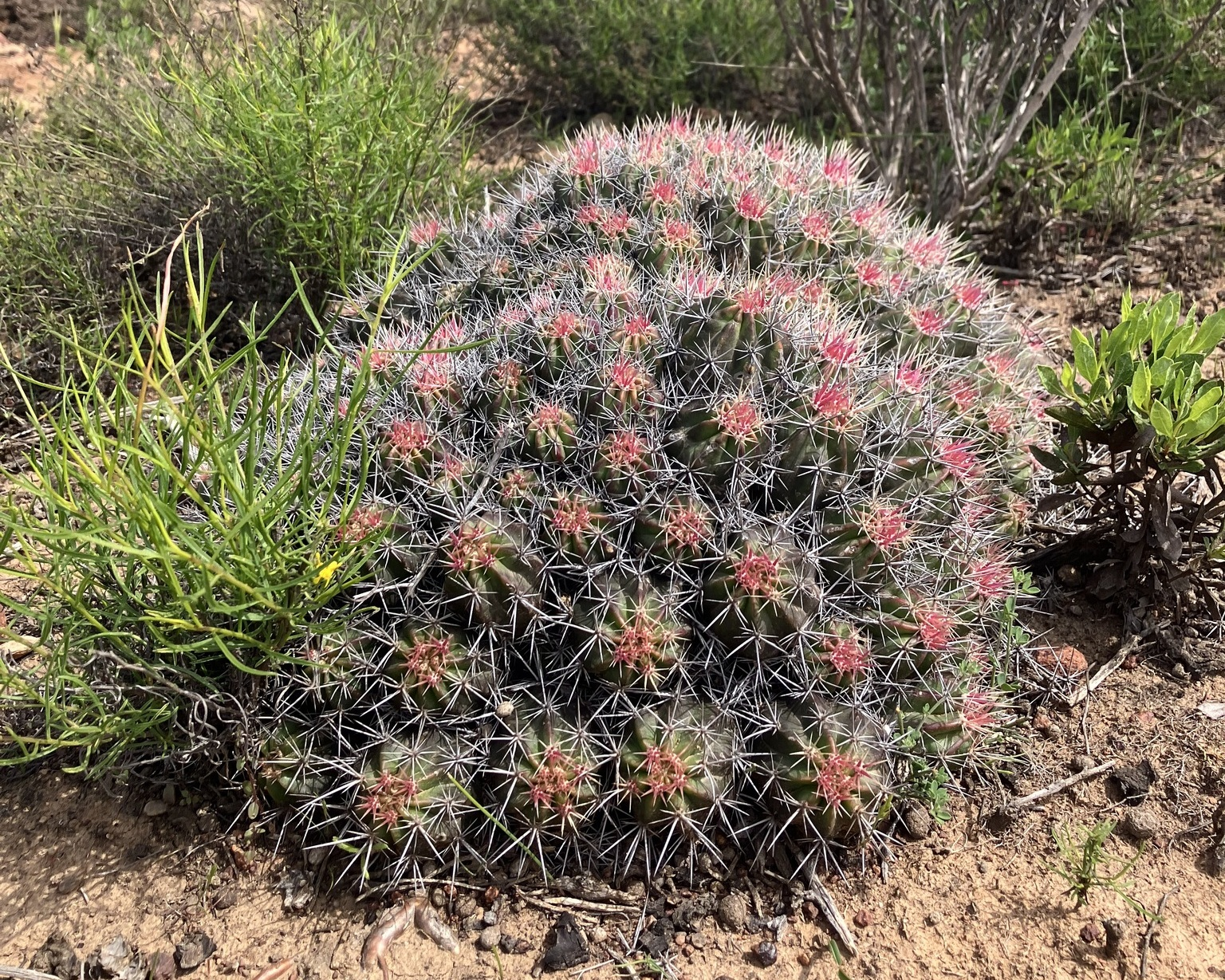
Habitat in Baja California, Mexico

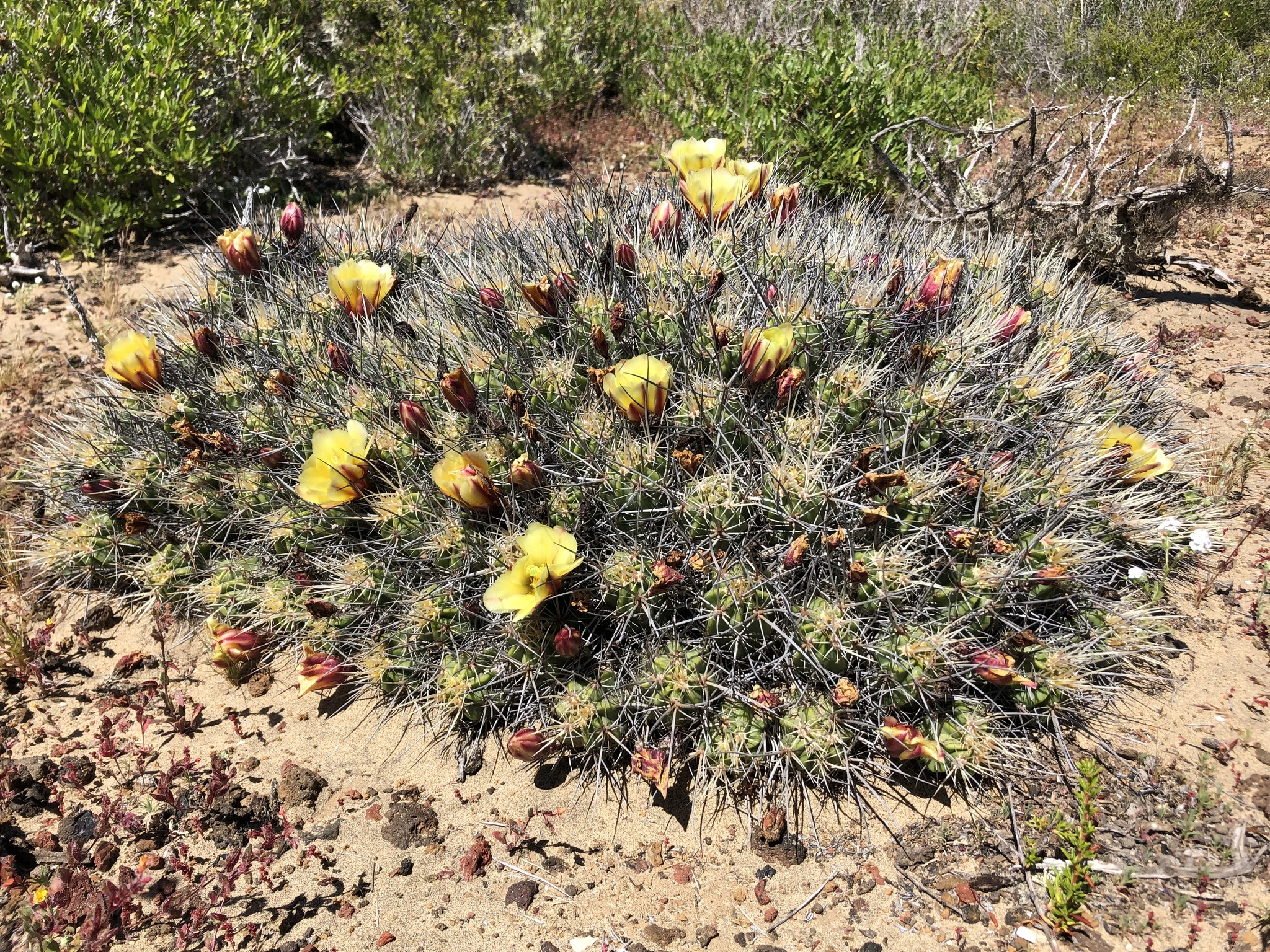
Plant blooming in Campo La Chorera, Baja California, Mexico

== Taxonomy ==
First described as Cereus maritimus by Marcus Eugene Jones in 1883, the species was reclassified by Karl Moritz Schumann in 1897. The name "maritimus," meaning "relating to the sea," reflects its preferred coastal habitat.
