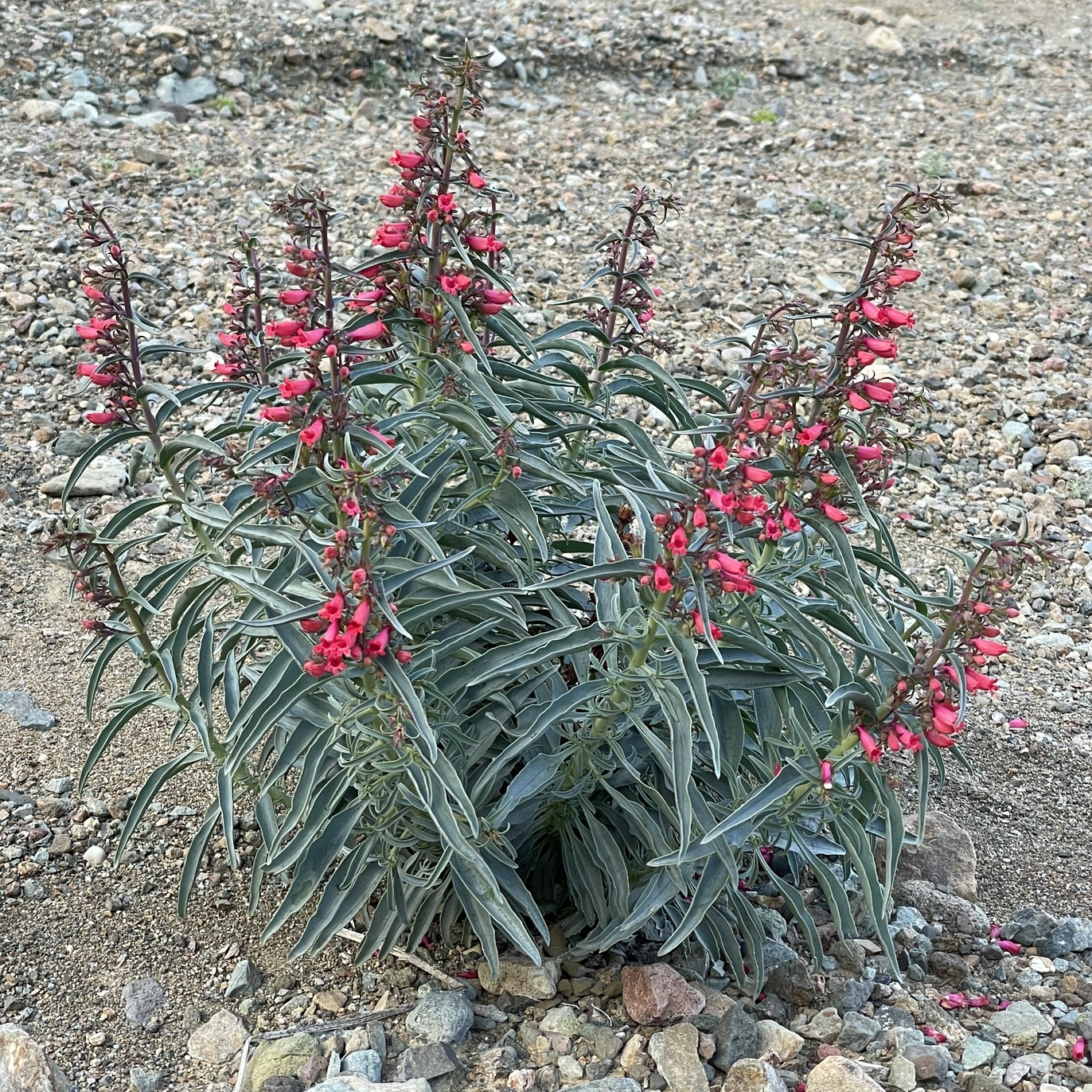
- Cedros Island, Baja California, Mexico

Scientific classification
- Kingdom: Plantae
- Clade: Tracheophytes
- Clade: Angiosperms
- Clade: Eudicots
- Clade: Asterids
- Order: Lamiales
- Family: Plantaginaceae
- Genus: Penstemon
- Species: P. cerrosensis

Binomial name
- Penstemon cerrosensis Kellogg

Synonyms
- Penstemon brevilabris; Penstemon cedrosensis

= Penstemon cerrosensis =

Plant species in the veronica family

Penstemon cerrosensis, also known as Cedros Island penstemon, is a species of flowering plant in the large Penstemon genus in the veronica family. It is endemic to Cedros Island in Baja California.

== Description ==
Penstemon cerrosensis grows between 10 and 40 centimeters tall with stems that are quite woody near the base, but otherwise herbaceous. Stems branch near their bases, are hairless, and glaucous; covered in natural waxes giving a grayish or bluish color.

Most of it leaves are attached by petioles, though the uppermost ones are almost sessile. They have smooth edges and are lanceolate to ovate-lanceolate in shape, like a spear head or somewhat egg shaped. Like the stems they are hairless and glaucous. The ends of the leaves recurve back towards the plant and the tip is mucronate, having the central leaf vein extended somewhat beyond the body of the leaf.

The many flowers of the inflorescence are attached to the main stem by branched peduncles, flower stalks, with two or three flowers in a group. The funnel shaped fused flower petals reach 12–15 millimeters in length and are bright scarlet in color. They are mildly ventricose, inflated, on their undersides and curved upwards. The five lobes at the mouth of the flower are almost equal in size. The staminode is also hairless and slightly expanded towards its end.

It can bloom in March, April, May, or June.

== Taxonomy ==
Penstemon cerrosensis is classified in the Penstemon genus in family Plantaginaceae. It was given its first scientific description and name by Albert Kellogg in 1863. The specimens that Kellogg used to describe the plants from the island were collected by John Veatch in 1858. At the time Cedros Island was incorrectly marked on English language maps as Cerros Island. Starting in 1888 a number of botanists including Edward Lee Greene and Louis Krautter corrected this name as Penstemon cedrosensis, but as Kellogg's spelling was intentional it is not subject to correction under botanical rules. Despite this notable botanists such as Ira Loren Wiggins have used the name as recently as 1980. It has no subspecies or varieties, but it has two botanical synonyms.

Synonyms
Name	Year	Notes
Penstemon brevilabris A.Gray	1882	= het.
Penstemon cedrosensis Krautter	1908	= het., orth. var.
Notes: Both are heterotypic synonyms

=== Names ===
It is known in English as Cedros Island penstemon. When it was described by Kellogg in the Hesperian magazine in 1860 he bestowed the evocative name hummingbird's dinner horn.

== Range and habitat ==
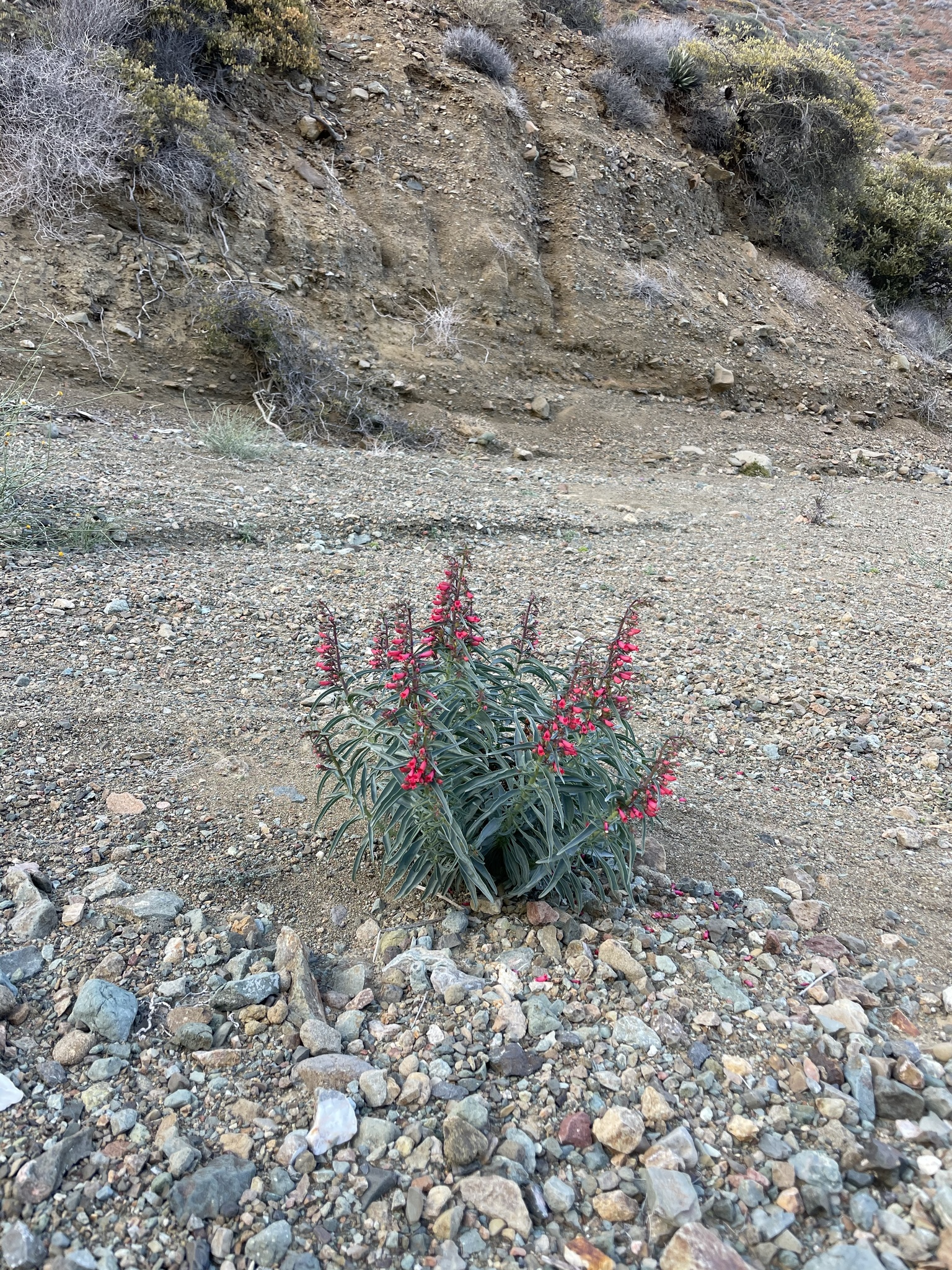
The same plant showing rocky and sandy growing conditions

The natural range of Penstemon cerrosensis is restricted to Isla Cedros in the Pacific Ocean just off the west coast of the Baja California peninsula.

Plants grow on rocky slopes and on cliff faces on the island. It can be found from elevations of 25 to 1,150 meters (80 to 3,770 ft). It is part of the canyon slope scrub community on the island, which is dominated by shrubs like redberry buckthorn (Rhamnus crocea ssp. insula), Cedros Island sage (Salvia cedrosensis), and Baja desert-thorn (Lycium brevipes).

== Ecology ==
Its bright red flowers are pollinated by hummingbirds.

== Uses ==
This penstemon is not in cultivation.

== See also ==
- List of Penstemon species
