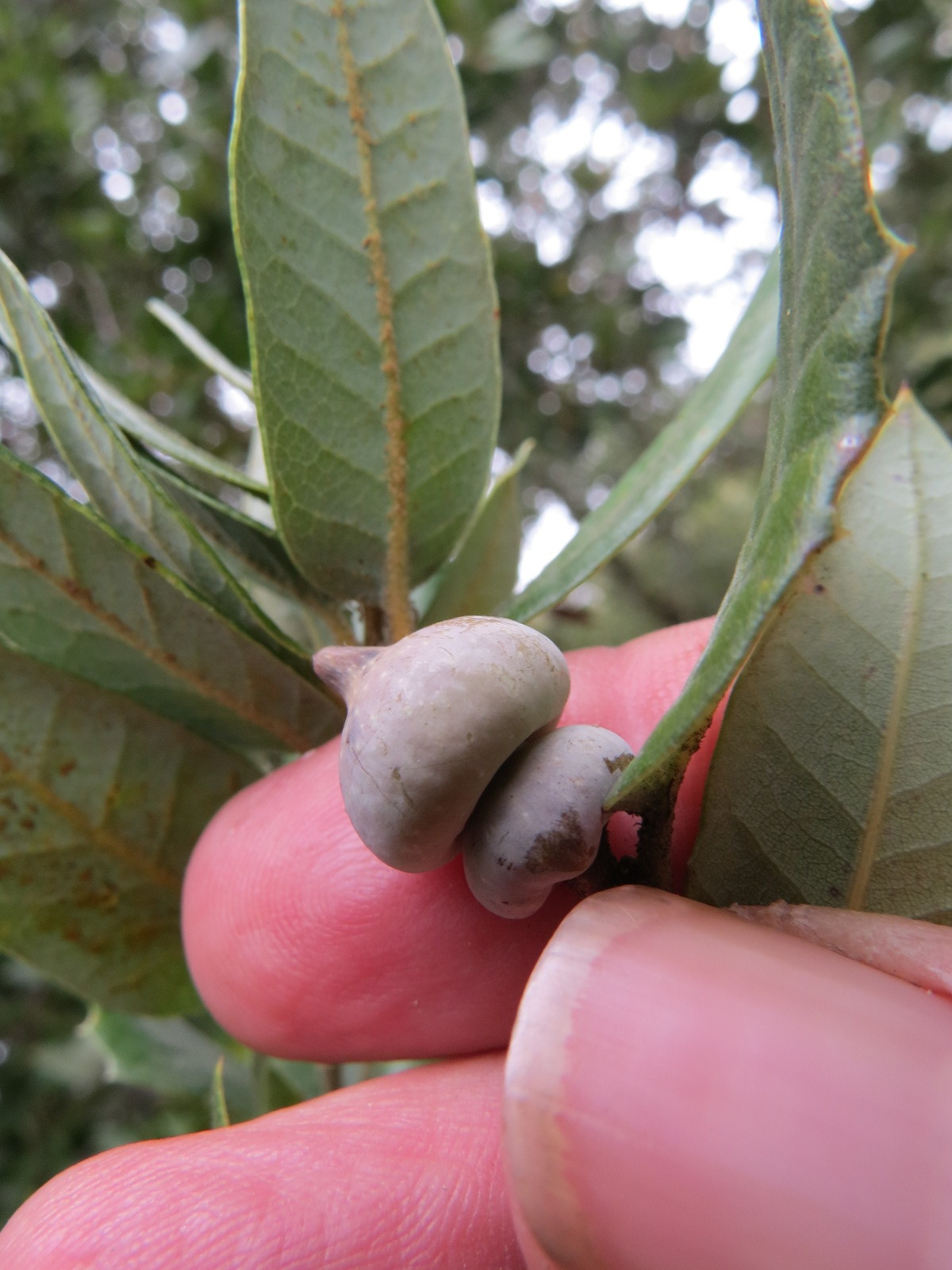
- San Mateo County, 2019

Scientific classification
- Kingdom: Animalia
- Phylum: Arthropoda
- Clade: Pancrustacea
- Class: Insecta
- Order: Hymenoptera
- Family: Cynipidae
- Genus: Heteroecus
- Species: H. sanctaeclarae

Binomial name
- Heteroecus sanctaeclarae (Fullaway, 1911)
- Heteroecus sanctaeclarae range, estimated with the iNaturalist Geomodel, 2025

= Heteroecus sanctaeclarae =

North American gall-inducing wasp

Heteroecus sanctaeclarae, also known as the mushroom gall wasp (because it looks like a toadstool cottage in a children's book about woodland creatures), is a species of cynipid wasp that induces galls on huckleberry oaks and canyon live oaks on the Pacific coast of North America.

It has also been called the steeple gall wasp because the tops of the galls look like the onion domes of Eastern Orthodox churches. The larval chamber lies in the bottom section at the seam between the two sections of the gall. According to gallformers.org, the bud galls induced by this wasp come in many colors, including beige, grey, pink, purple, and white.

This species may have first been described in 1911 by David T. Fullaway as Callirhytis sanctae-clarae.
