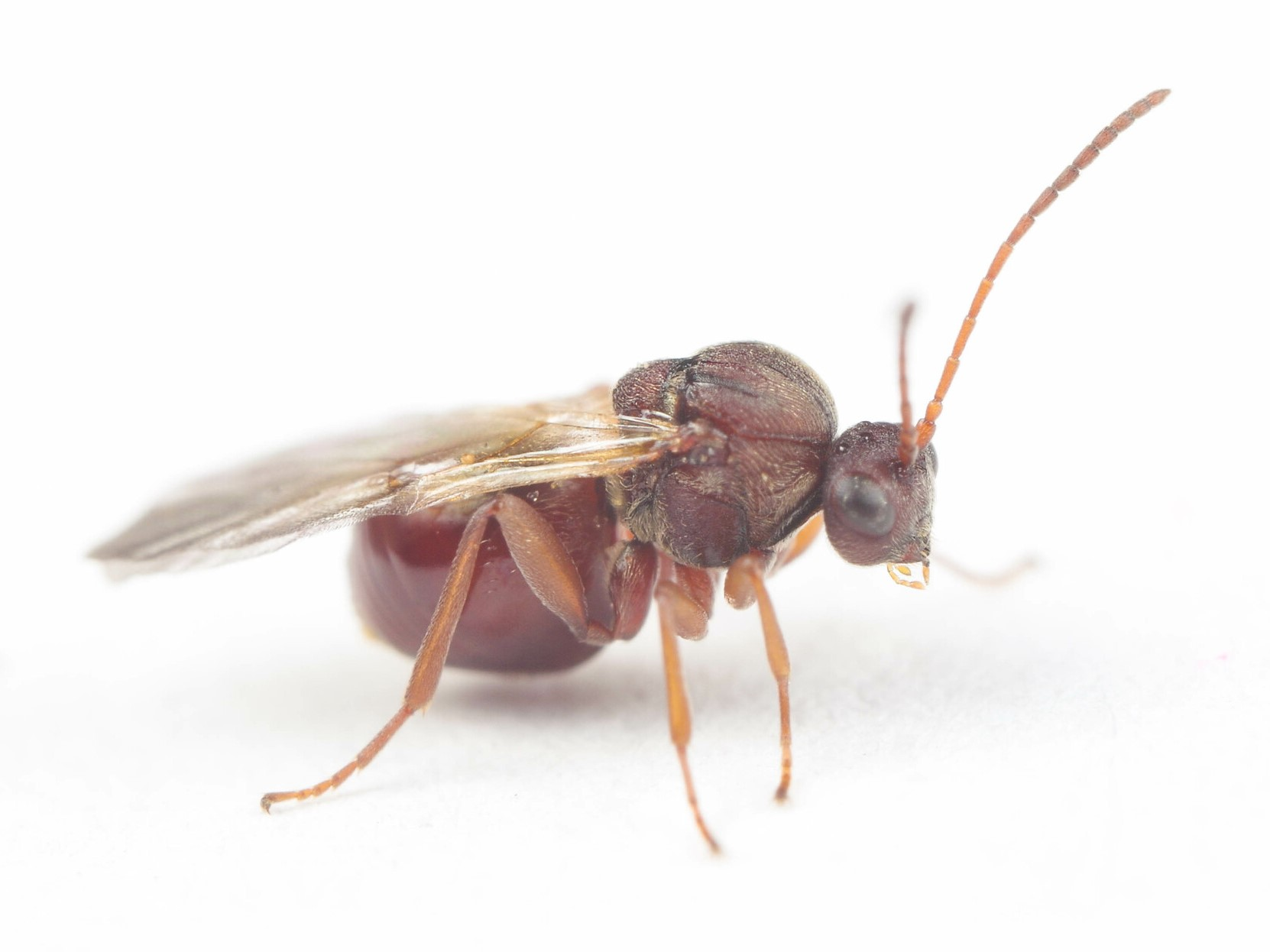

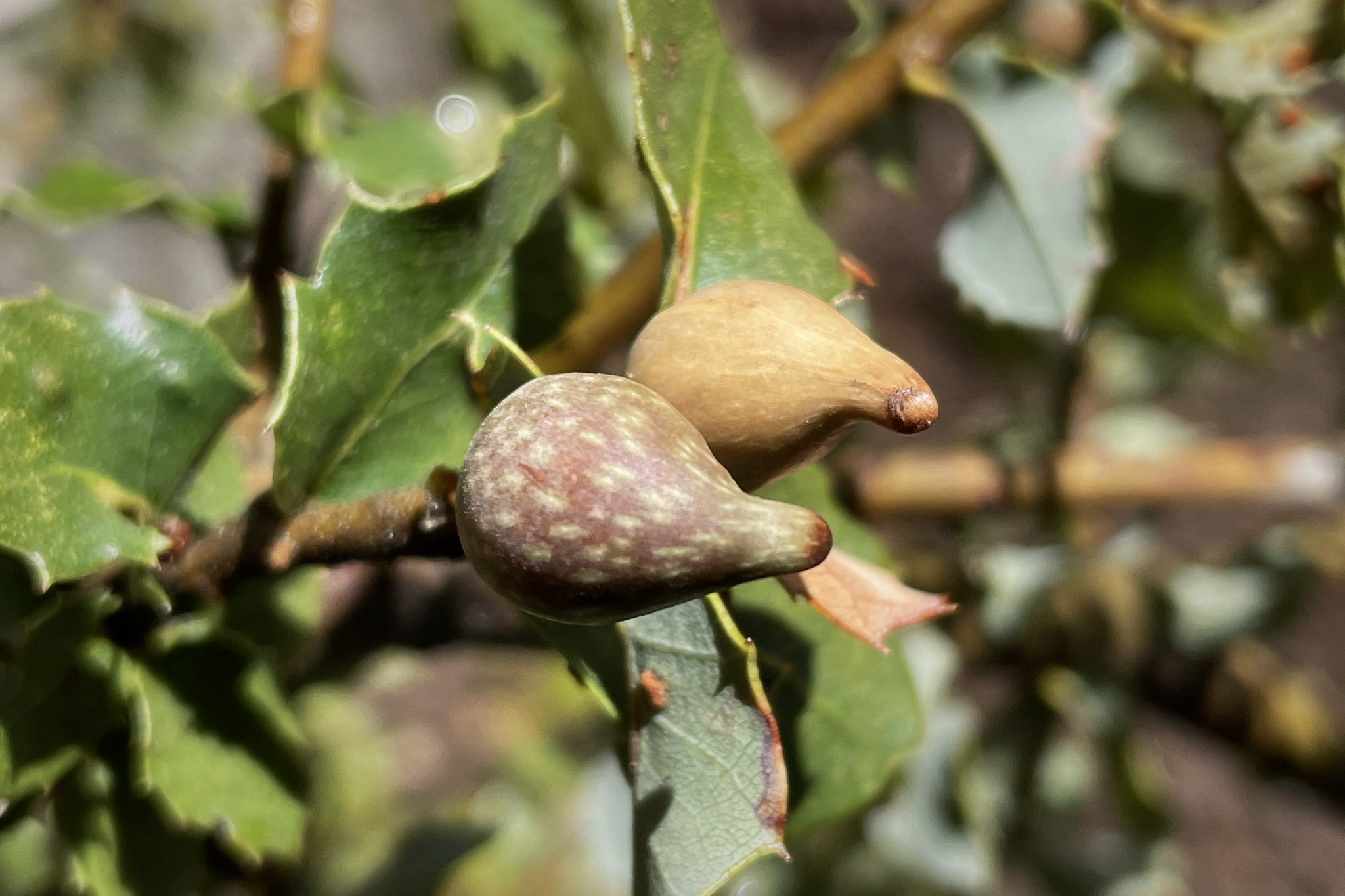
- Adult (top) and beaked spindle galls (bottom)

Scientific classification
- Kingdom: Animalia
- Phylum: Arthropoda
- Class: Insecta
- Order: Hymenoptera
- Family: Cynipidae
- Genus: Heteroecus
- Species: H. pacificus

Binomial name
- Heteroecus pacificus (Ashmead, 1896)

= Heteroecus pacificus =

Species of wasp

Heteroecus pacificus, the beaked spindle gall wasp, is a species of gall wasp in the family Cynipidae. It occurs in western North America. The galls appear on canyon live oak (Quercus chrysolepis) and huckleberry oak (Quercus vaccinifolia).

Heteroecus pacificus has two generations per year: one of sexually reproducing males and females, and the other consisting solely of parthenogenetic females. Parthenogenetic females measure 2.8–3.7 mm (0.11–0.15 in) in length and sexual ones 2.2–2.8 mm (0.087–0.110 in).
