= Charles Pond =

Charles Pond may refer to:

- Charles H. Pond (1781–1861), American politician in Connecticut
- Charles Fremont Pond (1856–1929), United States Navy admiral
