= Isla Natividad Airstrip =

- IATA: none; ICAO: MX53; LID: ISN

Summary
- Airport type: Private
- Operator: SCPP "Buzos y Pescadores de la Baja California", SCL
- Location: Natividad, Baja California Sur
- Elevation AMSL: 22 ft / 7 m
- Coordinates: 27°51′28″N 115°09′54″W
- Interactive map of Isla Natividad Airstrip

Runways
Direction	Length		Surface
Direction	ft	m	Surface
03/21	3,918	1,194	Soil

Isla Natividad Airstrip is a private dirt airstrip located on the South East coast of Isla Natividad, Municipality of Mulegé, Baja California Sur, Mexico, an island located in the Pacific Ocean, 6 km West of the Baja California Peninsula. The airstrip handles air traffic service for the fishing town of Natividad. The airstrip is handled by "Sociedad Cooperativa de Productos Pesqueros Buzos y Pescadores de la Baja California SCL", a fishing cooperative that exploits the fish resources that exist around the island.
