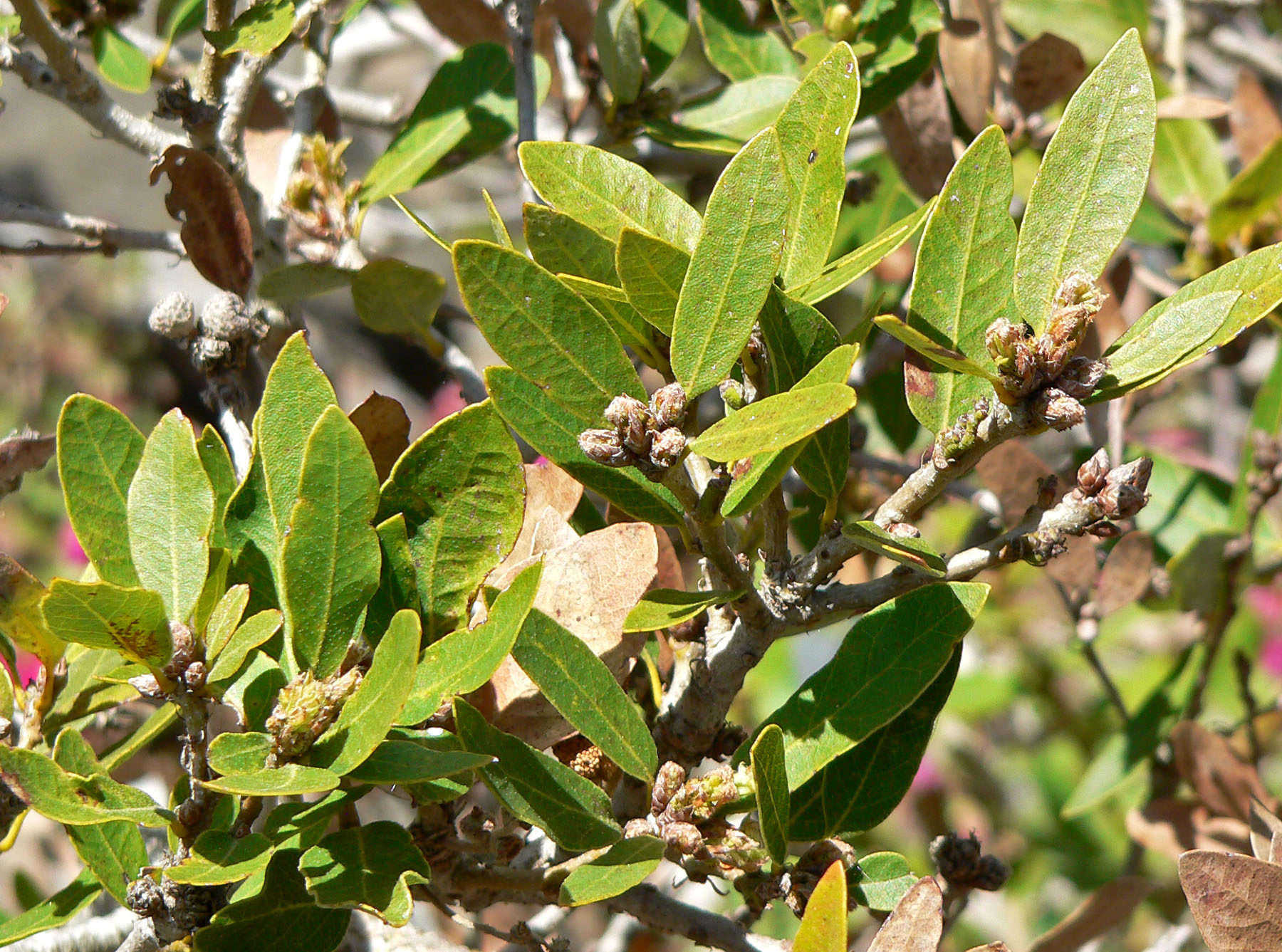

Conservation status
- Least Concern (IUCN 3.1)

- Apparently Secure (NatureServe)

Scientific classification
- Kingdom: Plantae
- Clade: Embryophytes
- Clade: Tracheophytes
- Clade: Spermatophytes
- Clade: Angiosperms
- Clade: Eudicots
- Clade: Rosids
- Order: Fagales
- Family: Fagaceae
- Genus: Quercus
- Subgenus: Quercus subg. Quercus
- Section: Quercus sect. Protobalanus
- Species: Q. vacciniifolia

Binomial name
- Quercus vacciniifolia Kellogg

Synonyms
- Quercus vaccinifolia Kellogg; Quercus vaccinifolia Kellogg, not validly published; Quercus chrysolepis var. vacciniifolia (Kellogg) Engelm.; Quercus chrysolepis subsp. vacciniifolia (Kellogg) A.E.Murray

= Quercus vacciniifolia =

Huckleberry oak

Species of oak tree

Quercus vacciniifolia (sometimes spelled Q. vaccinifolia), the huckleberry oak, is a member of the Protobalanus section of genus Quercus. It has evergreen foliage, short styles, very bitter acorns that mature in 18 months, and a woolly acorn shell interior.

== Description ==
Quercus vacciniifolia is a shrubby evergreen of the oak family, which grows generally less than 1.5 metres (5 feet) tall and spreads horizontally, never becoming a tree. In the field, the genus is best identified from its clustered terminal buds. The species is most easily identified by its acorns. Those of Q. vacciniifolia are 7.5–18 millimetres (5/16–11/16 in) long and mature in 2 years after pollination.

=== Similar species ===
Q. vacciniifolia can be easily confused with Q. cedrosensis, which grows in dry chaparrals, such as California-Mexico border south, forests of Baja California and at higher elevations on Cedros Island. Morphologically, the two species differ in their leaf margins: while Q. vacciniifolia leaves are entire to mucro-toothed, Q. cedrosensis leaves are entire or have irregular spine-tipped teeth.

== Distribution and habitat ==
Quercus vacciniifolia is native to the western United States, where it can be found in the Sierra Nevada of California, where its distribution extends just into Nevada, and the Klamath Mountains and southern Cascade Range as far north as southern Oregon. It grows in high mountain forests. It also dominates sections of mountain chaparral.

The species can be found in steep slopes, ridges, conifer forests, and sub-alpine forest, mostly in high montane area at elevations of 150 to 2,930 m (490 to 9,610 ft). It is native to California, but can also be found in Oregon and Nevada. Hybridization between Q. vacciniifolia and Q. chrysolepis has been extensively reported in Sierra Nevada. Between the early and middle Holocene, 11,000 and 5,000 cal years BP, Q. vacciniifolia were an extensive shrub in the Klamath Mountains (at the northern portions of California), which had ultramafic soils. At this period, Q. vacciniifolia was a main fire developer due to its abundance, mid-height and resinous leaves. Today, Q. vacciniifolia rarely forms dense chaparral-like stands, allowing fire resistant species to grow intermittently.

== Ecology ==
Many animal species use this shrub for food, including mule deer, which eat the leaves, and many birds and mammals, including the American black bear, which eat the acorns.

== Uses ==
The acorns are edible.

The Quercus vacciniifolia plant is used in restoration, revegetation, and garden landscaping. It is good for preventing erosion, such as on the slopes above Lake Tahoe to slow the erosion that pollutes the lake.
