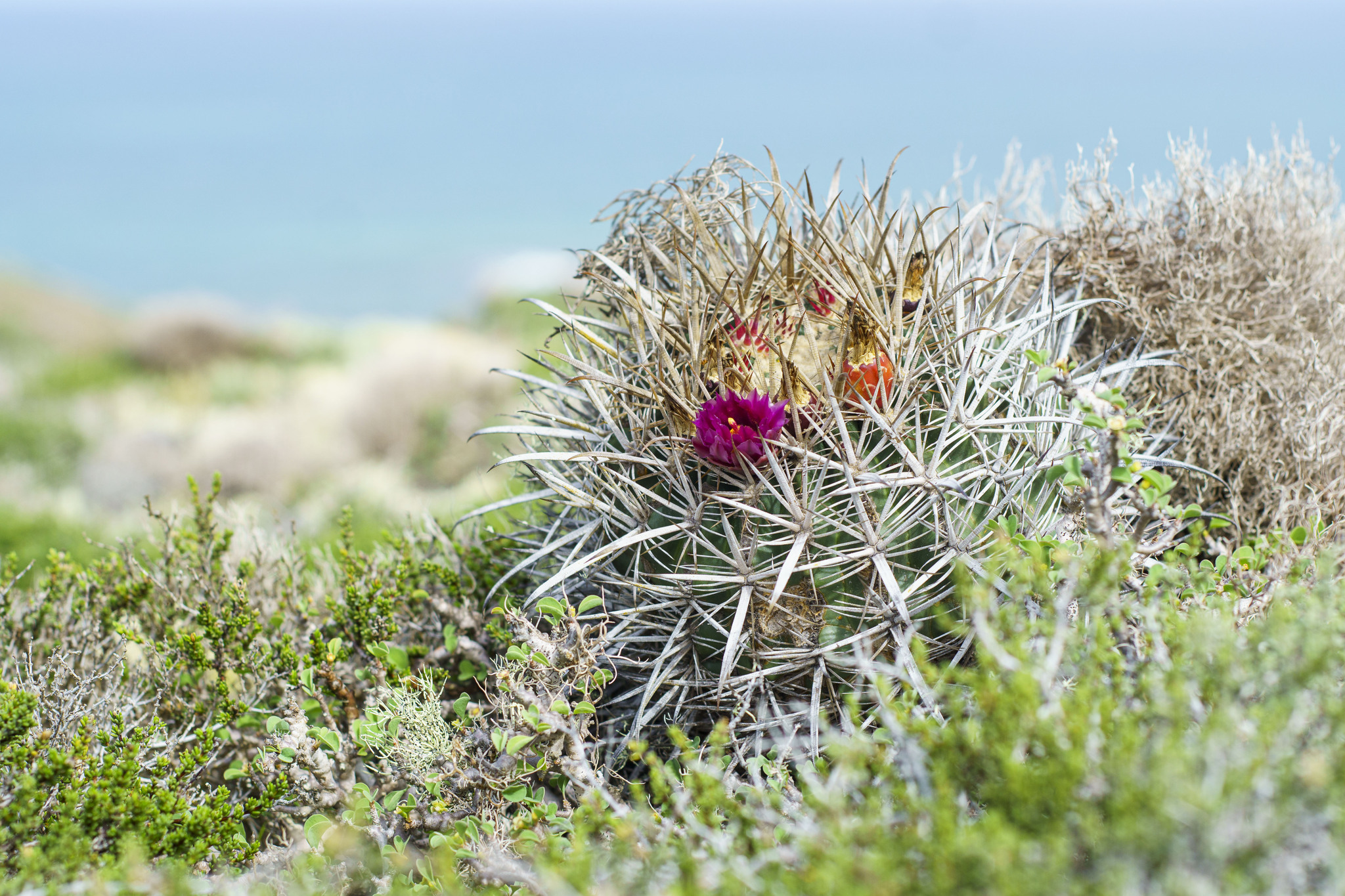
- Ferocactus fordii borealis flowering at Punta Baja, Baja California.

Conservation status
- Vulnerable (IUCN 3.1)

Scientific classification
- Kingdom: Plantae
- Clade: Embryophytes
- Clade: Tracheophytes
- Clade: Angiosperms
- Clade: Eudicots
- Order: Caryophyllales
- Family: Cactaceae
- Subfamily: Cactoideae
- Genus: Ferocactus
- Species: F. fordii

Binomial name
- Ferocactus fordii (Orcutt) Britton & Rose

Synonyms
- Echinocactus fordii Orcutt

= Ferocactus fordii =

Species of cactus

Ferocactus fordii is a species of succulent plant in the family Cactaceae, commonly known as Ford's barrel cactus, endemic to the Baja California Peninsula of Mexico. It is spherical, growing to 50 cm (20 in) in diameter, with whitish-grey radial spines and solitary flowers of a deep rose pink, 4 cm (2 in) in diameter.

== Description ==
Ferocactus fordii var. fordii is relatively small in stature barrel cactus that is usually less than 40 cm (16 in) tall. It is characterized by simple, depressed globose to short-cylindric stems with 21 ribs. Each areole has around 21 spines, with 4 stout, flattened, and gray-colored central spines arranged in the pattern of a cross. The flowers are orchid to rose purple and appear from March to April, and mature into oval fruits that are pink to yellow.

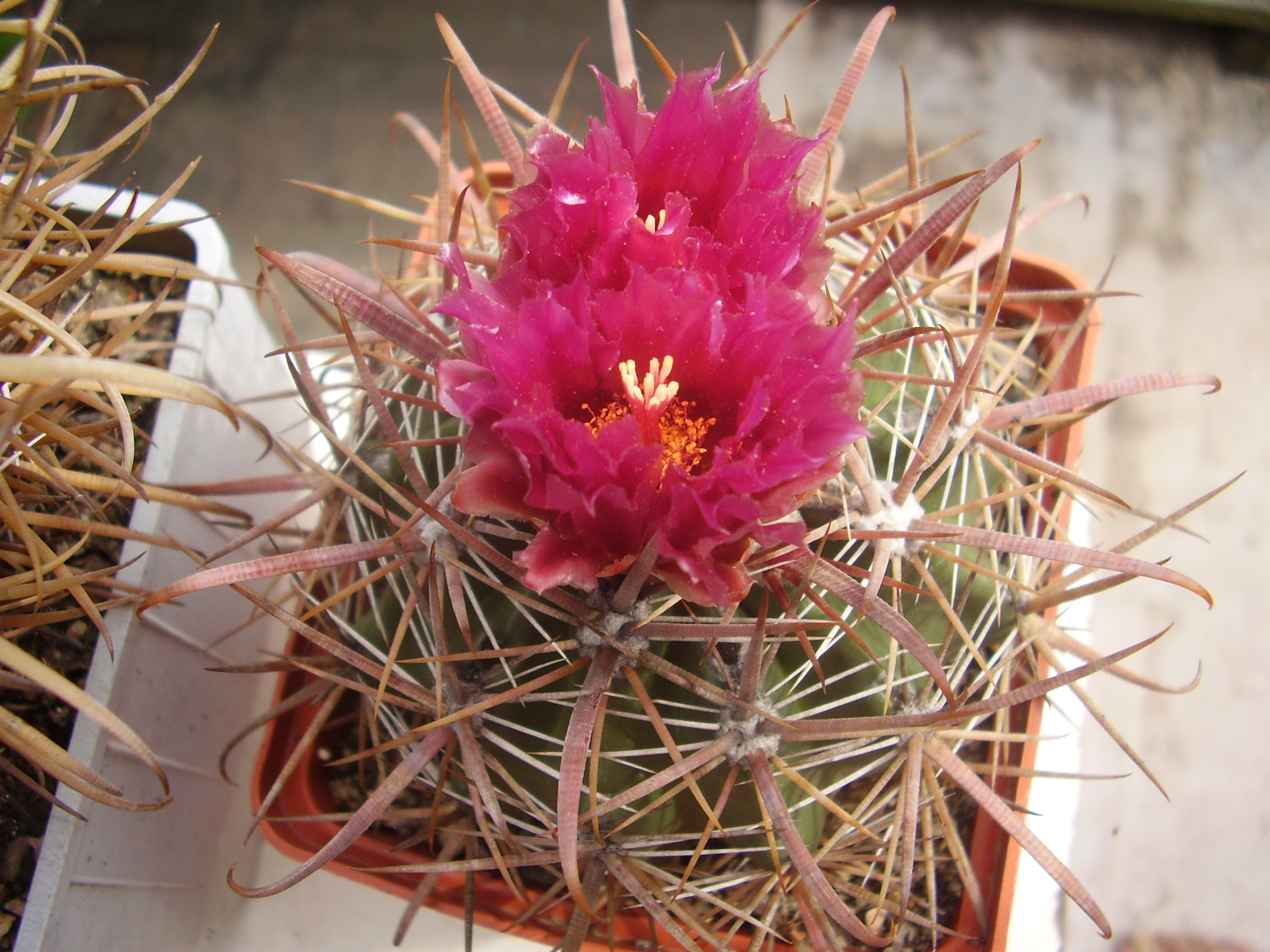
Ferocactus fordii from collection of Yuriy Shostak (Mykolaiv, Ukraine)

== Taxonomy ==
=== Infrataxa ===
- Ferocactus fordii var. fordii – The autonymic infraspecies, ranging from San Quintín, Baja California to the Vizcaíno Peninsula in Baja California Sur. Also known as subsp. fordii.
- Ferocactus fordii subsp. borealis N.P.Taylor – A short-spined and shorter in stature infraspecies, commonly known as Ford's northern barrel cactus, ranging from San Quintín to El Rosario. Recognized by Kew's Plants of the World Online, while the San Diego Natural History Museum in their 2016 Baja Checklist by Rebman et al. suggests the subspecies may deserve recognition if more taxonomic study is conducted.
- Ferocactus fordii var. grandiflorus G.E. Linds. – A Baja California Sur endemic infraspecies, commonly known as large-flowered Ford barrel cactus or the Vizcaíno barrel cactus that ranges from Bahía Tortugas south to Punta Abreojos. It has red or orange flowers. This variety is recognized by the San Diego Natural History Museum in their 2016 Baja Checklist by Rebman et al. Also known as Ferocactus chrysacanthus subsp. grandiflorus (G.E. Linds.) N.P. Taylor, which is accepted by Kew's Plants of the World Online, and recognized by Joël Lodé as synonymous with Ferocactus gracilis.

Undescribed

- Ferocactus fordii var. brevispinus Nomen nudum (catalog name) – An undescribed name used in horticultural catalogs to indicate a cultivated morphological form with shorter spines.

Plants sometimes assigned to Ferocactus chrysacanthus from Isla Natividad, which is located midway between the F. c. ssp. chrysacanthus on Cedros Island and the subspecies grandiflorus of the Vizcaíno Peninsula, are in fact Ferocactus fordii because of their distinctly purple flowers.

== Distribution ==
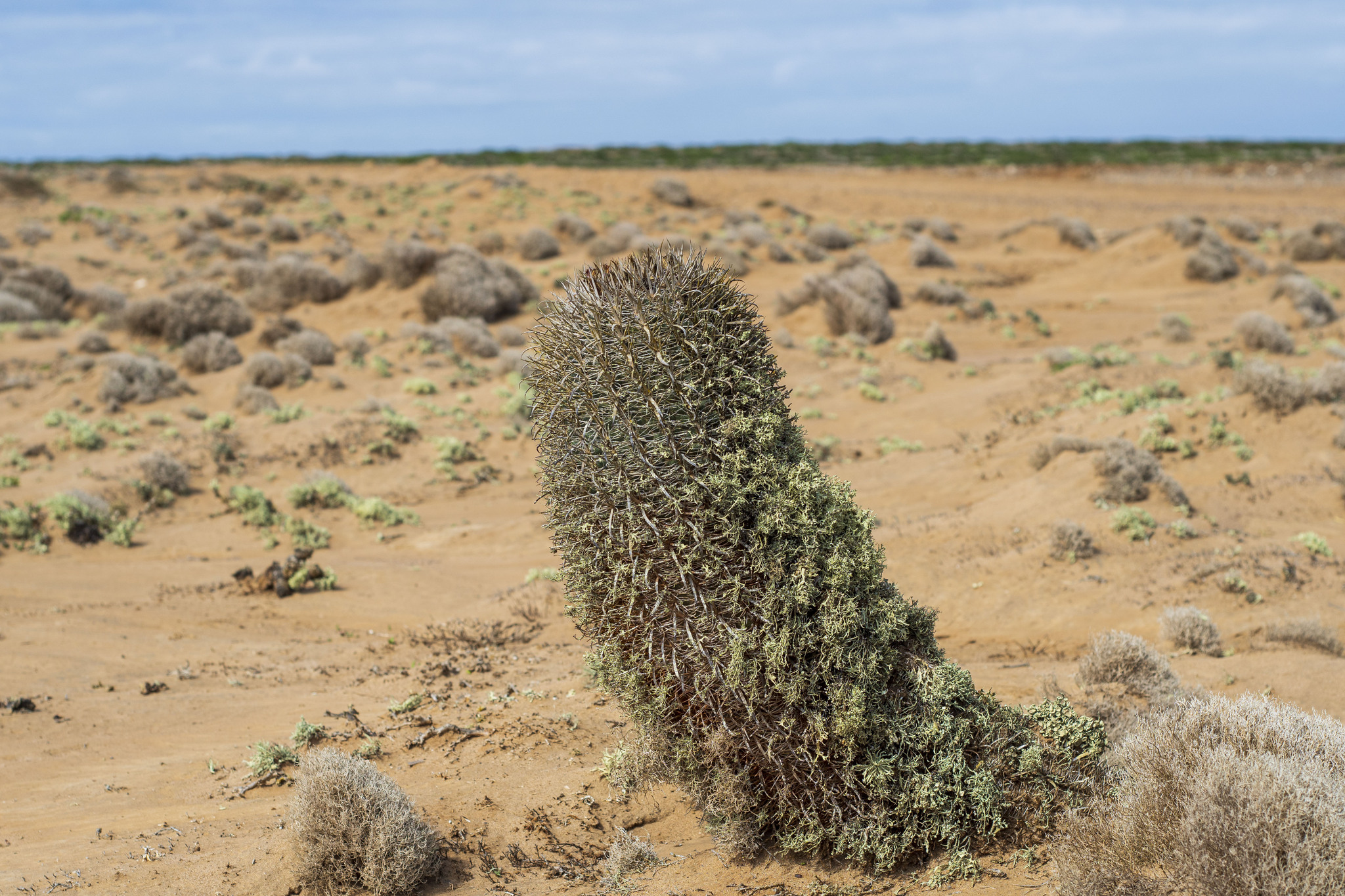
An old plant of Ferocactus fordii borealis at Punta Baja, Baja California.

Ferocactus fordii is endemic to the Baja California Peninsula and its two constituent states in Mexico, and is found along the Pacific Coast. It occurs from the vicinity of San Quintín, Baja California to the town of Guerrero Negro on the Vizcaíno Peninsula of far northern Baja California Sur, and is also on Isla San Martín and Isla Natividad. When var. grandiflorus is included, it ranges further south to Bahía Tortugas and Punta Abreojos.

== Cultivation ==
In cultivation it requires the protection of glass.
