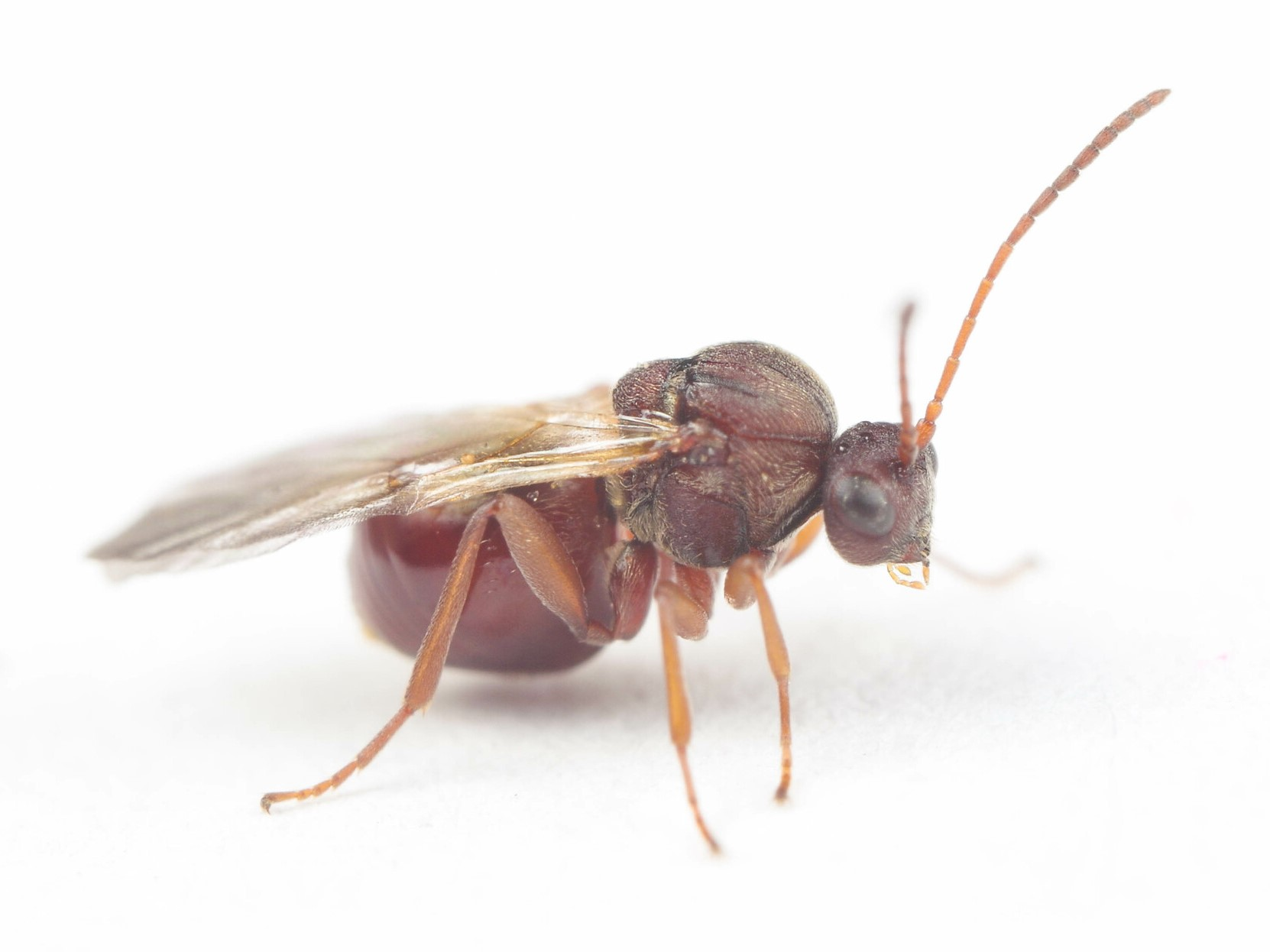
- Heteroecus pacificus

Scientific classification
- Kingdom: Animalia
- Phylum: Arthropoda
- Class: Insecta
- Order: Hymenoptera
- Family: Cynipidae
- Tribe: Cynipini
- Genus: Heteroecus; Kinsey, 1922

= Heteroecus =

Genus of wasps

Heteroecus is a genus of gall wasps in the family Cynipidae. There are about seven described species in the genus Heteroecus. They are only found on oaks (Quercus) of the section Protobalanus.

== Species ==
These seven species belong to the genus Heteroecus:

- Heteroecus crescentus (Lyon)
- Heteroecus dasydactyli (Ashmead, 1896) – woolly gall wasp
- Heteroecus devorus (Lyon)
- Heteroecus lyoni – Lyon's gall wasp
- Heteroecus melanoderma Kinsey, 1922 – golden gall wasp
- Heteroecus pacificus (Ashmead, 1896) – beaked spindle gall wasp
- Heteroecus sanctaeclarae – mushroom gall wasp
