= Cedros Island =

Island in Baja California, Mexico

- Location within Baja California Location within Mexico

Geography
- Location: Pacific Ocean off Baja California
- Area: 348 km^{2} (134 sq mi)
- Highest elevation: 1,205 m (3953 ft)

Administration
- Mexico
- State: Baja California

Demographics
- Population: 1,350

Cedros Island (Isla de Cedros, "island of cedars" in Spanish) is an island in the Pacific Ocean belonging to the state of Baja California, Mexico. The dry and rocky island had a population of 1,350 in 2005 and has an area of 348 square kilometres (134 sq mi) which includes the area of several small nearby islands. Cedros Island is mountainous, reaching a maximum elevation of 1,205 metres (3,953 ft). The economy is based on commercial fishing and salt production. Cedros has a distinctive flora and the traces of some of the earliest human beings in the New World. The ocean around the island is popular with sport fishermen.

There was human presence of the island already about 11,000 years ago. The Native American inhabitants when the island was first visited by Spanish explorers in the 16th century called it Huamalgua, the "Island of Fogs." The native inhabitants have been given the name Huamalgueños by modern day scholars. They were relocated to the mainland of Baja California by Jesuit missionaries in 1732 and ceased to exist as an identifiable people.

== Geography ==
Cedros Island is located in Ensenada Municipality, off the west coast of the Mexican state of Baja California, from which it is separated by 100-kilometre-wide (62 mi) Sebastián Vizcaíno Bay. It is 22 km (14 mi) northwest of Punta Eugenia in Mulegé Municipality – the westernmost point of the state of Baja California Sur mainland. It also lies 15 km (9.32 mi) north of Isla Natividad (off Punta Eugenia, and also part of Mulegé Municipality) from which it is separated by the Canal de Keller, and some 500 km (311 mi) from San Diego. The island has an area of 348.295 square kilometres (134.477 sq mi), being the fourth-largest island in Mexico (following Tiburón Island, Isla Ángel de la Guarda, and Cozumel). It has a maximum length of approximately 38 km (24 mi), and a maximum width of about 17 km (11 mi).

Between Cedros Island and Isla Natividad runs the 28th parallel north, which defines the border between the Mexican states of Baja California and Baja California Sur. The Islas San Benito to the west, about 25 km (16 mi) west and 3.899 km^{2} (1.505 sq mi) in area, are administratively part of Cedros Island.

The Isla de Cedros was named by early Spanish explorers who mistakenly associated the large amounts of redwood and cedar driftwood arriving with the California current for local pines visible on the crest of the island.

The two main elevations are Cedros hill, located at the south-center of the island, and Pico Gill to the north.

== Climate ==
Cedros Island has a desert climate, BWh in the Köppen climate classification system and BWab (desert, hot summers, warm winters) in the Trewartha climate classification. Most precipitation occurs during the winter.

Climate data for Isla Cedros 10 metres (33 ft) above sea level 28°08′N 115°10′W
Month	Jan	Feb	Mar	Apr	May	Jun	Jul	Aug	Sep	Oct	Nov	Dec	Year
Mean daily maximum °C (°F)	22.8 (73.0)	23.4 (74.1)	23.6 (74.5)	25.3 (77.5)	25.7 (78.3)	26.2 (79.2)	28.6 (83.5)	29.4 (84.9)	29.5 (85.1)	28.6 (83.5)	25.7 (78.3)	23.2 (73.8)	26.0 (78.8)
Daily mean °C (°F)	18.6 (65.5)	19.1 (66.4)	19.2 (66.6)	20.5 (68.9)	21.0 (69.8)	21.7 (71.1)	24.0 (75.2)	24.9 (76.8)	25.0 (77.0)	23.8 (74.8)	21.4 (70.5)	19.0 (66.2)	21.5 (70.7)
Mean daily minimum °C (°F)	14.3 (57.7)	14.7 (58.5)	14.7 (58.5)	15.7 (60.3)	16.3 (61.3)	17.3 (63.1)	19.4 (66.9)	20.5 (68.9)	20.5 (68.9)	19.1 (66.4)	17.0 (62.6)	15.1 (59.2)	17.1 (62.8)
Average precipitation mm (inches)	10 (0.4)	10 (0.4)	5.1 (0.2)	2.5 (0.1)	0 (0)	0 (0)	0 (0)	0 (0)	2.5 (0.1)	5.1 (0.2)	5.1 (0.2)	10 (0.4)	53 (2.1)

The only weather station on the island is located on the southeastern coast. The northern and western parts of the island are several degrees cooler because the cold waters surrounding the island cause heavy fog and clouds, especially during spring and summer. The condensation from the fog permits lusher vegetation to flourish, similar to the "fog oases" (lomas) of the arid Pacific Coast of South America. Precipitation is also greater at the higher elevations of the island, reaching possible annual totals of 200 millimetres (7.9 in). Rarely, heavy rains caused by unstable tropical air masses and chubascos cause flooding.

== Population and settlements ==
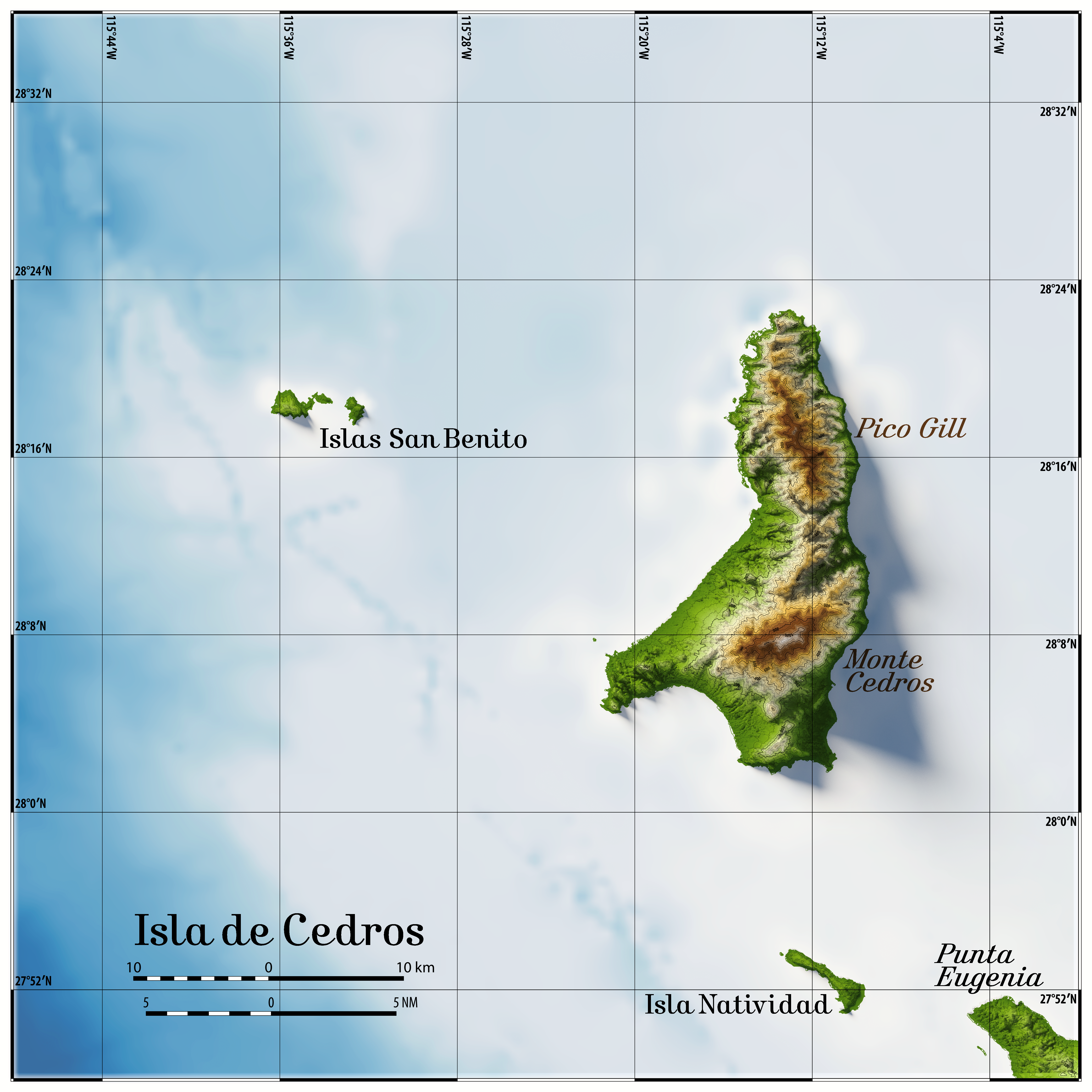
Topographic map of Cedros Island

It constitutes one of the 24 subdivisions (delegaciones) of the municipio of Ensenada. The 2005 census showed a total population of 1,350 persons.

The borough "seat" is Cedros, also known as Isla Cedros or Cedros town ("Pueblo Cedros"), on the southeast coast. The town was founded by fishermen in 1922, and in 2010 the town had a population of 747 people. The local economy is dependent on fishing, and largely associated with Pescadores Nacionales de Abulón, the lobster and abalone fishing cooperative based on the island.

The second town is Puerto Morro Redondo (in short, El Morro), close to the southeastern point of the island, El Morro. It is a "company town," built by the joint Mexican Government and Mitsubishi Corporation to house the workers of the salt-transshipment facility on the island. Salt from the salt evaporation ponds of Guerrero Negro on the Baja California peninsula is taken by barge to a deepwater salt dock near Puerto Morro Redondo, at the south end of Cedros Island, where it is loaded onto ships for export. There is regularly scheduled air service to the island from Ensenada, departing every Monday and Wednesday, and landing at an airstrip at the south end, adjacent to the "company town," while a 10 km (6 mi) road leads to "Pueblo Cedros". Open launch rides across the channel between Cedros and the mainland can also be arranged at the Abarrotes Ramales store in Bahia Tortugas, but travellers opting for this transport should be prepared to have a flexible schedule with several extra days in case of inclement weather conditions in the Channel.

The remaining settlements are smaller. Jerusalem is just west of El Morro, but on the western side of the airport, with regularly arranged residential units. It is frequently considered part of El Morro.

Lomas Blancas, a mining town with 17 buildings, is located between Cedros town and El Morro.

San Agustín, a typical fishing village with about 20 buildings, is located 1 km (0.6 mi) northeast of the southwestern point of the island, Cabo San Agustín.

La Colorada, on the southwest coast, with about 10 buildings, is 4 km (2 mi) north of San Agustín.

Wayle, 15 buildings on the western side of the southern bight Bahía del Sur, is 3 km (1.9 mi) northeast of San Agustín.

The mining town of Punta Norte (about 25 buildings) is located on the northeast coast, 3.5 km (2.2 mi) southeast of the northern end of the island, which is also called Punta Norte. Two kilometres (1 mi) to the southeast is Los Crestones mine.

List of settlements and locations:

1. Cedros, 28°05′45.5″N 115°11′12.4″W
2. Puerto Morro Redondo, 28°02′18.6″N 115°11′12.0″W
3. Jerusalem, 28°02′24″N 115°11′29″W
4. Lomas Blancas, 28°04′44″N 115°11′07″W
5. San Agustín, 28°04′54.6″N 115°20′20.6″W
6. La Colorada, 28°07′01.2″N 115°21′07.0″W
7. Wayle, 28°05′34″N 115°18′47″W
8. Punta Norte, 28°21′15″N 115°11′39″W

== Archaeology ==
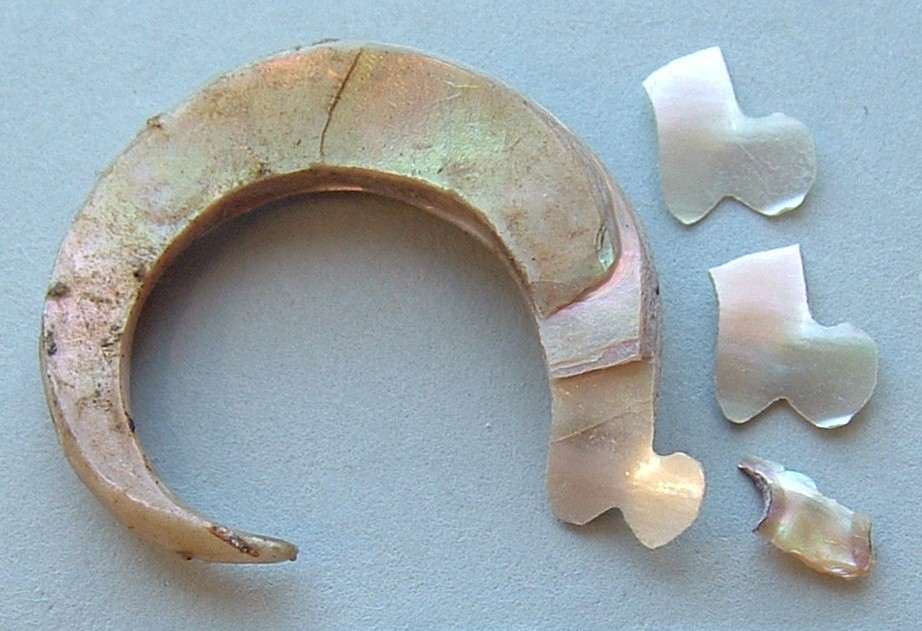
Native American shell fish hook from California. Auckland Museum

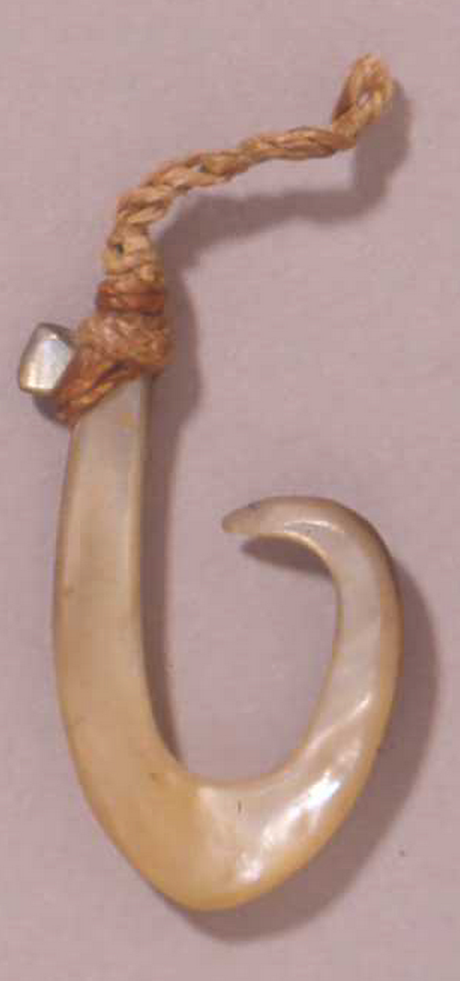
Mother of pearl fish hook. Collected from the Society Islands during Captain Cook's voyages to the Pacific, 1768-1780 Australian Museum

The long-held theory that the first human beings in the Americas arrived by land through an ice-free corridor in western Canada has been called into question by archaeological discoveries along the Pacific coastlines of North and South America. Many scientists now believe that the earliest inhabitants arrived by boat, and findings on Cedros Island bolster that theory. The Clovis culture, which began about 11,200 BCE, is the earliest universally acknowledged evidence of man in the Americas; but the remains of ancient people dating to earlier than 10,000 BCE have been found on Cedros Island. Cedros Island was attractive to humans because of its rich marine environment and its relative abundance of water compared to most of the desert coastline of Baja California. The early people of Cedros Island fished, gathered shellfish, and hunted seals, sea lions, and seabirds. Ancient spear points and shell fishhooks found on Cedros are similar to those found in a semi-circle of the Pacific coastline from Okinawa to Peru. The fishhooks made of shell found on Cedros Island indicate a marine, sea-going culture some 6,000 years before similar cultures are known to have existed on the coast and islands of California.

=== Earliest fishhooks in the Americas ===
The discovery of the earliest fishhooks in the Americas was reported from Cedros Island in 2017. They date to about 11,000 B.P. The people making these fishhooks were fishing for deepwater species, which indicates that they were using boats.

Similar fishhooks have also been reported from Isla Espíritu Santo, also in Baja California.

== History ==
Spanish colonial period

In 1539, when the Spanish expedition led by Francisco de Ulloa landed on the island, it encountered several villages with populations at each estimated in the hundreds. Finding it difficult to reach the remaining natives on the island, the Jesuit missionaries practiced Indian reductions and brought them all to Misión San Ignacio Kadakaamán, in San Ignacio on the Baja California mainland in 1732.

Hunters seeking seals and sea otters worked out the island between 1790 and 1850.

20th century

Gold and copper mining took place near Punta Norte between 1890 and 1914. The fishing village and cannery at Puerto Cedros were established in 1920. The fishing cooperative was founded in 1943, and the deepwater salt dock at the south end of the island was built in 1966. The island was mapped in detail by Mexican and U.S. geologists during the 1970s.

== Natural history ==
Cedros Island is at most some 38 kilometres (23.6 mi) long in N-S direction and 6.4 to 8 kilometres (4 to 5 mi) wide in the northern half; the southern end is some 17 kilometres (11 mi) wide in a NW-SE direction. The island consists of a variety of sedimentary, metamorphic, and igneous rocks, including part of an ophiolite complex and high-pressure, low temperature blueschists. Most of the rocks are of Mesozoic age, though some late Cenozoic strata crop out near the town in the southeastern corner of the island. Its highest peak, Monte Cedros, has an elevation of 1,205 metres (3,953 ft).

=== Flora ===
The most common vegetation for more than 90 percent of the land on the island is desert scrub of many different species. The lower elevations, especially the south, receive very sparse rainfall. However, the northern and western parts of the island are often shrouded in fog, and some plants have adapted to receiving moisture from fog. The fog, plus the slightly greater rainfall at higher elevations, has permitted the existence of Monterey pine forests at elevations of 500 metres (1,600 ft) to 800 metres (2,600 ft) where the influence of the fog is most intense. The pine forests are scattered and only cover 0.46 percent of the total area of the island. The pines grow to a height of up to 10 metres (33 ft). California juniper are also found at similar altitudes, covering 0.05 percent of the land area.

At the highest elevations of the island, above and mixed in with the pine forests, chaparral vegetation is found. The chaparral averages 3 metres (9.8 ft) in height and consists of several woody species including Quercus cedrosensis, the Cedar Island live oak. Chaparral covers 2.4 percent of the land area of Cedros Island.

Vargas or El Aguaje de Vargas is the most important spring, with a flow of 180 drums of 200 L or 55 US gal every 12 hours; springs on the island are usually marked by groves of palm trees.

=== Fauna ===
Large sea lion colonies are found on the rocks on the west side as well as the anchorage on the north end.

There are feral goats on Cedros. Unlike on other islands in the region (notably Guadalupe Island), they do not seem to have had a significant impact on the island ecosystem. This would be due to the fact that Cedros is on the continental shelf close to the coast and, at least temporarily, it was connected to the mainland during the last ice age when sea levels were lower than today. Then, and as a consequence of this, there are native Cedros herbivores, such as Cedros Island mule deer which on one hand compete with the goat population for food and presumably have kept it from increasing beyond carrying capacity, and on the other hand forced the native plants to keep their defenses against herbivores, unlike plants on islands without megaherbivores, which tend to lack those defenses.

Fish are abundant around Cedros Island. California yellowtail, a subspecies of yellowtail amberjack, are very plentiful in the waters around the island, as it is their breeding ground. These fish like to live in the kelp beds of the island. Other fish, such as calico bass and sheepshead are also very plentiful near the island.

=== Endemism ===
Cedros Island is home to a number of taxa that are endemic or occur in very few places outside the island. These include:

Animals

- Cedros side-blotched lizard, Uta stansburiana concinna – endemic
- Cedros Island Bewick's wren, Thryomanes bewickii cerroensis – near-endemic
- Cedros Island mule deer, Odocoileus hemionus cerrosensis – endemic
- Cedros Island brush rabbit, Sylvilagus bachmani cerrosensis – endemic
- Cedros Island cactus mouse, Peromyscus eremicus cedrosensis – endemic
- Cedros Island Gophersnake, Pituophis (vertebralis) insulanus – endemic:

Plants

- Cryptantha maritima var. cedrosensis – endemic
- Dudleya cedrosensis – endemic
- Dudleya pachyphytum (Cedros Island Liveforever) – endemic
- Eriogonum molle (Cedros soft buckwheat) – endemic
- Ferocactus chrysacanthus – endemic
- Harfordia macroptera ssp. fruticosa – endemic
- Linanthus veatchii – endemic
- Lotus cedrosensis – endemic
- Mammillaria goodridgei var. goodridgei – endemic
- Mammillaria goodridgei var. rectispina – endemic
- Diplacus stellatus – endemic
- Monardella thymifolia – endemic
- Penstemon cerrosensis (Cedros Island penstemon) – endemic
- Pinus radiata var. binata (Guadalupe Island Monterey pine) – near-endemic; possibly separable as var./ssp. cedrosensis and in this case endemic.
- Porophyllum cedrense – endemic
- Quercus cedrosensis (Cedros Island oak) — near-endemic
- Rhus integrifolia var. cedrosensis – endemic
- Salvia cedrosensis (Cedros Island sage) – endemic
- Senecio cedrosensis – endemic
- Verbesina hastata – endemic
- Xylonagra arborea ssp. arborea – endemic

== See also ==
- History of the west coast of North America
- Isla de Cedros Airport
