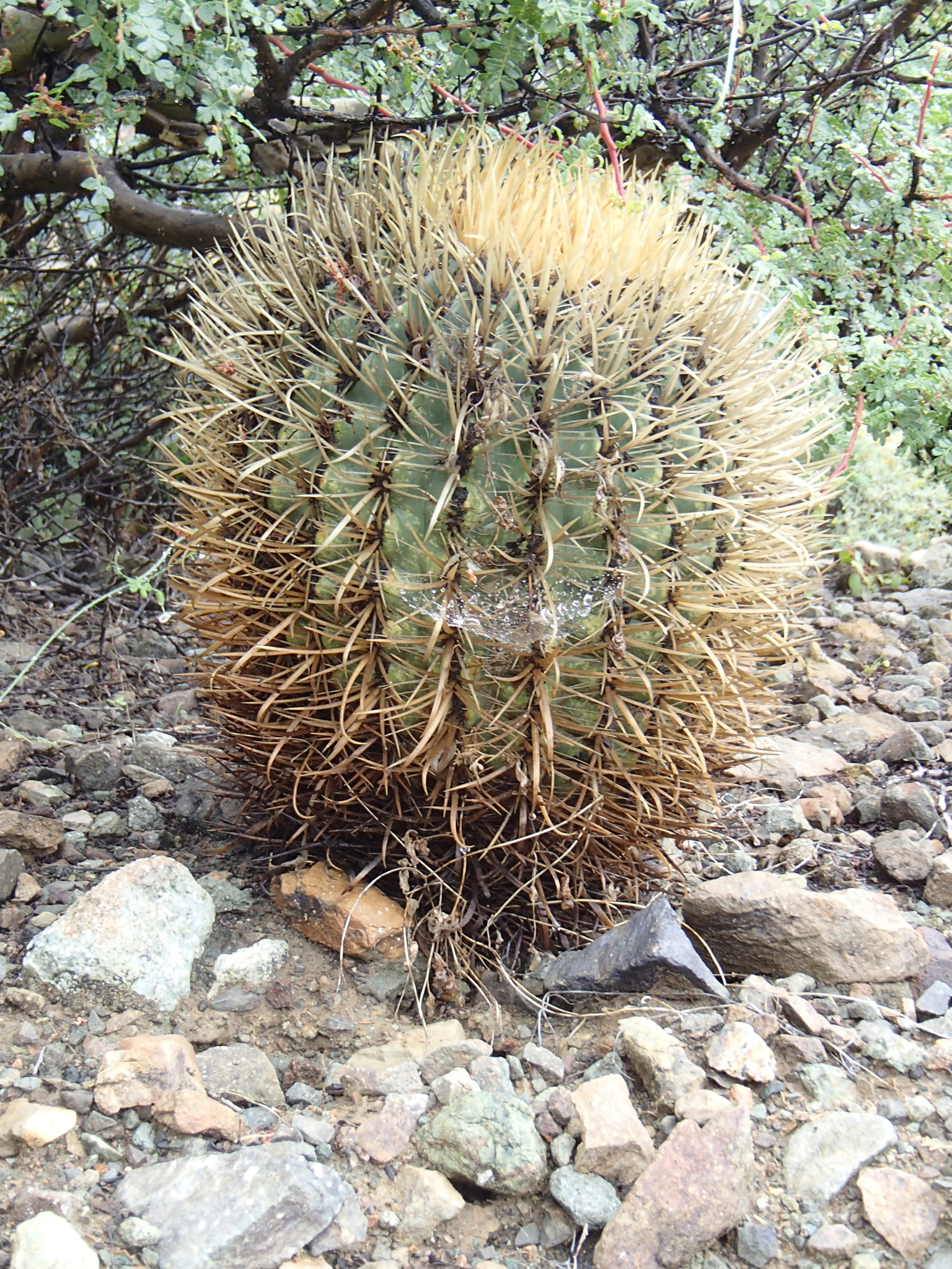
- Ferocactus chrysacanthus subsp. chrysacanthus on Cedros Island

Conservation status
- Endangered (IUCN 3.1)

Scientific classification
- Kingdom: Plantae
- Clade: Embryophytes
- Clade: Tracheophytes
- Clade: Spermatophytes
- Clade: Angiosperms
- Clade: Eudicots
- Order: Caryophyllales
- Family: Cactaceae
- Subfamily: Cactoideae
- Genus: Ferocactus
- Species: F. chrysacanthus

Binomial name
- Ferocactus chrysacanthus (Orcutt) Britton & Rose

Synonyms
- Basionym: Echinocactus chrysacanthus Orcutt; Synonyms for subsp. grandiflorus: Ferocactus fordii var. grandiflorus G.E. Linds.; Ferocactus × grandiflorus Unger; Ferocactus grandiflorus Unger

= Ferocactus chrysacanthus =

Species of cactus

Ferocactus chrysacanthus, commonly known as the Cedros barrel cactus, is an endangered species of cactus endemic to the islands of Cedros and West San Benito off the Pacific coast of Baja California, Mexico.

== Description ==
It is a solitary-stemmed barrel cactus with a globose to short cylindrical shape, and grows to 1 m (3.3 ft) tall and 30 centimeters in diameter, with around 21 tuberous ribs. The spines can be white, yellow, red, or occasionally gray. It has approximately 10 central spines that are flattened, occasionally curved like a hook, and can grow up to 5 centimeters long. It also has 4 to 12 or more radiating marginal spines, usually white and needle-like, sometimes bristle-like. The yellow to orange flowers bloom from June to July, and mature into yellow fruits. The bell-shaped flowers are red, yellow, or orange, reaching lengths of up to 4.5 centimeters and diameters of 4 centimeters. Its yellow fruits, up to 3 centimeters long, are fleshy and open with a basal pore. Sometimes recognized is the subspecies grandiflorus, which has orange to red flowers up to 6 cm (2.4 in) long and is native to the Vizcaíno Peninsula of Baja California Sur.

=== Subspecies ===
There are two accepted subspecies:

Image	Name	Description and Distribution
	Ferocactus chrysacanthus subsp. chrysacanthus	The autonymic subspecies, endemic to Cedros Island and West San Benito Island in Baja California.
	Ferocactus chrysacanthus subsp. grandiflorus (G.E. Linds.) N.P. Taylor	A Baja California Sur endemic infraspecies, commonly known as the large-flowered barrel cactus or Vizcaíno barrel cactus that ranges from Bahía Tortugas south to Punta Abreojos on the Vizcaíno Peninsula. It has orange to red flowers. This subspecies is recognized by Kew's Plants of the World Online, the IUCN Red List, and The New Cactus Lexicon. Also known by the basionym Ferocactus fordii var. grandiflorus G.E. Linds. which is recognized by the San Diego Natural History Museum in their 2016 Baja Checklist by Rebman et al. It is recognized by Joël Lodé as synonymous with Ferocactus gracilis.

Plants sometimes assigned to Ferocactus chrysacanthus on Isla Natividad, which is located midway between the nominate subspecies on Cedros Island and the subspecies grandiflorus of the Vizcaíno Peninsula, are in fact Ferocactus fordii because of their distinctly purple flowers.

== Distribution ==
This species is found along the Pacific west coast in the Mexican state of Baja California Sur, including the offshore islands of Cedros and San Benito.

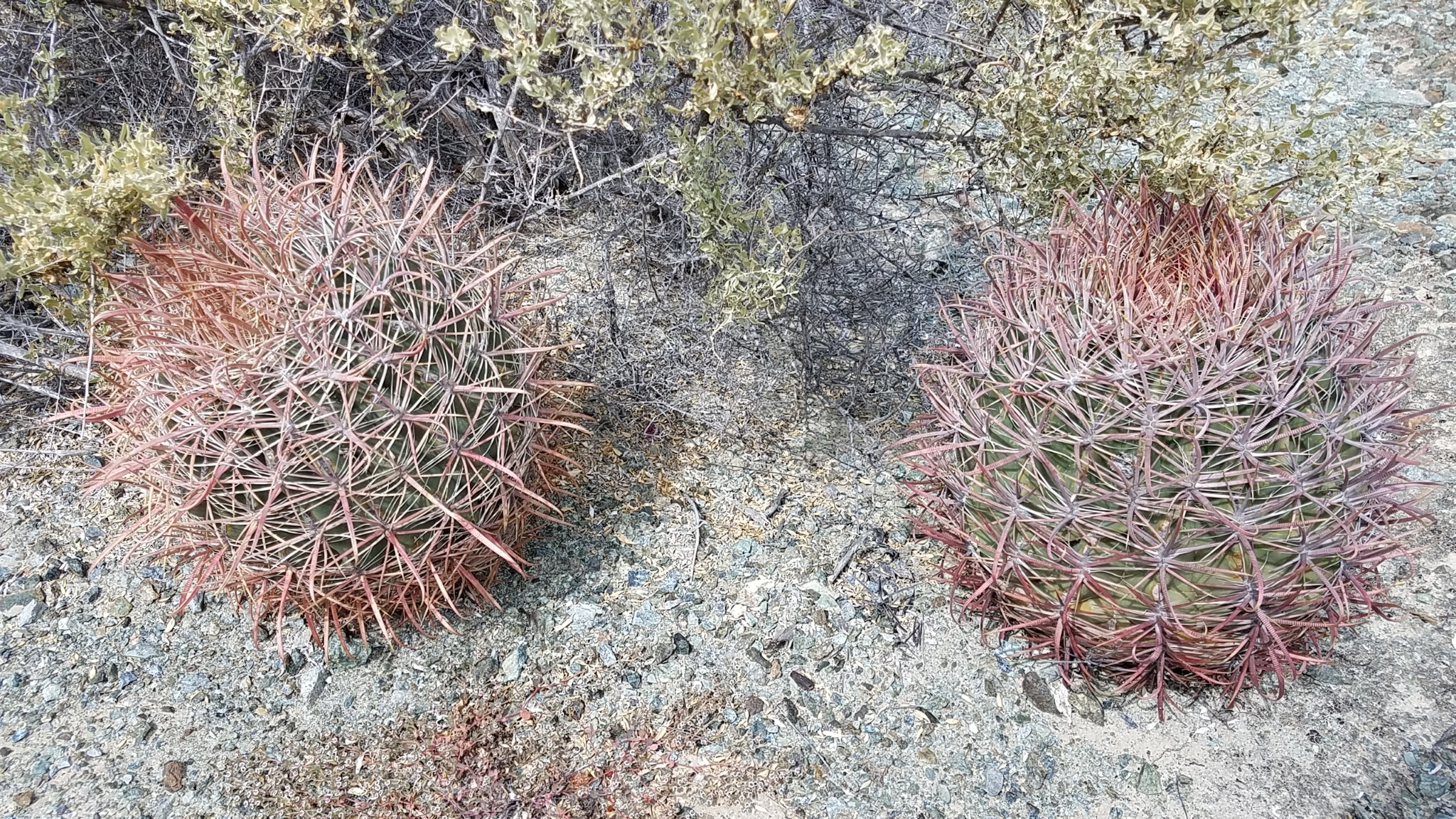
Ferocactus chrysacanthus subsp. grandiflorus growing in Puerto Nuevo, Baja California Sur, Mexico

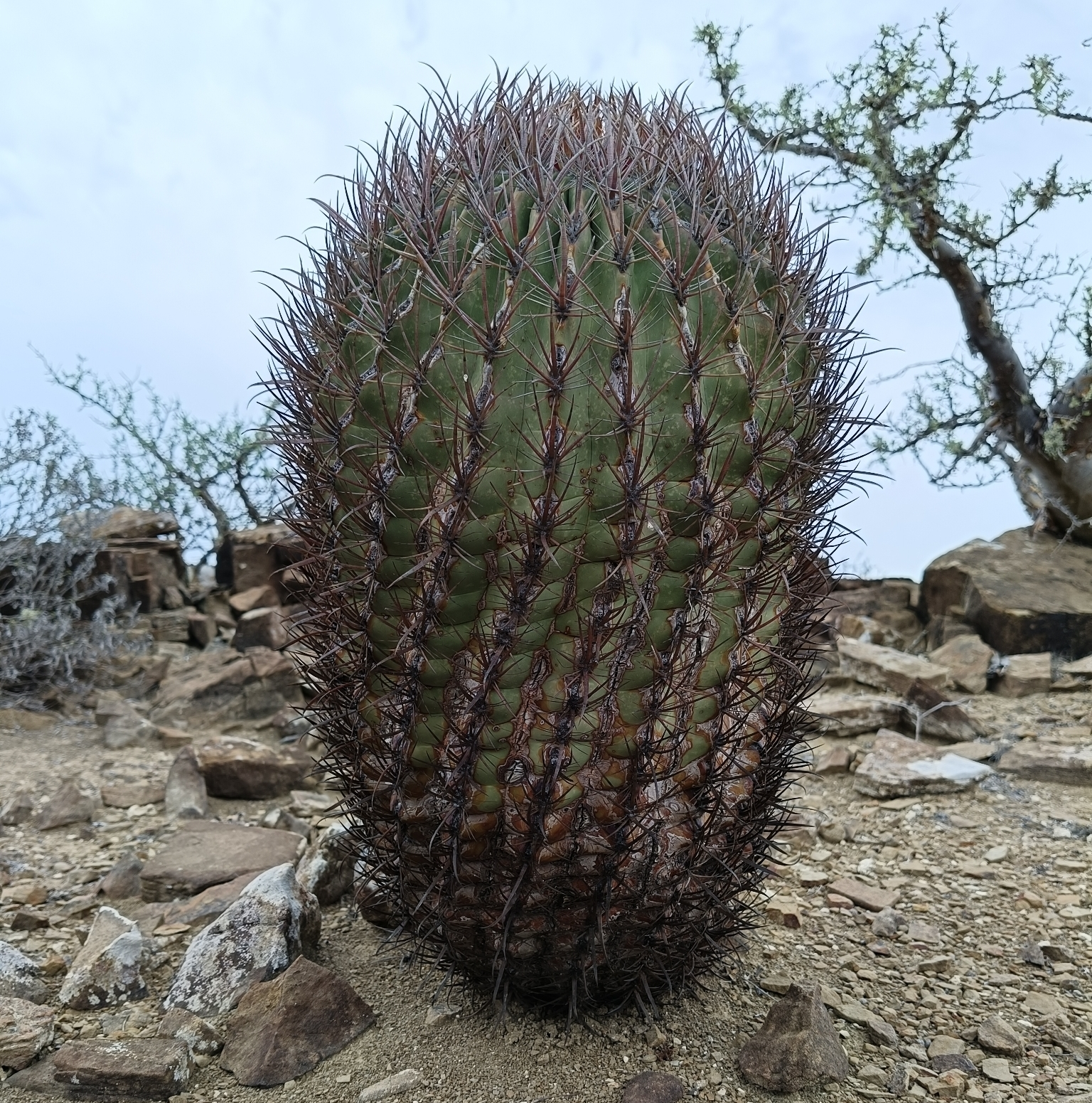
Ferocactus chrysacanthus subsp. grandiflorus habitat in Los Santitos, Baja California Sur, Mexico

== Taxonomy ==
The type specimen was collected on Cedros Island in 1894 and described as Echinocactus chrysacanthus in 1899 by Charles Russell Orcutt, it was later placed in the genus Ferocactus by Nathaniel Lord Britton and Joseph Nelson Rose in 1922. The specific epithet "chrysacanthus" means 'golden-yellow-spined'.
