= Cedros Island mule deer =

Conservation status
- Vulnerable (IUCN 3.1)

Scientific classification
- Kingdom: Animalia
- Phylum: Chordata
- Class: Mammalia
- Order: Artiodactyla
- Family: Cervidae
- Subfamily: Capreolinae
- Genus: Odocoileus
- Species: O. hemionus
- Subspecies: O. h. cerrosensis

Trinomial name
- Odocoileus hemionus cerrosensis Merriam, 1898

Subspecies of deer

The Cedros Island mule deer (Odocoileus hemionus cerrosensis) is a subspecies of mule deer found only on Cedros Island off the coast of Baja California. Only about 50 individuals remain, with no captive population. Its behavior is similar to that of other subspecies of mule deer. The subspecies is threatened by feral dogs and poaching.

== Anatomy ==
The Cedros island mule deer shows a reduction in body size and antler size compared to mainland deer, which is an effect of isolation in a relatively small island, according to the "island rule" of Leigh Van Valen. There are also differences in fur coloration which distinguish cerrosensis from other mule deer, but most closely resembling Odocoileus hemionus fuliginatus.

== Subspecies classification ==
Cerrosensis is one of the ten named subspecies of mule deer. Although it may be a may be synonyms of O. h. eremicus or O. h. peninsulae, studies based on DNA samples, rather than observation, can show clearer objective differences. In the case of the Cedros deer, its status as a valid subspecies can be defended due to their endemicity to the island, morphological differences, and distinct mitochondrial patterns.

== Distribution ==
Cedros deer primarily occupy the northern side of the island, being less common in the southern section, where human activity is more prevalent.

== See also ==
- California mule deer
- Black-tailed deer
- Sitka deer
- White-tailed deer
