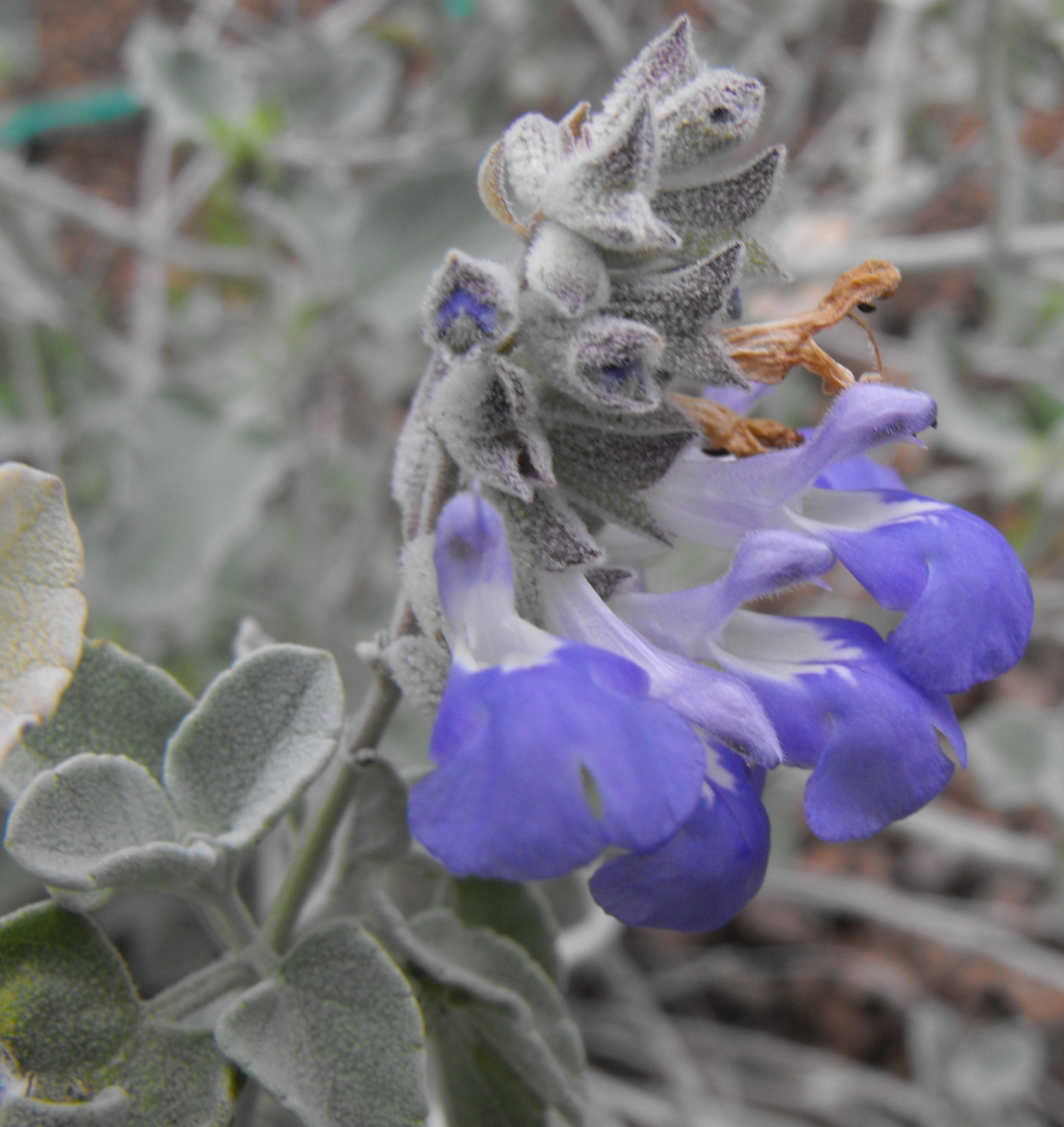

Scientific classification
- Kingdom: Plantae
- Clade: Embryophytes
- Clade: Tracheophytes
- Clade: Spermatophytes
- Clade: Angiosperms
- Clade: Eudicots
- Clade: Asterids
- Order: Lamiales
- Family: Lamiaceae
- Genus: Salvia
- Species: S. cedrosensis

Binomial name
- Salvia cedrosensis Greene

= Salvia cedrosensis =

Species of flowering plant

Salvia cedrosensis, commonly known as the Cedros Sage or Cedros Island Sage, is an evergreen fruticose perennial plant that is endemic to the western (Pacific) coast of Baja California in Mexico, native to the Vizcaino peninsula and Cedros Island.

== Description ==
It is found growing along dry riverbeds and canyons in rocky soil. In the wild it grows 60 cm (24 in) tall and wide, with small felt-like leaves that are whitish-grey and 2.5 cm (0.98 in). The flowers are violet-blue, with a pearly grey calyx and light violet around the edges.

== Cultivation ==
Michael Benedict, a botanist who also named the Cedros Island liveforever, selected a white-flowered cultivar known as 'Baja Blanca' which was introduced to nurseries by the Santa Barbara Botanical Garden. Like other members of the genus, this sage is prone to aphid infestations on new growth, but is otherwise quite insect and disease free. Excess watering, especially during summer, may lead to root rot. This plant is not tolerant of freezes.
