= Chubasco =

Violent squall with thunder and lightning

A chubasco is a violent squall with thunder and lightning, encountered during the rainy season along the Pacific coast of Mexico, Central America, and South America.

The word chubasco has its origins in the Portuguese word chuva which means rain. The monsoon storms that regularly pass over the southwestern United States, including the southern regions of Arizona and New Mexico, are sometimes referred to as chubascos. In the northern parts of Mexico, especially the northeast and north central, the word chubasco is used especially for suddenly occurring localised storms that produce very strong winds, sometimes as much as 90 miles per hour, and intense rains of as much as 5-6 inches in less than an hour. Straight-line winds can topple windmills and break large limbs of large, sometimes ancient trees. The phenomenon normally occurs during the hottest days of the year (May through October).
