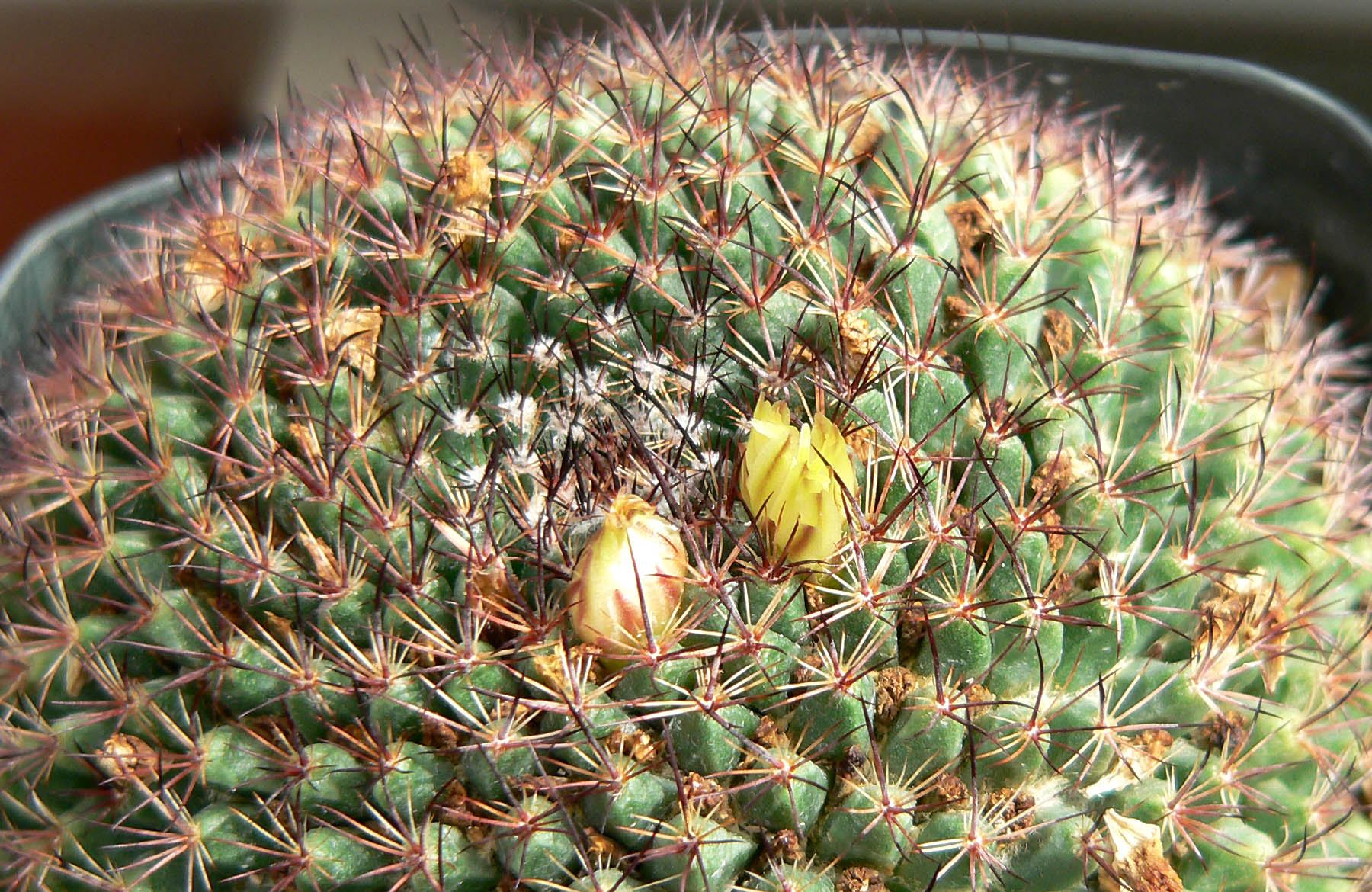

Scientific classification
- Kingdom: Plantae
- Clade: Embryophytes
- Clade: Tracheophytes
- Clade: Spermatophytes
- Clade: Angiosperms
- Clade: Eudicots
- Order: Caryophyllales
- Family: Cactaceae
- Subfamily: Cactoideae
- Genus: Mammillaria
- Species: M. brandegeei

Binomial name
- Mammillaria brandegeei (J.M.Coult.) K. Brandegee

Synonyms
- Mammillaria dawsonii

= Mammillaria brandegeei =

Species of cactus

Mammillaria brandegeei is a species of cactus in the subfamily Cactoideae.
