= Charles Fremont Pond =

United States Navy admiral

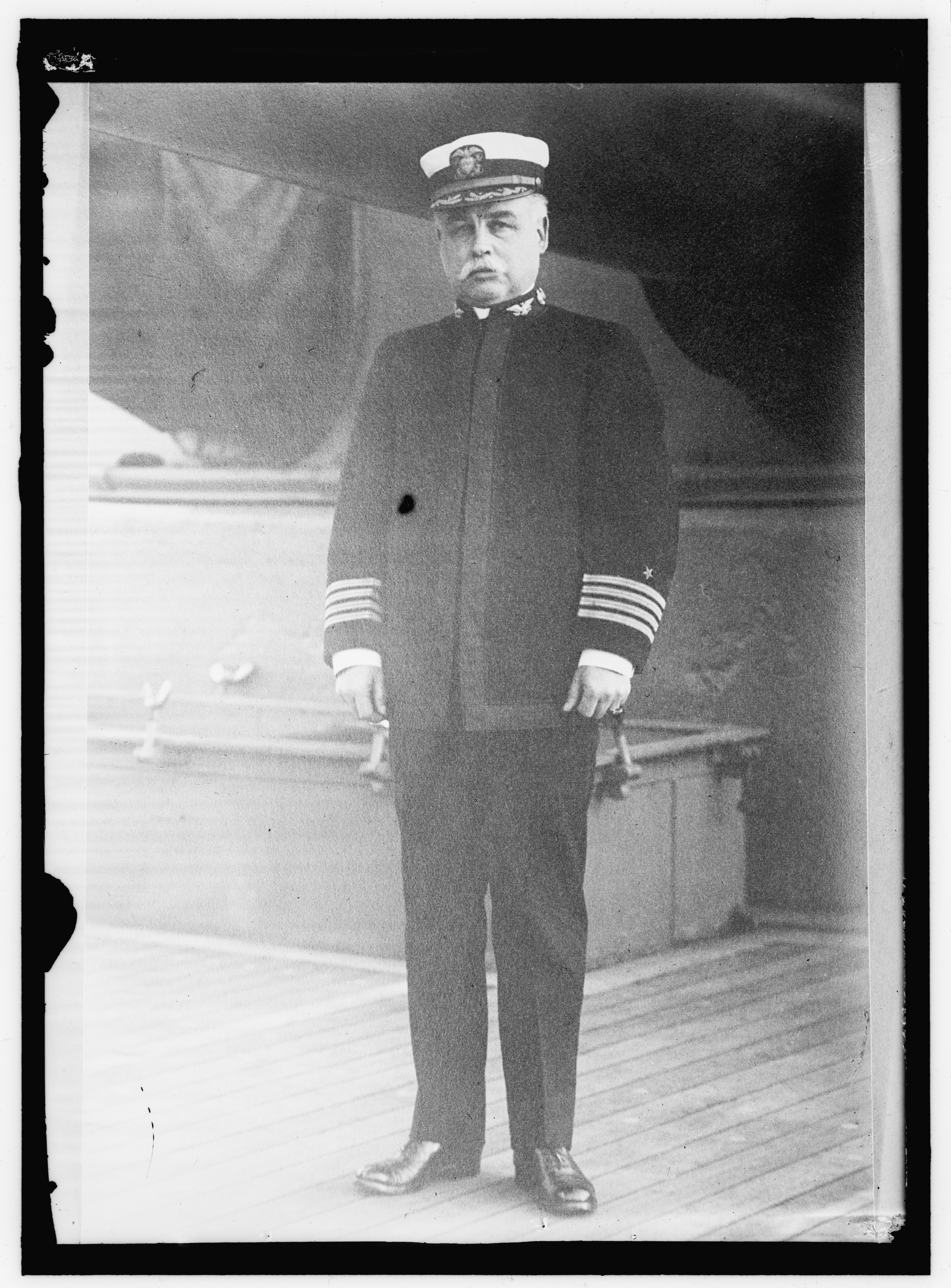
- Born: October 18, 1856; Brooklyn, Connecticut, U.S.
- Died: July 4, 1929 (aged 72); Berkeley, California, U.S.
- Relatives: Emma McHenry Keith (wife)
- Military career
- Allegiance: United States
- Branch: United States Navy
- Service years: 1879-1918
- Rank: Rear Admiral
- Nickname: Frog
- Commands: USS Iroquois, USS Pennsylvania

Charles Fremont Pond (October 18, 1856 – July 4, 1929) was a Rear Admiral in the United States Navy. Pond entered the US Naval academy on June 12, 1872, and graduated on June 20, 1876.

In 1889, while surveying the coast and islands of Baja California on the USS Ranger, Pond collected numerous plants, which he sent to his friend, botanist Edward Lee Greene. Greene named the cactus Mammillaria pondii in his honor.
