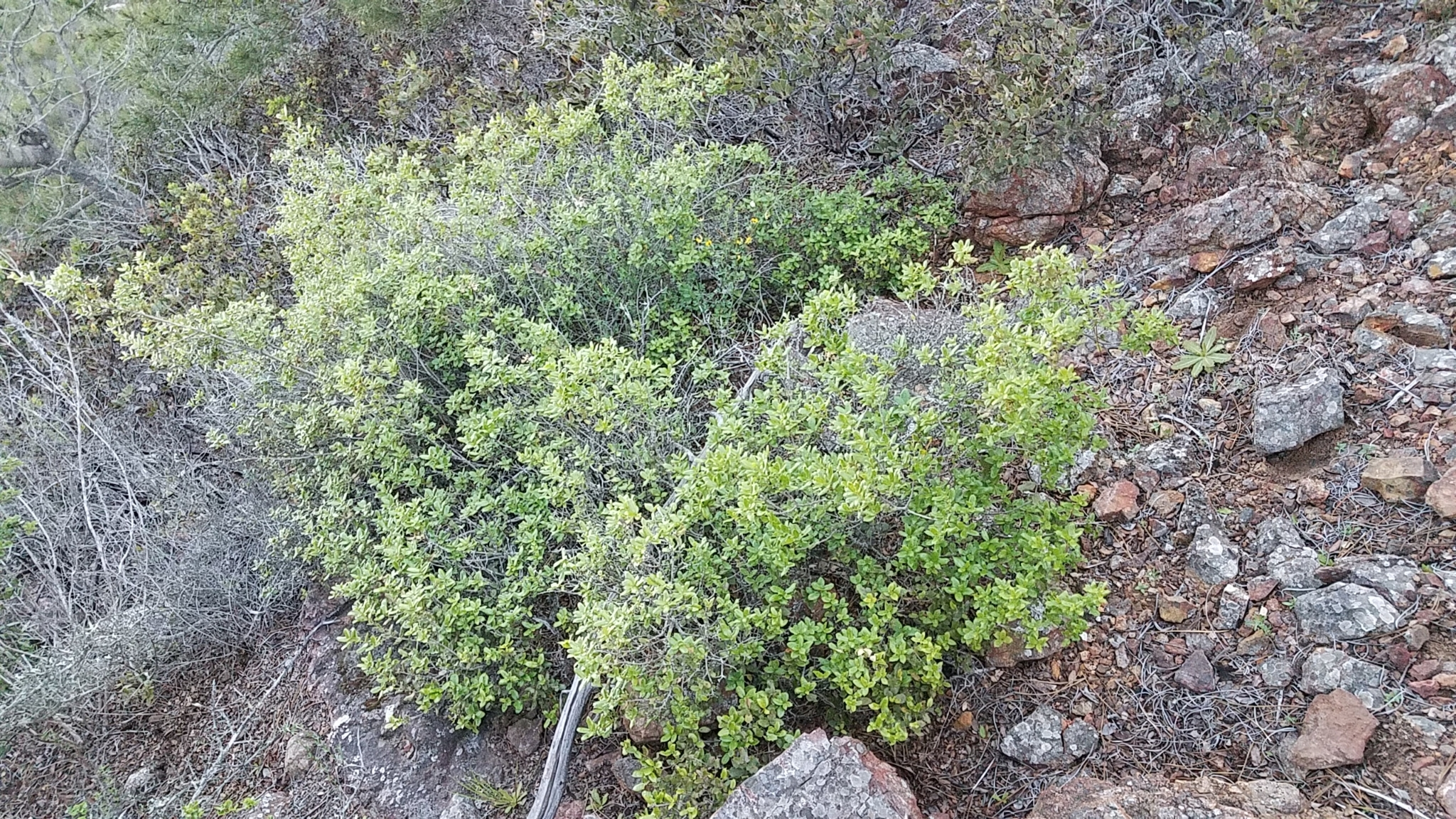

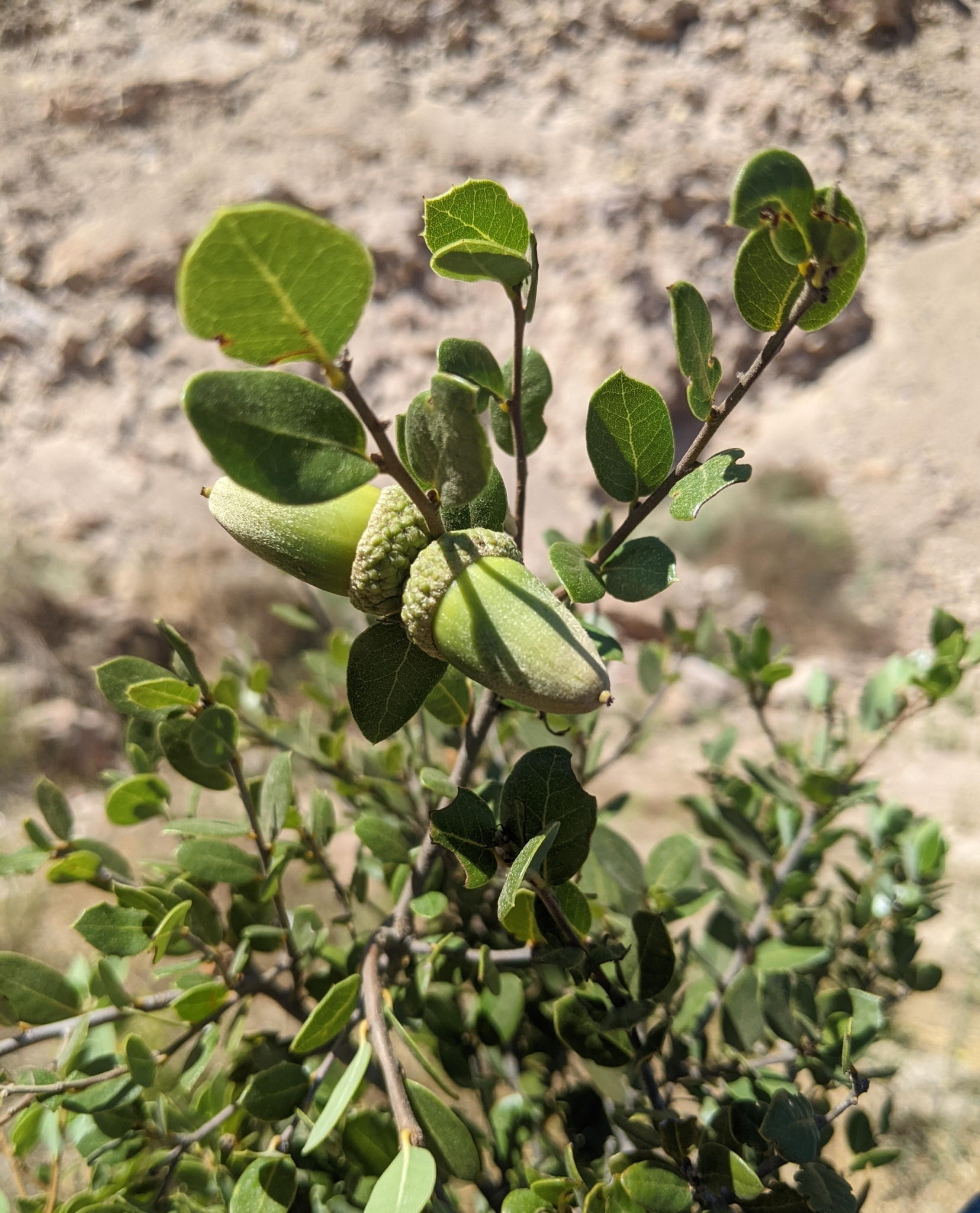

Conservation status
- Vulnerable (IUCN 3.1)

- Imperiled (NatureServe)

Scientific classification
- Kingdom: Plantae
- Clade: Embryophytes
- Clade: Tracheophytes
- Clade: Spermatophytes
- Clade: Angiosperms
- Clade: Eudicots
- Clade: Rosids
- Order: Fagales
- Family: Fagaceae
- Genus: Quercus
- Subgenus: Quercus subg. Quercus
- Section: Quercus sect. Protobalanus
- Species: Q. cedrosensis

Binomial name
- Quercus cedrosensis C.H.Mull.

Synonyms
- Quercus sedrosensis C.H.Mull.

= Quercus cedrosensis =

Species of oak tree

Quercus cedrosensis, the Cedros Island oak, is a species of plant in the family Fagaceae. It is placed in Quercus section Protobalanus.

Quercus cedrosensis is native to Baja California state in northwestern Mexico, including Cedros Island. It has also been found in San Diego County, California.

Quercus cedrosensis is vulnerable to habitat loss due to overgrazing by goats and overlogging.
