= Isla Natividad =

Island in Baja California Sur, Mexico

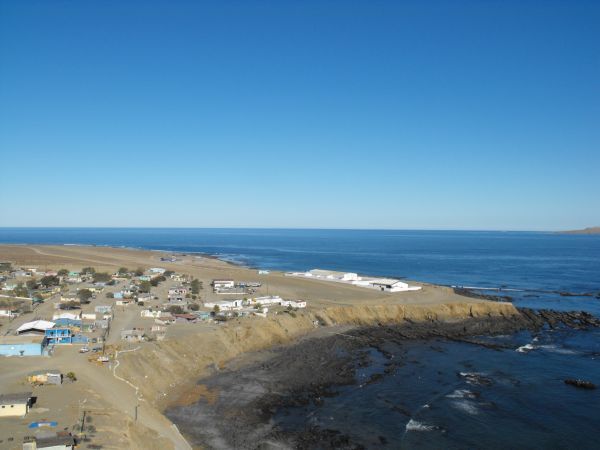

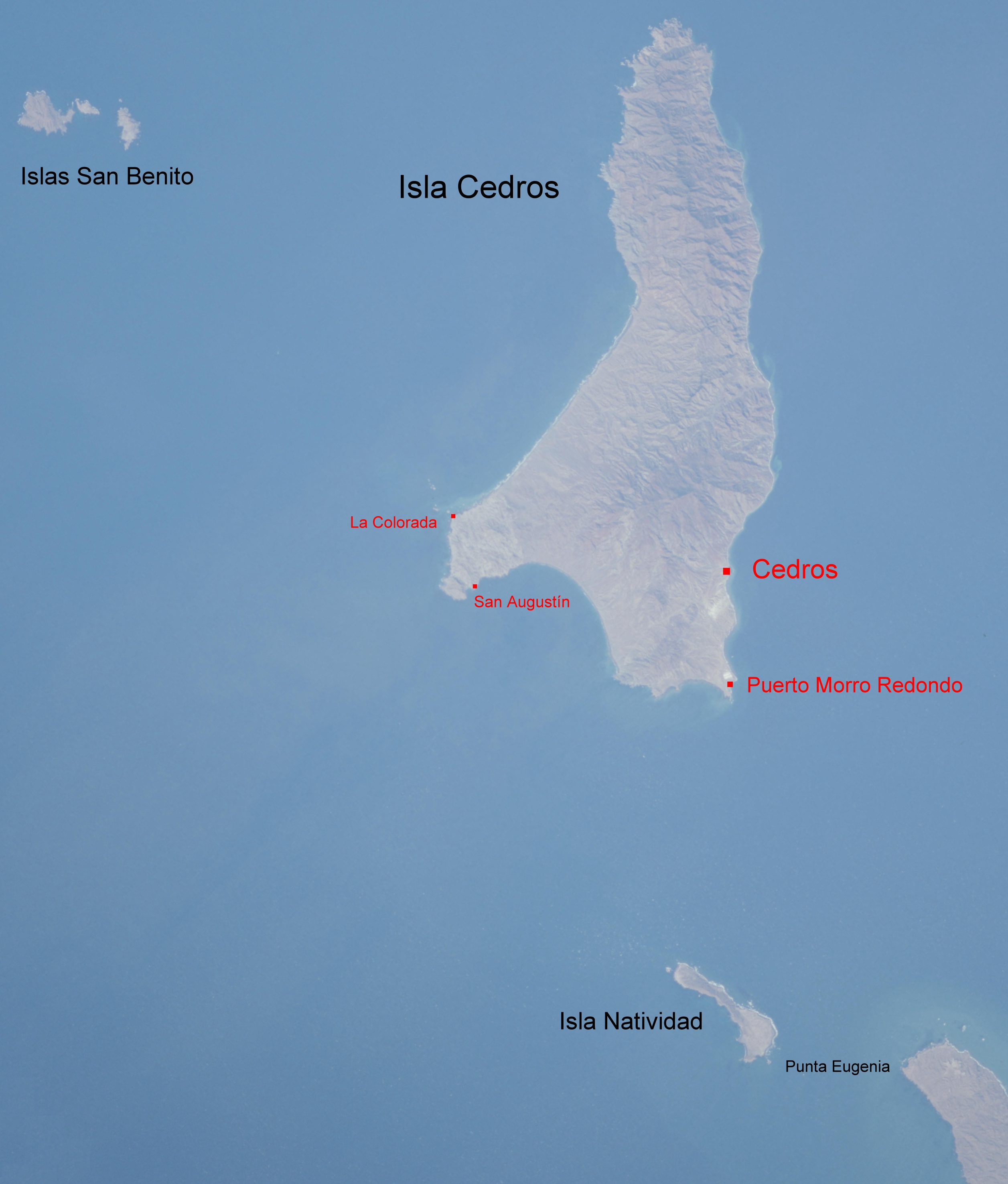
Annotated Space Shuttle photo of Cedros Island, Isla Natividad at the bottom

Isla Natividad is a Mexican island in the Pacific Ocean 6 km west off Punta Eugenia, the northwestern headland of the Mexican state of Baja California Sur. 200 meters off its northwestern end lies Roca María at 27°53′33″N 115°13′19″W, with an area of 0.074 km^{2}. Isla Natividad is separated from the mainland at Punta Eugenia by Canal de Dewey (Dewey's Channel), and from Cedros Island (Baja California), which is 15 km to the north, by Canal de Keller (Canal Kellett).

The island is part of Bahía Tortugas delegación of Mulegé municipality. It is 8.655 km^{2} in area. At the 2001 census, the island had a population of 384, centered in Natividad, a community of abalone, lobster, and clam fishermen, at the southeastern end (27°51′09″N 115°10′09″W). Connection to the mainland is facilitated by an airstrip. There is a lighthouse in the northern part.

== Geography and ecology ==
It has steep rocky shores fringed by rocks and kelp except for a small sandy beach towards the mainland. The island is barren and hilly with a peak 150 m high rising near its center. The flora consists mainly of a dense cover of Mesembryanthemum crystallinum and M. nodiflorum, cacti, and small shrubs. There are no endemic plants or animals on Natividad due to its proximity to the mainland (it was probably part of the mainland several times during the ice ages, when sea levels were lower). However, Mammillaria pondii and a little-researched Opuntioideae cactus, as well as Mentzelia hirsutissima var. nesiotes are found in few other places. Native land vertebrates are few, including the deer mouse Peromyscus maniculatus and some lizards. Seabirds – namely Brandt's cormorant – and seals use the island as a breeding and resting site. Isla Natividad is one of the southernmost breeding locations of Cassin's auklet and a main breeding site for black-vented shearwaters.

== Restoration ==
Between 1997 and 2001, Conservacion de Islas removed introduced goat, Capra hircus, domestic sheep Ovis aries, domestic cats Felis catus, domestic dog Canis familiaris, from the island to primarily benefit the black-vented shearwater Puffinus opisthomelas.
