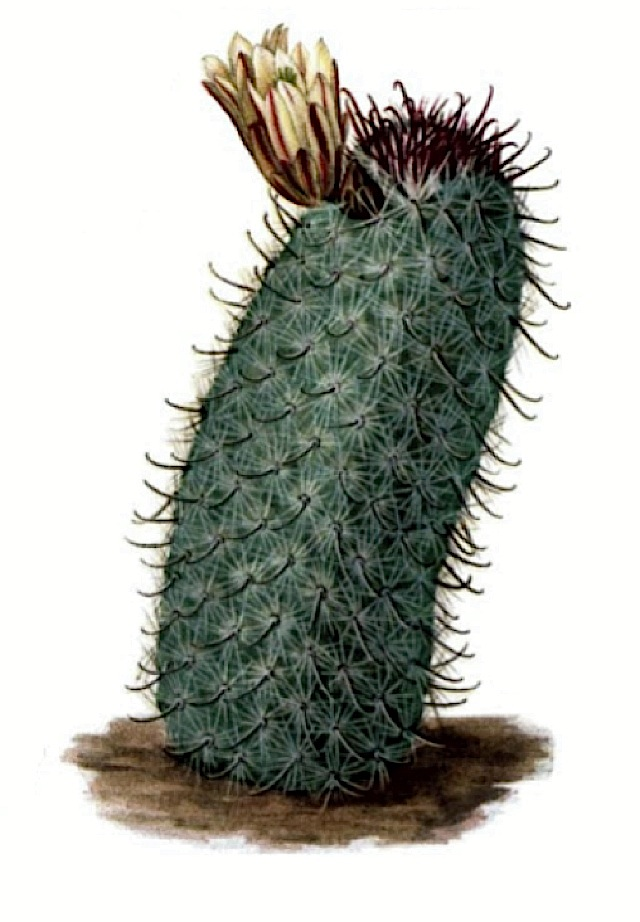

Scientific classification
- Kingdom: Plantae
- Clade: Tracheophytes
- Clade: Angiosperms
- Clade: Eudicots
- Order: Caryophyllales
- Family: Cactaceae
- Subfamily: Cactoideae
- Genus: Cochemiea
- Species: C. goodridgei

Binomial name
- Cochemiea goodridgei (Scheer ex Salm-Dyck) P.B.Breslin & Majure

Synonyms
- Cactus goodridgei (Scheer ex Salm-Dyck) Kuntze 1891; Chilita goodridgei (Scheer ex Salm-Dyck) Orcutt 1926; Ebnerella goodridgei (Scheer ex Salm-Dyck) Buxb. 1951; Mammillaria goodridgei Scheer ex Salm-Dyck 1850; Neomammillaria goodridgei (Scheer ex Salm-Dyck) Britton & Rose 1923

= Cochemiea goodridgei =

Species of cactus

Cochemiea goodridgei is a species of plant in the family Cactaceae. It is endemic to Mexican state Baja California.

== Description ==
Cochemiea goodrichii has deep taproots and rarely sprouts. Its globose to short cylindrical shoots grow up to 8 cm (3.1 in) high and 3 to 4 cm (1.2 to 1.6 in) in diameter. The tapered, conical warts are blunt and lack milky sap, with naked axillae. It has 3 to 5 central spines up to 0.6 cm (0.24 in) long, the lower usually hooked, and 10 to 13 straight radial spines that are chalky white with dark tips, measuring 0.4 to 0.7 cm (0.16 to 0.28 in) long.

The cream-colored, funnel-shaped flowers have central stripes and are up to 1.5 cm (0.59 in) long and in diameter. The red fruits are club-shaped and up to 2.5 cm (0.98 in) long, containing smooth black seeds.

== Distribution ==
Cochemiea goodrichii grows in Baja California, Mexico, on the offshore islands of Cedros and Guadalupe.

== Taxonomy ==
First described in 1850 by Frederick Scheer in Joseph zu Salm-Reifferscheidt-Dyck's Cacteae in horto Dyckensi cultae anno 1849 as Mammillaria goodrichii, the species honors John Goodridge, who discovered it. Scheer's chosen epithet has been often misspelled as goodridgii or goodridgei in many publications.
