= List of radio stations in Baja California Sur =

This is a list of CRT-radio stations in the state of Baja California Sur, which can be sorted by their call signs, frequencies, location, ownership, names, and programming formats.

Radio stations in Baja California Sur
Call sign	Frequency	Location	Owner	Name	Format
XESJC-AM (Note: Linked to XHESJC-FM, which must keep XESJC-AM on the air until there are no listeners in its service area unserved by other radio stations.)	660 AM	San José del Cabo	Raúl Antonio Aréchiga Espinoza	Kvoz	Regional Mexican
XELBC-AM (Note: Linked to XHLBC-FM, which must keep XELBC-AM on the air until there are no listeners in its service area unserved by other radio stations. However, once built, XECSBU-AM will take over this frequency and the continuity obligation.)	730 AM	Loreto	Roberto Loreto Cota Araiza	Radio La Giganta	Full-service
XENT-AM (Note: Linked to XHNT-FM, which must keep XENT-AM on the air until there are no listeners in its service area unserved by other radio stations.)	790 AM	La Paz	Transmisora Regional Radio Fórmula, S.A. de C.V.	Radio Fórmula	News/talk
XERLA-AM (Note: Linked to XHRLA-FM, which must keep XERLA-AM on the air until there are no listeners in its service area unserved by other radio stations.)	940 AM	Santa Rosalía	Antonio Rigoberto Espinoza Pedrín	Radio Santa Rosalía	Full-service
XEBAC-AM (Note: Linked to XHBAC-FM, which must keep XEBAC-AM on the air until there are no listeners in its service area unserved by other radio stations.)	1100 AM	Bahía Asunción	Bertha Josefa Cesaria Cota Aguilar		
XEUBS-AM	1180 AM	La Paz	Universidad Autónoma de Baja California Sur	Radio UABCS	University
XEPAS-AM (Note: Linked to XHEPAS-FM, which must keep XEPAS-AM on the air until there are no listeners in its service area unserved by other radio stations.)	1200 AM	Punta Abreojos	Alicia Carlon Toledo		
XHCPBV-FM	88.9 FM	El Centenario–La Paz	Instituto Mexicano de la Radio	Altavoz Radio	Public radio
XHPSJC-FM	89.1 FM	San José del Cabo	Compañía Periodística Sudcaliforniana, S.A. de C.V.	Radiante FM	Contemporary hit radio
XHCCAD-FM	89.9 FM	San José del Cabo	Jesús Ricardo Balderrama Bórquez	La Mejor	Regional Mexican
XHGNS-FM	90.1 FM	Guerrero Negro	María Teresa Aréchiga Espinoza		
XHW-FM	90.1 FM	La Paz	Radio La Paz, S.A.	Alegría Mexicana	Regional Mexican
XHPLPZ-FM	91.1 FM	La Paz	Compañía Periodística Sudcaliforniana, S.A. de C.V.	Radiante FM	Contemporary hit radio
XHMPJ-FM	91.5 FM	San José del Cabo	Luis Roberto Márquez Pizano	Super Stereo Miled	News/talk
XHPAS-FM	91.7 FM	Punta Abreojos	Alicia Carlon Toledo		
XHESR-FM	91.7 FM	Santa Rosalía	María Guadalupe Espinoza Pedrín		
XHANS-FM	92.5 FM	Bahía Asunción	Humberto Espinoza Pedrín		
XHELPZ-FM	92.7 FM	El Centenario–La Paz	Mensajes Musicales, S.A.		
XHBTA-FM	92.9 FM	Bahía Tortugas	Rodolfo Romeo Hernández y Espinoza		
XHESJC-FM	93.1 FM	San José del Cabo	Raúl Antonio Aréchiga Espinoza	Kvoz	Regional Mexican
XHOLP-FM	93.3 FM	Santa Rosalía	Ondas en la Playa, A.C.	Radiokashana	Community radio
XHCCAA-FM	93.9 FM	Todos Santos	Cabo Mil, S.A. de C.V.	—N/a	—N/a
XHGNB-FM	94.1 FM	Guerrero Negro	Jesús Mayoral López		
XHPAS-FM	94.9 FM	Punta Abreojos	David Meza Carlón		
XHBCPZ-FM	95.1 FM	La Paz	Luis Roberto Márquez Pizano	Super Stereo Miled	News/talk
XHBAC-FM	95.7 FM	Bahía Asunción	Bertha Josefa Cesaria Cota Aguilar		
XHLBC-FM	95.7 FM	Loreto	Roberto Loreto Cota Araiza		
XHRLA-FM	95.7 FM	Santa Rosalía	Antonio Rigoberto Espinoza Pedrín		
XHPAL-FM	95.9 FM	La Paz	Antonio Rigoberto Espinoza Pedrín	Digimix	Contemporary hit radio
XHSJS-FM	96.3 FM	San José del Cabo	Cabo Mil, S.A. de C.V.	Cabo Mil	Full-service
XHBTS-FM	96.5 FM	Bahía Tortugas	Candelario Serna Gurrola		
XHPAZ-FM	96.7 FM	La Paz	Raúl Aréchiga Espinoza	Super Stereo	Adult contemporary
XHVSD-FM	97.5 FM	Ciudad Constitución	María Guadalupe Espinoza Pedrín	La Señal del Progreso	
XHNT-FM	97.5 FM	La Paz	Transmisora Regional Radio Fórmula, S.A. de C.V.	Radio Fórmula	News/talk
XHPAB-FM	98.3 FM	El Centenario–La Paz	Radio Celebridad, S.A.		
XHHIA-FM	99.1 FM	Bahía Tortugas	Government of the State of Baja California Sur	La Radio de Sudcalifornia	Public radio
XHLUC-FM	99.1 FM	Cabo San Lucas	Government of the State of Baja California Sur	La Radio de Sudcalifornia	Public radio
XHCON-FM	99.1 FM	Ciudad Constitución	Government of the State of Baja California Sur	La Radio de Sudcalifornia	Public radio
XHNEG-FM	99.1 FM	Guerrero Negro	Government of the State of Baja California Sur	La Radio de Sudcalifornia	Public radio
XHBCP-FM	99.1 FM	La Paz	Government of the State of Baja California Sur	La Radio de Sudcalifornia	Public radio
XHLOR-FM	99.1 FM	Loreto	Government of the State of Baja California Sur	La Radio de Sudcalifornia	Public radio
XHSRB-FM	99.1 FM	Santa Rosalía	Government of the State of Baja California Sur	La Radio de Sudcalifornia	Public radio
XHEBCS-FM	99.9 FM	La Paz	Universidad Autónoma de Baja California Sur	Radio UABCS	Public radio
XHZPL-FM	100.7 FM	La Paz	María Regina de la Peza Berrios	Estéreo Romance	Romantic
XHABO-FM	101.5 FM	Cabo San Lucas	Radio Agricultores del Valle de Sinaloa, A.C.	NRGY 101.5 FM	Contemporary hit radio
XHCSAP-FM	101.5 FM	La Paz	Voz de Transformación, A.C.	Más Radio	News/talk
XHCCAB-FM	102.3 FM	Cabo San Lucas	Jesús Ricardo Balderrama Bórquez	La Mejor	Regional Mexican
XHCCAC-FM	103.9 FM	San José del Cabo–Cabo San Lucas	Stereorey México, S.A.	Exa FM	Contemporary hit radio
XHCSCU-FM	104.7 FM	La Paz	Grupo Uniradio	Los Número Uno	Regional Mexican
XHHZ-FM	105.5 FM	La Paz	Raúl Aréchiga Espinoza	La HZ	
XHSCAN-FM	107.9 FM	Cabo San Lucas	Corazón de las Californias, A.C.	Radio Chureya	Community radio
