= 95.7 FM =

FM radio frequency

The following radio stations broadcast on FM frequency 95.7 MHz:

== Argentina ==
- Cable a Tierra in Salta
- LRM702 RT 21 in Sunchales, Santa Fe
- LRM729 Del Centro in Gálvez, Santa Fe
- Net in San Nicolás de los Arroyos, Buenos Aires
- Radio Cristiana in Rosario, Santa Fe.
- Radio María in Berrotarán, Córdoba
- Universal Coronel Dorrego in Coronel Dorrego, Buenos Aires
- Universidad in Mar del Plata, Buenos Aires.
- Universo in San Francisco, Córdoba

== Australia ==
- ABC Classic in Wollongong, New South Wales
- Triple J in Yulara, Northern Territory
- 4PNN in Gold Coast, Queensland
- Hot FM (Australian radio network) in Bunbury, Western Australia
- 3GDR Golden Days Radio in Melbourne, Victoria

== Canada (Channel 239) ==
- CBK-FM-4 in Swift Current, Saskatchewan
- CBQS-FM in Sioux Narrows, Ontario
- CBWX-FM in Fisher Branch, Manitoba
- CFJB-FM in Barrie, Ontario
- CFPW-FM in Powell River, British Columbia
- CHBI-FM in Burnt Islands, Newfoundland and Labrador
- CHGO-FM-1 in Rouyn-Noranda, Quebec
- CIWF-FM in Big River Reserve, Saskatchewan
- CJAT-FM in Trail, British Columbia
- CJNE-FM-1 in Tisdale, Saskatchewan
- CJOK-1-FM in Tar Island, Alberta
- CKAV-FM-9 in Ottawa, Ontario
- CKEA-FM in Edmonton, Alberta
- CKIJ-FM in St. John's, Newfoundland and Labrador
- CKLS-FM in Lytton, Quebec
- CKRP-FM in Falher, Alberta
- CKTP-FM in Fredericton, New Brunswick
- CKYK-FM in Alma, Quebec
- CKYQ-FM in Plessisville, Quebec
- VF2333 in Gillam, Manitoba

== China ==
- CNR The Voice of China in Ningbo

== Ireland ==
- Midlands 103 in Tullamore
- Shannonside FM in Boyle, County Roscommon

== Malaysia ==
- 8FM in Kota Kinabalu, Sabah
- Miri FM in Miri, Sarawak
- Mutiara FM in Penang and Northern Perak

== Mexico ==
- XHAGA-FM in Aguascalientes, Aguascalientes
- XHATF-FM in Atlacomulco, State of Mexico
- XHBAC-FM in Bahía Asunción, Baja California Sur
- XHBK-FM in Nuevo Laredo, Tamaulipas
- XHBOCH-FM in Bochil, Chiapas
- XHBV-FM in Moroleón, Guanajuato
- XHCE-FM in Oaxaca, Oaxaca
- XHCK-FM in Durango, Durango
- XHCT-FM in Cuernavaca, Morelos
- XHCTS-FM in Comitán de Dominguez, Chiapas
- XHLBC-FM in Loreto, Baja California Sur
- XHLCM-FM in Lázaro Cárdenas, Michoacán
- XHMFS-FM in Mochicahui, El Fuerte Municipality, Sinaloa
- XHMY-FM in Mineral del Monte, Hidalgo
- XHOTE-FM in Mecayapan, Veracruz
- XHPEBX-FM in Cintalapa de Figueroa, Chiapas
- XHQD-FM in Chihuahua, Chihuahua
- XHRK-FM in Monterrey, Nuevo León
- XHCCBY-FM in San Luis Potosí, San Luis Potosí
- XHRLA-FM in Santa Rosalía, Baja California Sur
- XHSDM-FM in Santo Domingo, Chiapas
- XHTAB-FM in Villahermosa, Tabasco
- XHUPC-FM in Mexico City
- XHXO-FM in Ciudad Mante, Tamaulipas

== Philippines ==
- DYDJ in Roxas City, Capiz
- DYBZ in San Jose, Antique
- DYGM in San Carlos City
- DXBL in Cagayan De Oro City
- DXCE in Koronadal City

== Saint Vincent and the Grenadines ==
- Praise FM (Saint Vincent and the Grenadines)

== United Kingdom ==
- BBC Radio Devon in Plymouth
- Penistone FM in Penistone, South Yorkshire

== United States (Channel 239) ==
- KALF in Red Bluff, California
- KBFA-LP in West Monroe, Louisiana
- KBGO in Waco, Texas
- KBOY in Medford, Oregon
- KBST in Big Spring, Texas
- KCGM in Scobey, Montana
- KCHZ in Ottawa, Kansas
- KCJP-LP in El Centro, California
- KCOV-LP in Gillette, Wyoming
- KDAL in Duluth, Minnesota
- KDHT in Denver, Colorado
- KDRT-LP in Davis, California
- KELO-FM in Dell Rapids, South Dakota
- KETI-LP in Choteau, Montana
- KEZJ in Twin Falls, Idaho
- KGMZ-FM in San Francisco, California
- KJEB in Seattle, Washington
- KJFX in Fresno, California
- KKAJ-FM in Davis, Oklahoma
- KKHH in Houston, Texas
- KKOK in Morris, Minnesota
- KKSR in Walla Walla, Washington
- KLEA in Hobbs, New Mexico
- KLEY in Jourdanton, Texas
- KLKL in Minden, Louisiana
- KLME in Langdon, North Dakota
- KLYN-LP in Las Vegas, New Mexico
- KMFH-LP in Oskaloosa, Iowa
- KMKO-FM in Lake Crystal-Mankato, Minnesota
- KNNA-LP in Lincoln, Nebraska
- KOSY-FM in Anamosa, Iowa
- KOWN-LP in Omaha, Nebraska
- KPAT in Orcutt, California
- KPCL in Farmington, New Mexico
- KPKR in Parker, Arizona
- KPUR-FM in Claude, Texas
- KQLZ in New England, North Dakota
- KQWC-FM in Webster City, Iowa
- KRCO-FM in Prineville, Oregon
- KROA in Grand Island, Nebraska
- KROK (FM) in South Fort Polk, Louisiana
- KRRH-LP in Edinburg, Texas
- KSEC in Bentonville, Arkansas
- KSSN in Little Rock, Arkansas
- KSSX in Carlsbad, California
- KSWI in Atlantic, Iowa
- KURC-LP in Bastrop, Louisiana
- KUTC in Gunnison, Utah
- KVPM in Arvin, California
- KWKM in Saint Johns, Arizona
- KWSK-LP in Cason, Texas
- KWWR in Mexico, Missouri
- KXLS in Lahoma, Oklahoma
- KYBE in Frederick, Oklahoma
- KYNC-LP in Sachse, Texas
- KZLH-LP in Zapata, Texas
- KZSX-LP in Cherry Valley, California
- WAFM (United States) in Amory, Mississippi
- WAQX in Manlius, New York
- WAYB in Graysville, Tennessee
- WBEN in Philadelphia, Pennsylvania
- WBHD in Olyphant, Pennsylvania
- WBHJ in Midfield, Alabama
- WCCK in Calvert City, Kentucky
- WCLM-LP in Woodstock, Virginia
- WCMB in Oscoda, Michigan
- WCRC (FM) in Effingham, Illinois
- WDAE-FM in Clearwater, Florida
- WDKW in Maryville, Tennessee
- WDOT in Danville, Vermont
- WELT-LP in Fort Wayne, Indiana
- WFID in Rio Piedras, Puerto Rico
- WFKX in Henderson, Tennessee
- WFLO in Farmville, Virginia
- WHAL-FM in Horn Lake, Mississippi
- WHIO in Pleasant Hill, Ohio
- WHNJ in Big Pine Key, Florida
- WHOG in Ormond-By-The-Sea, Florida
- WHWL in Marquette, Michigan
- WIMX in Gibsonburg, Ohio
- WIOL-FM in Greenville, Georgia
- WJDK-FM in Seneca, Illinois
- WKBU in New Orleans, Louisiana
- WKML in Lumberton, North Carolina
- WKSS in Hartford-Meriden, Connecticut
- WKXN in Fort Deposit, Alabama
- WLDM-LP in Sanitaria Springs, New York
- WLHF-LP in Champaign, Illinois
- WLHT in Grand Rapids, Michigan
- WLPM-LP in Christmas, Florida
- WLXL-LP in Lexington, Kentucky
- WMRF in Lewistown, Pennsylvania
- WMTZ-LP in Rutland, Vermont
- WNCG-LP in Mansfield, Ohio
- WPCA-LP in Amery, Wisconsin
- WPIG in Olean, New York
- WPLV in Navarre, Florida
- WPMR-LP in Russellville, Alabama
- WQAR-LP in Addison, Michigan
- WQMF in Jeffersonville, Indiana
- WQPW in Valdosta, Georgia
- WRDI in Nappanee, Indiana
- WRIT in Milwaukee, Wisconsin
- WRMA in North Miami Beach, Florida
- WROE-LP in Roanoke, Virginia
- WROF-LP in Floyd, Virginia
- WRQT in La Crosse, Wisconsin
- WRXA-LP in Rocky Mount, Virginia
- WSCM in Baldwin, Wisconsin
- WSEY in Oregon, Illinois
- WSGD-LP in Lehigh Acres, Florida
- WSWW in Craigsville, West Virginia
- WTGY in Charleston, Mississippi
- WUKV in Trion, Georgia
- WVKF in Shadyside, Ohio
- WVKL in Norfolk, Virginia
- WNKQ-LP in Kissimmee Florida
- WVQC-LP in Cincinnati, Ohio
- WWMJ in Ellsworth, Maine
- WXRC in Hickory, North Carolina
- WYCM in Attica, Indiana
- WZID in Manchester, New Hampshire
- WZLP-LP in Loudonville, Ohio
