= 94.9 FM =

FM radio frequency

The following radio stations broadcast on FM frequency 94.9 MHz:

== Argentina ==
- 949MHZ in Mar del Plata, Buenos Aires
- Brava in Puerto Madryn, Chubut
- Britos in Quimili, Santiago del Estero
- Full in Eduardo Castex, La Pampa
- HIT95 in Rosario, Santa Fe
- Ideal en Santa Fe de la Vera Cruz, Santa Fe
- La Plaza in Salta
- La Sabrosita in Buenos Aires
- Mercedes in Villa Mercedes, San Luis
- Monumental in Ushuaia, Tierra del Fuego
- Patagonia in General Roca, Río Negro
- Play in Alcorta, Santa Fe
- Primavera in Pujato, Santa Fe
- Radio María in Carmen de Patagones, Buenos Aires
- Radio María in Andalgalá, Catamarca
- Radio María in Formosa
- Radio María in San Cristóbal, Santa Fe
- Radio María in Villa Gobernador Gálvez, Santa Fe
- Rock and Pop Corrientes in Corrientes
- Somos Radio in San Francisco, Córdoba
- Zensitive in Tigre, Buenos Aires

== Australia ==
- Cross FM in Broken Hill, New South Wales
- Rhema FM in Gosford, New South Wales
- Triple J in Alice Springs, Northern Territory
- 4MIX in Brisbane, Queensland
- 3JOY in Melbourne, Victoria
- Triple J in Hamilton, Victoria
- ABC Classic in Geraldton, Western Australia

== Bermuda ==
- ZFB-FM at Hamilton

== Canada (Channel 235) ==
- CBKV-FM in Cumberland House, Saskatchewan
- CBON-FM-7 in Espanola, Ontario
- CBTA-FM in Trail, British Columbia
- CBUF-FM-8 in Port Alberni, British Columbia
- CFFM-FM-2 in Quesnel, British Columbia
- CFGD-FM in Brisay, Quebec
- CFUG-FM in Tatalrose, British Columbia
- CHGL-FM in Green Lake, Saskatchewan
- CHME-FM in Les Escoumins, Quebec
- CHRW-FM in London, Ontario
- CIEU-FM in Carleton, Quebec
- CIMF-FM in Gatineau, Quebec
- CJPR-FM in Blairmore, Alberta
- CKGE-FM in Oshawa, Ontario
- CKPE-FM in Sydney, Nova Scotia
- CKUA-FM in Edmonton, Alberta
- CKWM-FM in Kentville, Nova Scotia
- CKYL-FM in Peace River, Alberta
- VF2345 in Logan Lake, British Columbia
- VF2481 in Coal Valley Mine, Alberta

== Colombia ==
- La FM in Bogotá, Colombia

== China ==
- CNR Business Radio in Fuzhou
- CNR Cross-Strait Radio in Xiamen, Zhangzhou and south of Quanzhou
- Zhaoqing Golden Radio

== Iran ==
- Radio Alborz in Karaj

== Ireland ==
- 4fm in Dublin

== Japan ==
- KBS Kyoto Radio in Kyoto

== Malaysia ==
- Radio Klasik in Kedah, Perlis and Penang

== Mexico ==
- XHCHH-FM in Chihuahua, Chihuahua
- XHEOA-FM in Oaxaca, Oaxaca
- XHEPAS-FM in Mulegé, Baja California Sur
- XHEXL-FM in Pátzcuaro, Michoacán
- XHFM-FM in Veracruz, Veracruz
- XHMAE-FM in Ciudad Mante, Tamaulipas
- XHORO-FM in Puebla, Puebla
- XHEMIT-FM in Comitán de Domínguez, Chiapas
- XHPBCQ-FM in Cancún, Quintana Roo
- XHPTEA-FM in Soteapan, Veracruz
- XHQZ-FM in San Juan de los Lagos, Jalisco
- XHSB-FM in Santa Bárbara, Chihuahua
- XHSW-FM in Cuernavaca, Morelos
- XHTEC-FM in Monterrey, Nuevo León
- XHTVH-FM in Villahermosa, Tabasco
- XHTW-FM in Tampico, Tamaulipas
- XHUDC-FM in Colima, Colima
- XHZG-FM in Ixmiquilpan, Hidalgo

== Philippines ==
- FM Radio Cagayan 94.9

== Taiwan ==
- Transfer CNR Cross-Strait Radio in Kinmen

== United Kingdom ==
- BBC Radio 4 in Derry
- BBC Radio Bristol in Bristol and South Gloucestershire
- BBC Radio London in London
- BBC Radio Lincolnshire in Lincolnshire

== United States (Channel 235) ==
- KAGO-FM in Altamont, Oregon
- KBGE in Cannon Beach, Oregon
- KBIM-FM in Roswell, New Mexico
- KBOS in Tulare, California
- KBZT in San Diego, California
- KCIN in Cedar City, Utah
- KCMO in Kansas City, Missouri
- KCPI in Albert Lea, Minnesota
- KCUS-LP in Pittsburg, Texas
- KDJA in Terrebonne, Oregon
- KECS-LP in Lafayette, Louisiana
- KENZ in Provo, Utah
- KEON in Ganado, Texas
- KESU-LP in Lihue, Hawaii
- KGGO in Des Moines, Iowa
- KHKN in Maumelle, Arkansas
- KHMZ in Snyder, Texas
- KHRQ in Baker, California
- KIND-FM in Elk City, Kansas
- KIOK in Richland, Washington
- KIWW-LP in Liberal, Kansas
- KJHJ-LP in Conroe, Texas
- KJLT in North Platte, Nebraska
- KLCH in Lake City, Minnesota
- KLRJ in Aberdeen, South Dakota
- KLTY in Arlington, Texas
- KMXK in Cold Spring, Minnesota
- KMXZ in Tucson, Arizona
- KNCK-FM in Concordia, Kansas
- KOCZ-LP in Opelousas, Louisiana
- KOLI in Electra, Texas
- KPFG-LP in Pasadena, Texas
- KPKY in Pocatello, Idaho
- KPLL-LP in Lewiston, Idaho
- KPWI in Craig, Alaska
- KPYG in Cayucos, California
- KQDS in Duluth, Minnesota
- KQUR in Laredo, Texas
- KRAD-LP in Millersburg, Oregon
- KRBS-LP in Brownsville, Texas
- KRMW in Cedarville, Arkansas
- KRUT-LP in Houston, Texas
- KRVB in Nampa, Idaho
- KSBH in Coushatta, Louisiana
- KSDC-LP in Centralia, Missouri
- KTEE in North Bend, Oregon
- KTZU in Velva, North Dakota
- KUOW in Seattle, Washington
- KVWJ-LP in Hyrum, Utah
- KWWU-LP in Fulton, Missouri
- KWYK in Aztec, New Mexico
- KXTT in Maricopa, California
- KYLD in San Francisco, California
- KYSS in Missoula, Montana
- KZAX-LP in Bellingham, Washington
- KZWY in Sheridan, Wyoming
- WAAG in Galesburg, Illinois
- WAEM-LP in Acton, Massachusetts
- WAEZ in Greeneville, Tennessee
- WDKB in Dekalb, Illinois
- WGCQ in Ripley, Tennessee
- WGIC-LP in Clarksville, Tennessee
- WGNH in South Webster, Ohio
- WGUO in Reserve, Louisiana
- WHKS in Port Allegany, Pennsylvania
- WHNL-LP in Hinesville, Georgia
- WHOM in Mount Washington, New Hampshire
- WJJF in Montauk, New York
- WKHI in Newark, Maryland
- WKJZ in Hillman, Michigan
- WKLL in Frankfort, New York
- WKOR in Columbus, Mississippi
- WKSJ in Mobile, Alabama
- WKVF in Bartlett, Tennessee
- WKZC in Scottville, Michigan
- WMMQ in East Lansing, Michigan
- WMSR in Collinwood, Tennessee
- WOGG in Oliver, Pennsylvania
- WOHA in Ada, Ohio
- WOKE-LP in Fort Myers, Florida
- WOLX in Baraboo, Wisconsin
- WPMX in Millen, Georgia
- WPTE in Virginia Beach, Virginia
- WQMX in Medina, Ohio
- WRBT in Harrisburg, Pennsylvania
- WREW in Fairfield, Ohio
- WRHK in Danville, Illinois
- WRLE-LP in Dunnellon, Florida
- WRSD in Folsom, Pennsylvania
- WSJM in Benton Harbor, Michigan
- WSLC in Roanoke, Virginia
- WSYY in Millinocket, Maine
- WTNE-LP in Cleveland, Tennessee
- WTNT in Tallahassee, Florida
- WUBL in Atlanta, Georgia
- WUDS-LP in Woodstock, Virginia
- WUPZ in Chocolay Township, Michigan
- WVCO in Loris, South Carolina
- WWRM in Tampa, Florida
- WXRJ-LP in Bloomington, Illinois
- WYNG in Mount Carmel, Illinois
- WZMR-LP in East Boston, Massachusetts
- WZMW-LP in East Boston, Massachusetts
- WZTU in Miami Beach, Florida
