= WGUE =

WGUE may refer to:

- WGUE (AM), a radio station (1180 AM) licensed to serve Turrell, Arkansas, United States
- WUMY (AM), a radio station (830 AM) licensed to serve Memphis, Tennessee, United States, which held the call sign WGUE from 2014 to 2017
