= WUMY =

WUMY may refer to:

- WUMY (AM), a radio station (830 AM) licensed to serve Memphis, Tennessee, United States
- WGUE (AM), a radio station (1180 AM) licensed to serve Turrell, Arkansas, United States, which held the call sign WUMY from 2014 to 2017
