= 730 AM =

Mexican and Canadian clear-channel frequency

730 AM is a Mexican and Canadian clear-channel frequency. XEX Mexico City and CKAC Montreal are the Class A stations on 730 kHz. The following radio stations broadcast on AM frequency 730 kHz:

== Argentina ==
- Radio Concepto in Buenos Aires.
- LRA3 in Santa Rosa, La Pampa.
- BBN in Buenos Aires.
- LRA27 Nacional in San Fernando del Valle de Catamarca, Catamarca
- LU23 Lago Argentino in El Calafate, Santa Cruz.

== Canada ==
Stations in bold are clear-channel stations.

Call sign	City of license	Daytime power (kW)	Nighttime power (kW)	Transmitter coordinates
**CKAC**	Montreal, Quebec	50	50	45.5139°N 73.9733°W
CKDM	Dauphin, Manitoba	10	5	51.152222°N 100.23°W
CKNW	Vancouver, British Columbia	50	50	49.1335°N 123.004587°W

== Colombia ==
- HJCU at Bogota

== Guatemala (Channel 20) ==
- TGN in Guatemala City

== Mexico ==
Stations in bold are clear-channel stations.

- XELBC-AM in Loreto, Baja California Sur
- XEPET-AM in Peto, Yucatán
- XESOS-AM in El Sifón, Sonora
- **XEX-AM** in Mexico City - 60 kW daytime, 100 kW nighttime transmitter located at 19.36505°N 98.957703°W

== United States ==
Call sign	City of license	Facility	Class	Daytime power (kW)	Nighttime power (kW)	Transmitter coordinates	
KKDA	Grand Prairie, Texas	59703	B	0.5	0.5	32.764167°N 96.990556°W	
KQPN	West Memphis, Arkansas	48749	B	1	1	35.246111°N 90.146944°W	
KSVN	Ogden, Utah	57444	D	1	0.066	41.188056°N 112.081111°W	
KTBA	Tuba City, Arizona	71794	D	1	0.016		36.131667°N 111.249722°W
KULE	Ephrata, Washington	4041	D	1	0.029	47.316944°N 119.562778°W	
KWOA	Worthington, Minnesota	48971	D	1	0.159	43.63°N 95.678056°W	
KWRE	Warrenton, Missouri	33467	D	1	0.12	38.822222°N 91.1375°W	
KYYA	Billings, Montana	19216	D	5	0.236	45.758056°N 108.498056°W	
WACE	Chicopee, Massachusetts	9194	D	5	0.007	42.167222°N 72.625278°W	
WAZL	Nanticoke, Pennsylvania	59757	D	1	0.012	41.219444°N 75.991111°W	
WFMC	Goldsboro, North Carolina	70622	D	1	0.094	35.373611°N 78.011389°W	
WFMW	Madisonville, Kentucky	60880	D	0.5	0.215	37.358611°N 87.495833°W	
WJMT	Merrill, Wisconsin	57222	D	1	0.127	45.179167°N 89.638889°W	
WJTO	Bath, Maine	33287	D	1	0.006	43.8775°N 69.846944°W	
WJYM	Bowling Green, Ohio	31170	D	1	0.359	41.5325°N 83.565278°W	
WLIL	Lenoir City, Tennessee	73211	D	1	0.214	35.77°N 84.279722°W	
WLTQ	Charleston, South Carolina	73874	D	1.1	0.103	32.773333°N 80.015556°W	
WMNA	Gretna, Virginia	65518	D	1	0.028	36.925278°N 79.330556°W	
WPIT	Pittsburgh, Pennsylvania	58624	D	5	0.024	40.482778°N 79.991944°W	
WSTT	Thomasville, Georgia	39735	D	5	0.027	30.713056°N 84.138889°W	
WTNT	Alexandria, Virginia	70036	D	8	0.025	38.745278°N 77.099444°W	
WUMP	Madison, Alabama	39590	D	1	0.129	34.696111°N 86.738611°W	
WVFN	East Lansing, Michigan	24638	D	0.5	0.05	42.645833°N 84.560833°W (daytime); 42.645833°N 84.560556°W (nighttime)	
WWTK	Lake Placid, Florida	27194	B	0.5	0.34	27.406944°N 81.432222°W	
WZGV	Cramerton, North Carolina	26179	D	10	0.165	35.266667°N 80.901389°W	
