= XHOLP-FM =

Community radio station in Santa Rosalía, Baja California Sur

- Santa Rosalía, Baja California Sur; Mexico
- Frequency: 93.3 FM
- Branding: Radio Kashana

Programming
- Format: Community radio

Ownership
- Owner: Ondas en la Playa, A.C.

History
- First air date: February 21, 2018 (with concession)
- Call sign meaning: Ondas en La Playa

Technical information
- Licensing authority: CRT
- Class: A
- ERP: 454 watts
- HAAT: 62.5 m (205 ft)
- Transmitter coordinates: 27°19′45.14″N 112°16′13.22″W

Links
- Website: radiokashana.org

XHOLP-FM is a community radio station on 93.3 FM in Santa Rosalía, Baja California Sur. It is known as Radio Kashana and owned by Ondas de la Playa, A.C.

== History ==
The first radio station in Santa Rosalía was XESR-AM 1320 "Radio Cachanía". This station ceased to provide local programming in the early 2000s. Local interests sought to bring a new radio station to the town. In 2011, Ondas de la Playa, A.C., was founded by Rafael Murúa, who had worked at what became XHCD-FM in Hermosillo, and the next month, Radio Kashana was set up as an Internet radio station.

The next step for Radio Kashana was to obtain an FM frequency. The station operated as a pirate between 2012 and 2014 on 90.3 MHz. In September 2014, Hurricane Norbert caused water damage to the truck that had housed the station's facilities, putting it off the air. By this time, reforms had created social community radio stations as a distinct class. The hurricane also further highlighted the need for a station based in Santa Rosalía, as the two other radio services in town, XHESR and the local transmitter for La Radio de Sudcalifornia, lost their connections to La Paz and were silent.

In August 2015, Ondas de la Playa applied for a community radio concession in Santa Rosalía — the first social radio station anywhere in Baja California Sur. The concession was delivered on December 14, 2016, and in January 2018, installation work finally began for XHOLP-FM 93.3. Full local programming began on February 21, 2018.

Station founder Rafael Murúa was found dead along a highway outside of Santa Rosalía on January 21, 2019. He had previously stated that he had been threatened in 2018.
