= KRAD =

KRAD or krad may refer to:

- Keith R. A. DeCandido (born 1969), American sci-fi and fantasy writer
- KGFK (AM), a radio station (1590 AM) licensed to East Grand Forks, Minnesota, United States, licensed as KRAD until February 1981
- KRAD-LP, a low-power radio station (94.9 FM) licensed to Millersburg, Oregon, United States
- Krad, a character from the manga series D.N.Angel
- Krad, a nickname for the Kettenkrad, a German World War II half-track vehicle with motorcycle-like front structure
- krad, an abbreviation for kilorad, a unit of radiation
- krad, an abbreviation for kiloradian, a unit of angle
