= Bahía Tortugas, Baja California Sur =

Bahía Tortugas
- Town
- Location of Bahía Tortugas in Baja California Sur Location of Bahía Tortugas in Mexico
- Coordinates: 27°42′N 114°54′W
- Country: Mexico
- State: Baja California Sur
- Municipality: Mulegé
- Elevation: 14 m (46 ft)

Population (2020)
  - Total: 2,367
- Time zone: UTC−07:00 (MST)

Bahía Tortugas is a town in Baja California Sur, Mexico. It is in Mulegé Municipality on the west coast of the peninsula, and is one of the six subdivisions of the municipality. The town is nearby Punta Eugenia, and it is northwest of Bahía Asunción.

Bahía Tortugas is connected to Ensenada and Isla de Cedros via its public Bahía Tortugas Airfield; operated by the airline Aeroservicios California Pacífico.

In 2010, the town had a population of 2,671. By 2020, this had declined to 2,374 inhabitants.

== Media ==
- XHBTA-FM
- XHBTS-FM
- XHHIA-FM

== Climate ==
Bahía Tortugas possesses an ocean-moderated warm desert climate (Köppen: BWh); experiencing quite hot summers and very mild winters. Daily mean temperatures fluctuate from 24.6 °C (76.3 °F) in September to 15.2 °C (59.4 °F) in January; revealing a noticeable seasonal lag in summer. Precipitation is very scarce, averaging 62.4 mm (2.46 in) per annum; and only occurs on 7.3 days annually.

Climate data for Bahía Tortugas (27.69°N 114.90°W) (14 m (46 ft) AMSL) (1991-2020)
| Month | Jan | Feb | Mar | Apr | May | Jun | Jul | Aug | Sep | Oct | Nov | Dec | Year |
|---|---|---|---|---|---|---|---|---|---|---|---|---|---|
| Record high °C (°F) | 31.0 (87.8) | 32.0 (89.6) | 35.0 (95.0) | 36.0 (96.8) | 38.0 (100.4) | 38.0 (100.4) | 40.0 (104.0) | 39.5 (103.1) | 43.0 (109.4) | 40.0 (104.0) | 37.0 (98.6) | 31.0 (87.8) | 43.0 (109.4) |
| Mean daily maximum °C (°F) | 20.7 (69.3) | 21.4 (70.5) | 22.0 (71.6) | 23.7 (74.7) | 23.9 (75.0) | 25.0 (77.0) | 28.2 (82.8) | 30.1 (86.2) | 30.3 (86.5) | 27.4 (81.3) | 24.3 (75.7) | 21.1 (70.0) | 24.8 (76.7) |
| Daily mean °C (°F) | 15.2 (59.4) | 15.8 (60.4) | 16.5 (61.7) | 17.7 (63.9) | 18.4 (65.1) | 19.8 (67.6) | 22.7 (72.9) | 24.3 (75.7) | 24.6 (76.3) | 21.7 (71.1) | 18.7 (65.7) | 15.8 (60.4) | 19.3 (66.7) |
| Mean daily minimum °C (°F) | 9.8 (49.6) | 10.2 (50.4) | 10.9 (51.6) | 11.8 (53.2) | 12.9 (55.2) | 14.6 (58.3) | 17.1 (62.8) | 18.6 (65.5) | 18.9 (66.0) | 16.1 (61.0) | 13.1 (55.6) | 10.4 (50.7) | 13.7 (56.7) |
| Record low °C (°F) | 3.0 (37.4) | 2.0 (35.6) | 4.0 (39.2) | 4.5 (40.1) | 7.0 (44.6) | 4.0 (39.2) | 9.0 (48.2) | 10.0 (50.0) | 2.4 (36.3) | 8.0 (46.4) | 6.0 (42.8) | 3.0 (37.4) | 2.0 (35.6) |
| Average precipitation mm (inches) | 9.1 (0.36) | 16.9 (0.67) | 10.3 (0.41) | 0.8 (0.03) | 0.0 (0.0) | 1.4 (0.06) | 0.2 (0.01) | 2.0 (0.08) | 5.0 (0.20) | 7.5 (0.30) | 7.6 (0.30) | 13.2 (0.52) | 74 (2.94) |
| Average precipitation days (≥ 0.1 mm) | 1.6 | 1.8 | 1.2 | 0.2 | 0.0 | 0.0 | 0.1 | 0.4 | 0.4 | 0.7 | 0.8 | 1.6 | 8.8 |
Source: Servicio Meteorológico Nacional

== See also ==
- Bahía Tortugas Airfield
