= KNNA =

KNNA may refer to:

- KNNA-FM, a radio station (99.1 FM) licensed to serve Nenana, Alaska, United States
- KNNA-LP, a radio station (95.7 FM) licensed to serve Lincoln, Nebraska, United States
