= WPLX =

WPLX may refer to:

- WPLX-LP, a low-power radio station (93.3 FM) licensed to serve Pelham, Alabama, United States
- WGUE (AM), a radio station (1180 AM) licensed to serve Turrell, Arkansas, United States, which held the call sign WPLX from 1987 to 2012
