= 1180 AM =

AM radio frequency

The following radio stations broadcast on AM frequency 1180 kHz: 1180 AM is United States clear-channel frequency; Class A status is held by WHAM in Rochester, New York.

1180 AM is the frequency used by Radio Martí, reportedly operating with 100,000 watts from a transmitter in Marathon in the Florida Keys. Because it is owned and operated by the U.S. Broadcasting Board of Governors, Radio Martí is not licensed by the Federal Communications Commission, and has no call letters. It is subject to jamming from Cuba where its directional antenna is pointed. As a consequence, other stations on 1180 in North America may experience interference at night from the jamming stations of Cuba.

== In Argentina ==
- LRI230 De La Sierra in Tandil, Buenos Aires

== In Chile ==
- CB-118 Radio Portales in Santiago, Metropolitan Region

== In Cuba ==
- CMGW in Santo Spiritus
- CMJL in Mayarí Arriba

== In Mexico ==
- XEFR-AM in Mexico City
- XEUBS-AM in La Paz, Baja California Sur

== In the United States ==
Stations in bold are clear-channel stations.

Call sign	City of license	Facility ID	Class	Daytime power (kW)	Nighttime power (kW)	Critical hours power (kW)	Unlimited power (kW)	Transmitter coordinates
KERN	Wasco-Greenacres, California	35899	B	10	10			35.571389°N 119.323889°W
KGOL	Humble, Texas	34473	B	50	3			30.139167°N 95.29°W
KLAY	Lakewood, Washington	11890	B	5	1			47.15°N 122.410556°W
KLPF	Midland, Texas	17235	D	25	0.215			31.933889°N 102.0425°W
KOFI	Kalispell, Montana	35368	B	50	10			48.197778°N 114.250833°W
KYES	Rockville, Minnesota	136921	B	50	5	8		45.361944°N 94.299167°W
KZOT	Bellevue, Nebraska	43237	B	25	1			41.27°N 95.786111°W
WFGN	Gaffney, South Carolina	72057	D	2.5				35.049722°N 81.645°W
WFYL	King of Prussia, Pennsylvania	22896	D	1				40.135°N 75.390833°W
WGAB	Newburgh, Indiana	48709	D	0.67	0.001			37.954444°N 87.418611°W
WGUE	Turrell, Arkansas	52906	D	5	0.026	3.5		35.141944°N 90.135°W
**WHAM**	Rochester, New York	37545	A				50	43.081944°N 77.725°W
WJNT	Pearl, Mississippi	7691	B	50	0.5	10		32.295278°N 90.115°W
WKCE	Knoxville, Tennessee	43771	D	10		2.6		35.98°N 83.819167°W
WLDS	Jacksonville, Illinois	30969	D	0.3	0.002			39.734444°N 90.197222°W
WSKP	Hope Valley, Rhode Island	3068	D	1.8		1		41.526667°N 71.743056°W
WSQR	Sycamore, Illinois	16409	D	0.9	0.001			42.006667°N 88.677778°W
WXLA	Dimondale, Michigan	16848	D	10		2		42.650278°N 84.580278°W
WZQZ	Trion, Georgia	16590	D	5				34.472778°N 85.325278°W
