= KFSD =

Radio station in Escondido, California

Coordinates: 33°07′2.1″N 117°07′12.1″W

- Escondido, California; United States
- Broadcast area: San Diego County
- Frequency: 1450 kHz
- Branding: Saint John Paul II Catholic Radio

Programming
- Language: English
- Format: Catholic radio

Ownership
- Owner: Raul Caro and Stephen Beuerle; (IHS Media)

History
- First air date: 1957
- Former call signs: KOWN (1957–1987); KOWA (1987–1990); KSPA (1990–2001); KFSD (2001–2002); KSPA (4/2002-8/2002)
- Call sign meaning: "First in San Diego" (from 1926 when the call sign was on AM 600 KOGO)

Technical information
- Licensing authority: FCC
- Facility ID: 49205
- Class: C
- Power: 1,000 watts

Links
- Public license information: Public file; LMS
- Website: jp2radio.com

KFSD (1450 AM) is a radio station based in North County, San Diego, California. It is owned by Raul Caro and Stephen Beuerle, through licensee IHS Media, and broadcasts a Catholic radio format. The station's transmitter is located in an industrial park in Escondido. KFSD is the only full-service radio station in IHS Media's Saint John Paul II (JP2) Catholic Radio network, which is also aired by low-power FM stations in San Diego (KCZP-LP 93.7), El Centro (KCJP-LP 95.7), and Brawley (K227BN 93.3).

== History of call sign ==
From 2004 until February 1, 2007, KFSD was a classical music radio station.

KFSD stands for "First in San Diego," dating back to the first commercial broadcast license in San Diego. The KFSD call letters were originally assigned in 1926 to AM 620 (later 600). The KFSD call sign was on 600 from 1926–1963. KFSD was also on FM 94.1 from 1948 to 1963, then re-appeared on 94.1 in 1973 until 1997. The KFSD-TV call sign was on Channel 10 from 1953–1963. The three KFSD stations switched to the KOGO call sign in 1963, as information about San Diego and its people were fed into a new IBM computer and asked for the perfect call letters for these stations, and it chose KOGO.

The last iteration of KFSD-FM 94.1 was as a classical station. KFSD had a good solid audience, but the station was bought by Nationwide Communications (division of Nationwide Insurance). Nationwide felt a change to more aggressive music was a better choice for the only 100 kW station in San Diego. KFSD was changed to KXGL, and became the Eagle 94.1. The Eagle's format proved to be a failure, and in 1998 became KJQY/KJOY 94.1.

== History ==
The station began life in 1957 as KOWN, broadcasting from studios on Hale Avenue on the eastern side of Escondido. In 1964, the station moved into studios in the then-new Escondido Village Mall, and added an FM station July 11, 1966, KOWN-FM, on 92.1 MHz. Shoppers could look through double-pane windows to see disc jockeys spinning records and the state-of-the-art (for 1964) Schafer automation system which played easy listening music on the FM station.

AM and FM transmitters stayed on Hale Avenue until 1972, when they were moved to a new location south of the city.

Both stations moved again in 1974, to studios in the Vineyard Shopping Center on Valley Parkway, just east of the Escondido Village Mall.

KFSD's call sign re-emerged on 92.1 in Escondido, now 92.1 Escondido, California, which now simulcasts KSON. The KFSD call letters were then transferred to AM 1450 where KFSD lives today.

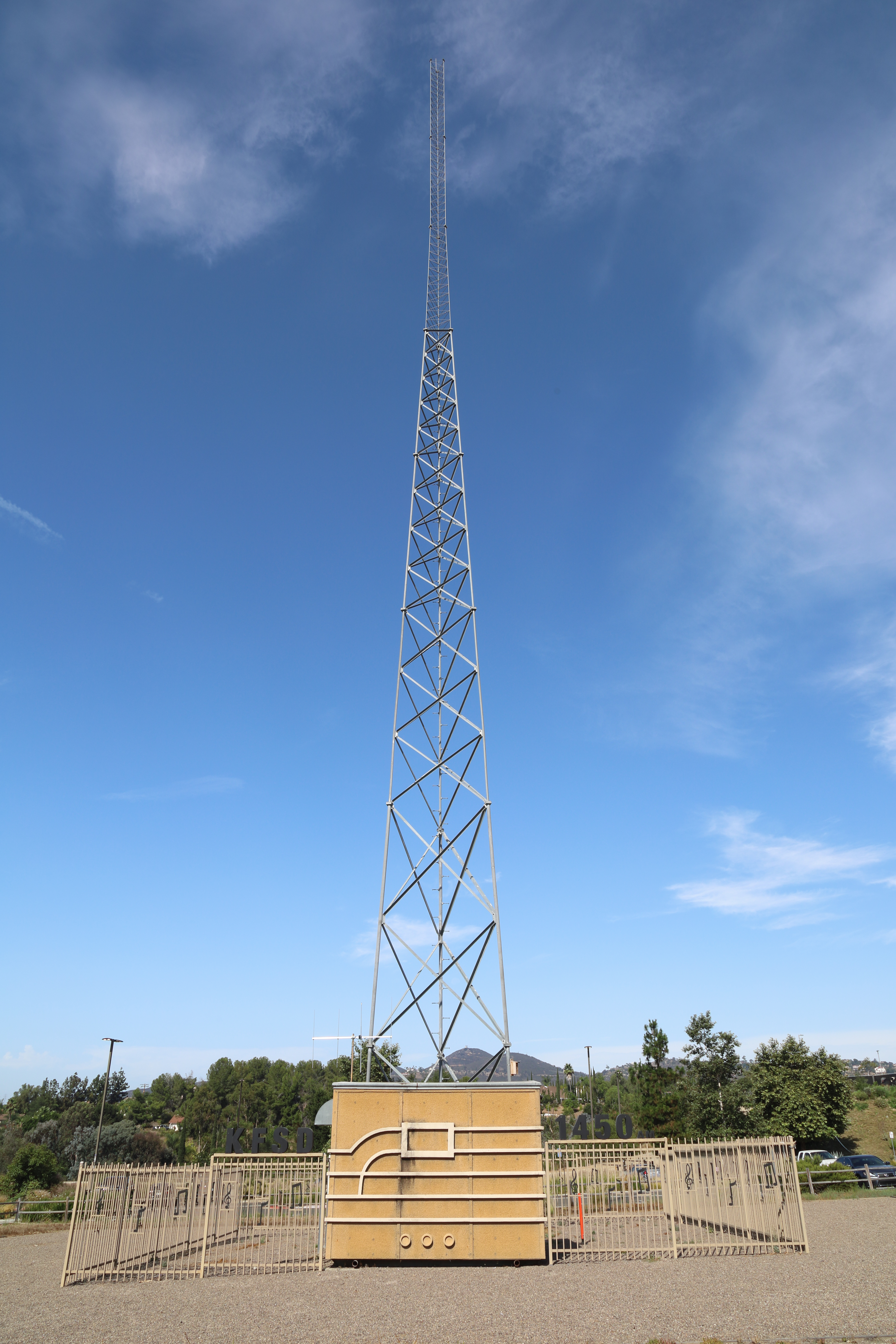
KFSD transmitter site in Escondido in 2022

From February 1, 2007 until March 15, 2010, KFSD was a simulcast of sister station KSPA featuring a nostalgia format, with music from the 1930s through the 1960s. The current format quoting from their website is: "Our philosophy is to blend the enduring standards of timeless artists with bold new interpretations from the younger vanguard". The simulcast began again on November 26, 2010, when the Astor Broadcast Group decided to drop KSPA's talk format to bring back the previous adult standards format. The format then continued until March 1, 2012, when it, along with KSPA, picked up the business talk format that had aired on KCEO.

As of June 6, 2011, KFSD has begun to broker time to San Diego Radio Seoul, who airs Korean programming weekdays from 6:00 am until 12 noon. Japanese programming also airs weekdays from 3:00 pm until 4 pm. This programming arrangement ended on February 8, 2012, as KFSD will switch to a business talk format that it is inheriting from sister station KCEO on March 7, 2012, when KCEO flips to Immaculate Heart Radio programming.

In February 2015, KFSD changed their format to country, branded as "KOW Country 1450".

On May 18, 2015, KFSD changed their format to Spanish Catholic religious, branded as "Guadalupe Radio". As of January 2017, both KFSD and KSPA ended their LMA with Guadalupe Radio and returned both stations to the previous adult standards format.

KFSD went off the air on June 1, 2019. In July 2020, North Shore Broadcasting sold KFSD to Raul Caro and Stephen Beuerle’s IHS Media for $125,000. IHS operates low-power FM "St. John Paul Catholic Radio” KCJP-LP in El Centro, California. The sale was consummated on November 13, 2020.
