= WMEX =

WMEX may refer to:

- WMEX (AM), a radio station (1510 AM) licensed to Quincy, Massachusetts serving the Greater Boston area, United States, the original station to use the call sign, from 1934 to 1978 and again since November 2014
- WMEX-LP, a radio station (105.9 FM) licensed to serve Rochester, New Hampshire, United States
- WMVY, a radio station (88.7 FM) licensed to serve Edgartown, Massachusetts, which used the call sign WMEX in May 2014
- WNHI, a radio station (106.5 FM) licensed to serve Farmington, New Hampshire, which used the call sign WMEX from February 2001 to June 2008
- WQOM, a radio station (1060 AM) licensed to serve Natick, Massachusetts, which used the call sign WMEX from October 1999 to January 2001
- WFYL, a radio station (1180 AM) licensed to serve King of Prussia, Pennsylvania, United States, which used the call sign WMEX from February 1999 to September 1999
- WEXP (FM), a radio station (102.9 FM) licensed to serve Westport, New York, United States, which used the call sign WMEX from September 1996 to February 1999
- WWDJ, a radio station (1150 AM) licensed to serve Boston, Massachusetts, which used the call sign WMEX from February 1985 to August 1996
- WMJK, a radio station (100.9 FM) licensed to serve Clyde, Ohio, United States, which used the call sign WMEX until February 1985
