= KKCA =

KKCA may refer to:

- KVPM, a radio station (95.7 FM) licensed to serve Arvin, California, United States, which held the call sign KKCA from 2015 to 2021
- KTGR-FM, a radio station (100.5 FM) licensed to serve Fulton, Missouri, United States, which held the call sign KKCA from 1971 to 2010
