= XHCE-FM =

Radio station in Oaxaca, Oaxaca, Mexico

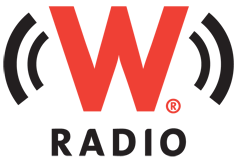

Oaxaca City, Oaxaca; Mexico
- Frequency: 95.7 FM
- Branding: W Radio

Programming
- Format: News/talk
- Affiliations: Radiópolis

Ownership
- Owner: CMI Oaxaca; (Complejo Satelital, S.A. de C.V.)

History
- First air date: March 20, 1964 (concession)

Technical information
- ERP: 25 kW
- Transmitter coordinates: 17°03′42.2″N 96°43′46.3″W

Links
- Webcast: Listen live
- Website: encuentroradiotv.com

XHCE-FM is a radio station on 95.7 FM in Oaxaca City, Oaxaca, Mexico. It is part of CMI, the media company owned by the López Lena family, and carries its W Radio news/talk format from Radiópolis.

== History ==
XECE-AM 1240 received its concession on March 20, 1964. It broadcast with 500 watts day and 250 night, and it was owned by José Antonio Ruiz de la Herran V. By the 1980s, it was owned by Emisoras Mexicanas de Oaxaca, S.A., and in 1994, it was authorized for a power increase from 1,000 watts to 2,500 during the day.

XECE received approval to migrate to FM in 2010.
