= Bahía Tortugas Airfield =

- IATA: none; ICAO: MX13; LID: BTR

Summary
- Airport type: Public
- Operator: N/A
- Serves: Bahía Tortugas
- Location: Mulegé Municipality, Baja California Sur state, Mexico
- Elevation AMSL: 102 ft / 31 m
- Coordinates: 27°42′19″N 114°54′40″W
- Interactive map of Bahía Tortugas Airfield

Runways
Direction	Length		Surface
Direction	ft	m	Surface
13/31	5,055	1,540	Asphalt

Bahía Tortugas Airfield (IATA: N/A) is a public paved airstrip located north of Bahía Tortugas, in the Municipality of Mulegé, Baja California Sur state, Mexico

Bahía Tortugas is a fishing town located on the Pacific Ocean coast.

== Air taxi service ==
Airlines	Destinations
Aeroservicios California Pacífico	Ensenada, Isla de Cedros
