= WGSF (AM) =

- Memphis, Tennessee; United States
- Broadcast area: Memphis metropolitan area
- Frequency: 1030 kHz
- Branding: Ambiente 101.5

Programming
- Format: Spanish-language, Latin music, news and opinion

Ownership
- Owner: Butron Media Corporation
- Sister stations: WGUE

History
- Former call signs: WXSS (1984–1996); WSFZ (1996–2000); WWGQ (2000)

Technical information
- Licensing authority: FCC
- Facility ID: 65207
- Class: D
- Power: 50,000 watts day 10,000 watts critical hours
- Transmitter coordinates: 35°11′0″N 89°56′16″W
- Translator: 101.5 W268DF (Memphis)

Links
- Public license information: Public file; LMS
- Webcast: Listen Live
- Website: ambiente1030.com

WGSF (1030 kHz) is a Spanish language AM radio station licensed to Memphis, Tennessee, United States. The station is owned by Butron Media Corporation.

== History ==
The station went on the air as WXSS on March 16, 1984. On April 1, 1996, the station changed its call sign to WSFZ; on March 22, 2000, to WWGQ; and on June 21, 2000, to the current WGSF.

Logo before translator sign on
