= XHAGA-FM =

Radio station in Aguascalientes, Aguascalientes, Mexico

- Aguascalientes, Aguascalientes; Mexico
- Frequency: 95.7 MHz
- Branding: Los 40

Programming
- Format: Spanish & English Top 40 (CHR)
- Affiliations: Radiópolis

Ownership
- Owner: Grupo Radiofónico ZER; (Radio AGS, S.A. de C.V.)

History
- First air date: October 29, 1993 (concession)
- Call sign meaning: "Aguascalientes"

Technical information
- Licensing authority: CRT
- Class: B1
- ERP: 25,000 watts
- HAAT: 84.91 meters (278.6 ft)
- Transmitter coordinates: 21°55′11.05″N 102°15′57.49″W

Links
- Webcast: Listen live
- Website: grupozer.mx

XHAGA-FM is a radio station on 95.7 FM in Aguascalientes, Aguascalientes, Mexico. It is owned by Radio AGS, S.A. de C.V. a subsidiary of Grupo Radiofónico Zer, and carries the Los 40 format from Radiópolis.

== History ==
XEAGA-AM 1200 received its concession on October 29, 1993. It was originally owned by Radio Familiar, S.A., and broadcast with 1 kW of power.

The station was sold in 2007 and migrated to FM in 2011.

XHAGA Previous Logo to 2016
