= KSPA =

South Asian radio station in Ontario, California

Coordinates: 34°05′41″N 117°36′46″W

- Ontario, California; United States
- Broadcast area: Inland Empire; Orange County; Greater Los Angeles
- Frequency: 1510 kHz
- Branding: Punjabi Radio USA 1510 AM

Programming
- Format: Punjabi Talk and Punjabi Music

Ownership
- Owner: Punjabi American Media

History
- First air date: 1946 (as KNSE)
- Former call signs: KOCS (1946–1958); KASK (1958–1967); KSOM (1967–1978); KNSE (1978–1998); KMSL (1998–1999); KIKA (1999–2001); KMXN (2001–2002)
- Call sign meaning: K The SPA (Former Format)

Technical information
- Licensing authority: FCC
- Facility ID: 13899
- Class: B
- Power: 10,000 watts day 1,000 watts night

Links
- Public license information: Public file; LMS

KSPA (1510 AM "Punjabi Radio USA 1510 AM) is a Punjabi radio station located in Ontario, California. KSPA airs a Punjabi Talk and Punjabi Music. KSPA is one of the South Asian Community in Southern California.

On June 1, 2016 KSPA was granted a Federal Communications Commission construction permit to increase night power to 6,000 watts.

== History ==
From March 15, 2010 until November 25, 2010, KSPA aired a talk radio format. From 2002 until March 2010, KSPA aired an adult standards format, known as The SPA, which from February 1, 2007 until March 15, 2010, was simulcast on sister station KFSD, expanding KSPA's signal into San Diego County. The station aired music programs on the weekends, including Big Band Jump with Don Kennedy, Jazz at The SPA with Jeff Gehringer, Sounds of Sinatra with Sid Mark, and Radio Deluxe with John Pizzarelli.

Prior to 2002, KSPA was classic country station KIKA (the call letters played off KIKF, which was a sister contemporary country station at the time). Before that, it was KMSL, which as of 2008 was the only all-sports station ever to broadcast in the Inland Empire market. The morning show was co-hosted by minor league baseball public address announcer David Achord and former National Football League running back Greg Bell. The station was owned by the Rancho Cucamonga Quakes baseball team and its call sign was derived from "muscle," a term associated with the stereotypical strength of athletes. KMSL aired Quakes games as part of its programming, as it does now.

Before that, it was the leading Spanish-language radio station in the area, KNSE (pronounced "KEEN-SAY" – quince is the Spanish word for the number fifteen).

In November 2010, program director Jeff Gehringer announced that the talk format failed to find an audience and would be dropped. On November 26, 2010, the day after Thanksgiving, KSPA began playing Christmas music, which was also airing on KFSD thus reviving the simulcast. On December 26, both stations returned to their previous adult standards format. That format lasted until March 1, 2012, when it flipped to a business talk format (also simulcast with KFSD) that it inherited from sister station KCEO. KSPA is rumored to be planning a switch to Cumulus Media's syndicated Nash FM country music format in early 2015. In February 2015 KSPA changed their format to country, branded as "KIK Country 1510".

On May 18, 2015 KSPA changed its format to Spanish Catholic religious, branded as "Guadalupe Radio". KSPA returned to adult standards on January 1, 2017. In mid-2017, San Jose-based Intelli LLC began operating KSPA under a time brokerage agreement and airing the "Viên Thao Radio" Vietnamese programming which also airs on Intelli's 1290 KAZA in Gilroy, California. In March 2018, Intelli purchased KSPA from Ontario Broadcasting for $1.35 million; the purchase was consummated on August 21, 2018. Intelli also owns KPAM in Troutdale, Oregon and KKOV in Vancouver, Washington.

KSPA went dark on May 6, 2020. The request for Special Temporary Authority to remain dark, filed two days later, gave the reason as "loss of transmitter site ... tower dismantled."

In March 2024, KSPA was purchased by Punjabi American Media for $100,000. The company owns nine other radio stations in Fresno, Sacramento, Bakersfield, Lodi and Yuba City, California.

== See also ==
- 2010 in radio
