= XHBV-FM =

Moroleón, Guanajuato; Mexico
- Frequency: 95.7 MHz
- Branding: Radio Alegría

Programming
- Format: Full service

Ownership
- Owner: Radio Moroleón, S.A. de C.V.

History
- First air date: September 12, 1979 (concession)
- Former frequencies: 1100 AM

Technical information
- ERP: 3 kW
- Transmitter coordinates: 20°05′53″N 101°11′14″W

Links
- Website: www.radiomoroleon.mx/inicio/

XHBV-FM is a radio station on 95.7 FM in Moroleón, Guanajuato. XHBV carries a full service format known as Radio Alegría.

== History ==
XHBV began as XEBV-AM 1100, with a concession awarded on September 12, 1979. It operated as a 500-watt daytimer on 1100 kHz and was owned by María del Rosario Valencia de Moreno. By the end of its time on AM, it was operating with 5 kW day and 1 kW night.
