= XHPEBX-FM =

Radio station in Cintalapa de Figueroa, Chiapas, Mexico

Cintalapa de Figueroa, Chiapas; Mexico
- Frequency: 95.7 FM
- Branding: Radio Estrella

Programming
- Format: Christian

Ownership
- Owner: Erasmo Ángel Ruiz

History
- First air date: May 2019
- Call sign meaning: (templated callsign)

Technical information
- Class: A

Links
- Website: XHPEBX-FM on Facebook

XHPEBX-FM is a radio station on 95.7 FM in Cintalapa de Figueroa, Chiapas, Mexico. The station is owned by Erasmo Ángel Ruiz and is a Christian station known as Radio Estrella.

== History ==
Ciencia, Comunicación y Tecnología filed for a permit station in Cintalapa de Figueroa on August 27, 2009. The application was filed 17 minutes apart from one by Amadeo Coutiño Aguilar. While the IFT had initially planned to award just one station on April 25, 2018, due to the fact that the applications were filed within the same hour, the IFT opted to award both stations and reject a 2013 application by Promoción y Fomento Cultural, A.C. As the Coutiño Aguilar station, awarded as XHPEAQ-FM, had been filed earlier, this unanimous decision by the IFT's commissioners allowed Radio Estrella to become a legal station.

XHPEBX went on the air in May 2019, relocating religious pirate station Radio Estrella from 95.9 MHz, where it had operated since at least 2011.
