= XHEPAS-FM =

Radio station in Punta Abreojos, Mulegé, Baja California Sur

- Mulegé, Baja California Sur; Mexico
- Frequency: 94.9 FM

Ownership
- Owner: David Meza Carlón
- Sister stations: XHPAS-FM

History
- First air date: February 26, 1996 (concession)
- Call sign meaning: Punta AbreojoS

Technical information
- Licensing authority: CRT
- Class: B1
- ERP: 25 kW
- HAAT: 53.9 m (177 ft)
- Transmitter coordinates: 26°43′27″N 113°34′30″W

XHEPAS-FM is a radio station on 94.9 FM in Mulegé, Baja California Sur.

== History ==
XEPAS-AM 1200 received its concession on February 26, 1996. It moved to FM in 2010.
