= XHSDM-FM =

Radio station in Santo Domingo, Ocosingo, Chiapas

- Santo Domingo, Chiapas, Mexico; Mexico
- Broadcast area: Santo Domingo, Chiapas
- Frequency: 95.7 FM
- Branding: La Voz de la Selva

Programming
- Format: Public radio

Ownership
- Owner: Government of the State of Chiapas

History
- First air date: January 25, 2000
- Call sign meaning: Santo DoMingo

Technical information
- ERP: 1 kW
- Transmitter coordinates: 17°01′37″N 91°24′55″W

Links
- Website: La Voz de la Selva

XHSDM-FM is a radio station on 95.7 FM in Santo Domingo, located in the municipality of Ocosingo, Chiapas in Mexico. It is part of the state-owned Radio Chiapas state network and is known as La Voz de la Selva.

XHSDM signed on in January 2000.
