= XHPVBB-FM =

Radio station in Puerto Vallarta, Jalisco

- Puerto Vallarta, Jalisco; Mexico
- Frequency: 98.3 FM (HD Radio)
- Branding: Radiante FM

Programming
- Format: Pop/rock

Ownership
- Owner: CPS Media; (Compañía Periodística Sudcalifornia, S.A. de C.V.)
- Sister stations: TV Mar (XHCPPV-TDT 10.1)

History
- First air date: May 21, 2018
- Call sign meaning: Puerto Vallarta/Bahía de Banderas

Technical information
- Licensing authority: CRT
- Class: B1
- ERP: 25 kW
- HAAT: −119.6 m (−392 ft)
- Transmitter coordinates: 20°36′33.12″N 105°13′47.38″W

Links
- Website: radiante.fm

XHPVBB-FM is a radio station on 98.3 FM in Puerto Vallarta, Jalisco. It is owned by CPS Media and is known as Radiante FM.

== History ==
XHPVBB was awarded in the IFT-4 radio auction of 2017 and came to air on May 21, 2018. CPS Media, an arm of Grupo Editorial Tribuna, was formed from the three FM stations won in the IFT-4 auction by Compañía Periodística Sudcaliforniana (Puerto Vallarta, La Paz and San José del Cabo), as well as the three TV transmitters in the same cities that were won in the IFT-6 television station auction.

Attempts by Tribuna to enter broadcasting had stretched back to 1995, when the company made requests for the federal government to make available new commercial radio stations. While these were approved in early 2000, the government of Vicente Fox did not award any of the stations. The Puerto Vallarta FM frequency was obtained after an initial high bidder, Garro Radiodifusora, declined to pay for the frequency; XHPVBB's cost of 45.7 million pesos makes it the third-most expensive station in IFT-4 after Televisa Radio's XHPTOJ-FM 91.1, which went for 52.4 million pesos, and XHPBCQ-FM in Cancún, won by Grupo Radio Centro at a price of 86.5 million pesos.
