= WZQZ =

Radio station in Trion, Georgia

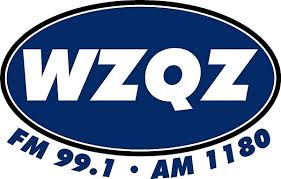
- Trion, Georgia; United States
- Broadcast area: Summerville, Georgia; Rome, Georgia; LaFayette, Georgia
- Frequency: 1180 kHz
- Branding: WZQZ AM 1180

Programming
- Format: Classic country

Ownership
- Owner: HS Productions, Inc.

Technical information
- Licensing authority: FCC
- Facility ID: 16590
- Class: D
- Power: 5,000 watts (days only)
- Transmitter coordinates: 34°28′22″N 85°19′31″W
- Translator: 99.1 W256DP (Summerville)

Links
- Public license information: Public file; LMS
- Website: official website

WZQZ 1180 AM is a radio station broadcasting a country music format. Licensed to Trion, Georgia, the station serves the areas of Summerville, Georgia, Rome, Georgia, and La Fayette, Georgia. WZQZ is currently owned by HS Productions, Inc. The station is in association with NBC Radio News and the Georgia News Network for news broadcasts, and produce their own local news programs. Jimmy Holbrook owns both AM 1180 and HS Productions and moderates as weekday reporter and DJ for the station along with Bonnie Fletcher. The station has six local newscasts daily and serves as the only daily local news source for Chattooga County. The station's signal can also be heard 24 hours-a-day on WSKY Television channel 21.8 (Charter Cable 184).

1180 AM is a United States clear-channel frequency.
