= Punta Eugenia =

Headland in Baja California Sur, Mexico

- Headland
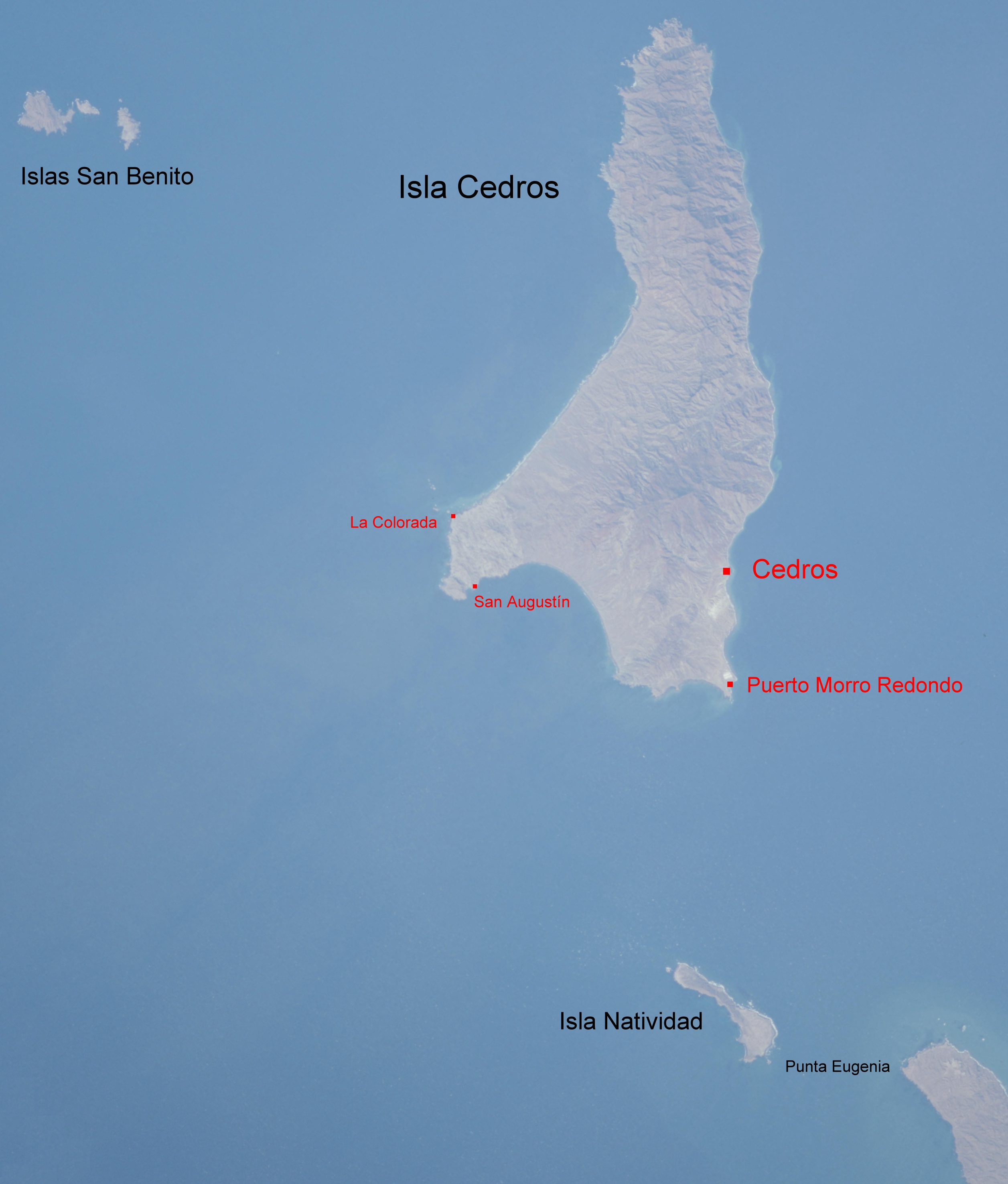
- An annotated Space Shuttle photo showing Punta Eugenia bottom right.

- Coordinates: 27°50′49″N 115°4′54″W

Punta Eugenia is a headland in the municipality of Mulegé in the Mexican state of Baja California Sur. It marks the western tip of the Vizcaíno Peninsula, making it the westernmost point on the mainland of the state. It belongs to the larger area of El Vizcaíno Biosphere Reserve; it is separated from the mainland of the Baja California Peninsula by the Vizcaíno Desert. Infrastructural developments, like the completion of the Vizcaíno-Bahía Tortugas Highway recently allowed for better integration of the traditionally secluded area (Punta Eugenia can be accessed from Bahía Tortugas by a dirt road). Touristically, the area of Punta Eugenia is still largely unexploited. The settlement Punta Eugenia, with 19 inhabitants in 2017, is traditionally populated by native and seasonally recruited fishermen and their families. Fishing industry in the Vizcaíno region annually produces thousands of tons of various species, which are mostly exported to Asian and North American markets.

To the northwest of Punta Eugenia lie Isla Natividad, Cedros Island and the Islas San Benito. The pattern of ocean currents and eddies around Punta Eugenia has been shown to be a significant phylogeographic break in the distribution of fish species.

== Climate ==
Punta Eugenia has mild desert climate. Temperature extremes range from 36 °C (97 °F) on 11 October 1983 to 1 °C (34 °F) on 9 February 1981. On 4 December 1994, Punta Eugenia received 109 millimetres (4.3 in) of rain, the wettest day on record.

Climate data for Punta Eugenia 1981-2010 normals (elevation 10 m)
Month	Jan	Feb	Mar	Apr	May	Jun	Jul	Aug	Sep	Oct	Nov	Dec	Year
Record high °C (°F)	29.0 (84.2)	28.0 (82.4)	32.0 (89.6)	32.0 (89.6)	34.0 (93.2)	30.0 (86.0)	32.0 (89.6)	34.0 (93.2)	34.0 (93.2)	36.0 (96.8)	35.0 (95.0)	31.0 (87.8)	36.0 (96.8)
Mean daily maximum °C (°F)	19.7 (67.5)	19.8 (67.6)	20.7 (69.3)	21.5 (70.7)	21.3 (70.3)	21.8 (71.2)	24.0 (75.2)	25.3 (77.5)	25.1 (77.2)	23.7 (74.7)	22.4 (72.3)	20.1 (68.2)	22.1 (71.8)
Daily mean °C (°F)	16.1 (61.0)	16.0 (60.8)	16.7 (62.1)	17.4 (63.3)	17.6 (63.7)	18.2 (64.8)	20.1 (68.2)	21.6 (70.9)	21.6 (70.9)	20.3 (68.5)	18.7 (65.7)	16.4 (61.5)	18.4 (65.1)
Mean daily minimum °C (°F)	12.5 (54.5)	12.2 (54.0)	12.7 (54.9)	13.3 (55.9)	13.8 (56.8)	14.7 (58.5)	16.3 (61.3)	17.9 (64.2)	18.1 (64.6)	17.0 (62.6)	15.1 (59.2)	12.6 (54.7)	14.7 (58.5)
Record low °C (°F)	4.0 (39.2)	1.0 (33.8)	4.0 (39.2)	2.0 (35.6)	2.0 (35.6)	2.0 (35.6)	3.0 (37.4)	5.0 (41.0)	5.0 (41.0)	5.0 (41.0)	6.0 (42.8)	5.0 (41.0)	1.0 (33.8)
Average precipitation mm (inches)	10.8 (0.43)	6.2 (0.24)	1.1 (0.04)	0.1 (0.00)	0.1 (0.00)	0.0 (0.0)	0.2 (0.01)	0.6 (0.02)	1.0 (0.04)	1.4 (0.06)	2.5 (0.10)	18.8 (0.74)	42.8 (1.69)
Average precipitation days (≥ 0.2 mm)	1.6	1.0	0.3	0.1	0.0	0.0	0.1	0.1	0.3	0.2	0.4	1.9	6.0
Source: Servicio Meteorológico Nacional
