= TV Mar =

Regional television network in western Mexico

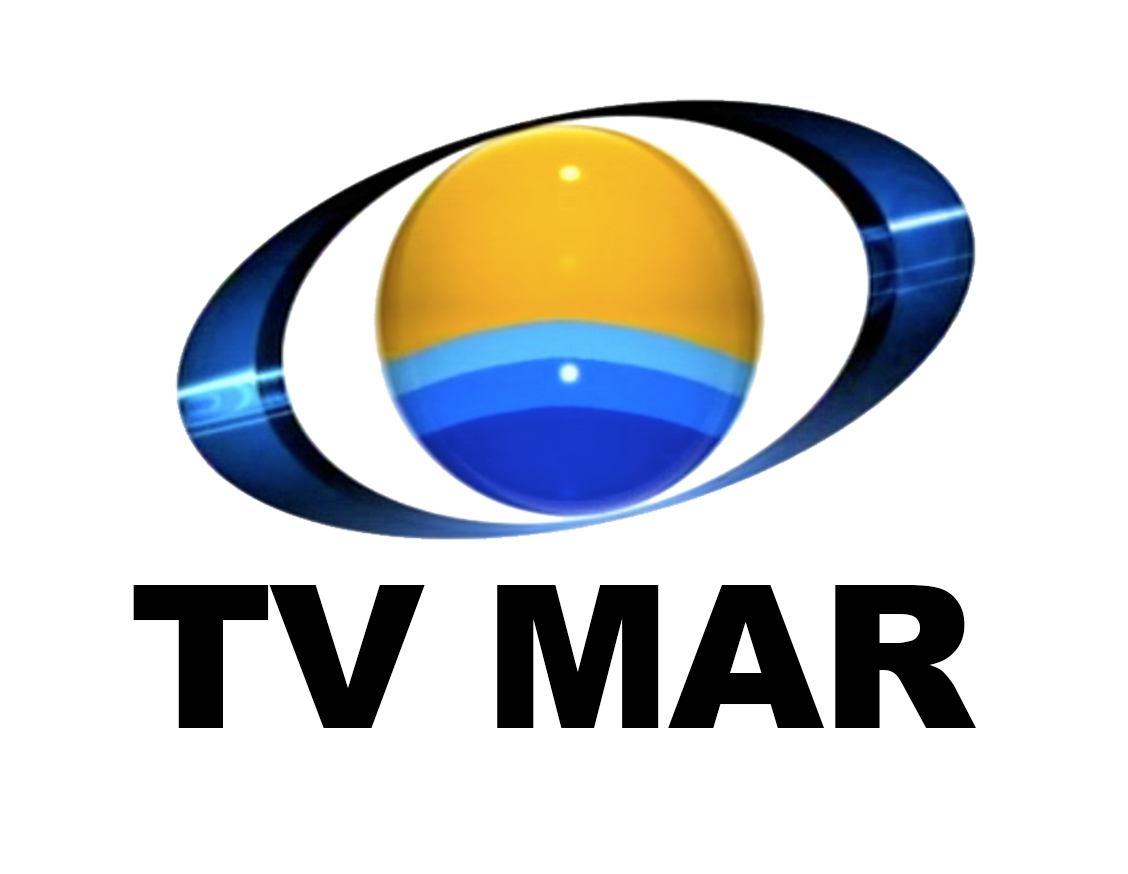
TV MAR Logo

TV Mar is the brand name for three television stations operating in western Mexico, owned and operated by CPS Media.

== History ==
The TV Mar stations were awarded in the IFT-6 television station auction of 2017. Corporación Periodística Sudcaliforniana, S.A. de C.V. paid 5.179 million and 5.019 million pesos, respectively, for the stations in La Paz and Los Cabos, Baja California Sur. However, a bidding war arose for the third station CPS would obtain, at Puerto Vallarta, with CPS's winning bid of 20.179 million pesos coming in the 21st subsequent round of the auction.

Facility construction for the TV Mar stations was contemporaneous with the Radiante FM stations that CPS had previously won in all three cities in the IFT-4 radio auction (XHPLPZ-FM, XHPSJC-FM and XHPVBB-FM). The first station to begin operations was Puerto Vallarta, which began program service on December 3, 2018. The La Paz station entered program service on February 18, 2019, followed by Los Cabos on October 28, 2019.

== Programming ==
TV Mar is a general-entertainment television station with a wide variety of programming. Much of TV Mar's entertainment programming is sourced from Televisión Española, including series and children's programming. Other content comes from the state networks of Morelos and Veracruz and other independent producers. TV Mar launched in Puerto Vallarta with a series of local programs, including Por una Causa (For a Cause), a show spotlighting civil society organizations in the region; La Receta, featuring local chefs; and a music show, Por Fin es Viernes, on Friday nights.

=== News ===
TV Mar broadcasts four and a half hours of local news each weekday on CPS Noticias, simulcast on Radiante FM. There is no local news on weekends.

== Stations ==
The TV Mar system consists of three stations, all broadcasting on virtual channel 10. XHCPCS-TDT has two transmitters.

Station	City	RF channel	Virtual channel	ERP	HAAT	Transmitter coordinates
XHCPBC-TDT	La Paz	23	10	112.850 kW	−31.2 m (−102 ft)	24°09′38″N 110°18′06″W
XHCPCS-TDT	San José del Cabo, Baja California Sur	35	10	56.09 kW	284.5 m (933 ft)	23°01′49.48″N 109°43′43.39″W
XHCPCS-TDT	Cabo San Lucas, Baja California Sur	35	10	14.29 kW	284.5 m (933 ft)	22°55′44″N 109°51′54″W
XHCPPV-TDT	Puerto Vallarta, Jalisco	27	10	90.070 kW	−338.2 m (−1,110 ft)	20°36′33.12″N 105°13′47.38″W
