= XHEXL-FM =

Radio station in Pátzcuaro, Michoacán

- Pátzcuaro, Michoacán; Mexico
- Frequency: 94.9 FM
- Branding: La Ley

Programming
- Format: Regional Mexican

Ownership
- Owner: Medios Radiofónicos Michoacán; (XEXL, S.A. de C.V.)
- Sister stations: XHPAT-FM

History
- First air date: January 22, 1955 (concession)

Technical information
- ERP: 6 kW
- Transmitter coordinates: 19°32′39.89″N 101°36′47.31″W

Links
- Website: radiomejor.com

XHEXL-FM is a radio station on 94.9 FM in Pátzcuaro, Michoacán. It is owned by Medios Radiofónicos Michoacán and known as La Ley with a Regional Mexican format.

== History ==
XEXL-AM 1020 received its concession on January 22, 1955. It was owned by Josefina Rodríguez de Laris and broadcast with 1,000 watts. In November 1982, the concession was transferred to a corporation.

In the 1990s, XEXL was moved to 690 kHz and increased its power to 1,500 watts. This facility was used to conduct Mexico's first public demonstrations of HD Radio on AM in May 2007, to coincide with the annual conference of the National Chamber of the Radio and Television Industry (CIRT), held that year in Pátzcuaro. Normal programs were not broadcast in HD Radio, as it took until 2011 for stations in interior Mexico to be cleared to use the technology.

In 2011, XEXL was authorized to migrate to FM as XHEXL-FM 94.9.
