= KKDA =

KKDA may refer to:

- KKDA-FM, a radio station (104.5 FM) licensed to Dallas, Texas, United States
- KKDA (AM), a radio station (730 AM) licensed to Grand Prairie, Texas, United States
- KKDA, the Delhi Metro station code for Karkarduma metro station, Delhi, India
