= XHATF-FM =

Atlacomulco, Mexico; Mexico
- Frequency: 95.7 FM
- Branding: Cadena Azul

Programming
- Format: Spanish oldies

Ownership
- Owner: Fundación Educacional de Medios, A.C.
- Operator: Rotativo de México

History
- First air date: July 1, 2020
- Call sign meaning: Atlacomulco de Fabela

Technical information
- Class: A
- ERP: 3 kW
- HAAT: −34.8 m (−114 ft)
- Transmitter coordinates: 19°47′45.6″N 99°52′25.2″W

Links
- Webcast: Listen live
- Website: www.rotativodemexico.com/cadena-azul-radio/

XHATF-FM is a radio station broadcasting on 95.7 FM from Atlacomulco, State of Mexico. XHATF is a social station owned by Fundación Educacional de Medios, A.C., and operated by Rotativo de México as "Cadena Azul" with a Spanish oldies format. Programming originates from studios in the state capital of Toluca.

== History ==
On April 11, 2018, the Federal Telecommunications Institute approved the award of a social radio station to Fundación Educacional de Medios, A.C., on an application the social group had made in 2016. The station began broadcasting July 1, 2020, under Rotativo operation, with Spanish-language oldies music and a morning news program known as Sin Filtro.
