= Bahía Asunción Airstrip =

- IATA: -; ICAO: MX10; LID: BSU

Summary
- Airport type: Public
- Operator: N/A
- Serves: Bahía Asunción
- Location: Mulegé Municipality, Baja California Sur state, Mexico
- Elevation AMSL: 130 ft / 39 m
- Coordinates: 27°11′01″N 114°16′38″W
- Interactive map of Bahía Asunción Airstrip

Runways
Direction	Length		Surface
Direction	ft	m	Surface
17/35	5,451	1,661	Dirt

Bahía Asunción Airstrip (IATA: N/A) is a public dirt airstrip located north of Bahía Asunción, Municipality of Mulegé, Baja California Sur, Mexico, on the Pacific Ocean coast. It has a landing strip 1,647 meters long and 23 meters wide.

The airstrip is used solely for general aviation purposes.
