= XHPTEA-FM =

Radio station in Soteapan–Acayucan, Veracruz, Mexico

Soteapan, Veracruz; Mexico
- Broadcast area: Acayucan
- Frequency: 94.9 MHz
- Branding: Istmo 94.9

Programming
- Format: Contemporary hit radio

Ownership
- Owner: Arturo Ordaz Gallegos

History
- First air date: September 3, 2020
- Call sign meaning: SoTEApan

Technical information
- Class: A
- ERP: 1 kW
- HAAT: 126.5 m (415 ft)
- Transmitter coordinates: 18°15′42″N 94°54′15″W

Links
- Webcast: Listen live
- Website: istmo949.com

XHPTEA-FM is a radio station on 94.9 FM in Soteapan, Veracruz, Mexico with studios in Acayucan. It is owned by Arturo Ordaz Gallegos and is known as Istmo 94.9 with a contemporary hit radio format.

== History ==
XHPTEA was awarded in the IFT-4 radio auction of 2017 on a rebound after the initial winning bidder, Tecnoradio, was disqualified from the auction. The winning bid by Arturo Ordaz Gallegos was 1.52 million pesos.
