= WUDS-LP =

- Woodstock, Virginia; United States
- Broadcast area: Woodstock, Virginia; Edinburg, Virginia
- Frequency: 94.9 MHz

Programming
- Format: Classic Top 40

Ownership
- Owner: Massanutten Military Academy

History
- First air date: October 5, 2015
- Call sign meaning: Woodstock

Technical information
- Licensing authority: Federal Communications Commission
- Facility ID: 193540
- Class: L1
- ERP: 100 watts
- HAAT: −46.8 meters (−154 ft)
- Transmitter coordinates: 38°52′33.0″N 78°30′39.0″W

Links
- Public license information: LMS

WUDS-LP is broadcast radio station licensed to Woodstock, Virginia and served Woodstock and Edinburg in Virginia. The station currently airs a Classic Top 40 format. WUDS-LP is owned and operated by Massanutten Military Academy.

== History ==
On October 10, 2023, Massanutten Military Academy filed a Request for Silent Authority, allowing the station to be taken silent. In the request, the station cited "staffing difficulties" and requesting "180 days in which to remain silent". However, in a post on the station's official Facebook page, dated the same day, an employee of the station said it had "gone off the air, permanently", making no mention of the aforementioned "staffing difficulties".

At a September 3, 2024 meeting of the Woodstock town council a town resident "implored" the council to help save the station. Councilmember A. Paje Cross suggested that Shenandoah County Public Schools might a better option to help save the radio station. The resident asked Woodstock Mayor Jeremy McCleary if the Town of Woodstock would be open to "[s]ponsoring [the station] in terms of being an advocate". McCleary said that the town may be open to assigning the topic to a town committee and exploring options. He also said "I don't think the town will, in any way, operate this thing, but maybe there's a way we can support or help out?"

It was also learned, at the town council meeting, that the station fell silent due to, not only lack of cadet participation (earlier referred to as "staffing difficulties"), but also financial challenges.

On October 6, 2024, WUDS-LP returned to the air. Had the station not returned to the air by October 10, 2024, its license to broadcast would have expired per FCC rules.
