= XHMPJ-FM =

Radio station in La Paz, Baja California Sur

- San José del Cabo, Baja California Sur; Mexico
- Broadcast area: Los Cabos
- Frequency: 91.5 FM
- Branding: Super Stereo Miled

Programming
- Format: News/talk

Ownership
- Owner: Luis Roberto Márquez Pizano
- Operator: Grupo Miled
- Sister stations: XHBCPZ-FM La Paz

History
- First air date: February 29, 2020
- Call sign meaning: Márquez Pizano San José del Cabo

Technical information
- Licensing authority: CRT
- Class: A
- ERP: 1 kW
- HAAT: 150 m (490 ft)
- Transmitter coordinates: 23°01′49.1″N 109°43′45″W

XHMPJ-FM is a non-commercial radio station on 91.5 FM in San José del Cabo, Baja California Sur. The station is operated by Grupo Miled and owned by Luis Roberto Márquez Pizano; it carries a Spanish adult hits format known as Super Stereo Miled.

== History ==
In 2015, the IFT made available a Class A social station frequency for San José del Cabo. Two applicants filed for the frequency: Fundación Radiodifusoras Capital Jalisco and Luis Roberto Márquez Pizano. On February 14, 2018, the IFT awarded the station to Márquez Pizano on diversity criteria as being related to the fewest stations among the applicants.

XHMPJ signed on February 29, 2020, leased to Grupo Larsa Comunicaciones. It flipped to El Heraldo Radio in September 2020 and then to Super Stereo Miled in October 2021.
