= WFYL =

- King of Prussia, Pennsylvania; United States
- Broadcast area: Philadelphia metropolitan area
- Frequency: 1180 kHz

Programming
- Format: Christian talk and teaching

Ownership
- Owner: Lighthouse Support
- Sister stations: WBPH-TV, WLYH-TV

History
- First air date: December 1976; 49 years ago
- Former call signs: WVFC (1976–1999); WMEX (1999); WVFC (1999–2004)
- Call sign meaning: Philadelphia (using FY in place of PHI)

Technical information
- Licensing authority: FCC
- Facility ID: 22896
- Class: D
- Power: 1,000 watts (day)
- Transmitter coordinates: 40°8′5.52″N 75°23′27.37″W

Links
- Public license information: Public file; LMS
- Website: www.1180wfyl.com

WFYL (1180 AM) is a daytime-only radio station licensed to King of Prussia, Pennsylvania, and serving the Philadelphia metropolitan area. It broadcasts a Christian talk and teaching format. WFYL is owned by Lighthouse Support, a non-profit organization specializing in Christian broadcasting.. Lighthouse also owns television stations WBPH-TV 60 in Bethlehem, Pennsylvania, and WLYH-TV 49 in Red Lion, Pennsylvania.

By day, WFYL is powered at 1,000 watts, using a non-directional antenna. But at night, WFYL must go off the air to avoid interference with WHAM in Rochester, New York, the Class A station on 1180 AM. WFYL's Valcom whip antenna and transmitter are located at the Jeffersonville Golf Club in Trooper, Pennsylvania.
