= XHBCPZ-FM =

Radio station in La Paz, Baja California Sur

- La Paz, Baja California Sur; Mexico
- Frequency: 95.1 MHz
- Branding: Super Stereo Miled

Programming
- Format: Music Regional Mexican

Ownership
- Owner: Luis Roberto Márquez Pizano
- Operator: Grupo Miled
- Sister stations: XHMPJ-FM Los Cabos

History
- First air date: February 14, 2020
- Call sign meaning: From "BCS" and "La Paz"

Technical information
- Licensing authority: CRT
- Class: B1
- ERP: 25 kW
- HAAT: −16.3 m (−53 ft)
- Transmitter coordinates: 24°05′45.76″N 110°23′54.44″W

XHBCPZ-FM is a non-commercial radio station on 95.1 FM in La Paz, Baja California Sur, Mexico. The station is owned by Luis Roberto Márquez Pizano.

== History ==
In 2015, the IFT made available a Class B1 social station frequency for La Paz. Three applicants filed for the frequency: Fundación Radiodifusoras Capital Jalisco, Luis Roberto Márquez Pizano, and Fundación Cultural para la Sociedad Mexicana. On March 7, 2018, the IFT awarded the station to Márquez Pizano on diversity criteria as being related to the fewest stations among the applicants.

XHBCPZ signed on February 14, 2020, leased to Grupo Larsa Comunicaciones, which programmed it with a Spanish adult hits format known as Toño. The station changed to El Heraldo Radio on August 31, 2020. In September 2021, it dropped Heraldo Radio and became Super Stereo Miled.
