= Bahía Asunción =

Mexican town

Coordinates: 27°08′26″N 114°17′48″W

Bahía Asunción is a town in Baja California Sur, Mexico.

It is in Mulegé Municipality on the west coast of the peninsula. It is southeast of Bahía Tortugas.

== Media ==
- XHANS-FM
- XHBAC-FM

== See also ==
- Bahía Asunción Airstrip
