= XHPAS-FM =

Radio station in Punta Abreojos, Mulegé, Baja California Sur

- Mulegé, Baja California Sur; Mexico
- Frequency: 91.7 FM

Ownership
- Owner: Alicia Carlón Toledo
- Sister stations: XHEPAS-FM

History
- First air date: February 26, 1996 (concession)
- Call sign meaning: Punta AbreojoS

Technical information
- Licensing authority: CRT
- Class: A
- ERP: 3 kW
- HAAT: 56.3 m (185 ft)

XHPAS-FM is a radio station on 91.7 FM in Mulegé, Baja California Sur.

== History ==
XHPAS received its concession on February 26, 1996.
