= WXRC =

- Hickory, North Carolina; United States
- Broadcast area: Metrolina
- Frequency: 95.7 MHz
- Branding: 95.7 The Ride

Programming
- Format: Classic hits

Ownership
- Owner: Pacific Broadcasting Group Inc,

History
- First air date: 1962
- Former call signs: WIRC-FM (1962–1966)
- Call sign meaning: "X-Rock" (previous branding)

Technical information
- Licensing authority: FCC
- Facility ID: 51174
- Class: C0
- ERP: 100,000 watts
- HAAT: 311 meters (1,020 ft)
- Transmitter coordinates: 35°27′16.50″N 81°3′45.30″W

Links
- Public license information: Public file; LMS
- Website: www.957theride.com

WXRC (95.7 FM, "95.7 The Ride") is a commercial radio station licensed to Hickory, North Carolina, serving the Charlotte market. The station is owned by David Lingafelt through his Pacific Broadcasting Group, and broadcasts a classic hits format. Its studios are located in Newton and its broadcast tower is located east of Lincolnton, North Carolina.

WXRC airs Acoustic Storm, an acoustic based set, Sundays from 8 a.m. to 11 a.m. and 9 p.m. to midnight. The station is the Charlotte affiliate for North Carolina State Wolfpack football and basketball.

== History ==
On May 8, 1962, the Federal Communications Commission granted Foothills Broadcasting, Inc. a construction permit for a new FM station on 95.7 MHz with an effective radiated power (ERP) of 11,300 watts. The station was granted its first license on January 24, 1963, with the WIRC-FM call sign.

The station's call sign was changed to WXRC effective September 26, 1966. On January 13, 1967, Foothills Broadcasting applied for a construction permit to increase the station's ERP to 27,000 watts. The FCC granted the permit on March 13, 1967, followed by a new license with the upgraded facilities on April 2, 1968.

On April 19, 1979, Foothills Broadcasting applied for a construction permit to increase the station's ERP to 100,000 watts. The FCC granted the permit on February 5, 1980, followed by a new license with the upgraded facilities on January 27, 1981.

From the early 1980s to 1985, WXRC was "X-Rock", an adult contemporary format using the automated TM Stereo Rock programming service.

On March 28, 1984, Foothills Broadcasting applied for a construction permit to relocate the station's transmitter to "SMITH MOUNTAIN, 3.7 KILOMETERS SOUTH-SW OF CONNELLYS SPRINGS" with an accompanying increase in the station's height above average terrain (HAAT) to 389 meters (1,276 ft). Three months later, on June 21, 1984, the FCC granted a voluntary reassignment of the station's license from Foothills Broadcasting, Inc. to Broadcast, Ltd with a consummation date of December 11, 1984. The FCC granted the construction permit on November 20, 1984 and granted a new license with the new facilities on August 21, 1985. On July 31, 1985, the FCC granted a voluntary reassignment of the station's license from Broadcast, Ltd to Westcom, Ltd. with a consummation date of September 20, 1985.

In 1985, the station changed to local album-oriented rock, changing its name from "X-Rock" to "The Rock", and targeting older listeners rather than fans of Mötley Crüe. Programmed in the first year by local native and Appalachian State Graduate Greg Mull (WRXK-FM and WXTB) and fellow ASU graduates Justin 'Jay' Phelps and Jon Austin, the station placed in the top 10 of Charlotte Arbitron ratings during Fall 1985 and Spring 1986, dropping to number eleven in summer 1986 after the debut of similarly formatted WRFX. After Mull's departure in 1986, both Phelps and Austin served in music director roles, under various hired program directors in the 1980s including Bob Raleigh who later went on to launch classic rock WCKN (now WROQ) in Greenville, SC. Raleigh also went on to become a corporate programmer for many years at Cumulus Media and Westwood One Network.

On March 7, 1986, Westcom, Ltd. applied for a construction permit to change the transmitter location to "2.1 KM W-SW OF INTERSECTION OF STATE RTE. 1382 & 1360, 7.1 KM SW OF DENVER, NEAR DENVER, NC" with an accompanying decrease in the station's HAAT to 335 meters (1,099 ft) and a change in the directional antenna pattern (see Signal note below). The FCC granted the permit on August 4, 1988. On December 14, 1989, the FCC granted a modification to the construction permit requested by Westcom, Ltd. to move the transmitter to "LINCOLN COUNTY, 0.5 KM SW OF INTERSECTION OF STATE ROUTES 73 & 1385". The FCC granted a new license with the upgraded facilities on May 4, 1990.

On October 5, 1994, the FCC granted a voluntary reassignment of the station's license from Westcom, Ltd. to Pacific Broadcasting Group, Inc. The sale consummated on November 22, 1994.

Over the years, WXRC has tried various rock formats, including Triple-A. At one point, the station emphasized hard rock and heavy metal, branding itself as "The Panther" starting April 21, 1995. The Carolina Panthers, Charlotte's NFL team, subsequently sued the station. The switch to the current format was made in 2002.

WXRC was the Charlotte affiliate for The Howard Stern Show from April 15, 1997, to 2001. It climbed as high as second in the Charlotte ratings until dropping Stern for Lex and Terry in 2001. Throughout many changes musically, its playlist today consists mostly of artists from the "classic rock" era including the 1960s, 1970s, 1980s, and 1990s.

One of the few independently owned-and-operated stations in the Charlotte market, its sound is very similar to how most FM stations sounded in the 1970s. Lingafelt has received a number of offers to sell his station over the years. However, he told The Charlotte Observer that he was not willing to sell to anyone, claiming that his station's format would never be possible under a corporate owner. In 2008, the station was rated the 12th most popular station in Charlotte by Arbitron, but was rated second in the critical 25-49 demographic.
