= WNCG-LP =

- Mansfield, Ohio; United States
- Frequency: 95.7 MHz

Programming
- Format: college radio

Ownership
- Owner: North Central State College

Technical information
- Licensing authority: FCC
- Facility ID: 132055
- Class: L1
- ERP: 33 watts
- HAAT: 51.2 meters
- Transmitter coordinates: 40°48′24.00″N 82°35′31.00″W

Links
- Public license information: LMS

WNCG-LP (95.7 FM) is a radio station broadcasting a college radio format. Licensed to Mansfield, Ohio, United States, the station is currently owned by North Central State College.
