= WGAB =

- Newburgh, Indiana; United States
- Broadcast area: Evansville
- Frequency: 1180 kHz
- Branding: Faith Music Radio

Programming
- Format: Christian radio

Ownership
- Owner: Faith Broadcasting, LLC

History
- Former call signs: DWGAB (1990–1990)

Technical information
- Licensing authority: FCC
- Facility ID: 48709
- Class: D
- Power: 670 watts day 1 watts night
- Transmitter coordinates: 37°57′16.2″N 87°25′7.00″W
- Translators: 93.1 MHz (W226CB) - Newburgh, Indiana

Links
- Public license information: Public file; LMS
- Webcast: Listen Live
- Website: www.faithmusicradio.com

WGAB (1180 AM) is a radio station broadcasting a Christian radio format. Licensed to Newburgh, Indiana, United States, the station serves the Evansville area. The station is currently owned by Faith Broadcasting, LLC.

== History ==
On 2005-02-17, WGAB transferred ownership from Newburgh Broadcasting Corporation to Faith Broadcasting International.
