= CKTP-FM =

Radio station in Fredericton, New Brunswick

Coordinates: 45°58′28″N 66°37′52″W

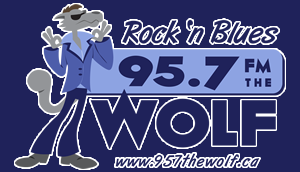
- Fredericton, New Brunswick; Canada
- Broadcast area: Greater Fredericton
- Frequency: 95.7 MHz
- Branding: 95.7 The Wolf

Programming
- Format: Roots Rock/Blues

Ownership
- Owner: Maliseet Nation Radio Inc.

History
- First air date: 2002

Technical information
- Class: LP
- ERP: 50 watts
- HAAT: 1 metre (3 ft 3 in)

Links
- Website: 957thewolf.ca

CKTP-FM is a Canadian radio station in Fredericton, New Brunswick which goes by the name of 95.7 The Wolf. The station broadcasts a mix of roots rock and blues from its studios on the St. Mary's First Nation, at an FM frequency of 95.7 MHz.
