= CHGL-FM =

Coordinates: 54°17′01″N 107°48′04″W

- Green Lake, Saskatchewan; Canada
- Frequency: 94.9 MHz
- Branding: 94.9 FM DA MIX

Programming
- Format: community radio

Ownership
- Owner: Green Lake Communications, Inc.

Technical information
- Class: A1
- ERP: 78 watts horizontal polarization only
- HAAT: −9 meters (−30 ft)

CHGL-FM is a First Nations community radio station that operates at 94.9 FM in Green Lake, Saskatchewan, Canada.

It received a license in December 1975 and first went on air on January 10, 1977. The station is owned by the Green Lake Radio and Television Broadcasting Society.
