= WZLP-LP =

- Loudonville, Ohio; United States
- Frequency: 95.7 MHz
- Branding: WZLP-LP 95.7 FM

Programming
- Format: Religious
- Affiliations: Moody Radio; Salem Radio Network

Ownership
- Owner: Zion Evangelical Lutheran Church

Technical information
- Licensing authority: FCC
- Facility ID: 131748
- Class: L1
- ERP: 100 watts
- HAAT: −4 meters (−13 ft)
- Transmitter coordinates: 40°37′56″N 82°14′51″W

Links
- Public license information: LMS
- Webcast: Listen live
- Website: wzlpradio.com/wzlp/Home.html

WZLP-LP (95.7 FM) is a radio station licensed to serve the community of Loudonville, Ohio. The station is owned by Zion Evangelical Lutheran Church. It airs a religious format.

The station was assigned the WZLP-LP call letters by the Federal Communications Commission on January 29, 2003.

WZLP is the callsign of the fictional radio station in the 1986 horror film "Trick or Treat" Trick or Treat (1986 film)
