= XHLBC-FM =

Radio station in Loreto, Baja California Sur, Mexico

XHLBC-FM/XELBC-AM
- Loreto, Baja California Sur; Mexico
- Frequencies: 95.7 FM; 730 AM
- Branding: Radio La Giganta

Ownership
- Owner: Roberto Loreto Cota Araiza

History
- First air date: May 8, 1995 (concession)
- Call sign meaning: Loreto BCS

Technical information
- Licensing authority: CRT
- Class: B1 (FM); B (AM)
- Power: 10.000 Watts
- ERP: 25 kW
- HAAT: −40.9 m (−134 ft)
- Transmitter coordinates: 26°00′23″N 111°22′42″W

Links
- Webcast: Listen live
- Website: radiolagiganta.com

XHLBC-FM/XELBC-AM is a radio station on 95.7 FM and 730 AM in Loreto, Baja California Sur, Mexico. The station is branded as Radio La Giganta.

== History ==
XELBC-AM 730 received its concession on May 8, 1995. It was a 10 kW daytimer.

XELBC was authorized to move to FM in 2011.
