= XHANS-FM =

Radio tation in Bahía Asunción, Baja California Sur

- Bahía Asunción, Baja California Sur; Mexico
- Frequency: 92.5 FM

Ownership
- Owner: Humberto Espinoza Piedrín

History
- First air date: February 26, 1996 (concession)
- Call sign meaning: AsuNción BCS

Technical information
- Licensing authority: CRT
- Class: A
- ERP: 1.712 kW
- HAAT: 58.9 m (193 ft)

XHANS-FM is a radio station on 92.5 FM in Bahía Asunción, Baja California Sur.

== History ==
XHANS received its concession on February 26, 1996.
