= WRLE-LP =

- Dunnellon, Florida; United States
- Broadcast area: Dunnellon, Romeo, Morriston, Rainbow Lakes
- Frequency: 94.9 MHz
- Branding: Old School that Jams

Programming
- Format: Urban Old School

Ownership
- Owner: Power Ministries

History
- First air date: 2004
- Call sign meaning: Welcome Rainbow Lakes Estates

Technical information
- Licensing authority: FCC
- Facility ID: 133335
- Class: L1
- ERP: 72 watts
- HAAT: 35 meters (115 ft)
- Transmitter coordinates: 29°8′58.00″N 82°30′25.00″W

Links
- Public license information: LMS
- Webcast: https://wrle949.wixsite.com/website

WRLE-LP (94.9 FM, "Old School that Jams) is a radio station broadcasting an Old School music format. Licensed to Dunnellon, Florida, United States, the station is currently owned by Power Ministries.

== History ==
The Federal Communications Commission issued a construction permit for the station on May 28, 2002. The station was issued the WRLE-LP call sign on June 5, 2002, and received its license to cover on February 3, 2004.

WRLE-LP began regular broadcasts in 2002 after longtime area broadcaster Tony Downes received a construction permit for the new low-power FM station. Downes wanted a community outreach radio station primarily to serve the residents of Rainbow Lakes Estate near Dunnellon in West Marion County. The call letters, WRLE, stand for Rainbow Lakes Estates. In 2002, WRLE went on the air. The original format was a CHR format, known as "The Heat". It formerly broadcasts Casey Kasem's American Top 40 on the weekends. However, since most of the residents living within the WRLE listening area are over 45, in 2019 WRLE switch to a format of Old School that Jams. According to Downes, this brought the station's programming more in tune with the station's desired target audience which has a median age of 45. The strategy has worked. WRLE is well received by the area residents and enjoyed by many.

High school sports is another big part of WRLE's success. Each Friday evening during the football season, Dunnellon's Tiger football can be heard live over WRLE with Downes calling the play-by-play action. No other radio station in the area carries any local sports.
