= XHTEC-FM =

Radio station in Monterrey, Nuevo León

- Monterrey, Nuevo León; Mexico
- Frequency: 94.9 MHz
- Branding: Tec Sounds Radio

Programming
- Format: University radio

Ownership
- Owner: Instituto Tecnológico y de Estudios Superiores de Monterrey

History
- First air date: 1998
- Former call signs: XHITE-FM (1998–2000)
- Call sign meaning: TEC de Monterrey

Technical information
- Licensing authority: CRT
- Class: B1
- ERP: 20 kW
- HAAT: −135 m (−443 ft)
- Transmitter coordinates: 25°39′11″N 100°17′17.2″W

Links
- Website: tecsoundsradio.tec.mx/es/

XHTEC-FM is a radio station serving Monterrey, Nuevo León. Mexico. Branded as Tec Sounds Radio, it is owned by the Monterrey Institute of Technology and Higher Education and broadcasts on 94.9 FM from its Monterrey campus.
