= WTGY =

Radio station in Charleston, Mississippi

Coordinates: 33.891222°N 90.052583°W

- Charleston, Mississippi; United States
- Frequency: 95.7 MHz
- Branding: SonLife Radio

Programming
- Format: Christian Radio
- Affiliations: SonLife Broadcasting Network

Ownership
- Owner: Family Worship Center Church, Inc.

History
- First air date: April 1, 1986

Technical information
- Licensing authority: FCC
- Facility ID: 10579
- Class: A
- ERP: 6,000 watts
- HAAT: 100 meters (330 ft)

Links
- Public license information: Public file; LMS
- Webcast: Listen Live
- Website: https://sonlifetv.com/

WTGY (95.7 MHz) is a Christian radio station licensed to Charleston, Mississippi and owned by Family Worship Center Church, Inc. The station began broadcasting on April 1, 1986, and was owned by Superior Broadcast Group. It initially aired a full-service format, featuring country music, and began airing southern gospel music in the 1990s. In 2002, the station was sold to Family Worship Center Church for $300,000.
