= WPCA-LP =

- Amery, Wisconsin; United States
- Broadcast area: Amery, Wisconsin
- Frequency: 93.1 MHz
- Branding: WPCA Radio

Programming
- Format: Adult Standards; Middle of the Road; Jazz
- Affiliations: Salem Radio Network

Ownership
- Owner: Dream Center, Inc.

History
- First air date: July 14, 2003
- Call sign meaning: Wisconsin, Polk County, Amery

Technical information
- Licensing authority: FCC
- Facility ID: 131741
- Class: L1
- ERP: 50 watts
- HAAT: 42 meters (138 ft)
- Transmitter coordinates: 45°19′2.0″N 92°20′27.0″W

Links
- Public license information: LMS
- Webcast: Listen live
- Website: wpcaradio.org

WPCA-LP is an Adult Standards, Middle of the Road, and Jazz formatted broadcast radio station licensed to and serving Amery, Wisconsin. WPCA-LP is owned and operated by Dream Center, Inc.
