= KWYK-FM =

- Aztec, New Mexico; United States
- Broadcast area: Farmington, New Mexico
- Frequency: 94.9 MHz
- Branding: 94.9 FM KWYK

Programming
- Format: Adult contemporary

Ownership
- Owner: Basin Broadcasting Company

History
- First air date: January 2, 1978

Technical information
- Licensing authority: FCC
- Facility ID: 4039
- Class: C1
- ERP: 100,000 watts
- HAAT: 132 meters
- Transmitter coordinates: 36°41′54″N 108°13′18″W

Links
- Public license information: Public file; LMS
- Webcast: Listen live
- Website: kwykradio.com

KWYK-FM (94.9 FM) is a radio station broadcasting adult contemporary music. Licensed to Aztec, New Mexico, the station is owned by Basin Broadcasting Company.
