= XHBAC-FM =

Radio station in Bahía Asunción, Baja California Sur

- Bahía Asunción, Baja California Sur; Mexico
- Frequency: 95.7 FM

Ownership
- Owner: Bertha Josefa Cesaria Cota Águilar

History
- First air date: May 8, 1995 (concession)
- Call sign meaning: Bahia AsunCión

Technical information
- Licensing authority: CRT
- Class: B1
- ERP: 25 kW
- HAAT: 56.3 m (185 ft)
- Transmitter coordinates: 27°08′13.5″N 114°18′00.5″W

XHBAC-FM is a radio station on 95.7 FM in Bahía Asunción, Baja California Sur.

== History ==
XEBAC-AM 1100 received its concession on May 8, 1995. It migrated to FM in 2011.
