= WLPM-LP =

- Christmas, Florida; United States
- Frequency: 95.7 MHz

Ownership
- Owner: Orange Blossom Community Media Association

Technical information
- Licensing authority: FCC
- Facility ID: 135433
- Class: L1
- ERP: 100 watts
- HAAT: 28.0 meters (91.9 ft)
- Transmitter coordinates: 28°32′18.00″N 81°07′52.23″W

Links
- Public license information: LMS

WLPM-LP (95.7 FM) is a radio station licensed to Christmas, Florida, United States. The station is currently owned by Orange Blossom Community Media Association.
