= XHRLA-FM =

Radio station in Santa Rosalía, Baja California Sur

- Santa Rosalía, Baja California Sur; Mexico
- Broadcast area: Santa Rosalía, Baja California Sur
- Frequency: 95.7 FM
- Branding: Radio Santa Rosalía

Ownership
- Owner: Antonio Rigoberto Espinoza Piedrín

History
- First air date: February 26, 1996 (concession)
- Call sign meaning: Santa RosaLíA

Technical information
- Licensing authority: CRT
- Class: B1
- ERP: 25 kW
- HAAT: −21.1 m (−69 ft)
- Transmitter coordinates: 27°20′00″N 112°16′13″W

XHRLA-FM is a radio station on 95.7 FM in Santa Rosalía, Baja California Sur. The station is branded as Radio La Giganta.

== History ==
XERLA-AM 930, later 940, received its concession on May 8, 1995. It was a 1 kW daytimer.

XERLA was authorized to move to FM in 2011.
