= XHUDC-FM =

Radio station of the Universidad de Colima

- Colima, Colima, Mexico; Mexico
- Frequency: 94.9 MHz
- Branding: Universo FM

Programming
- Format: Mexican college

Ownership
- Owner: Universidad de Colima

History
- First air date: 2002
- Former call signs: XHELT-FM (never used on air)
- Call sign meaning: Universidad de Colima

Technical information
- ERP: 3 kW

Links
- Website: www.ucol.mx/radio/

XHUDC-FM is a Mexican college radio station owned by the Universidad de Colima. It is known as Universo FM and broadcasts on 94.9 MHz.

== History ==
XHUDC signed on the air in 2002 after receiving its permit in 2000. The university had initially attempted to get a radio station in the 1980s, but transmitter problems and turbulence at other university radio stations caused the permit to be canceled.

The station took to the air with music and a test signal in the spring of 2002. Full programming commenced on June 1, and the station quickly found itself useful after a 7.6 magnitude earthquake struck the state in October 2002. XHUDC was the first station back on air, as it still had power, and was thus the only station available for a time.
