= KSEC =

Radio station in Boneville, Arkansas, United States

KSEC-FM
- Bentonville, Arkansas; United States
- Broadcast area: Fayetteville, Arkansas Northwest Arkansas
- Frequency: 95.7 MHz

Programming
- Format: Mexican Regional

Ownership
- Owner: La Zeta 95.7 Inc. (Eddie Vega)

Technical information
- Licensing authority: FCC
- Facility ID: 34795
- Class: A
- ERP: 6,000 watts
- HAAT: 100 meters
- Transmitter coordinates: 36°17′54″N 94°10′21″W

Links
- Public license information: Public file; LMS
- Webcast: KSEC webcast
- Website: ezspanishmedia.com

KSEC-FM (95.7 FM) La Zeta 95.7 FM is the only full size Spanish radio station broadcasting a Mexican Regional format. Licensed to Bentonville, Arkansas, United States, it serves the Fayetteville - Springdale - Rogers (Northwest Arkansas) area. The station is currently owned by La Zeta 95.7 Inc, and has been in the area since 1994.
