= WRXA-LP =

- Rocky Mount, Virginia; United States
- Broadcast area: Metro Rocky Mount
- Frequency: 95.7 MHz

Programming
- Format: Variety

Ownership
- Owner: Rocky Mount Community Radio

History
- First air date: 2017
- Former call signs: WZNR-LP (2014–2015)

Technical information
- Licensing authority: FCC
- Facility ID: 196071
- Class: L1
- Power: 100 watts
- HAAT: −10.9 meters (−36 ft)
- Transmitter coordinates: 36°59′42.10″N 79°53′59.30″W

Links
- Public license information: LMS

WRXA-LP is a Variety formatted broadcast radio station. The station is licensed to and serving Rocky Mount in Virginia. WRXA-LP is owned and operated by Rocky Mount Community Radio.
