= KXTT =

Radio station in Maricopa, California

- Maricopa, California; United States
- Broadcast area: Bakersfield, California
- Frequency: 94.9 MHz
- Branding: La Mejor 94.9

Programming
- Format: Spanish oldies and ranchera music

Ownership
- Owner: Lazer Media; (Lazer Licenses, LLC)

History
- First air date: 2009

Technical information
- Licensing authority: FCC
- Facility ID: 164119
- Class: A
- ERP: 6,000 watts
- HAAT: 95 meters (312 ft)
- Transmitter coordinates: 35°5′39″N 119°27′40″W

Links
- Public license information: Public file; LMS
- Webcast: Listen live
- Website: radiolazer.com/Mejornet/bakersfield

KXTT (94.9 FM) is a radio station licensed to Maricopa, California, United States, and serves the Bakersfield area. The station is owned by Lazer Media and airs a Spanish oldies and Ranchera format.
