= WXRJ-LP =

- Bloomington, Illinois; United States
- Broadcast area: Bloomington
- Frequency: 94.9 MHz
- Branding: Real Radio

Programming
- Format: Urban Adult Contemporary

Ownership
- Owner: Black Business Alliance, Inc.

Technical information
- Licensing authority: FCC
- Facility ID: 126570
- Class: L1
- ERP: 79 watts
- HAAT: 33.6 meters (110 ft)
- Transmitter coordinates: 40°30′2.00″N 88°55′43.00″W

Links
- Public license information: LMS
- Website: wxrj.org

WXRJ-LP (94.9 FM, "Real Radio") is a radio station broadcasting an urban adult contemporary music format. Licensed to Bloomington, Illinois, United States, the station serves the Bloomington area. The station is currently owned by Black Business Alliance, Inc.
