= WROE-LP =

- Roanoke, Virginia; United States
- Frequency: 95.7 MHz
- Branding: Radio Free Roanoke, 95.7 FM

Programming
- Format: Variety

Ownership
- Owner: Radio Free Roanoke, Inc.

History
- First air date: April 12, 2018

Technical information
- Licensing authority: FCC
- Facility ID: 192071
- Class: LP1
- ERP: 100 watts
- HAAT: −85 metres (−279 ft)
- Transmitter coordinates: 37°15′25.2″N 79°59′23.9″W

Links
- Public license information: LMS
- Website: radiofreeroanoke.org

WROE-LP (95.7 FM, "Radio Free Roanoke, 95.7 FM") is a radio station licensed to serve the community of Roanoke, Virginia. The station is owned by Radio Free Roanoke, Inc., and airs a variety format.

The station was assigned the WROE-LP call letters by the Federal Communications Commission on June 4, 2015.
