= TGN (AM) =

Guatemala City; Guatemala
- Frequency: 730 kHz
- Branding: Radio Cultural TGN

Programming
- Format: religious

Ownership
- Sister stations: TGN-FM, TGNA, TGNC

History
- First air date: August 6, 1950

Technical information
- Facility ID: 99697
- Class: A
- Power: 10,000 watts
- Transmitter coordinates: 14º37'N; 90º33'W

Links
- Website: radio%20cultural%20tgn's%20website

TGN is a class A A.M. radio station operating in Guatemala City, Guatemala. It is the first ever evangelical broadcaster in Guatemala, and has been on the air for more than 60 years. It transmits with a power of 10,000 watts on 730 kHz.
