= XHELPZ-FM =

Radio station in La Paz, Baja California Sur

- La Paz, Baja California Sur; Mexico
- Frequency: 92.7 FM

Programming
- Format: Spanish Music

Ownership
- Owner: Promomedios California; (Mensajes Musicales, S.A.)

History
- First air date: September 30, 1994 (concession)
- Call sign meaning: La Paz

Technical information
- Licensing authority: CRT
- Class: B1
- ERP: 25 kW
- HAAT: 100.1 m (328 ft)
- Transmitter coordinates: 24°07′53″N 110°16′39″W

XHELPZ-FM is a radio station on 92.7 FM in El Centenario, La Paz, Baja California Sur.

== History ==
XHELPZ began in 1994 as XELPZ-AM, broadcasting on 1310 kHz as a daytimer. XELPZ migrated to FM in 2010.
