= WAYB-FM =

- Graysville, Tennessee; United States
- Frequency: 95.7 MHz

Programming
- Format: religious radio

Ownership
- Owner: Family Worship Center Church

History
- Former call signs: WAYB (1989–1992)

Technical information
- Licensing authority: FCC
- Facility ID: 71148
- Class: A
- ERP: 6,000 watts
- HAAT: 100.0 meters
- Transmitter coordinates: 35°24′39.00″N 85°7′54.00″W

Links
- Public license information: Public file; LMS
- Website: http://sonlifetv.com

WAYB-FM (95.7 FM) is a radio station broadcasting a religious radio format. Licensed to Graysville, Tennessee, United States. The station is currently owned by Family Worship Center Church.

== History ==
The station went on the air as WAYB on 30 August 1989. On 4 December 1992, the station changed its call sign to the current WAYB.
