= KLYN =

- Las Vegas, New Mexico; United States
- Frequency: 90.3 MHz

Programming
- Format: Religious radio

Ownership
- Owner: The Rock Christian Outreach

Technical information
- Licensing authority: FCC
- Facility ID: 766737
- Class: A
- ERP: 100 watts
- HAAT: 110 meters (360 ft)
- Transmitter coordinates: 35°36′12.7″N 105°15′32.3″W

Links
- Public license information: Public file; LMS
- Website: KLYN's website

KLYN (90.3 FM) is a radio station broadcasting a Religious radio format. Licensed to Las Vegas, New Mexico, United States. The station is currently owned by The Rock Christian Outreach. Prior to this, the KLYN callsign belonged to Crista Ministries' Praise 106.5 in Lynden, Washington. That station eventually adopted the callsign of KWPZ. In 2024 they switched from 95.7 to 90.3
