= WPLV =

- Navarre, Florida; United States
- Broadcast area: Pensacola metropolitan area
- Frequency: 95.7 MHz
- Branding: K-LOVE

Programming
- Format: Contemporary Christian
- Network: K-LOVE

Ownership
- Owner: Educational Media Foundation

History
- First air date: 1998; 28 years ago
- Former call signs: WAFN (1993–1994); WZEW (1994–1997); WGCX-FM (1997); WGCX (1997–2009); WKFP (2009–2015)
- Call sign meaning: Pensacola K-LOVE

Technical information
- Licensing authority: FCC
- Facility ID: 52024
- Class: C3
- ERP: 25,000 watts
- HAAT: 86 meters (282 ft)
- Transmitter coordinates: 30°27′2.00″N 86°51′59.00″W

Links
- Public license information: Public file; LMS
- Website: www.klove.com

WPLV (95.7 FM) is a non-commercial, listener-supported radio station licensed to Navarre, Florida, and serving the Pensacola metropolitan area.Owned by the Educational Media Foundation (EMF), it airs its national Christian contemporary music network, K-LOVE.

== History ==
The station signed on in 2000 as WGCX with a locally programmed contemporary Christian format. While it was still a construction permit, the station had the call signs WAFN, WZEW, and WGCX-FM.

In October 2013, 550 AM, Inc., sold WKFP to Educational Media Foundation for $1.75 million. The sale was consummated on December 23, 2013, and shortly thereafter, it began carrying the national K-LOVE network.

The station changed its call sign on July 21, 2015, to the current WPLV to represent the words Pensacola and K-Love.
