= WROF-LP =

- Floyd, Virginia; United States
- Frequency: 95.7 MHz
- Branding: WROF 95.7 Radio of Floyd

Programming
- Format: Variety

Ownership
- Owner: Radio Free Floyd

History
- Call sign meaning: W Radio Of Floyd

Technical information
- Licensing authority: FCC
- Facility ID: 197268
- Class: LP1
- ERP: 2 watts
- HAAT: 194 metres (636 ft)
- Transmitter coordinates: 36°55′42.9″N 80°24′58.5″W

Links
- Public license information: LMS
- Webcast: Listen live
- Website: www.wrof-floyd.com

WROF-LP (95.7 FM, "WROF 95.7 Radio of Floyd") is a radio station licensed to serve the community of Floyd, Virginia. The station is owned by Radio Free Floyd and airs a variety format.

The station was assigned the WROF-LP call letters by the Federal Communications Commission on February 10, 2014.
