= XHPLPZ-FM =

Radio station in La Paz, Baja California Sur

- La Paz, Baja California Sur; Mexico
- Frequency: 91.1 FM (HD Radio)
- Branding: Radiante FM

Programming
- Format: Pop/rock

Ownership
- Owner: CPS Media; (Compañía Periodística Sudcalifornia, S.A. de C.V.)
- Sister stations: TV Mar (XHCPBC-TDT 23)

History
- First air date: July 9, 2018
- Call sign meaning: La Paz

Technical information
- Licensing authority: CRT
- Class: B1
- ERP: 13 kW
- HAAT: −16.8 m (−55 ft)
- Transmitter coordinates: 24°09′38″N 110°18′06″W

Links
- Website: lapaz.radiante.fm

XHPLPZ-FM is a radio station on 91.1 FM in La Paz, Baja California Sur, Mexico. It is owned by CPS Media and is known as Radiante FM.

== History ==
XHPLPZ was awarded in the IFT-4 radio auction of 2017 and came to air on July 9, 2018. CPS Media, an arm of Grupo Editorial Tribuna, was formed from the three FM stations won in the IFT-4 auction by Compañía Periodística Sudcaliforniana (La Paz, San José del Cabo and Puerto Vallarta), as well as the three TV transmitters in the same cities that were won in the IFT-6 television station auction.

Attempts by Tribuna to enter broadcasting had stretched back to 1995, when the company made requests for the federal government to make available new commercial radio stations. While these were approved in early 2000, the government of Vicente Fox did not award any of the stations.
