= CHBI-FM =

Community radio station in Burnt Islands, Newfoundland and Labrador

Coordinates: 47°36′18″N 58°52′06″W

- Burnt Islands, Newfoundland and Labrador; Canada
- Frequency: 95.7 MHz
- Branding: Burnt Islands 95.7 FM

Programming
- Format: Community radio

Ownership
- Owner: Burnt Islands Economic Development Board

History
- First air date: 2004

Technical information
- ERP: 50 watts
- HAAT: -9 metres

CHBI-FM is a community radio station that operates at 95.7 MHz (FM) in Burnt Islands, Newfoundland and Labrador, Canada.

Owned by the Burnt Islands Economic Development Board, the station was licensed in 2004.
