= La Radio de Sudcalifornia =

Public radio network of the Mexican state of Baja California Sur

- Baja California Sur; Mexico
- Frequency: 99.1 MHz
- Branding: La Radio de Sudcalifornia

Programming
- Format: Public radio

Ownership
- Owner: Government of the State of Baja California Sur (Instituto Estatal de Radio y Televisión de Baja California Sur)
- Sister stations: XHBZC-TDT

History
- First air date: March 31, 1984

Technical information
- Licensing authority: CRT
- Class: (see table)
- ERP: (see table)
- HAAT: (see table)

Links
- Website: iert.bcs.gob.mx

La Radio de Sudcalifornia is the state radio network of the Mexican state of Baja California Sur. It broadcasts on seven FM transmitters, all on 99.1 MHz in the state with most content originating from the state capital in La Paz. The Los Cabos area has some separate programming.

== History ==
Baja California Sur began statewide radio broadcasts from XEBCS-AM (1050 kHz) on March 31, 1984. In 1996, the station—then known as Radio Cultural—was merged with the recently formed Canal 8 TV station in La Paz to form the Instituto Estatal de Radio y Televisión de Baja California Sur (State Radio and Television Institute of Baja California Sur).

In 2011, the Baja California Sur state government received a series of permits to build FM stations on 99.1 MHz in La Paz, Bahía de Tortugas, Cabo San Lucas, Ciudad Constitución, Guerrero Negro, Loreto, and Santa Rosalía. These were separate from XEBCS-AM, which received approval in 2013 to migrate to the FM band as XHEBCS-FM 99.9. However, the 99.9 facility was never built, with the state network using XEBCS-AM and the 99.1 network.

In 2022, the Los Cabos transmitter began airing some separate programming for southern Baja California Sur.

The XHEBCS-FM facility, though unused, remained authorized. In 2024, the state government announced it would transfer the concession to the Universidad Autónoma de Baja California Sur, owner of XEUBS-AM 1180 in La Paz. The Federal Telecommunications Institute approved the concession transfer on May 7, 2025.

== Transmitters ==
All of the state radio transmitters broadcast on 99.1 MHz.

Transmitters
Call sign	City	ERP
XHBCP-FM	La Paz	4.82 kW
XHHIA-FM	Bahía Tortugas	1.09 kW
XHLUC-FM	Cabo San Lucas	4.82 kW
XHCON-FM	Ciudad Constitución	2.19 kW
XHNEG-FM	Guerrero Negro	1.09 kW
XHLOR-FM	Loreto	1.09 kW
XHSRB-FM	Santa Rosalía	2.19 kW
