= KVPM =

- Arvin, California; United States
- Broadcast area: Bakersfield, California
- Frequency: 95.7 MHz
- Branding: 95.7 KVPM

Programming
- Language: English
- Format: Stunting

Ownership
- Owner: Precious Mayes; (SHEMOGUL Media, LLC)

History
- First air date: November 21, 2015; 10 years ago
- Former call signs: KKCA (2015–2021)

Technical information
- Licensing authority: FCC
- Facility ID: 198792
- Class: A
- ERP: 1,450 watts
- HAAT: 206 meters (676 ft)
- Transmitter coordinates: 35°0′38.2″N 119°0′52.2″W

Links
- Public license information: Public file; LMS
- Webcast: Listen Live
- Website: radioprecious957.com

KVPM (95.7 FM) is a radio station licensed to Arvin, California and serves the Bakersfield area. Its broadcast license is held by SHEMOGUL Media, LLC.

== History ==
This station received its original construction permit from the Federal Communications Commission on November 6, 2015. The new station was assigned the KKCA call sign by the FCC on November 21, 2015. KKCA received its license to cover from the FCC on December 31, 2018. The station had a country format until 2021.

The call letters were changed to KVPM on June 21, 2021, after the station was acquired from Colt Comm, LLC by SHEMOGUL Media, LLC. A previous 2019 sale to American General Media failed to close. After SHEMOGUL Media, LLC was acquired, KVPM switched from country to urban contemporary.
