= KNNA-LP =

- Lincoln, Nebraska; United States
- Frequency: 95.7 MHz
- Branding: KNNA 95.7FM: The Cross

Programming
- Format: Lutheran

Ownership
- Owner: Good Shepherd Community Radio

Technical information
- Licensing authority: FCC
- Facility ID: 195172
- Class: LP1
- ERP: 100 watts
- HAAT: 31 metres (102 ft)
- Transmitter coordinates: 40°45′28″N 96°39′51.1″W

Links
- Public license information: LMS
- Webcast: Listen live
- Website: thecross957.org

KNNA-LP (95.7 FM, "KNNA 95.7FM: The Cross") is a radio station licensed to serve the community of Lincoln, Nebraska. The station is owned by Good Shepherd Community Radio. It airs a Lutheran format.

The station was assigned the KNNA-LP call letters by the Federal Communications Commission on March 14, 2014.
