= XHBTA-FM =

Radio station in Bahía de Tortugas, Baja California Sur

- Bahía de Tortugas, Baja California Sur; Mexico
- Frequency: 92.9 FM

Ownership
- Owner: Promomedios California; (Rodolfo Romeo Hernández y Espinoza)

History
- First air date: February 26, 1996 (concession)
- Call sign meaning: Bahia de TortugAs

Technical information
- Licensing authority: CRT
- Class: A
- ERP: 3 kW
- HAAT: 39.8 m (131 ft)

XHBTA-FM is a radio station on 92.9 FM in Bahía de Tortugas, Baja California Sur.

== History ==
XHBTA received its concession on February 26, 1996.
