= XHBTS-FM =

Radio station in Bahía de Tortugas, Baja California Sur

- Bahía de Tortugas, Baja California Sur; Mexico
- Frequency: 96.5 FM

Ownership
- Owner: Candelario Serna Gurrola

History
- First air date: May 8, 1995 (concession)
- Call sign meaning: Bahia de TortugaS

Technical information
- Licensing authority: CRT
- Class: B1
- ERP: 25 kW
- HAAT: 37.3 m (122 ft)
- Transmitter coordinates: 27°41′56″N 114°53′39″W

XHBTS-FM is a radio station on 96.5 FM in Bahía de Tortugas, Baja California Sur.

== History ==
XEBTS-AM 1310 received its concession on May 8, 1995. It migrated to FM in 2011.
