= XEUBS-AM =

Radio station in La Paz, Baja California Sur

XEUBS
- La Paz, Baja California Sur; Mexico
- Frequency: 1180 AM
- Branding: Radio UABCS

Programming
- Format: University radio

Ownership
- Owner: Universidad Autónoma de Baja California Sur

History
- First air date: February 11, 1994 (permit); May 22, 2007

Technical information
- Licensing authority: CRT
- Class: B
- Power: 10 kWs (daytime only)
- Transmitter coordinates: 24°10′33″N 110°17′10″W

Links
- Website: www.uabcs.mx/radio

XEUBS-AM, known as Radio UABCS, is a radio station in La Paz, Baja California Sur, Mexico. It is owned by the Universidad Autónoma de Baja California Sur.

1180 AM is a United States clear-channel frequency, on which WHAM in Rochester, New York, is the dominant Class A station.

In 2024, the Instituto Estatal de Radio y Televisión de Baja California Sur, an agency of the state government, announced it would transfer an unused concession for XHEBCS-FM 99.9 to the UABCS to bring its programming to the FM band. The Federal Telecommunications Institute approved the concession transfer on May 7, 2025. The university intends to broadcast a separate, 24-hour programming schedule on FM, while XEBCS-AM operates from 8 a.m. to 8 p.m. daily.
