= XHESR-FM =

Radio station in Santa Rosalía, Baja California Sur

- Santa Rosalía, Baja California Sur; Mexico
- Frequency: 91.7 FM

Ownership
- Owner: María Guadalupe Espinoza Piedrín

History
- First air date: February 25, 1980 (concession)
- Call sign meaning: Santa Rosalía

Technical information
- Licensing authority: CRT
- Class: B1
- ERP: 25 kW
- HAAT: −28.9 m (−95 ft)
- Transmitter coordinates: 27°20′00″N 112°16′13″W

XHESR-FM is a radio station on 91.7 FM in Santa Rosalía, Baja California Sur.

== History ==
XESR-AM 1320 received its concession on February 25, 1980. It was owned by Guadalupe Espinoza de Aréchiga and broadcast with 500 watts day and 250 at night. It was authorized to move to FM in December 2011.
