= KCJP-LP =

- El Centro, California; United States
- Frequency: 95.7 MHz
- Branding: Saint John Paul II Catholic Radio

Programming
- Format: Catholic radio

Ownership
- Owner: JP2 Media, Inc.

History
- First air date: May 19, 2014

Technical information
- Licensing authority: FCC
- Facility ID: 192960
- Class: L1
- ERP: 25 watts
- HAAT: 58 meters (190 ft)
- Transmitter coordinates: 32°47′39.20″N 115°33′12.40″W

Links
- Public license information: LMS
- Website: jp2radio.com

KCJP-LP is a low power radio station broadcasting to El Centro, California. It is broadcast on 95.7 FM. Currently, it is a Roman Catholic talk station serving the Imperial Valley in Southern California.

== History ==
KCJP-LP began broadcasting on May 19, 2014.
