= WUMY (AM) =

Radio station in Memphis, Tennessee

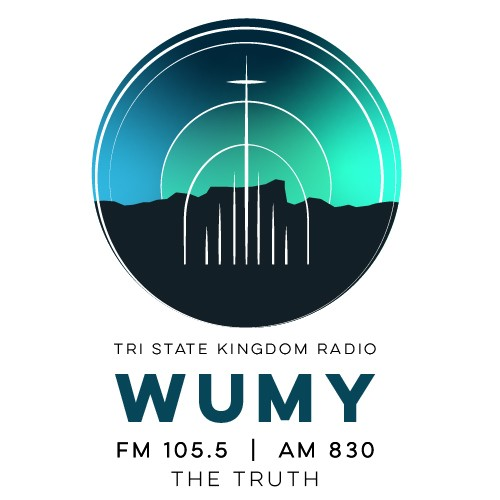
- Memphis, Tennessee; United States
- Broadcast area: Memphis metropolitan area
- Frequency: 830 kHz
- Branding: 105.5FM & 830AM The Truth

Programming
- Format: Christian

Ownership
- Owner: Wilkins Communications Network, Inc.; (WEZMO Broadcasting LLC)

History
- First air date: September 24, 1947
- Former call signs: KBOA (1947–1995); KOTC (1995–2013); WUMY (2013–2014); WGUE (2014–2017)
- Call sign meaning: "Memphis Y 105.5" (former branding for WGUE under country format)

Technical information
- Licensing authority: FCC
- Facility ID: 33672
- Class: D
- Power: 3,000 watts (days only)
- Transmitter coordinates: 35°7′1″N 90°0′59″W
- Translator: 105.5 W288BJ (Memphis)

Links
- Public license information: Public file; LMS
- Webcast: Listen live
- Website: wilkinsradio.com/our-stations/wumy-the-truth

WUMY (830 AM) is a commercial radio station licensed to Memphis, Tennessee, United States, broadcasting a Christian radio format. It is owned by the Ministry Outreach Foundation, through licensee MOF-Christian Media I, LLC, and operates during the daytime hours only.

WUMY is additionally heard around the clock on low-power FM translator W288BJ at 105.5 MHz.

== History ==
On September 24, 1947, the station first signed on the air. It was originally licensed to Kennett, Missouri, and had the call sign KBOA. In 2014, it took the call letters WGUE.

On November 30, 2017, WGUE swapped call letters with sister station WUMY. WGUE is now heard on 1180 AM and WUMY moved to 830 AM.

Effective October 1, 2018, the station was sold to MOF-Christian Media, along with translator 105.5 W288BJ, for $706,823. It adopted a Spanish language Christian format.

On May 31, 2024 MOR-Christian Media sold WUMY and translator 105.5 W288BJ to the Wilkins Radio Network for $460,000. The following day, WUMY dropped its Spanish-language Christian format, changed the station language to English, and adopted a Christian talk and teaching format under the ownership of Wilkins.

== Translator ==
WUMY can also be heard at 105.5 MHz, through an FM translator.

Broadcast translator for WUMY
Call sign	Frequency	City of license	FID	ERP (W)	HAAT	Class	FCC info
W288BJ	105.5 FM	Memphis, Tennessee	140009	250	142.6 m (468 ft)	D	LMS
