= KRAD-LP =

Radio station in Millersburg, Oregon

- Millersburg, Oregon; United States
- Frequency: 94.9 MHz
- Branding: 94.9 KRAD

Programming
- Format: Christian

Ownership
- Owner: Transformation International, Inc.

Technical information
- Licensing authority: FCC
- Facility ID: 135784
- Class: L1
- ERP: 14 watts
- HAAT: 78.8 meters (259 ft)
- Transmitter coordinates: 44°39′03″N 123°00′59″W

Links
- Public license information: LMS

KRAD-LP (94.9 FM, "94.9 KRAD") is a low-power radio station broadcasting a Christian music format. Licensed to Millersburg, Oregon, United States, the station is currently owned by Transformation International, Inc.
