= WGUE (AM) =

Radio station in Turrell, Arkansas, serving Memphis, Tennessee

- Turrell, Arkansas; United States
- Broadcast area: Memphis, Tennessee
- Frequency: 1180 kHz
- Branding: La Jefa 99.3 FM - 1180 AM

Programming
- Format: Regional Mexican

Ownership
- Owner: Butron Media Corporation
- Sister stations: WGSF

History
- First air date: 1987 (as WPLX Collierville, TN, at 1170)
- Former call signs: WWEE (1985–1987); WPLX (1987–2012); KXIQ (2012–2014); WUMY (2014–2017)
- Former frequencies: 1170 kHz (1989–2009)
- Call sign meaning: W-GUEss (former format)

Technical information
- Licensing authority: FCC
- Facility ID: 52906
- Class: D
- Power: 5,000 watts day 3,500 watts critical hours 26 watts night
- Transmitter coordinates: 35°8′31.00″N 90°8′6.00″W
- Translators: 99.3 W257CY (Memphis, Tennessee)

Links
- Public license information: Public file; LMS
- Webcast: Listen Live
- Website: www.lajefa993.com

WGUE (1180 kHz) is a commercial AM radio station in Turrell, Arkansas, serving the Memphis metropolitan area. WGUE is owned by Butron Media Corporation and airs a Regional Mexican radio format. The transmitter is off Legion Road in West Memphis, Arkansas.

WGUE broadcasts with 5,000 watts by day. But because AM 1180 is a clear channel frequency reserved for Class A WHAM in Rochester, New York, WGUE must drastically reduce power at night to 26 watts (during critical hours it operates with 3,500 watts). WGUE programming is also heard in the Memphis area on an FM translator station at 99.3 MHz.

== History ==
In April 1987, the station first signed on as WPLX. It was a 1,000 watt daytimer, broadcasting on 1170 kHz and licensed to Collierville, Tennessee.

On December 15, 2009, the station switched from 1170 to 1180 and moved its city of license to Turrell, Arkansas. In 2012, the call sign became KXIQ.

On January 1, 2014, KXIQ changed format from talk radio to classic country, branded as "Y 105.5" (simulcasting on FM translator W288BJ 105.5 FM), and changed call letters to WUMY on January 15, 2014. On January 24, 2014, WUMY rebranded its station from "Y 105.5" by adding another translator as "Big Country 105.5/100.1".

On November 30, 2017, WUMY swapped call signs with sister station WGUE and took on the "Guess FM" classic hits format that had been on that frequency. While on 1180, Guess FM was associated with three translators, adding W257CY on 99.3 MHz.

On June 15, 2018, Memphis First Ventures filed to sell WGUE and W257CY to Butron Media Corporation for $799,000. Butron Media Corporation is owned by Sergio Butron and Ivette Butron Ramos and also manages the heritage Spanish-language station in Memphis, WGSF "Radio Ambiente", under a time brokerage agreement. Butron also acquired the construction permit for a second translator facility, K268DA on 101.5 MHz; the remaining translators were paired with other stations as part of the sale of the Mighty Media Group cluster. The sale to Butron Media was consummated on August 27, 2018.

In August 2018, Guess FM moved to WOWW 1430 and 97.7, making way for WGUE to be relaunched as La Jefa with a Regional Mexican format.

== FM translator ==
Call sign	Frequency	City of license	FID	ERP (W)	HAAT	Class	Transmitter coordinates	FCC info
K268DA	101.5 FM	Memphis, Tennessee	148303	250	70 m (230 ft)	D	35°8′31.3″N 90°8′6.3″W	LMS
W257CI	99.3 FM	Memphis, Tennessee	149678	99	289.8 m (951 ft)	D	35°9′16.3″N 89°49′20.3″W	LMS

== Former Logo ==
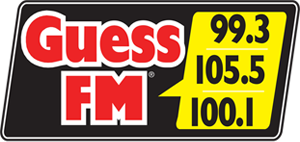
Logo as Guess FM, used from 2017 to 2018
