= Sierra de San Pedro Mártir =

Mountain range in northwestern Mexico

Coordinates: 30°45′N 115°13′W

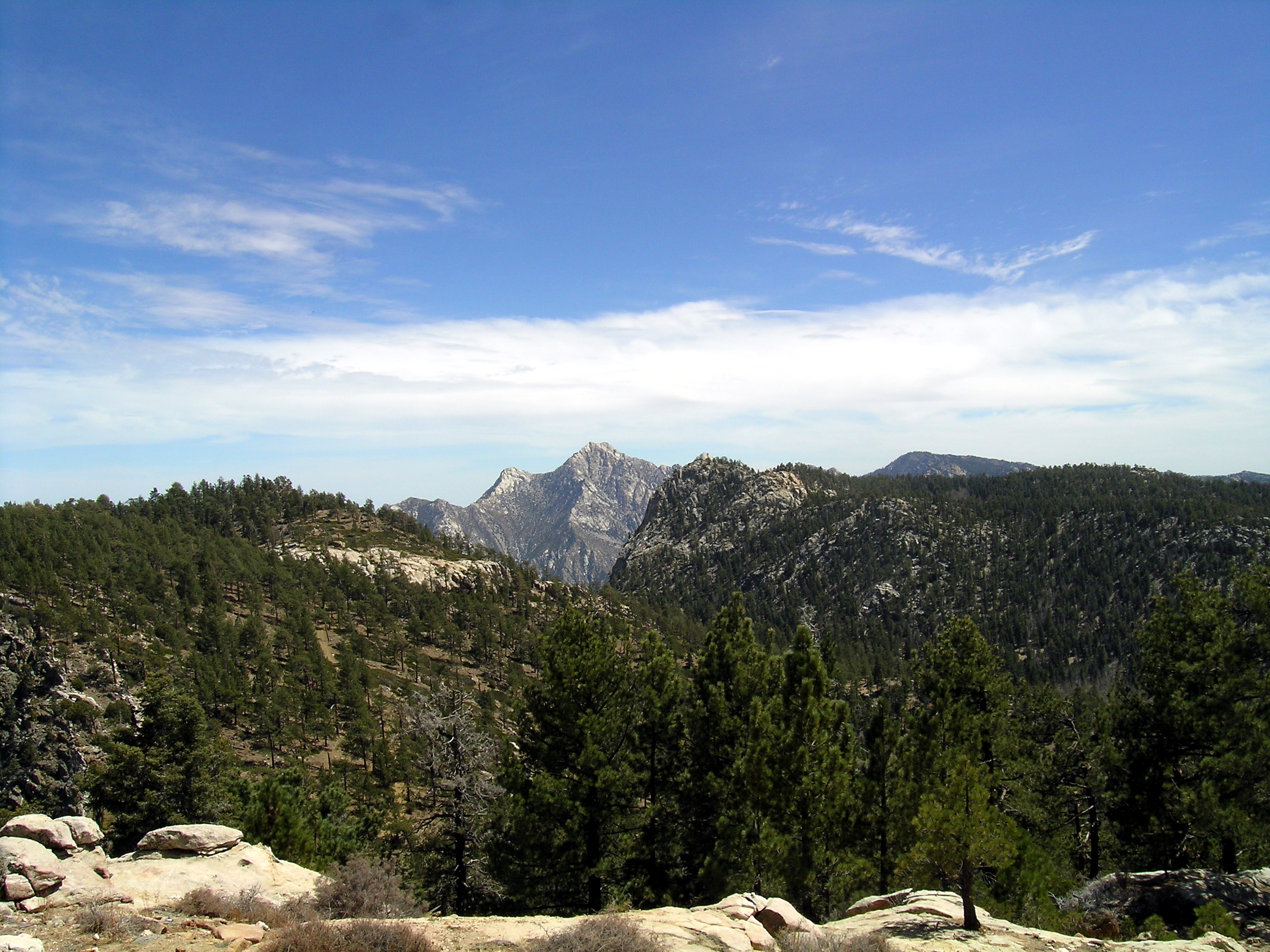
The Sierra de San Pedro Mártir, with Picacho del Diablo (center).

Sierra de San Pedro Mártir (Spanish for 'mountains of Saint Peter the Martyr'; Kiliwa: ʔxaal haq) is a mountain range located within southern Ensenada Municipality and southern Baja California state, of northwestern Mexico.

It is a major mountain range in the long Peninsular Ranges System, that extends from Southern California down the Baja California Peninsula into Baja California Sur state.

== Geography ==
The range's highest peak is Picacho del Diablo at 3,096 m (10,157 ft) in elevation. Also known as Cerro de la Encantada (Enchanted Mountain) and Picacho la Providencia (Providence Peak), it is the highest point in Baja California state and of the entire Baja California Peninsula.

The range is a drainage divide that demarcates the drainages flowing west into the Pacific Ocean or east into the Gulf of California for this section of the Baja California Peninsula. Snow is usually present at the highest elevations in the winter.

The Sierra de Juárez are on the north, and Sierra de San Francisco are on the south, both are also part of the Peninsular Ranges System.

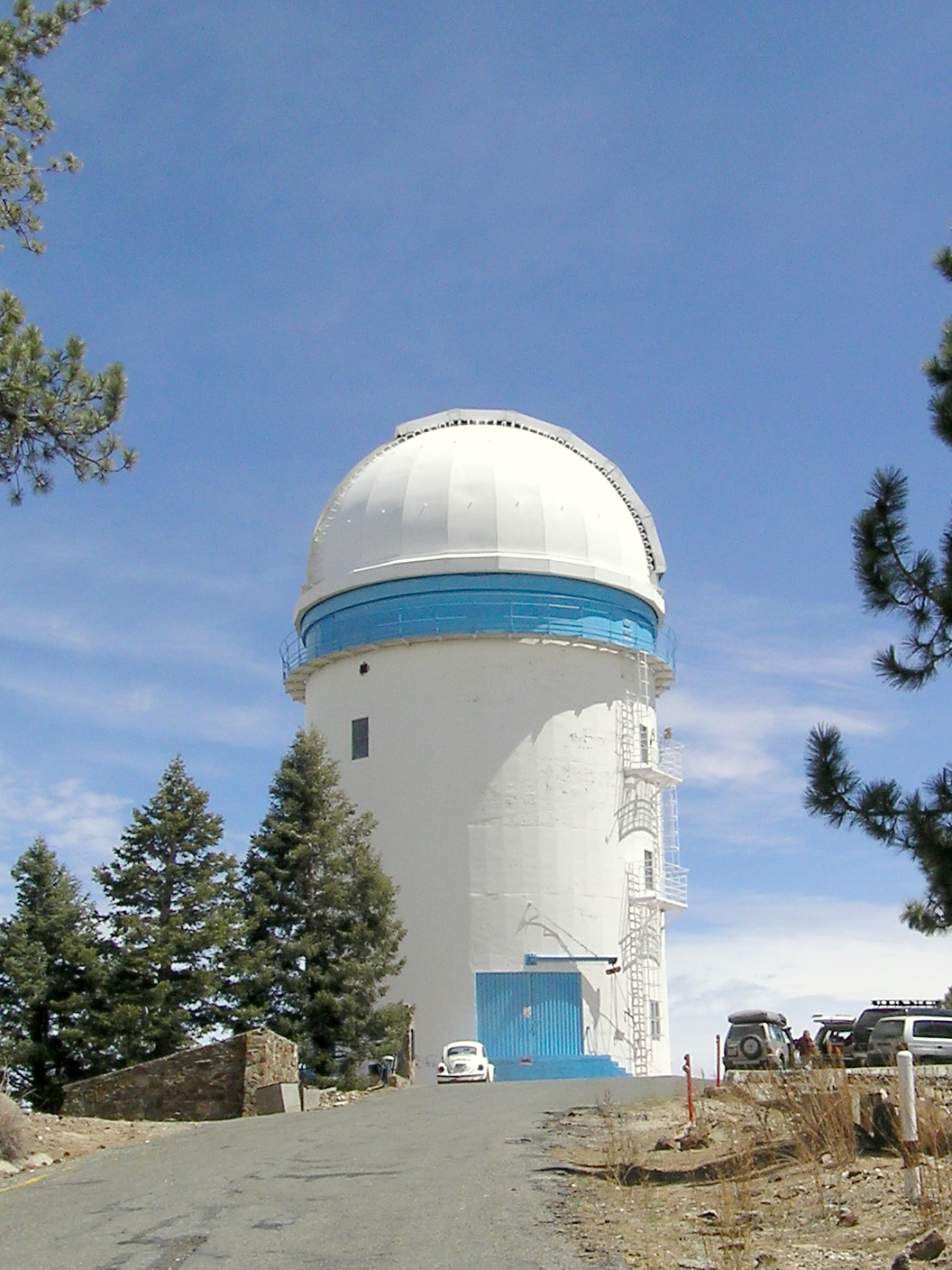
2.12m telescope at National Astronomical Observatory.

=== Features ===
Parque Nacional Sierra de San Pedro Mártir

Parque Nacional Sierra de San Pedro Mártir protects an area of 650 km^{2} (250 sq mi) in the Sierra de San Pedro Mártir. It was established by presidential decree in 1974, and the first of two national parks to be established on the Baja California Peninsula. The second is Parque Nacional Constitución de 1857 to the north, in the Sierra de Juárez and also in Baja California state.

National Astronomical Observatory

The National Astronomical Observatory is located at an elevation of 2,830 m (9,280 ft) in the range. The astronomical complex was built in 1975. It has several large telescopes, the largest of which is 2.12 m (83 in) in diameter. The observatory's site takes advantage of the high elevation, along with typically clear skies, low relative humidity, low atmospheric pollution, low light pollution, and low levels of radio interference.

The range was a site considered for construction of the Thirty Meter Telescope, now tentatively planned for a controversial site on Mauna Kea in Hawaii.

In 1889, there was a gold rush in the Santa Clara mountains about 100 kilometres (60 mi) southeast of Ensenada.

== Ecology ==
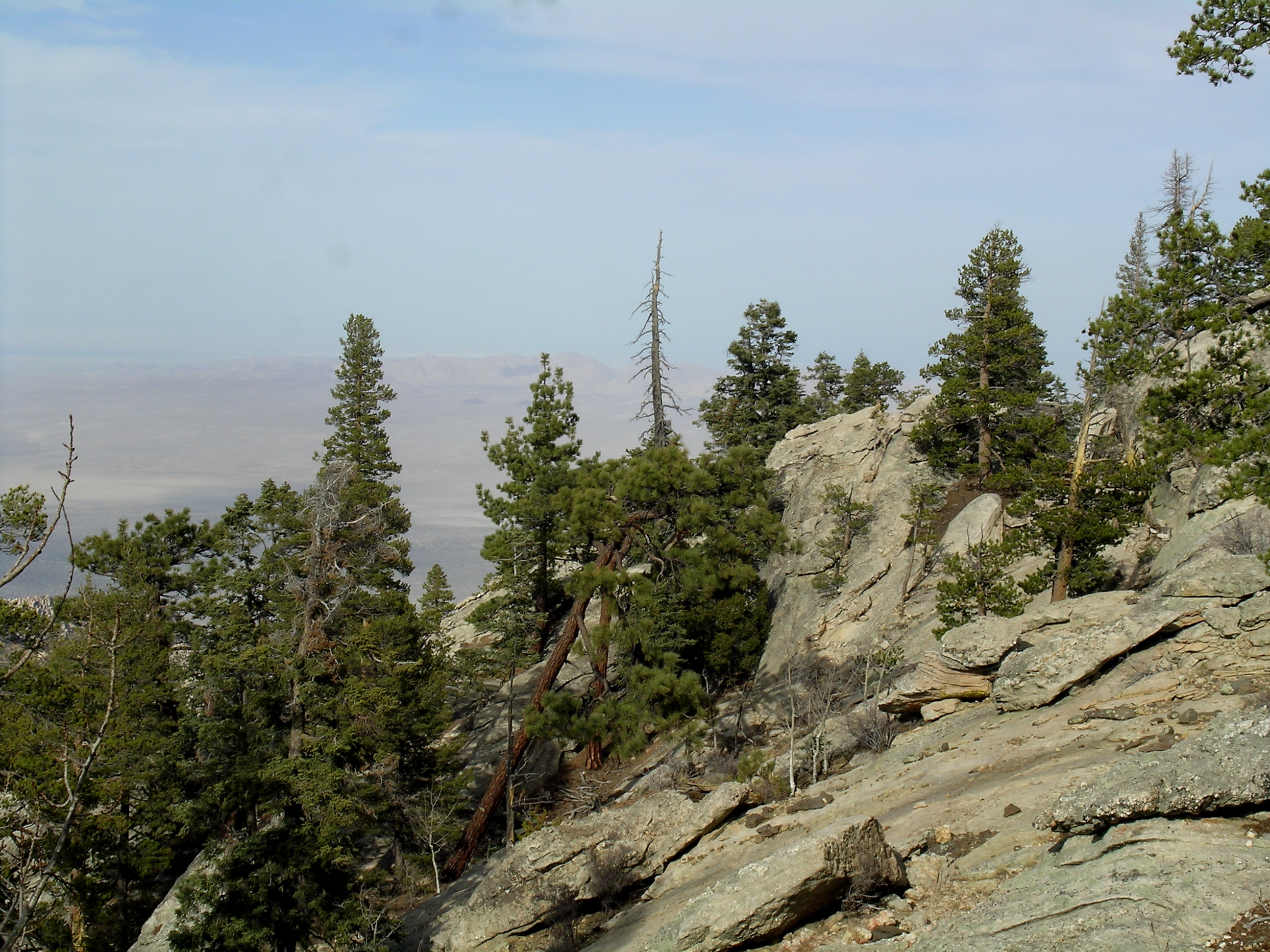
High elevation trees include Pinus jeffreyi, Pinus contorta ssp. murrayana, and Abies concolor subsp. lowiana.

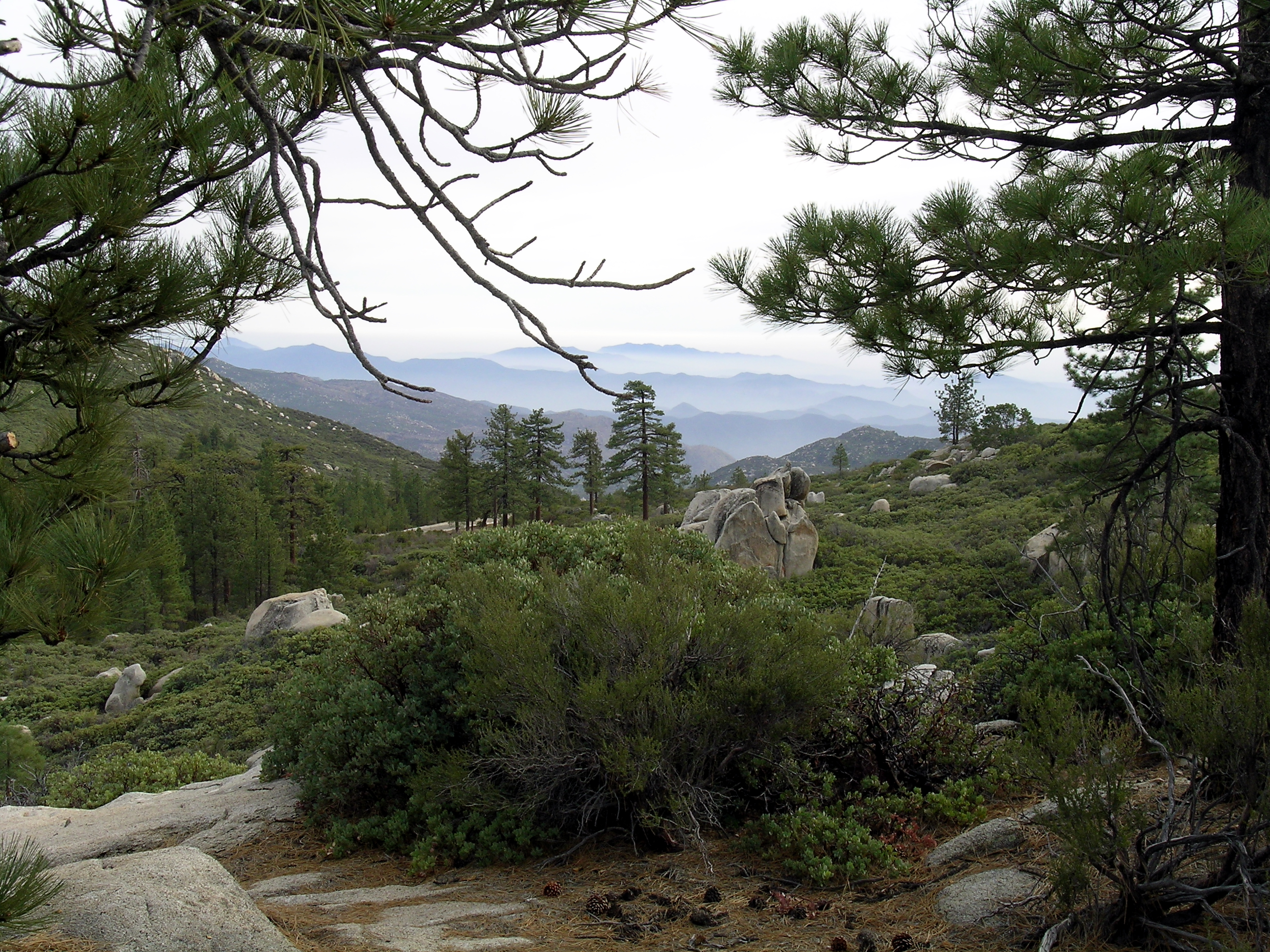
Sierra Juarez and San Pedro Martir pine-oak forests ecoregion flora.

Flora

Sierra de San Pedro Mártir has a very similar flora to the Sierra de Juárez on the north. Higher elevations have Sierra Juarez and San Pedro Martir pine-oak forests ecoregion flora, which are surrounded at lower elevations by California chaparral and woodlands ecoregion flora, and at lowest elevations by the Baja California desert ecoregion flora.

The flora is distinct from that of 'mainland' Mexico across the Gulf of California to the east, and shares many species with the Laguna Mountains and Cuyamaca Mountains, also Peninsular Ranges, in San Diego County, California. Typical conifer species include white fir, sugar pine and Jeffrey pine. The critically endangered San Pedro Mártir cypress (Hesperocyparis montana) is endemic to the Sierra. The canyons of the lower eastern Sierra de Pedro Mártir are the southernmost of natural distribution of the California fan palm (Washingtonia filifera). Native oaks include coast live oak (Quercus agrifolia), canyon live oak (Quercus chrysolepis), Engelmann oak (Quercus engelmannii), and Baja oak (Quercus peninsularis).

Fauna

Baja California rainbow trout (Oncorhynchus mykiss nelsoni) are native to the headwaters of Rio Santo Domingo in the Sierra San Pedro Mártir. Desert bighorn sheep (Ovis canadensis nelsoni) also live in the range.

California condors, zoo-bred from the San Diego Zoo Safari Park condor program, were reintroduced into the Sierra San Pedro Martir in 2002, the first time seen in the range since 1937. Each year, a small group of young California condors are selected from the pool of birds being bred by the Los Angeles Zoo, San Diego Zoo Safari Park, Oregon Zoo, and The Peregrine Fund for release to the wild. Annual releases range from four to seven zoo-bred birds. As of 2022 there were about 40 condors living in the Sierra.

== See also ==
- Flora of Baja California
- Mountain ranges of Baja California
- Peninsular Ranges topics
- Sierra Juarez and San Pedro Martir pine–oak forests ecoregion
