= Sierra de la Giganta =

Mountain range of the Peninsular Ranges in Baja California Sur, Mexico

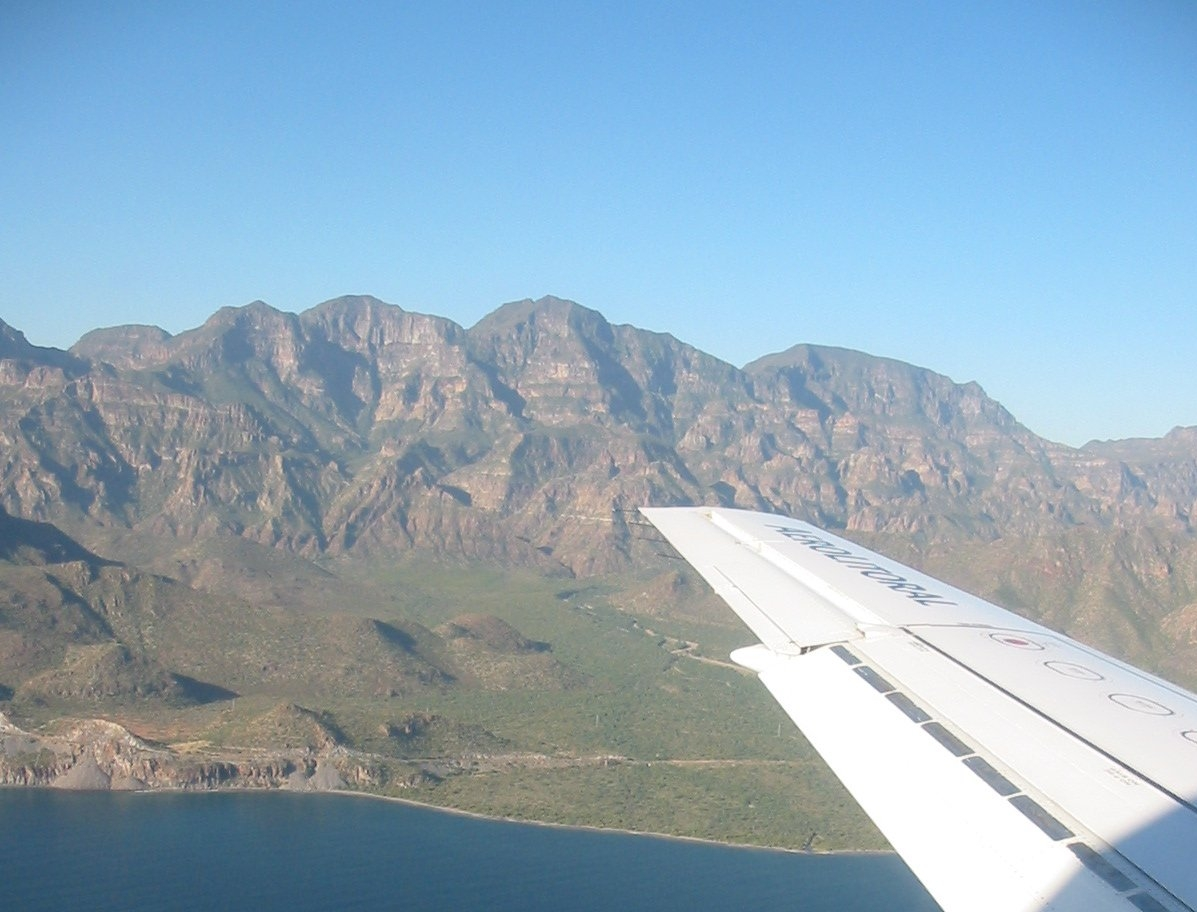
- Eastern face, seen from the Gulf of California

Highest point
- Peak: Cerro de la Giganta
- Elevation: 3,858 ft (1,176 m)
- Prominence: 1,380 m (4,530 ft)

Geography
- Location within Baja California Sur Location within Mexico
- Country: Mexico
- State: Baja California Sur
- Municipality: La Paz Municipality and Loreto Municipality
- Range coordinates: 26°11′N 111°37′W

The Sierra de la Giganta is a mountain range of eastern Baja California Sur state, located on the southern Baja California Peninsula in northwestern Mexico.

It is a mountain range of the Peninsular Ranges System, which extends 1,500 km (930 mi) from Southern California, through the Baja California Peninsula in Baja California and Baja California Sur states.

== Geography ==
The Sierra de la Giganta extends along the southeastern Baja California Peninsula, parallel and close to the coast of the Gulf of California—Sea of Cortez. The highest point is Cerro de la Giganta at 3,858 feet (1,176 m) in elevation, located near Loreto

The range runs from Loreto in Loreto Municipality west of Loreto, southwards to La Paz Municipality northwest of La Paz.

== Ecology ==
The range is predominantly covered in dry (or xeric) shrubland. The Baja California desert ecoregion covers the Pacific (western) slope of the range, and the Gulf of California xeric scrub ecoregion covers the gulf (eastern) slope. Stream valleys with year-round water sustain palm oases, with groves of the native palm Washingtonia robusta and other moisture-loving plants.

== See also ==
- Flora of Baja California Sur
- Peninsular Ranges topics

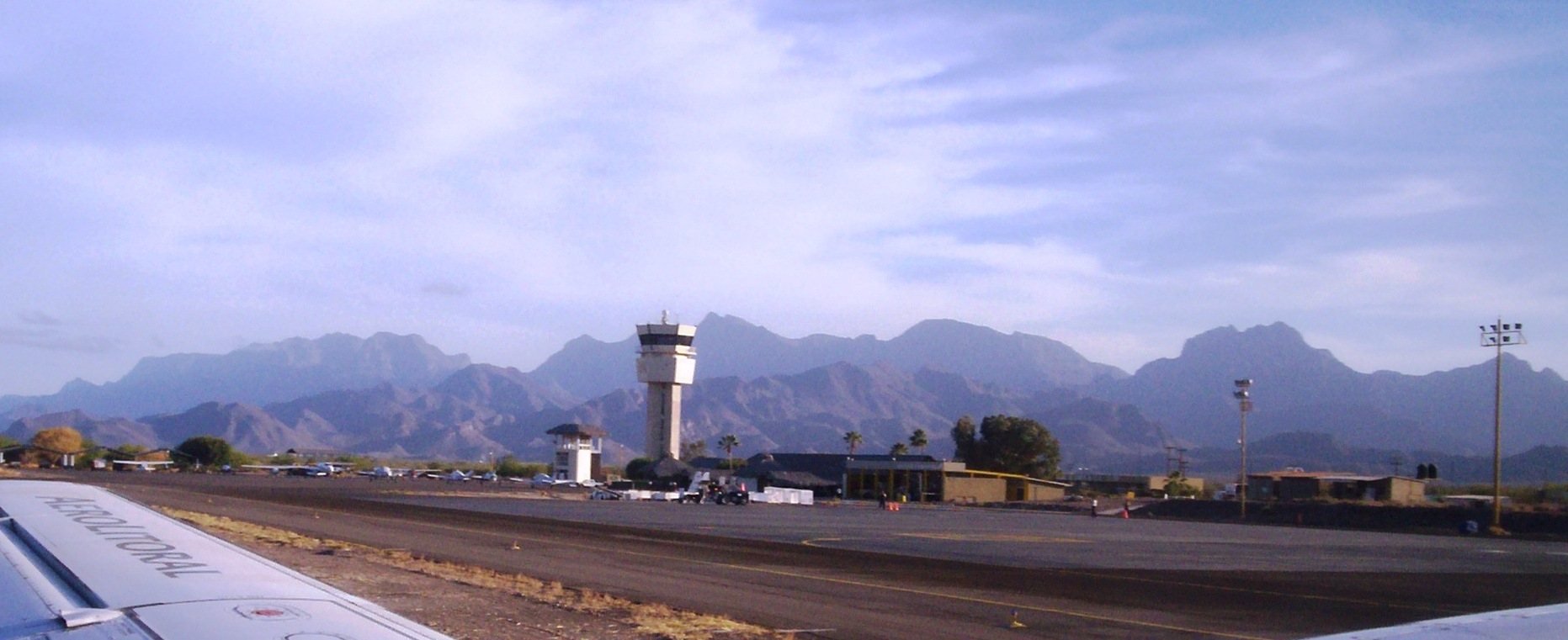
Sierra de la Giganta seen west of the Loreto Airport.
