= Sierra Juárez and San Pedro Mártir pine–oak forests =

Temperate coniferous forests ecoregion in Baja California, Mexico

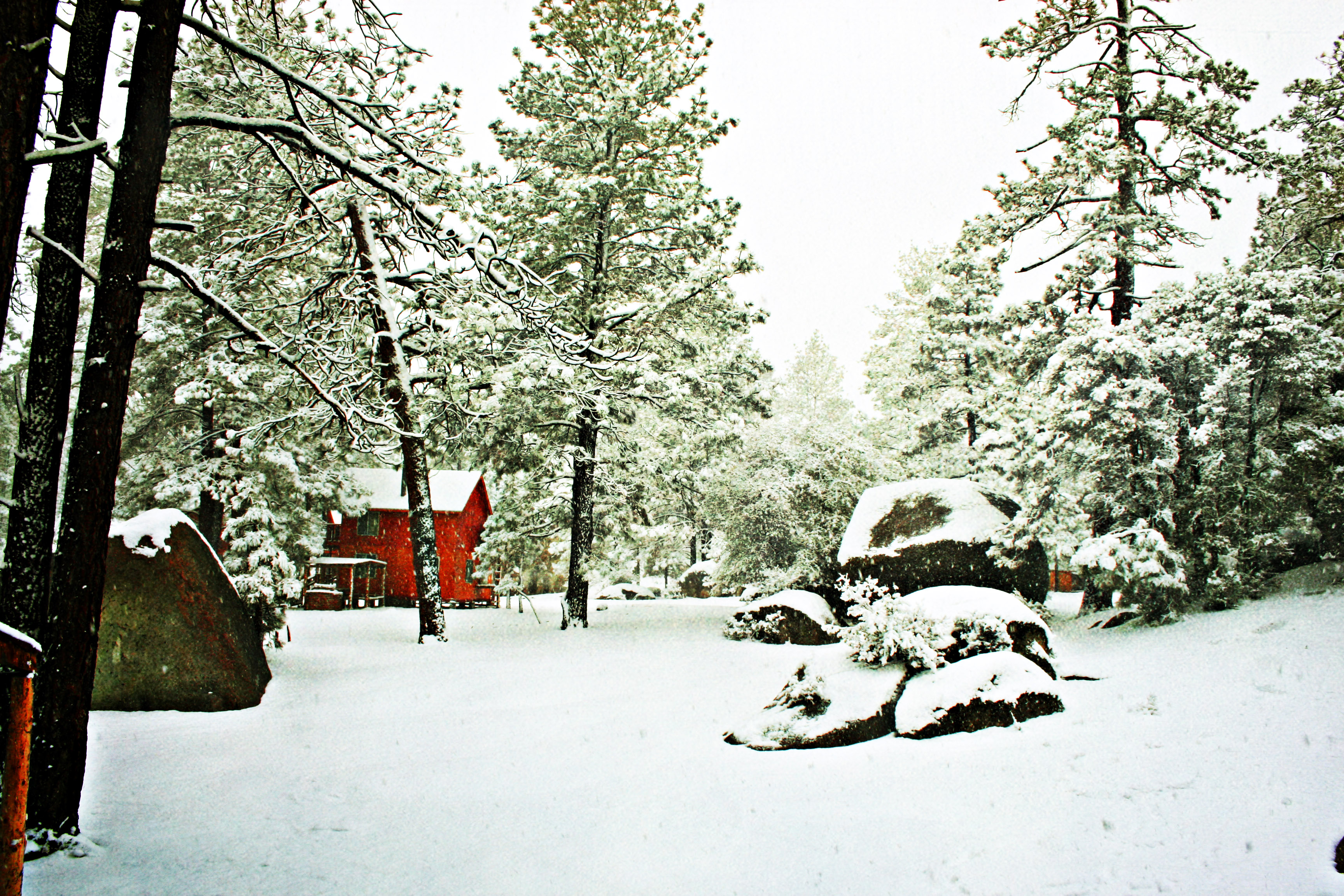

Ecology
- Realm: Nearctic
- Biome: Temperate coniferous forests
- Borders: Baja California desert; California coastal sage and chaparral, Sonoran Desert

Geography
- Area: 4,000 km^{2} (1,500 mi^{2})
- Country: Mexico
- State: Baja California
- Rivers: Tijuana River
- Climate type: Mediterranean (Csa and Csb)

Conservation
- Protected: 16.89%

The Sierra Juárez and San Pedro Mártir pine–oak forests is a Nearctic temperate coniferous forests ecoregion that covers the higher elevations of the Sierra Juárez and Sierra San Pedro Mártir ranges of the Peninsular Ranges, of the northern Baja California Peninsula of Mexico. The pine–oak forests extend throughout the central portion of the Mexican state of Baja California and terminate near the border with the U.S. state of California.

== Setting ==
The pine–oak forests cover an area of 4,000 km^{2} (1,500 sq mi), bounded by the southern extent of the California chaparral and woodlands to the west, by the Baja California desert to the southwest, and by the Sonoran Desert to the east. It lies at the southeastern extent of the Mediterranean climate region that covers much of California and the northwestern corner of Baja California, and the climate is temperate with winter rains. It is one of the southernmost ecoregions of the temperate coniferous forest biome in North America, and the only instance of this biome in Mexico.

== Flora ==
These forests are predominantly pine, juniper, fir, and oak. Ten pine species can be found in the ranges, including tamarack pine (Pinus contorta subsp. murrayana), sugar pine (Pinus lambertiana), Jeffrey pine (Pinus jefferyi), and Parry pinyon (Pinus quadrifolia), along with white fir (Abies concolor subsp. lowiana), and California incense cedar (Calocedrus decurrens). Native oak species include coast live oak (Quercus agrifolia), Engelmann oak (Quercus engelmannii), canyon live oak (Quercus chrysolepis), Baja oak (Quercus peninsularis). There are also several isolated stands of quaking aspen (Populus tremuloides) on the higher slopes.

Tecate cypress (Hesperocyparis forbesii) are found in scattered groves across the range. The critically endangered San Pedro Mártir cypress (Hesperocyparis montana) is endemic to the Sierra San Pedro Mártir, where it grows on slopes and in canyons from 1,900 to 2,520 meters elevation. The Sierra Juárez and San Pedro Mártir pine–oak forests are near the southern limit of the distribution of the California fan palm (Washingtonia filifera). The higher portions of these Peninsular Ranges harbor many rare and endemic species.

About 66 species are endemic to the Sierra San Pedro Martír oak and conifer forests. Endemic and near-endemic species include Amorpha apiculata (Fabaceae), Castilleja ophiocephala (Scrophulariaceae), Dudleya pauciflora (Crassulaceae), Ambrosia flexuosa, Stenotus pulvinatus, Cirsium trachylomum, Stephanomeria monocephala, and Artemisia martirensis (Asteraceae), and Echinocereus pacificus subsp. mombergerianus (Cactaceae).

== Fauna ==
Native mammals include the puma (Puma concolor), desert bighorn sheep (Ovis canadensis nelsoni), mule deer (Odocoileus hemionus fuliginatus), bobcat (Lynx rufus), coyote (Canis latrans), fringed myotis (Myotis thysanodes), California chipmunk (Tamias obscurus), ornate shrew (Sorex ornatus), and western gray squirrel (Sciurus griseus anthonyi). Anthony's Mexican mole (Scapanus anthonyi) is endemic to the ecoregion.

Native birds include the bald eagle (Haliaeetus leucocephalus), California condor (Gymnogyps californianus), pinyon jay (Gymnohinus cyanocephalus), and white-breasted nuthatch (Sitta carolinensis). California condors were extirpated from the mountains by the 1930s. Condors were reintroduced to the ecoregion in 2002, and by 2022 numbered about 40 individuals.

== Conservation ==
16.89% of the ecoregion is in protected areas. They include Constitución de 1857 National Park and Sierra de San Pedro Mártir National Park. Laguna Hanson in Constitución de 1857 National Park is designated a Ramsar site (wetland of international importance).

== See also ==
- List of ecoregions in Mexico
