= Asbestos Mountain (Riverside County, California) =

Mountain summit in Riverside County, California

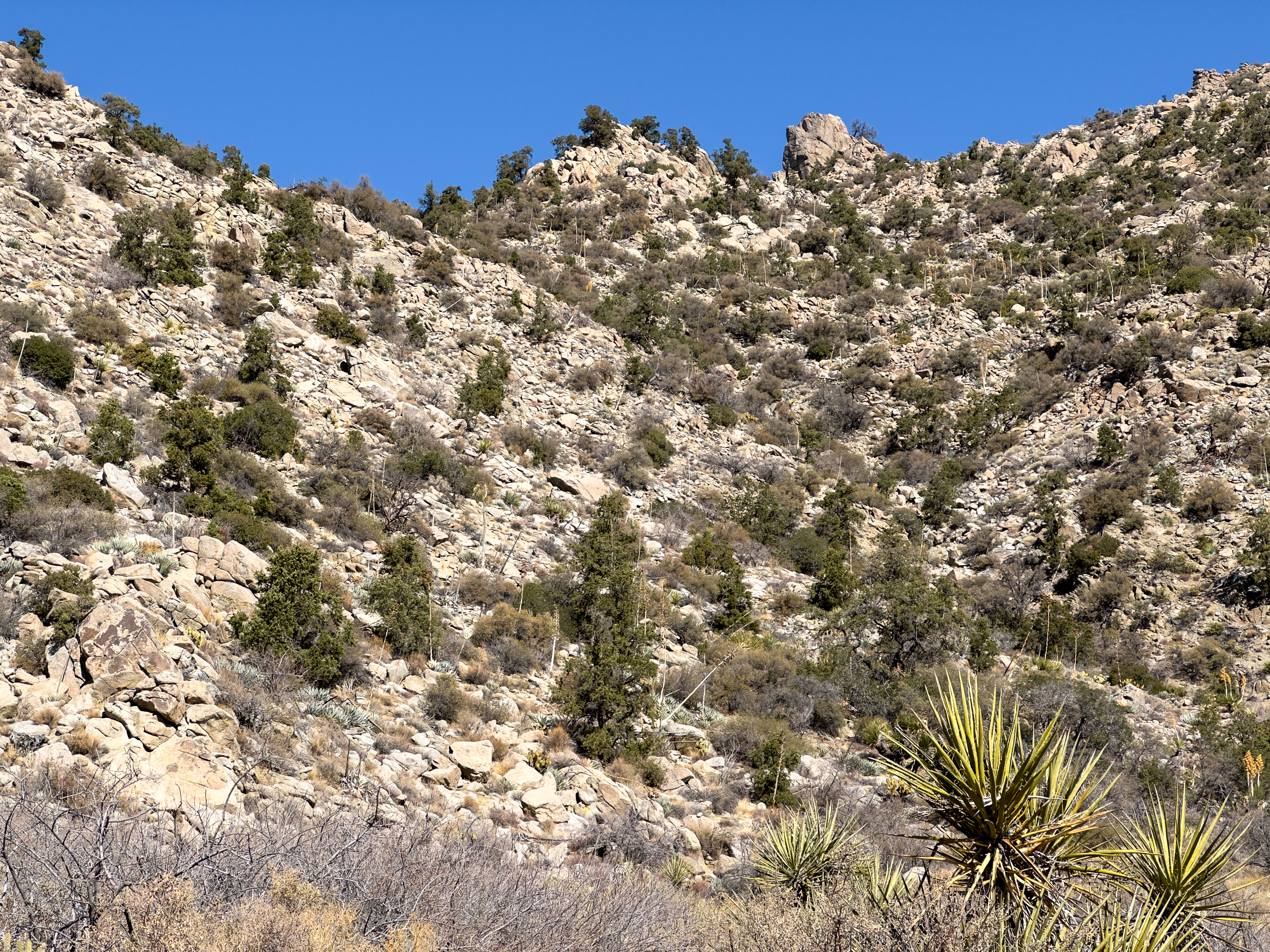
- A view of Asbestos Mountain from the south

Highest point
- Elevation: 5,246 ft (1,599 m)

Geography
- Location within California
- Country: United States
- State: California
- County: Riverside County
- Range coordinates: 33°37′39.46″N 116°27′32.63″W
- Parent range: Peninsular Ranges

Asbestos Mountain is a mountain summit in Riverside County, California.

== History ==
Mines at the base of Asbestos Mountain were an early source of asbestos in California. When the toxic properties of asbestos were understood, and the use of the material phased out, the mines were buried.

== See also ==
- Mountains of Riverside County, California
