= Hollywood fault =

Active fault along the northern edge of the Los Angeles Basin

Coordinates: 34.103°N 118.326°W

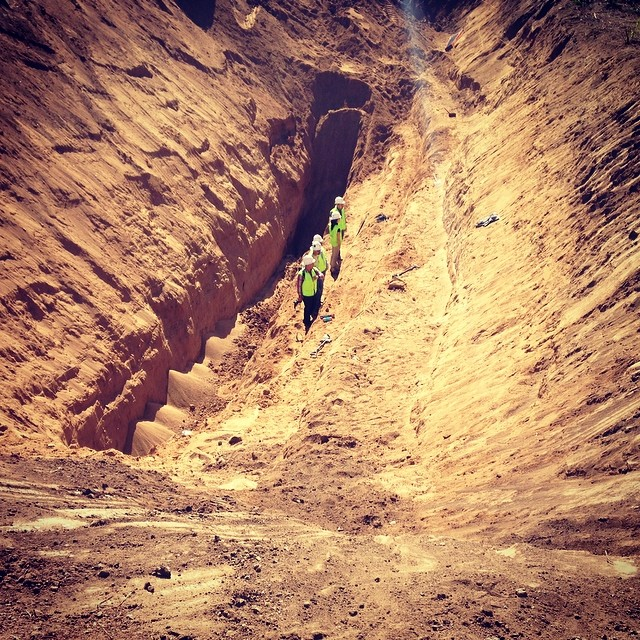
A giant trench created next to the Capitol Records building in 2014 to determine the exact location of the Hollywood fault.

The Hollywood fault is an active fault of approximately 9 miles (14 km) in length located along the northern edge of the Los Angeles Basin. It is part of a system of seismically active folds and faults that constitute the complex transition zone between the Transverse and Peninsular Ranges. The Malibu Coast—Santa Monica—Hollywood fault system is the result of transtension and transpression associated with rotation of the Transverse Ranges in the Cenozoic Era. It has an established dip angle of between 70° and 90° based on surface and subsurface observations, and has experienced significant left-slip movement since the late Miocene. Its minimum and maximum dip-slip displacement rates are estimated at 0.3 mm and 0.5 mm per year, with a strike-slip displacement rate of 0.3–0.6 mm per year which together suggest an annual oblique slip rate of between 0.5 mm and 0.6 mm.

Although it has never produced a significant earthquake in recorded history, if the fault eventually ruptures by itself its size and geology could produce a quake with a magnitude of between 5.8 and 6.5 every 1,600 years or so. However, if the Hollywood fault is, in fact, a continuation of the somewhat larger nearby Raymond Fault, the combined strength of a rupture along both faults could produce a quake with a magnitude of as much as 7.0, though such an event would likely happen only once every 3,000 to 5,000 years.
