= Sonoran Desert =

Desert in Mexico and the United States

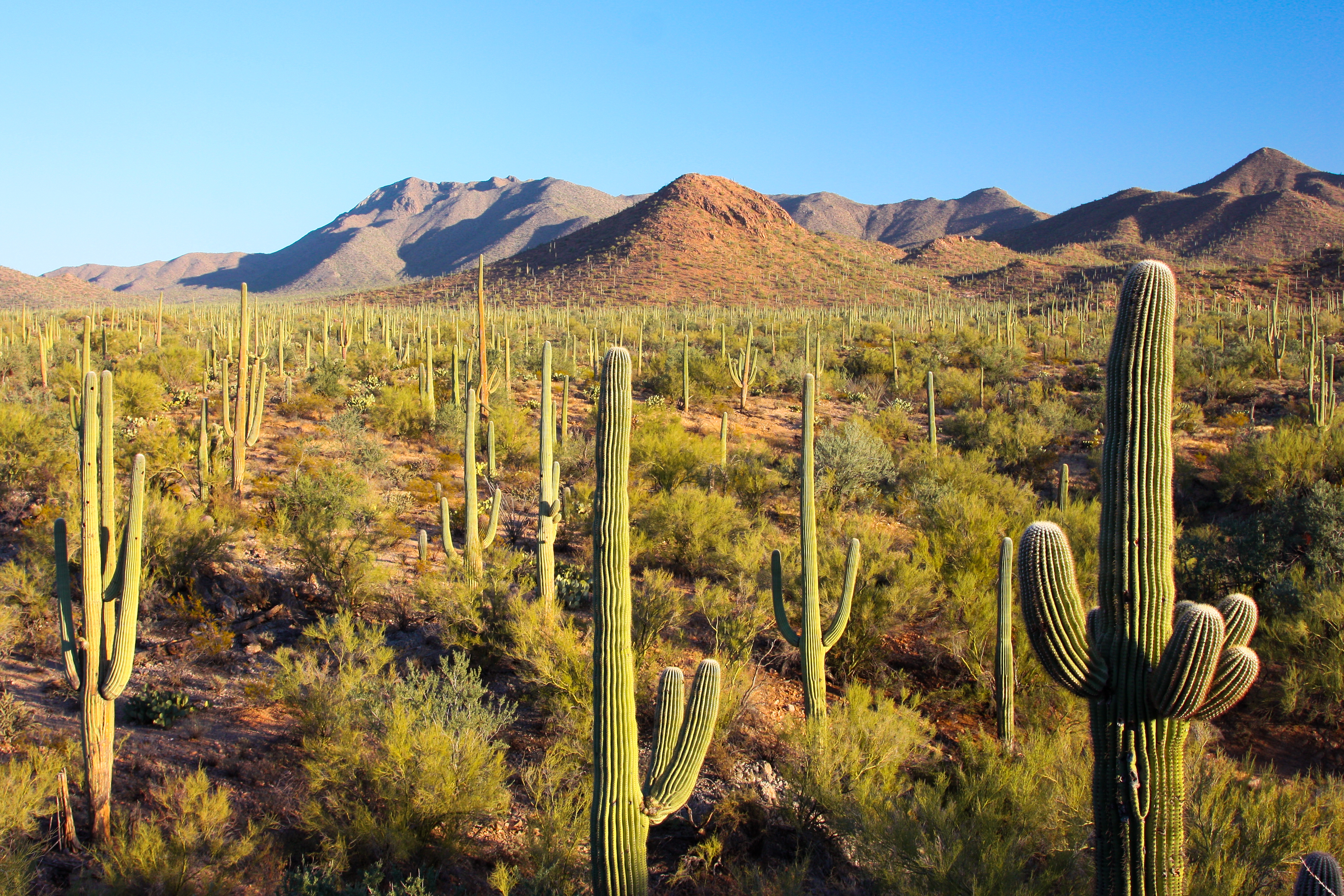
- Saguaro National Park in Arizona

- Sonoran desert

Ecology
- Realm: Nearctic
- Biome: Deserts and xeric shrublands
- Borders: List: Arizona Mountains forests; Baja California desert; California coastal sage and chaparral; California montane chaparral and woodlands; Chihuahuan Desert; Colorado Plateau shrublands; Gulf of California xeric scrub; Mojave Desert; Sierra Juárez and San Pedro Mártir pine-oak forests; Sonoran-Sinaloan transition subtropical dry forests
- Bird species: 246
- Mammal species: 120

Geography
- Area: 260,000 km^{2} (100,000 mi^{2})
- Countries: Mexico; United States
- States: Arizona; California; Baja California; Baja California Sur; Sonora
- Coordinates: 32°15′N 112°55′W
- Rivers: Colorado River
- Climate type: Hot desert (BWh)

Conservation
- Conservation status: Relatively Stable/Intact
- Habitat loss: 10.5%
- Protected: 39%

The Sonoran Desert (Spanish: Desierto de Sonora) is a hot desert and ecoregion in North America that covers parts of the northwestern Mexican states of Sonora, Baja California, and Baja California Sur, as well as part of the Southwestern United States (in Arizona and California). It has an area of 260,000 square kilometers (100,000 sq mi).

In phytogeography, the Sonoran Desert is within the Sonoran floristic province of the Madrean region of southwestern North America, part of the Holarctic realm of the northern Western Hemisphere. The desert contains a variety of unique endemic plants and animals, notably, the saguaro (Carnegiea gigantea) and organ pipe cactus (Stenocereus thurberi).

The Sonoran Desert is clearly distinct from nearby deserts (e.g., the Great Basin, Mojave, and Chihuahuan deserts) because it provides subtropical warmth in winter and two seasons of rainfall (in contrast, for example, to the Mojave's dry summers and cold winters). This creates an extreme contrast between aridity and moisture.

It is asserted (though possible contrary evidence exists) that the Sonoran is the joint hottest desert on Earth. (Note: The assertion by Zhao et al. (university based sources) is not confirmed if a higher ground temperature(s) recorded was real; Kubecka (no known university affiliation, employed by "National Weather Service in Chicago") Death Valley: 93.9^{o}C)

== Location ==
The Sonoran desert wraps around the northern end of the Gulf of California, from Baja California Sur (El Vizcaíno Biosphere Reserve in central and Pacific west coast, Central Gulf Coast subregion on east to southern tip), north through much of Baja California, excluding the central northwest mountains and Pacific west coast, through southeastern California and southwestern and southern Arizona to western and central parts of Sonora.

It is bounded on the west by the Peninsular Ranges, which separate it from the California chaparral and woodlands (northwest) and Baja California desert (Vizcaíno subregion, central and southeast) ecoregions of the Pacific slope. The Gulf of California xeric scrub ecoregion lies south of the Sonoran desert on the Gulf of California slope of the Baja California Peninsula.

To the north in California and northwest Arizona, the Sonoran Desert transitions to the colder-winter, higher-elevation Mojave, Great Basin, and Colorado Plateau deserts.

The coniferous Arizona Mountains forests are to the northeast. The Chihuahuan Desert and Sierra Madre Occidental pine–oak forests are at higher elevations to the east. To the south the Sonoran–Sinaloan transition subtropical dry forest is the transition zone from the Sonoran Desert to the tropical dry forests of the Mexican state of Sinaloa.

=== Sub-regions ===
The desert's sub-regions include the Colorado Desert of southeastern California; and the Yuma Desert east of the north-to-south section of the Colorado River in southwest Arizona. In the 1957 publication Vegetation of the Sonoran Desert, Forrest Shreve divided the Sonoran Desert into seven regions according to characteristic vegetation: Lower Colorado Valley, Arizona Upland, Plains of Sonora, Foothills of Sonora, Central Gulf Coast, Vizcaíno Region, and Magdalena Region. Many ecologists consider Shreve's Vizcaíno and Magdalena regions, which lie on the western side of the Baja California Peninsula, to be a separate ecoregion, the Baja California desert.

Within the southern Sonoran Desert in Mexico is found the Gran Desierto de Altar, with the El Pinacate y Gran Desierto de Altar Biosphere Reserve, encompassing 2,000 square kilometres (770 sq mi) of desert and mountainous regions. The biosphere reserve includes the only active erg dune region in North America. The nearest city to the biosphere reserve is Puerto Peñasco ('Rocky Point') in the state of Sonora.

Sub-regions

Sonoran Desert sub-regions include:

- Colorado Desert
- Gran Desierto de Altar
- Lechuguilla Desert
- Tonopah Desert
- Yuha Desert
- Yuma Desert

== Climate ==
The Sonoran desert has an arid subtropical climate and is considered to be the most tropical desert in North America. In the lower-elevation portions of the desert, temperatures are warm year-round, and rainfall is infrequent and irregular, often less than 90 mm (approx. 3.5") annually. The Arizona uplands are also warm year-round, but they receive 100–300 mm (approx. 4–12") of average annual rainfall, which falls in a more regular bi-seasonal pattern.

According to the Köppen climate classification system, the majority of the Sonoran Desert has a hot desert climate (BWh). Hot semi-arid climate (BSh) exists on some of the higher elevation mountains within the desert, as well as in a continuous swath on the eastern and northeastern fringes as elevations gradually rise toward the Madrean Sky Islands in the east and the Mogollon Rim in the northeast. There are also a few small areas of cold semi-arid climate (BSk) and even hot-summer Mediterranean climate ("Csa") on only the highest mountain peaks within the region.

Climate data for 7 WNW Sundad, AZ, Elevation 945 ft (288 m), 1991–2020 normals, extremes 1981–2022
Month	Jan	Feb	Mar	Apr	May	Jun	Jul	Aug	Sep	Oct	Nov	Dec	Year
Record high °F (°C)	82.1 (27.8)	90.7 (32.6)	98.8 (37.1)	103.6 (39.8)	111.5 (44.2)	117.6 (47.6)	120.6 (49.2)	116.2 (46.8)	114.1 (45.6)	105.4 (40.8)	96.6 (35.9)	83.7 (28.7)	120.6 (49.2)
Mean daily maximum °F (°C)	68.0 (20.0)	71.4 (21.9)	78.4 (25.8)	85.7 (29.8)	94.0 (34.4)	103.2 (39.6)	106.5 (41.4)	105.4 (40.8)	100.4 (38.0)	89.8 (32.1)	77.0 (25.0)	66.6 (19.2)	87.3 (30.7)
Mean daily minimum °F (°C)	39.0 (3.9)	42.0 (5.6)	47.3 (8.5)	52.6 (11.4)	60.5 (15.8)	69.2 (20.7)	77.8 (25.4)	78.0 (25.6)	70.5 (21.4)	57.4 (14.1)	45.3 (7.4)	37.8 (3.2)	56.5 (13.6)
Record low °F (°C)	18.1 (−7.7)	24.3 (−4.3)	29.0 (−1.7)	38.1 (3.4)	44.3 (6.8)	52.8 (11.6)	62.4 (16.9)	64.5 (18.1)	51.2 (10.7)	36.5 (2.5)	25.8 (−3.4)	19.9 (−6.7)	18.1 (−7.7)
Average precipitation inches (mm)	0.74 (19)	0.71 (18)	0.55 (14)	0.13 (3.3)	0.08 (2.0)	0.03 (0.76)	0.68 (17)	0.78 (20)	0.52 (13)	0.39 (9.9)	0.43 (11)	0.62 (16)	5.64 (143)
Average snowfall inches (cm)	0.0 (0.0)	0.0 (0.0)	0.0 (0.0)	0.0 (0.0)	0.0 (0.0)	0.0 (0.0)	0.0 (0.0)	0.0 (0.0)	0.0 (0.0)	0.0 (0.0)	0.0 (0.0)	0.0 (0.0)	0.0 (0.0)
Average relative humidity (%)	40.6	37.7	31.9	23.1	20.4	17.5	27.4	32.0	30.6	28.1	32.1	40.5	30.1
Average dew point °F (°C)	30.1 (−1.1)	31.2 (−0.4)	32.4 (0.2)	29.8 (−1.2)	33.5 (0.8)	37.0 (2.8)	53.8 (12.1)	57.7 (14.3)	51.0 (10.6)	38.6 (3.7)	31.2 (−0.4)	28.9 (−1.7)	38.0 (3.3)
Source: PRISM

== Flora ==
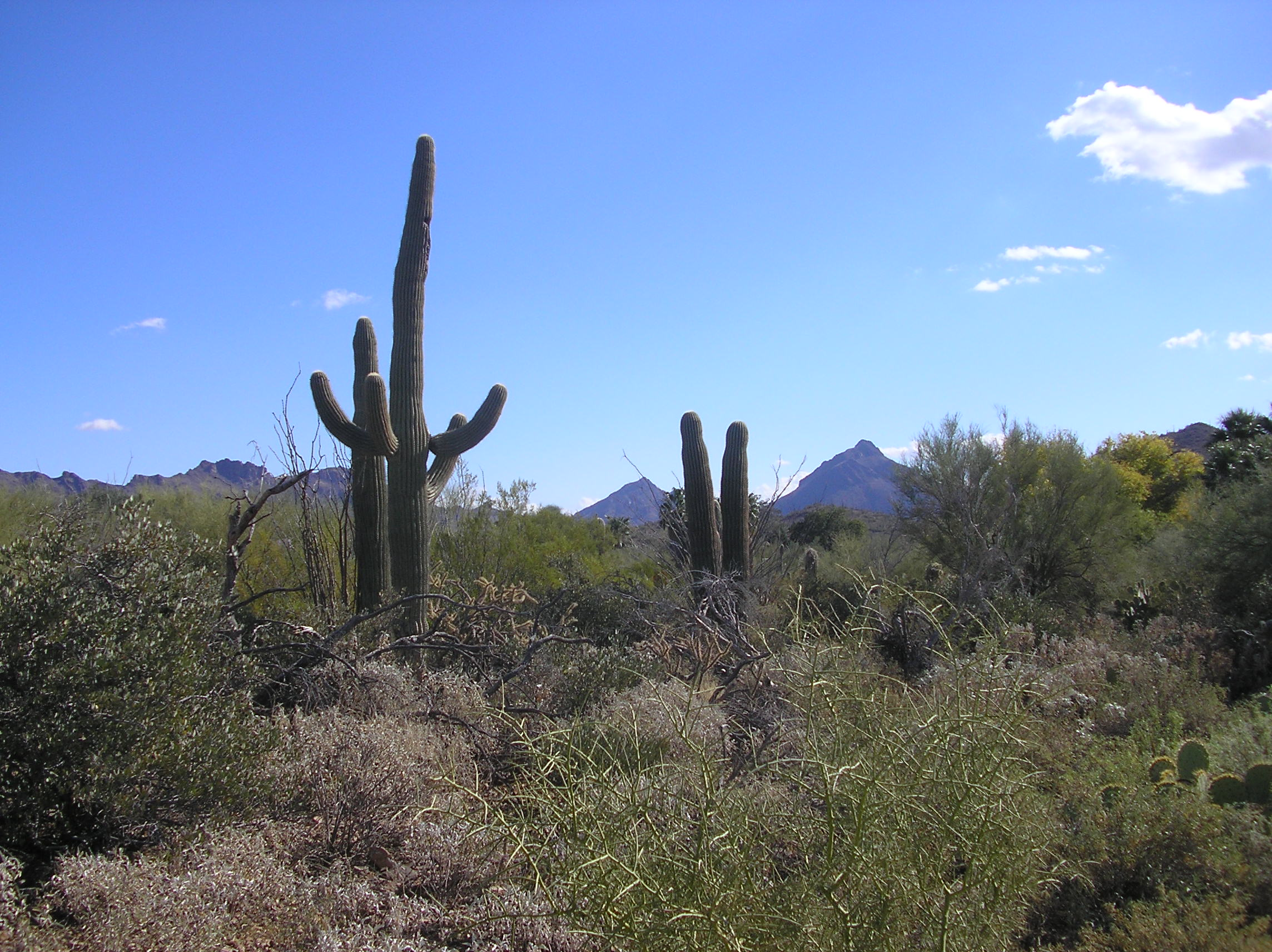
The Sonoran Desert near Tucson, Arizona during winter

Many plants not only survive, but thrive in the harsh conditions of the Sonoran Desert. Many have evolved specialized adaptations to the desert climate. The Sonoran Desert's bi-seasonal rainfall pattern results in more plant species than any other desert in the world. The Sonoran Desert includes plant genera and species from the agave family, palm family, cactus family, legume family, and numerous others. Many of these adaptations occur in food crops. Mission Garden is a living agricultural museum that showcases foods that have been grown in the Sonoran Desert for over 4000 years.

The Sonoran is the only place in the world where the famous saguaro cactus (Carnegiea gigantea) grows in the wild. Cholla (Cylindropuntia spp.), beavertail (Opuntia basilaris), hedgehog (Echinocereus spp.), fishhook (Ferocactus wislizeni), prickly pear (Opuntia spp.), nightblooming cereus (Peniocereus spp.), and organ pipe (Stenocereus thurberi) are other taxa of cacti found here. Cacti provide food and homes to many desert mammals and birds, with showy flowers in reds, pinks, yellows, and whites, blooming most commonly from late March through June, depending on the species and seasonal temperatures.

Creosote bush (Larrea tridentata) and bur sage (Ambrosia dumosa) dominate valley floors. Indigo bush (Psorothamnus fremontii) and Mormon tea are other shrubs that may be found. Wildflowers of the Sonoran Desert include desert sand verbena (Abronia villosa), desert sunflower (Geraea canescens), and evening primroses.

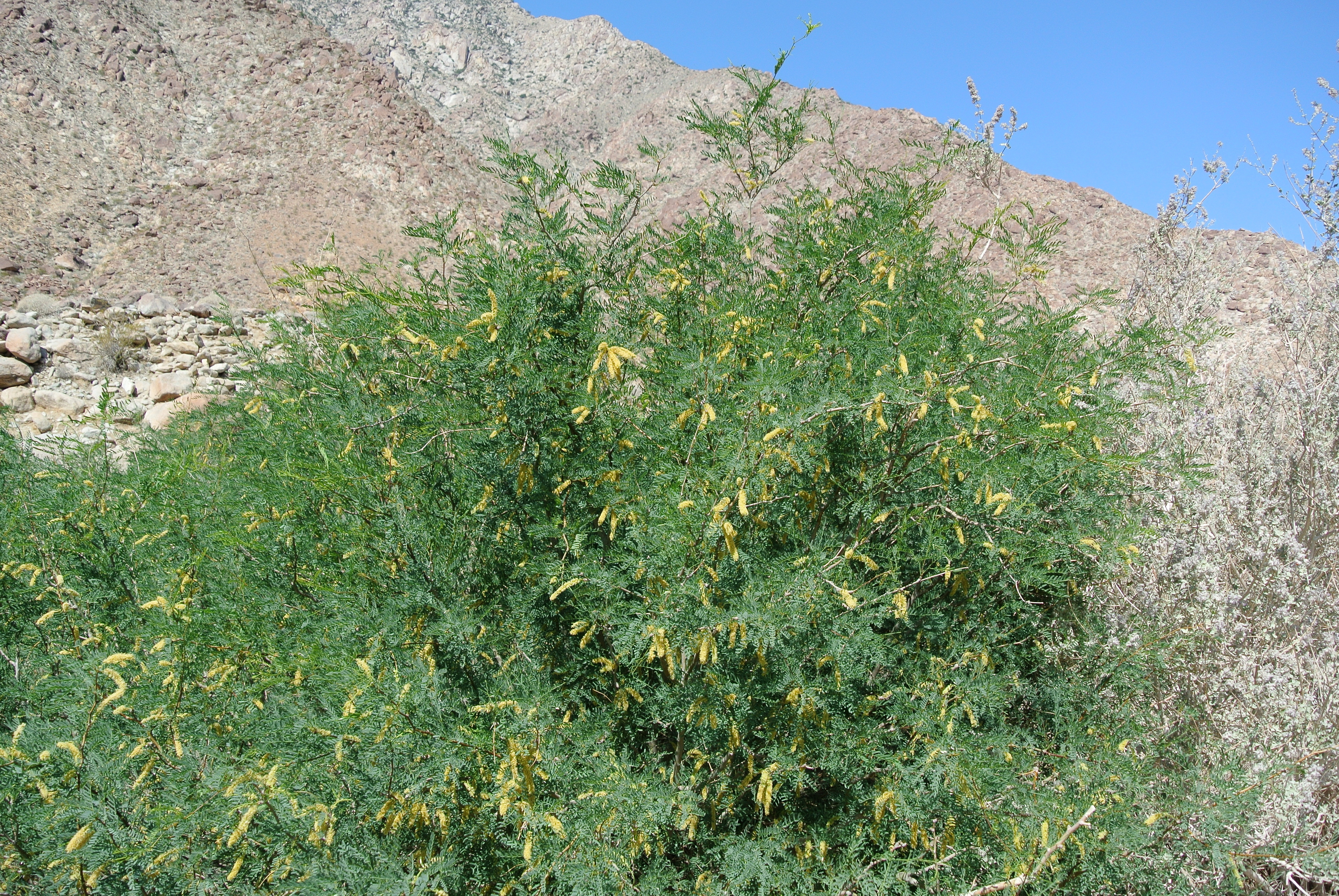
Velvet mesquite (Prosopis velutina)

Ascending from the valley up bajadas, various subtrees such as velvet mesquite (Prosopis velutina), palo verde (Parkinsonia florida), desert ironwood (Olneya tesota), desert willow (Chilopsis linearis ssp. arcuata), and crucifixion thorn (Canotia holacantha) are common, as well as multi-stemmed ocotillo (Fouquieria splendens). Shrubs found at higher elevations include whitethorn acacia (Acacia constricta), fairy duster, and jojoba. In the desert subdivisions found on Baja California, cardon cactus, elephant tree, and boojum tree occur.

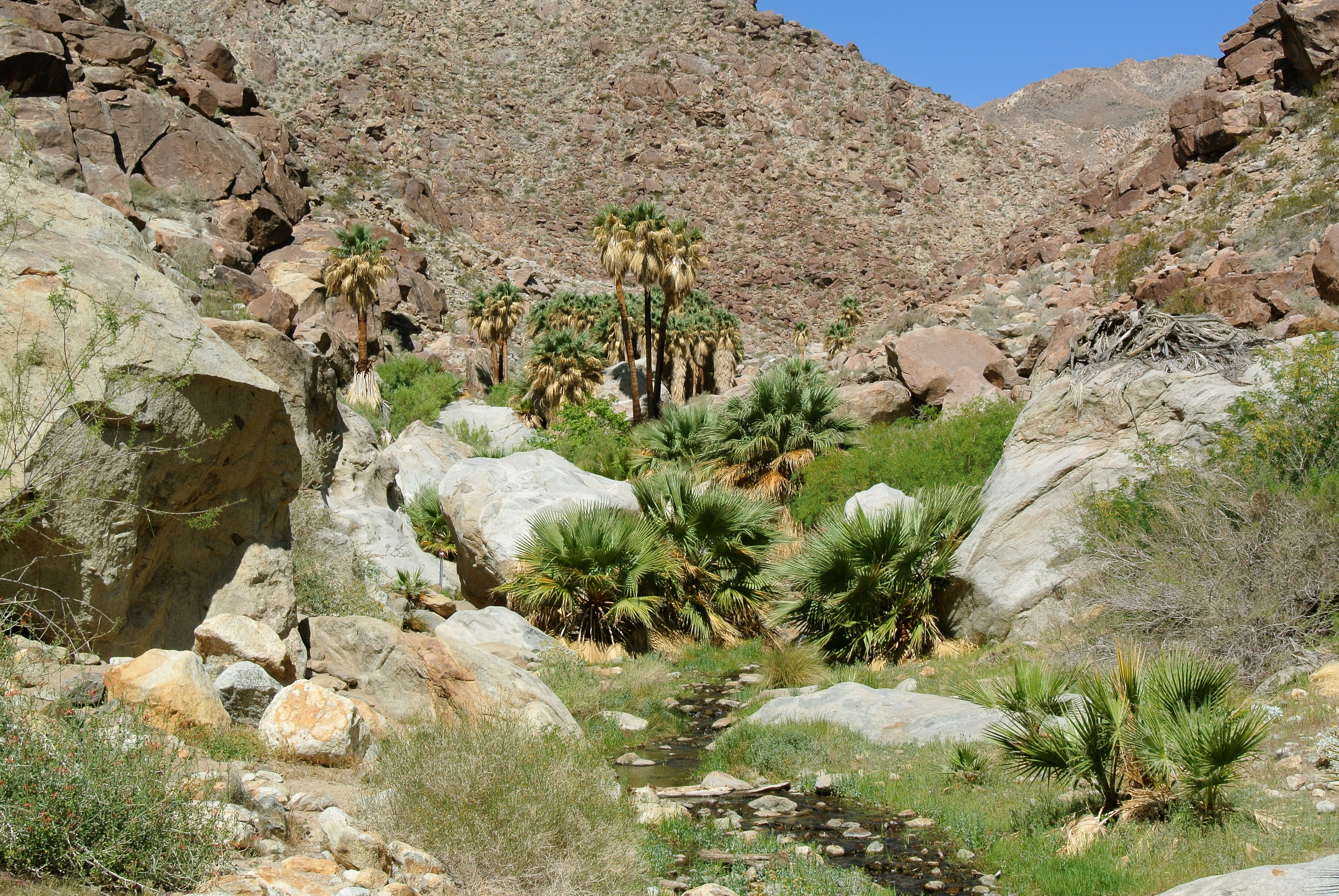
Washingtonia filifera, the desert fan palm, in Anza Borrego Desert State Park

The California fan palm (Washingtonia filifera) is the only palm species native to the western United States. Within the Sonoran Desert it is most characteristic of the Colorado Desert of southeastern California, where it forms groves around spring-fed oases such as those in Anza-Borrego Desert State Park and Joshua Tree National Park. Outside California, natural populations also occur in Arizona, including at Castle Creek in the Bradshaw Mountains, the Hassayampa River Preserve, and Kofa National Wildlife Refuge.

== Fauna ==
The Sonoran Desert is home to a wide variety of fauna that have adapted and thrive in the hot, arid desert environment, such as the Gila monster, bobcat, mule deer, pronghorn antelope, jackrabbit, burrowing owl, greater roadrunner, western diamondback rattlesnake, and elf owl. There are 350 bird species, 20 amphibian species, over 100 reptile species, 30 native fish species, and over 1000 native bee species found in the Sonoran. The Sonoran Desert area southeast of Tucson and near the Mexican border is vital habitat for the only population of jaguars living within the United States. The Colorado River Delta was once an ecological hotspot within the Sonoran desert due to the Colorado river in this otherwise dry area, but the delta has been greatly reduced in extent due to damming and use of the river upstream. Species that have higher heat tolerance are able to thrive in the conditions of the Sonoran Desert. One such insect species that has evolved a means to thrive in this environment is Drosophila mettleri, a Sonoran Desert fly. This fly contains a specialized P450 detoxification system that enables it to nest in the cool region of exudate moistened soil. Thus, the fly is one of few that can tolerate the high desert temperatures and successfully reproduce.

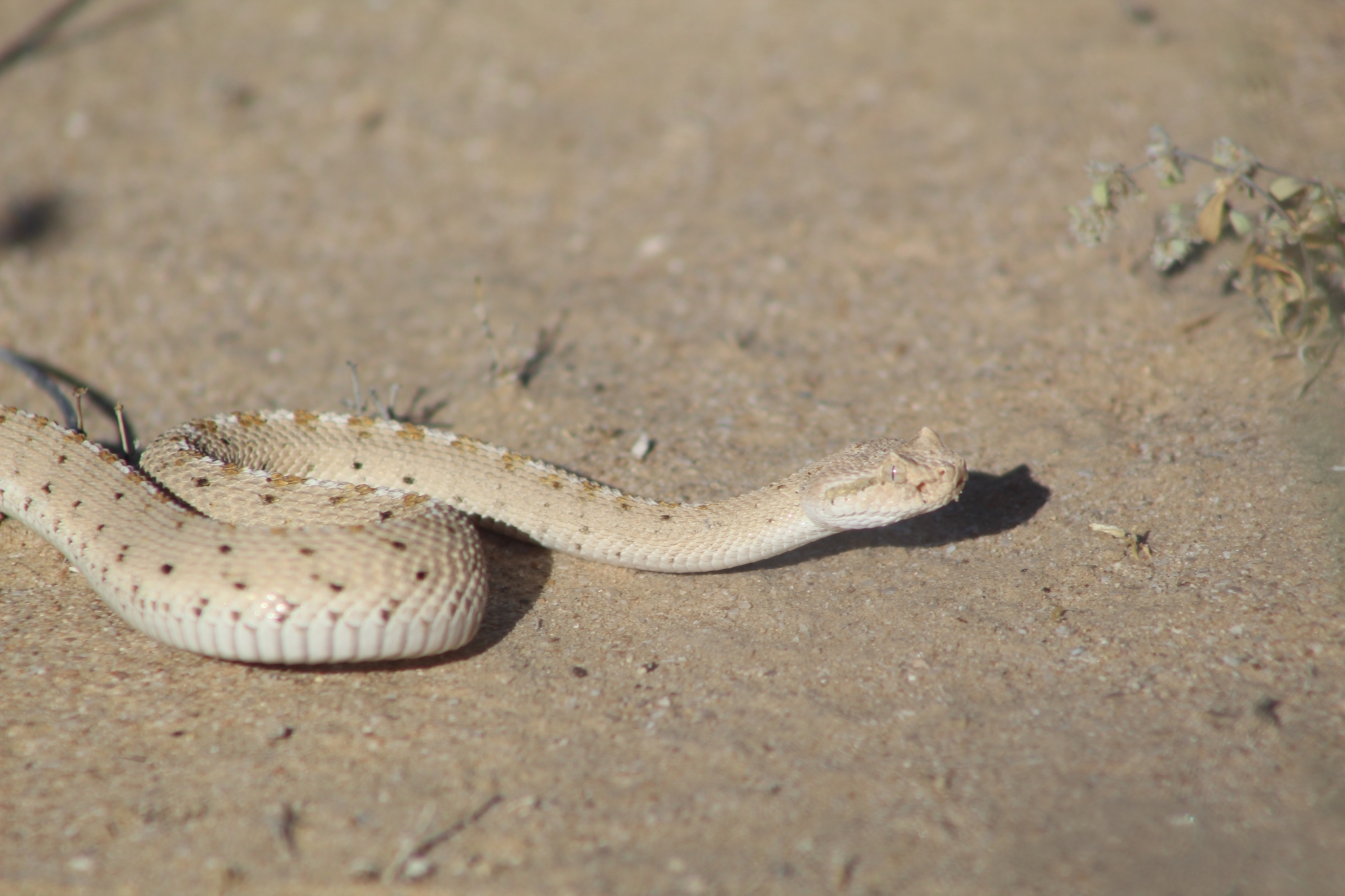
Crotalus cerastes in Puerto Peñasco, Mexico

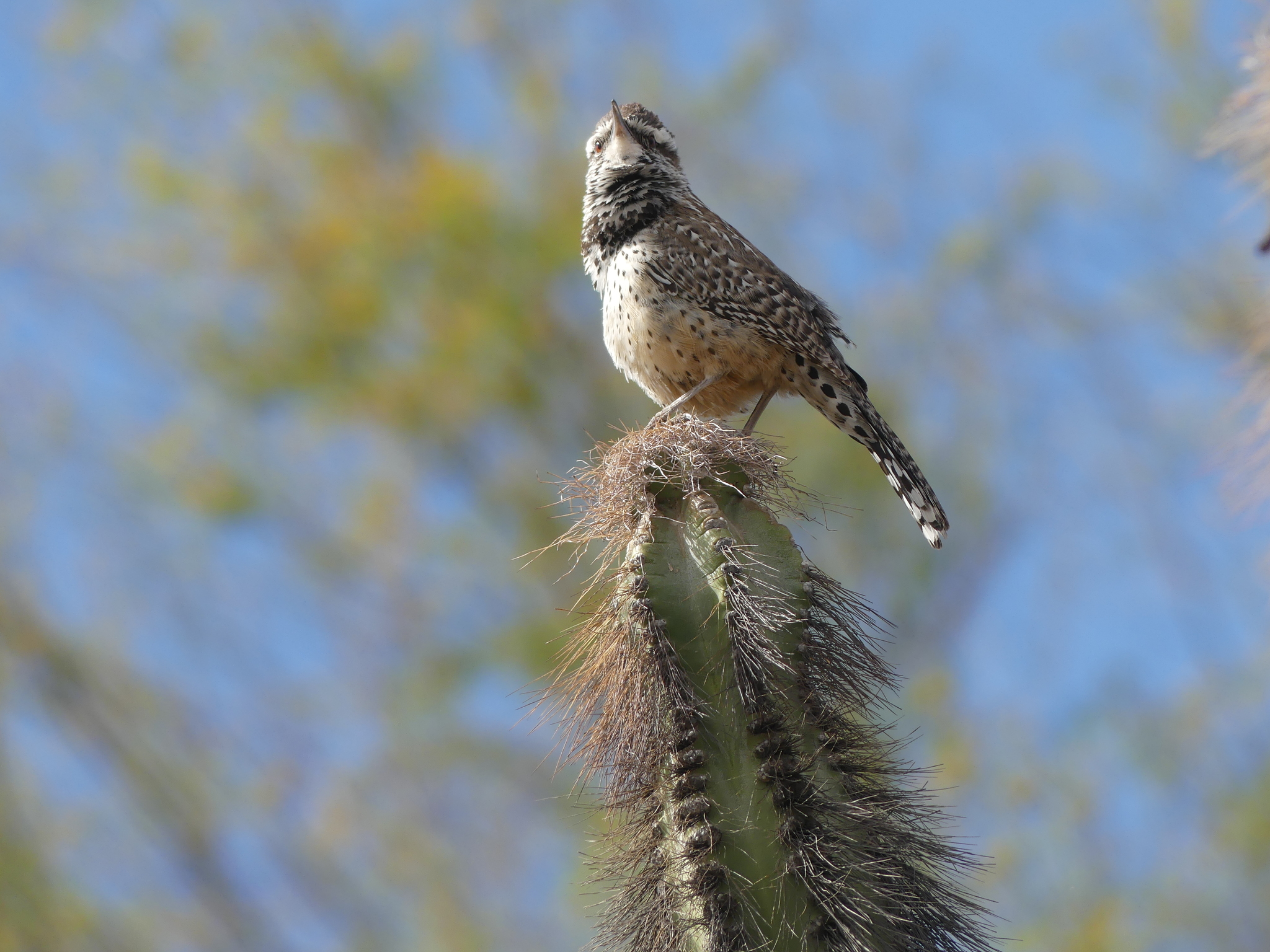
Campylorhynchus brunneicapillus in Phoenix, United States

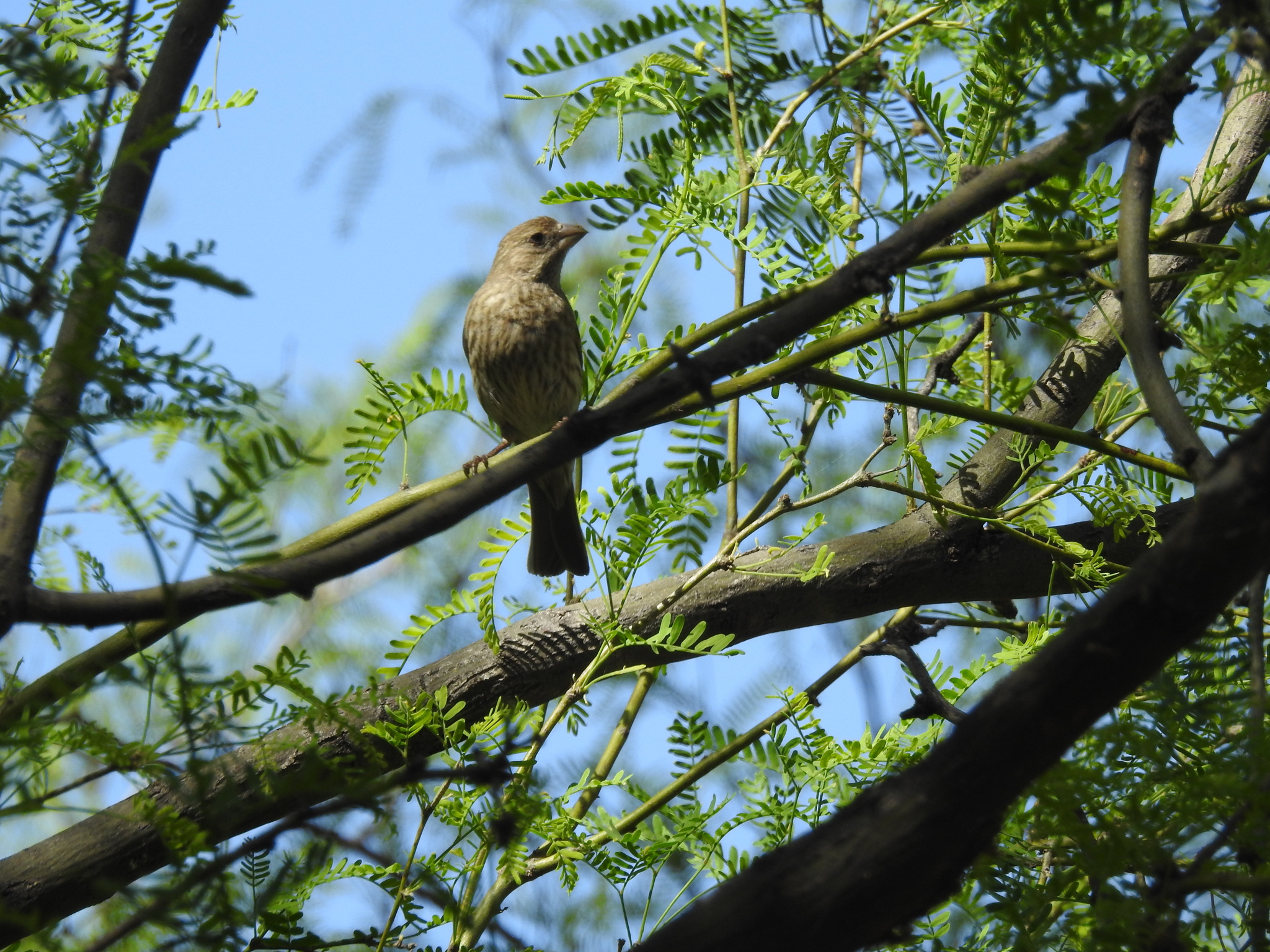
Haemorhous mexicanus in Maricopa County, United States

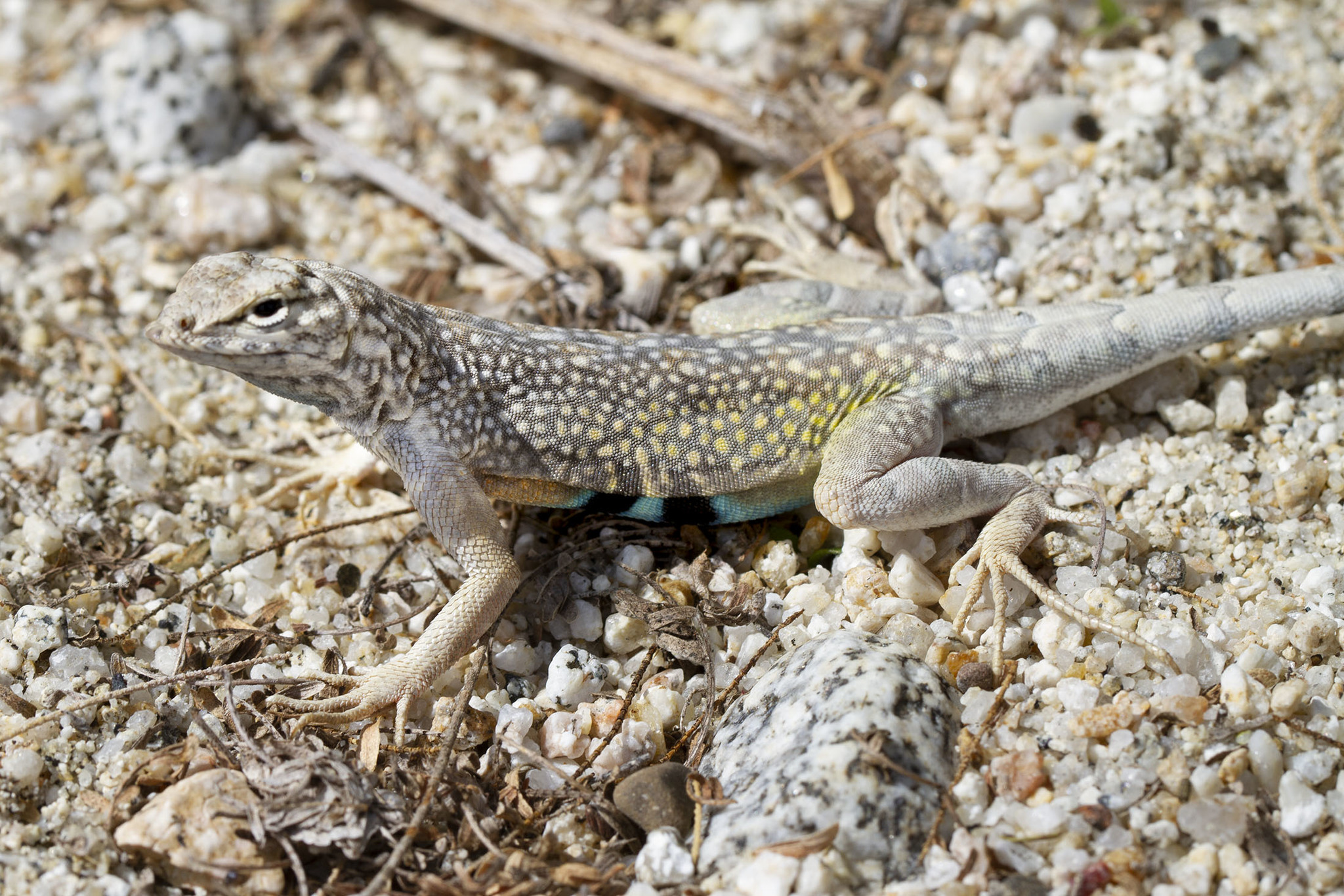
Callisaurus draconoides in Los Cabos, Mexico

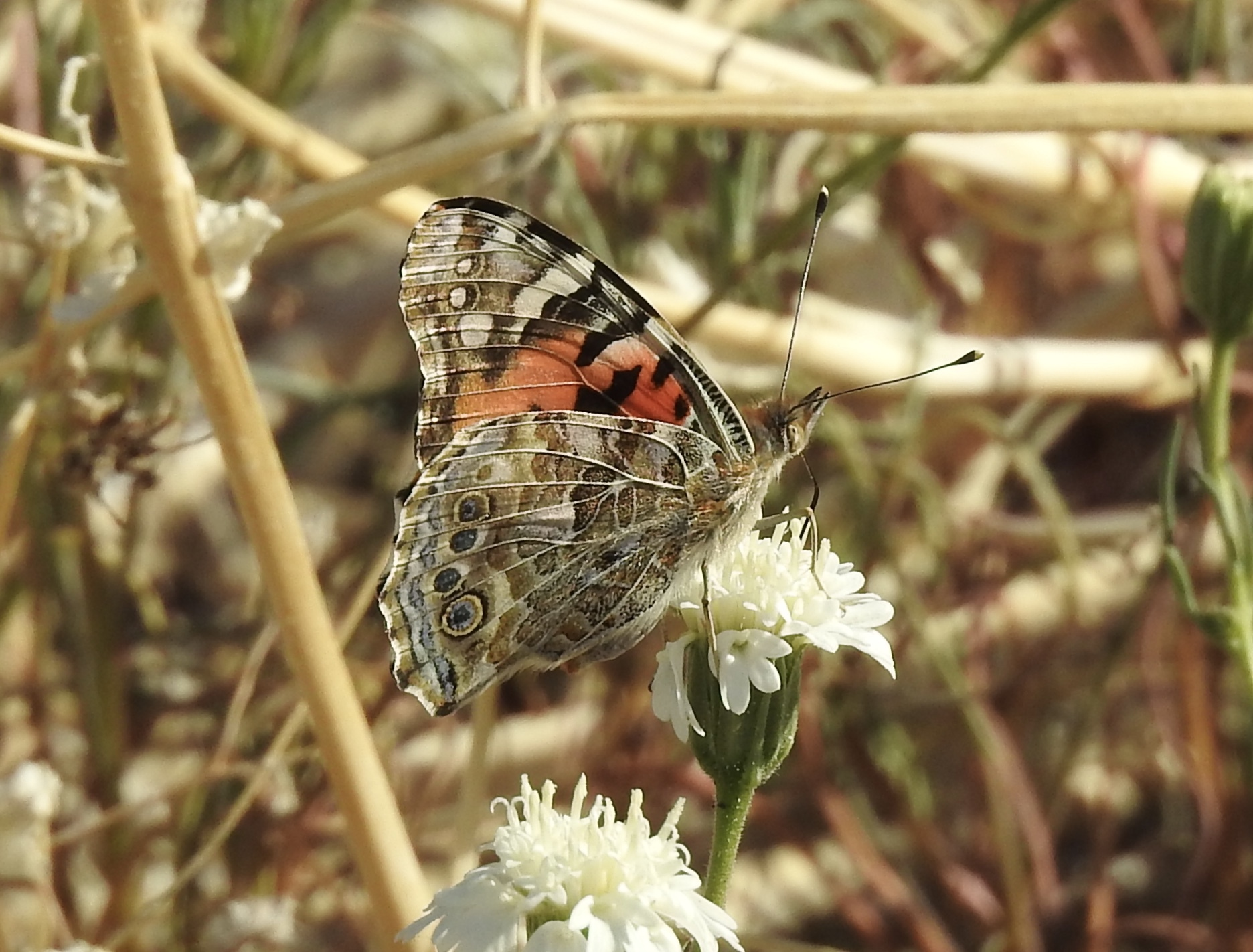
Vanessa cardui in Riverside County, United States

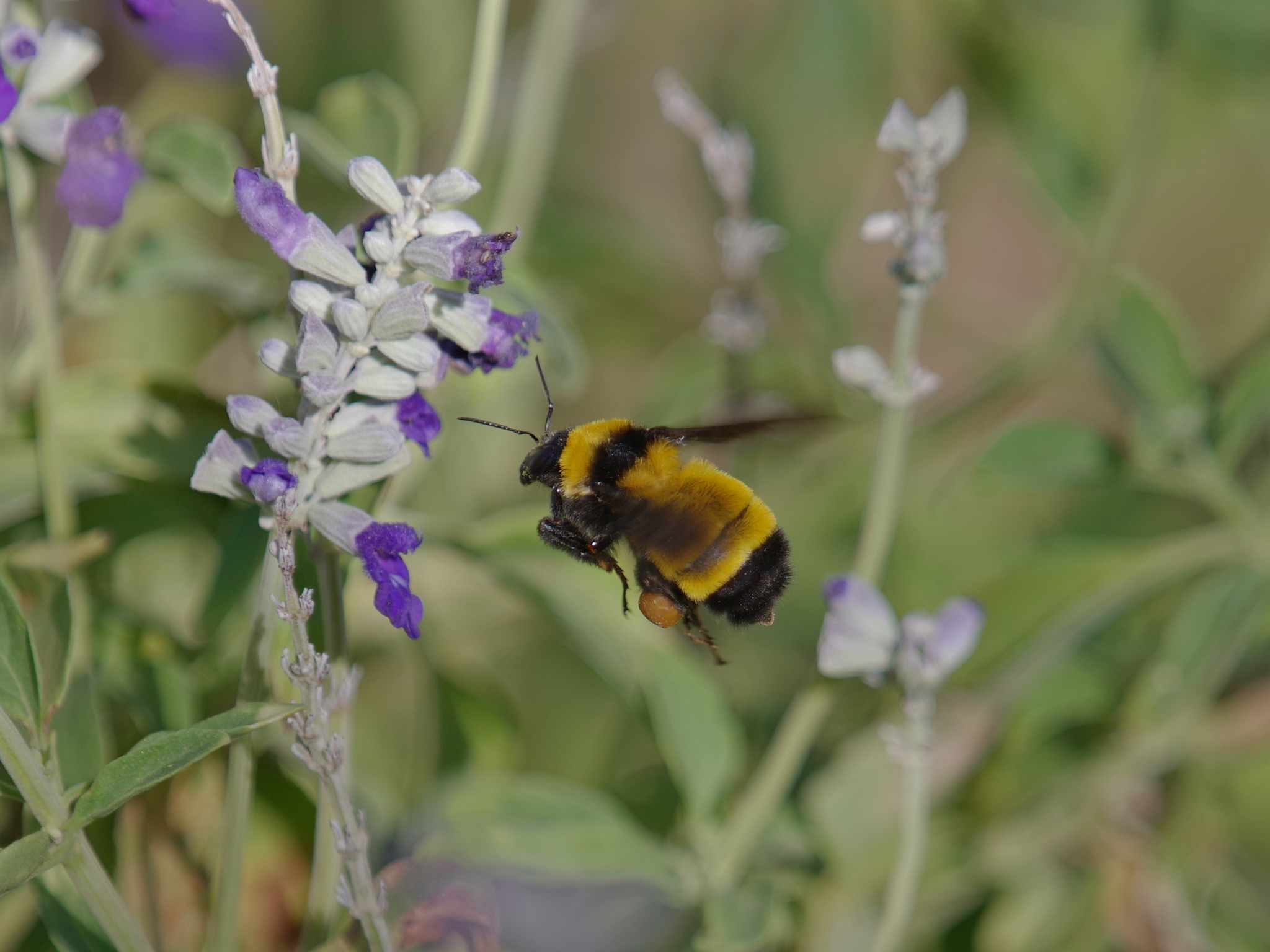
Bombus sonorus in Phoenix, United States

== Human population ==
The Sonoran Desert is home to the cultures of over 17 contemporary Native American tribes, with settlements at American Indian reservations in California and Arizona, as well as populations in Mexico.

The largest city in the Sonoran Desert is Phoenix, Arizona, with a 2017 metropolitan population of about 4.7 million. Located on the Salt River in central Arizona, it is one of the fastest-growing metropolitan areas in the United States. In 2007 in the Phoenix area, desert was losing ground to urban sprawl at a rate of approximately 4,000 square meters (1 acre) per hour.

The next largest cities are Tucson, in southern Arizona, with a metro area population of just over 1 million, and Mexicali, Baja California, with a similarly sized metropolitan population of around 1,000,000. The metropolitan area of Hermosillo, Sonora, has a population close to 900,000. Ciudad Obregón, Sonora, in the southern part of the desert, has a population of 375,800.

=== California ===
The Coachella Valley, located in the Colorado Desert section of the Sonoran Desert, has a population of 365,000. Several famous Southern California desert resort cities such as Palm Springs and Palm Desert are located here.

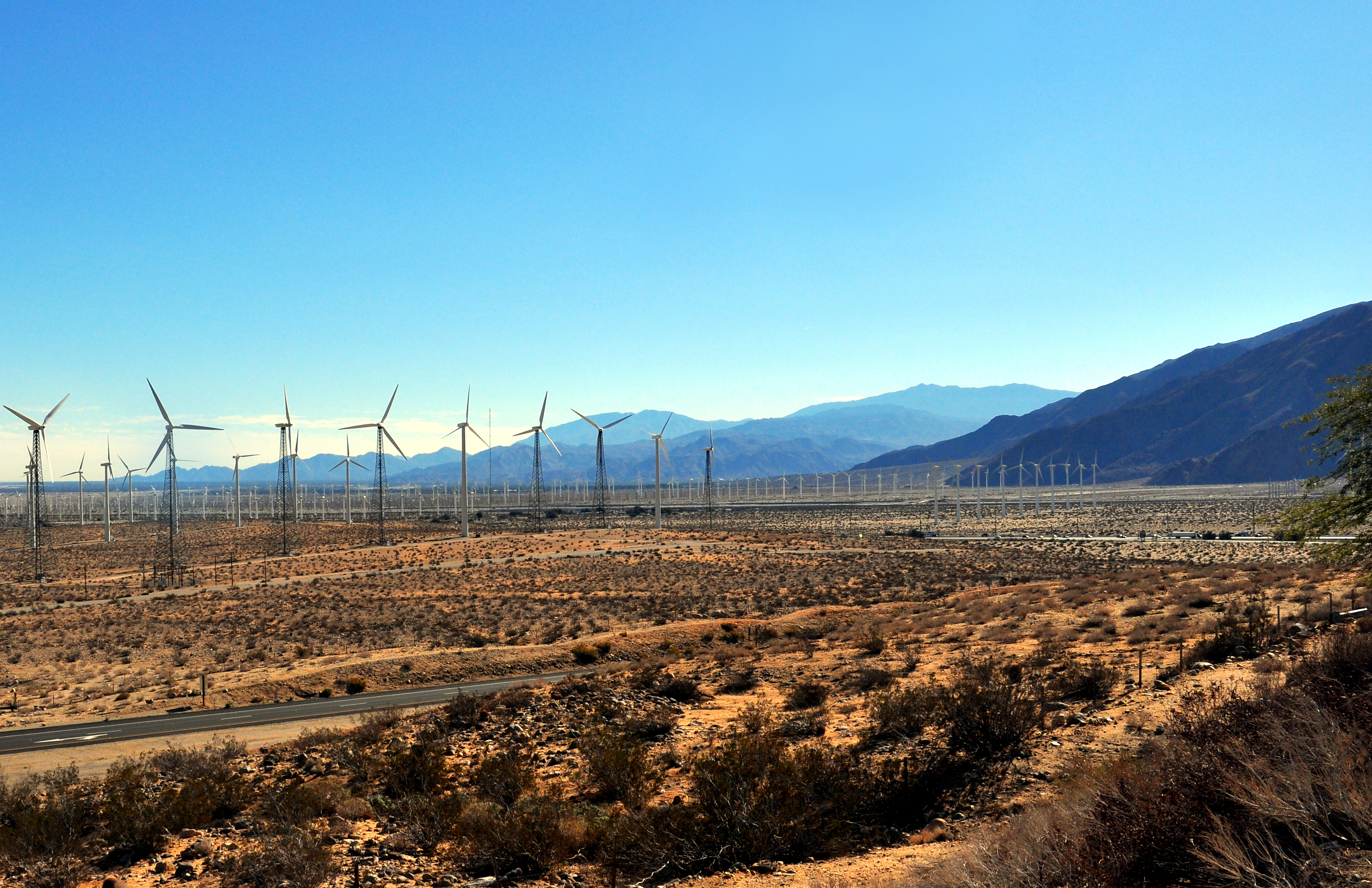
The entrance to Palm Springs, California via Highway 62

During the winter months, from November to April, the daytime temperatures in the Coachella Valley range from 70 °F (21 °C) to 90 °F (32 °C) and corresponding nighttime lows range from 46 °F (8 °C) to 68 °F (20 °C) making it a popular winter resort destination. Due to its warm year-round climate citrus and subtropical fruits such as mangoes, figs, and dates are grown in the Coachella Valley and adjacent Imperial Valley. The Imperial Valley has a total population of over 180,000 and has a similar climate to that of the Coachella Valley. Other cities include Borrego Springs, Indio, Coachella, Calexico, El Centro, Imperial, and Blythe.

=== United States–Mexico border region ===
Straddling the Mexico–United States border, the Sonoran desert is an important migration corridor for humans and animals.

== Protected areas ==
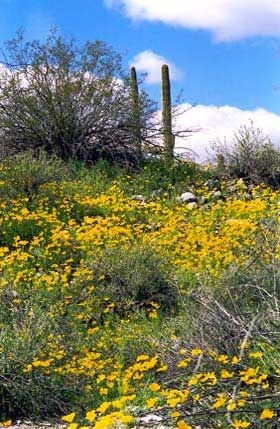
Mexican goldpoppies in the Sonoran Desert National Monument

There are many National Parks and Monuments; federal and state nature reserves and wildlife refuges; state, county, and city parks; and government or nonprofit group operated natural history museums, science research institutes, and botanical gardens and desert landscape gardens.

- Index: Protected areas of the Sonoran Desert
- Index: Protected areas of the Colorado Desert

Sonoran Desert protected areas include

- Arizona–Sonora Desert Museum
- Sonoran Desert National Monument
- Boyce Thompson Arboretum State Park – Sonoran Desert flora arboretum
- Anza–Borrego Desert State Park
- Organ Pipe Cactus National Monument
- Saguaro National Park
- Joshua Tree National Park
- Reserva de la Biosfera el Pinacate y Gran Desierto de Altar – Pinacate National Park, in Sonora, Mexico
- Indio Hills Palms State Reserve
- Coachella Valley National Wildlife Refuge
- Cabeza Prieta National Wildlife Refuge
- Kofa National Wildlife Refuge
- South Mountain Park
- Sonoran Arthropod Studies Institute
- Skyline Regional Park

== See also ==
- Chihuahuan Desert
- Dust storm
- List of deserts by area
- List of ecoregions in the United States (EPA) (the Sonoran Basin and Range is item 81 on the map)
- List of ecoregions in the United States (WWF)
- Mojave Desert
- Spanish missions in the Sonoran Desert
- Category:Mountain ranges of the Sonoran Desert
