= Peninsular Ranges =

Group of mountain ranges in Southern California and northern Mexico

Coordinates: 32°30′53″N 115°40′30″W

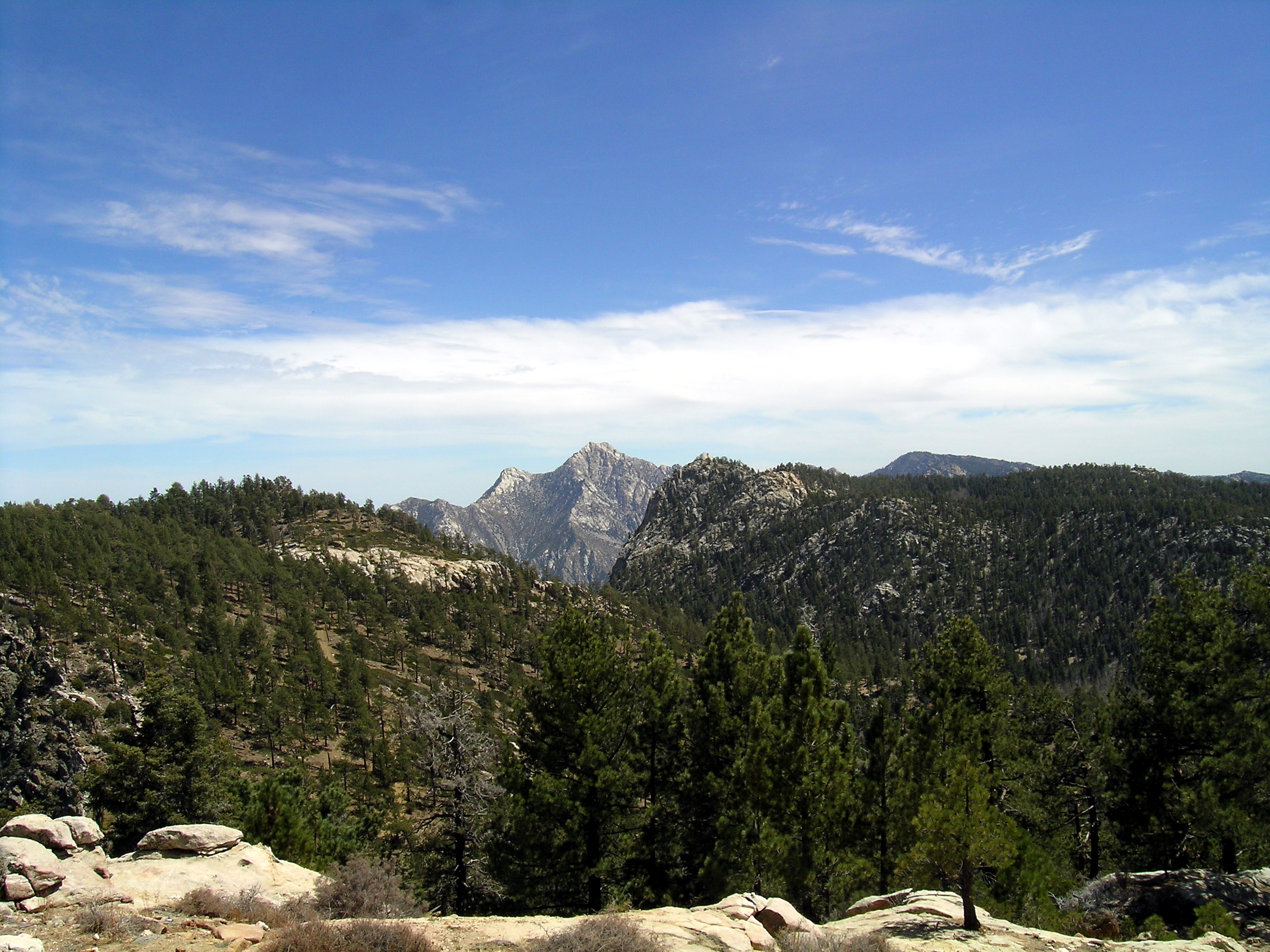
- Sierra San Pedro Mártir and Devils Peak, Southern Baja California, Mexico

Highest point
- Peak: San Jacinto Peak
- Elevation: 10,834 ft (3,302 m)

Geography
- Countries: Mexico; United States
- States: Baja California Sur; Baja California; California

Geology
- Rock age: Mesozoic
- Rock type: Granite

The Peninsular Ranges (also called the Lower California province) are a group of mountain ranges that stretch 930 mi (1,500 km) from Southern California to the southern tip of the Baja California peninsula; they are part of the North American Pacific Coast Ranges, which run along the Pacific coast from Alaska to Mexico. Elevations range from 500 to 10,834 ft (150 to 3,300 m).

== Geography ==
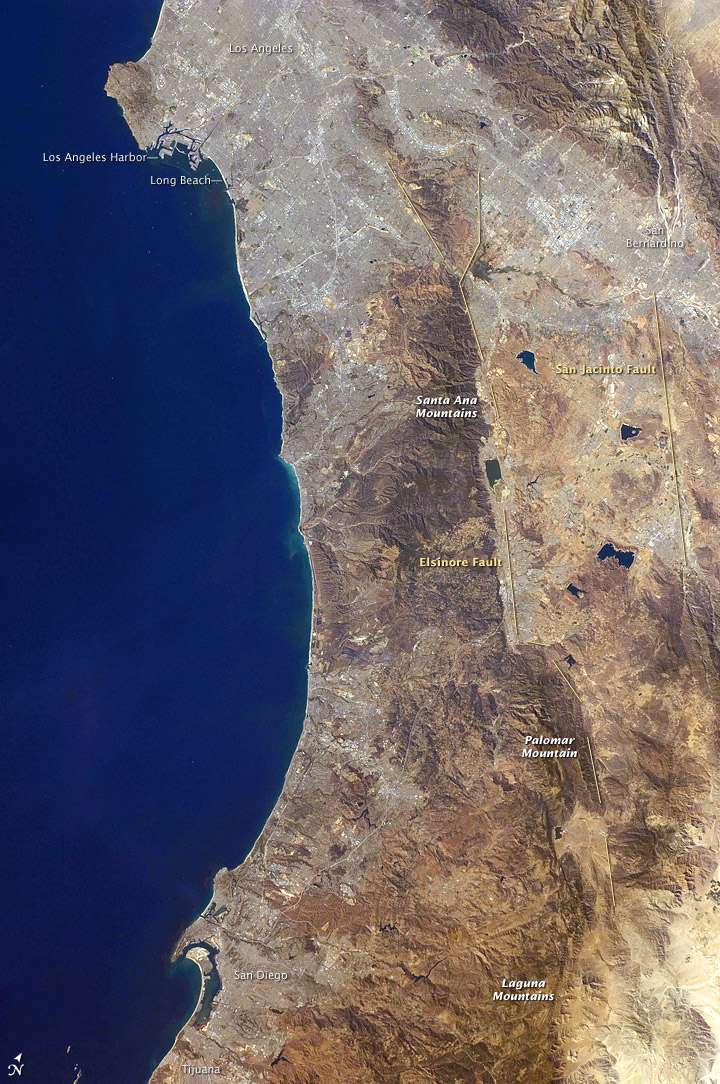
Topographic depiction of the Peninsular Mountains within the US. From north to south, they consist of the Santa Ana, Palomar and Laguna Mountains.

The Peninsular Ranges include the Santa Ana Mountains, the Temescal Mountains, other mountains and ranges of the Perris Block, the San Jacinto Mountains, the Laguna Mountains of southern California continuing from north to south with the Sierra de Juárez, the Sierra de San Pedro Mártir, the Sierra de San Borja, the Sierra de San Francisco, the Sierra de la Giganta, and the Sierra de la Laguna in Baja California. Palomar Mountain, home to Palomar Observatory, is in the Peninsular Ranges in San Diego County, as are the San Ysidro Mountains and Viejas Mountain. The Peninsular Ranges run predominantly north-south, unlike the Transverse Ranges to their north, which mostly run east-west.

== Geology ==
Rocks in the ranges are dominated by Mesozoic granitic rocks, derived from the same massive batholith which forms the core of the Sierra Nevada Mountains in California. They are part of a geologic province known as the Salinian Block which broke off the North American plate as the San Andreas Fault and Gulf of California came into being.

Between the Peninsular Ranges and the Transverse Ranges lies the complex Malibu Coast—Santa Monica—Hollywood fault, which exists as the border between these two mostly geologically unitary provinces.

== Ecology and flora ==
=== Nearctic ===
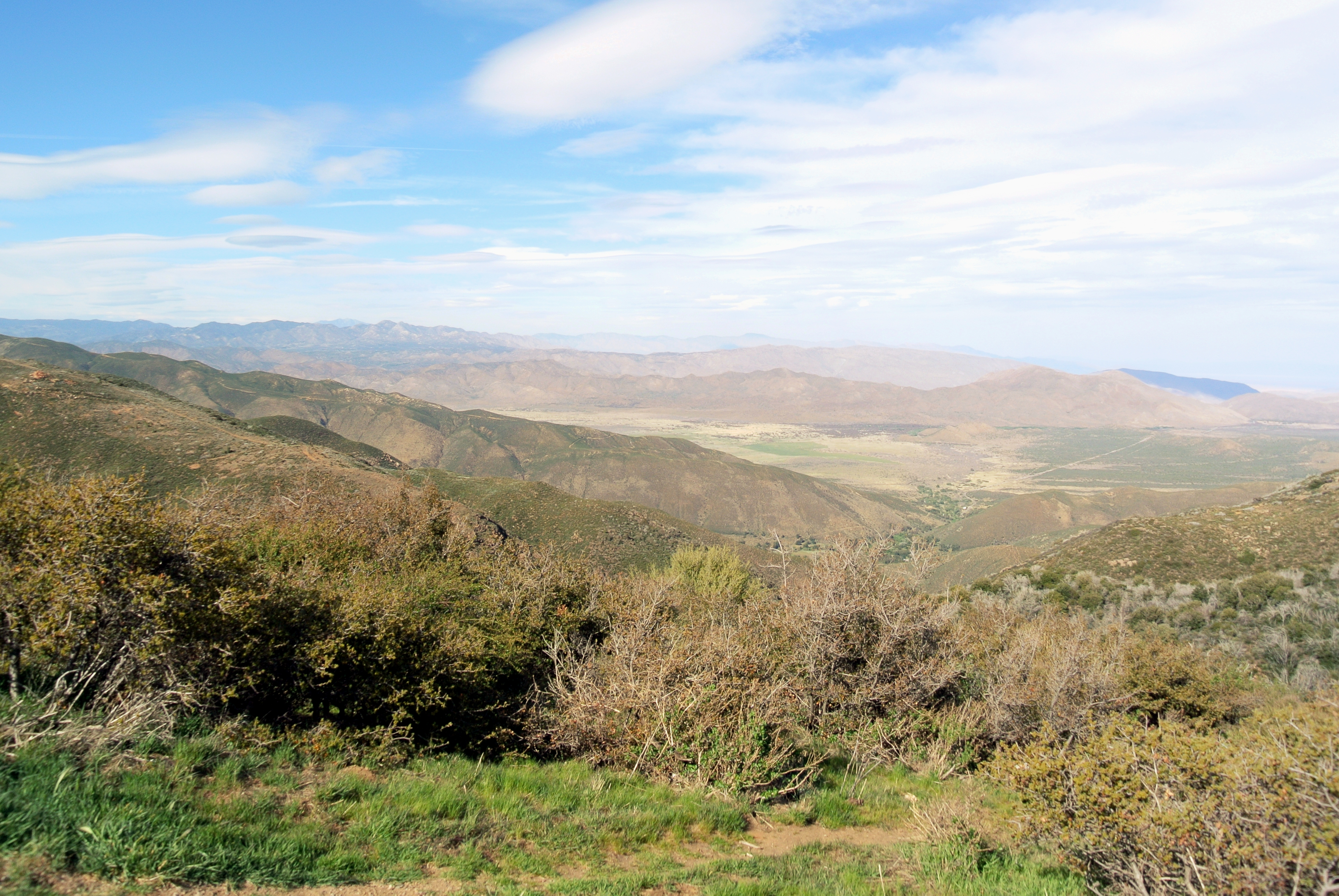
View from Inspiration Point in the Laguna Mountains, 2013. Chaparral in the foreground, Anza Borrego Desert State Park on the right of the background.

Most of the Peninsular Ranges are in the Nearctic realm. Several terrestrial ecoregions cover portions of the Peninsular Ranges. On the western side of the northern portion of the ranges, the montane sub-ecoregion of the California chaparral and woodlands ecoregion covers southern California and northern Baja California. On the western side of the southern portion of the ranges, the Baja California desert ecoregion covers the southern portion of the Peninsular Ranges in Baja California and Baja California Sur. On the eastern side of the northern ranges, the Sonoran Desert ecoregion covers southeastern California and northeastern Baja California as far south as the town of Loreto. On the eastern side of the Laguna Mountains in San Diego County, Anza-Borrego Desert State Park is known for its springtime profusion of Colorado Desert (Sonoran) wildflowers. On the eastern (Gulf of California) side of the southern portion of the ranges, the Gulf of California xeric scrub ecoregion covers the range in Baja California Sur.

The higher portions of the Peninsular Ranges, especially the west-facing slopes, are home to coniferous and mixed evergreen forests. Cleveland National Forest covers much of the higher Southern California Peninsular Ranges. The vegetation includes oak woodlands and forests of Jeffrey pine (Pinus jeffreyi) and Coulter pine (Pinus coulteri). The Sierra Juarez and San Pedro Martir pine-oak forests cover the upper slopes of the Sierra Juarez and San Pedro Martir ranges in Baja California. These isolated forests are predominantly composed of tamarack pine (Pinus contorta subsp. murrayana), sugar pine (Pinus lambertiana), Parry pinyon (Pinus quadrifolia), white fir (Abies concolor), California incense cedar (Calocedrus decurrens), and junipers. Oak species include coast live oak (Quercus agrifolia), Engelmann oak (Quercus engelmannii), canyon live oak (Quercus chrysolepis), and Baja oak (Quercus peninsularis). These higher portions of the Peninsular Ranges harbor many rare and endemic species.

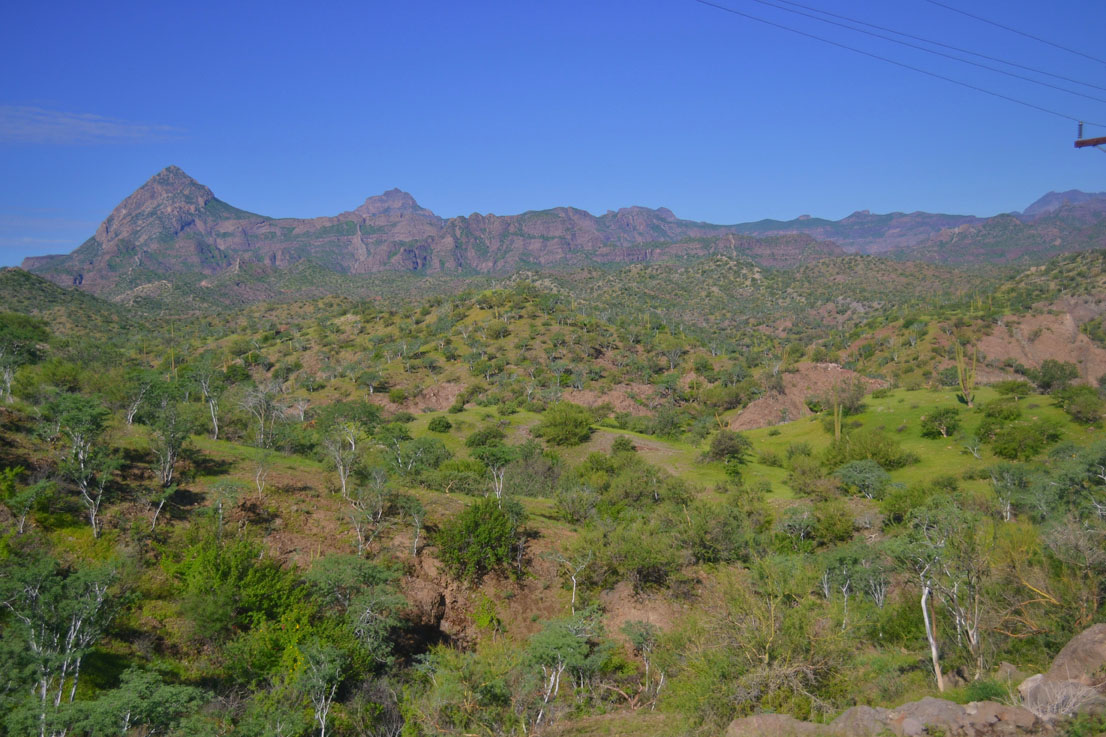
The Sierra de la Giganta in Baja California Sur

=== Neotropic ===
Southern Baja California Sur is part of the Neotropical realm. The southern end of the Baja California Peninsula, including the Sierra de la Laguna Peninsular Range, was, like the rest of the peninsula, originally part of the Mexican mainland. It was sheared off the mainland, becoming at one time an island, and evolved in relative isolation from the northern part of the peninsula and ranges. Its flora and fauna share many affinities with southern Mexico and Central America. It includes three distinct ecoregions, the Sierra de la Laguna dry forests, Sierra de la Laguna pine-oak forests, and San Lucan xeric scrub.

== See also ==
- Peninsular Ranges index
- Transverse Ranges
- List of mountain ranges
- Santa Maria Valley (San Diego County)
