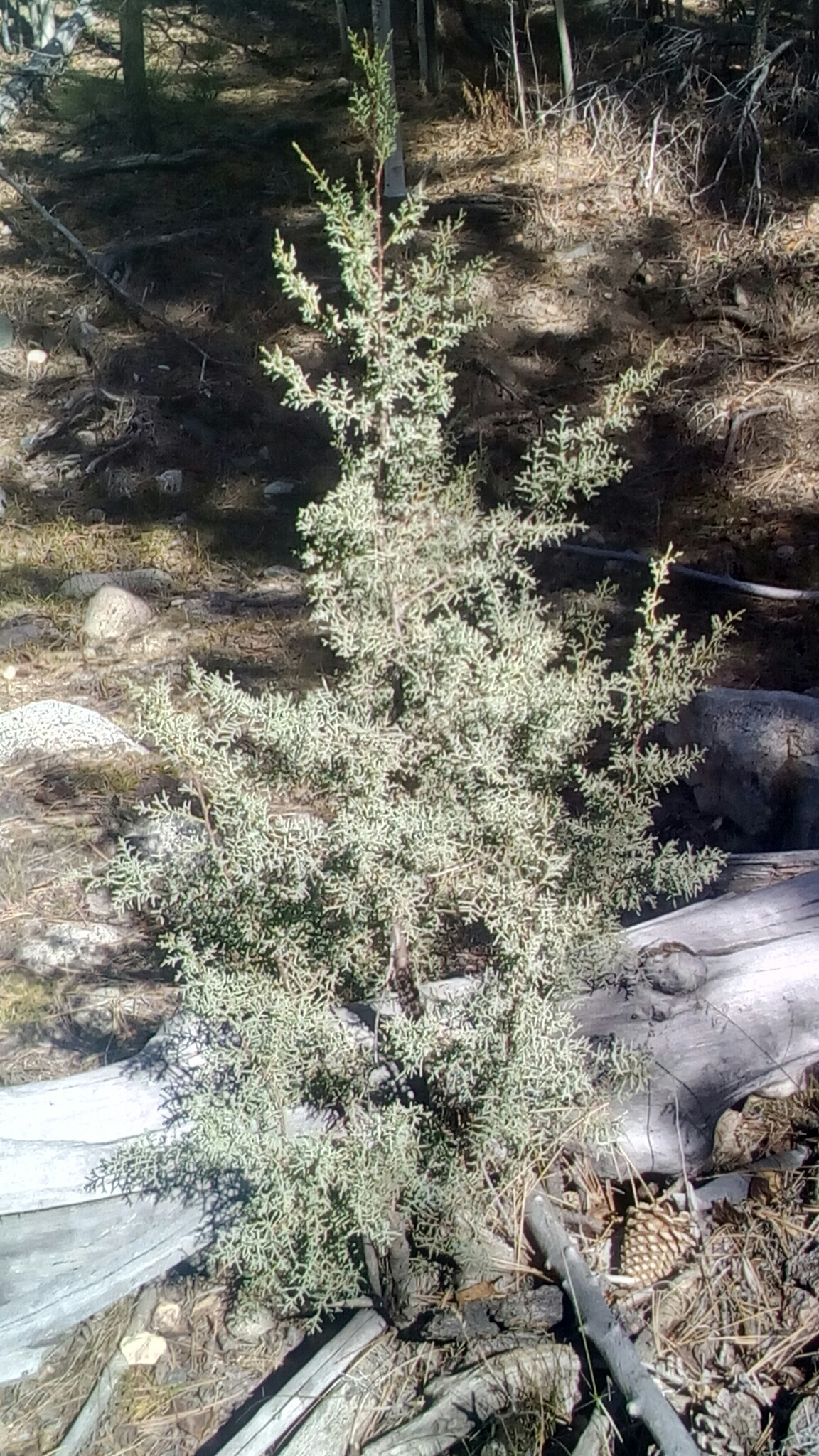
- Hesperocyparis montana young tree

Conservation status
- Critically Endangered (IUCN 3.1)

Scientific classification
- Kingdom: Plantae
- Clade: Tracheophytes
- Clade: Gymnosperms
- Division: Pinophyta
- Class: Pinopsida
- Order: Cupressales
- Family: Cupressaceae
- Genus: Hesperocyparis
- Species: H. montana

Binomial name
- Hesperocyparis montana (Wiggins) Bartel (2009)
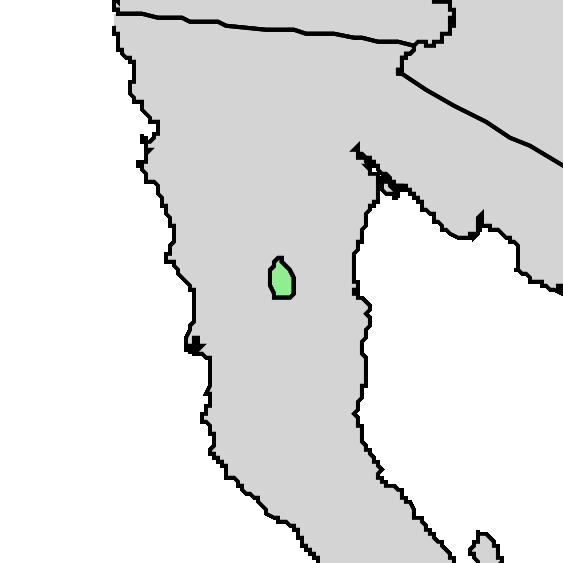
- Range of Hesperocyparis montana in Baja California

Synonyms
- Callitropsis montana (Wiggins) D.P.Little (2006); Cupressus arizonica subsp. montana (Wiggins) A.E.Murray (1985); Cupressus arizonica var. montana (Wiggins) Little (1966); Cupressus montana Wiggins (1933); Hesperocyparis arizonica var. montana (Wiggins) de Laub. (2012); Neocupressus arizonica var. montana (Wiggins) de Laub. (2009)

= Hesperocyparis montana =

Species of conifer

Hesperocyparis montana, the San Pedro Mártir cypress or San Pedro cypress, is a species of conifer in the cypress family, Cupressaceae. It is a tree native to the Sierra de San Pedro Mártir of Baja California state in northwestern Mexico.

== Description ==
Hesperocyparis montana is a tree that grows 5–20 meters in height. In exceptional cases the diameter of the trunk will reach one meter, but more typically will be 20–50 centimeters. The bark on the trunk has narrow ridges and comes off in strips and may be deep brown or red-brown in color. On younger specimens or on the branches the bark sheds large patches with smooth red-gray bark underneath. The bark of young twigs is gray.

Seed cones are globose or ovoid, up to 30 mm long and brown or gray-brown when mature. Cones open at maturity in October and release 60 to 70 seeds, which are tan-colored and 3-4(-5) × 3-4 mm.

== Habitat and conservation ==
The tree is confined to montane coniferous forests on steep slopes and in canyons from 1,900 to 2,520 meters elevation. It is often found with the trees white fir (Abies concolor), yellow pine (Pinus jeffreyi), sugar pine (Pinus lambertiana), and quaking aspen (Populus tremuloides).

Hesperocyparis montana is Critically Endangered, with fewer than 250 mature trees living in the wild. The principal threat to the species is uncontrolled livestock grazing which allows cattle to trample and eat seedlings, preventing the trees from reproducing.

== Taxonomy ==
Hesperocyparis montana was given its first scientific description as Cupressus montana by Ira Loren Wiggins (1899-1987) in 1933. Considerable taxonomic debate as to its status followed with many authors including Elbert Luther Little (1907-2004) and Albert Edward Murray (1935-) reducing it to a variety or subspecies of what was then classified as Cupressus arizonica. It continued after the reclassification of new world cypress species to Hesperocyparis in 2009 with David John de Laubenfels (1925-2016) arguing for its classification as a subspecies of Hesperocyparis arizonica.

The closest relatives of H. montana according to genetic analysis are Hesperocyparis forbesii and Hesperocyparis guadalupensis.

As of 2024 it is classified as a separate species by Plants of the World Online and World Flora Online.
