= Picacho del Diablo =

Mountain in Baja California, Mexico

- Cerro de la Encantada
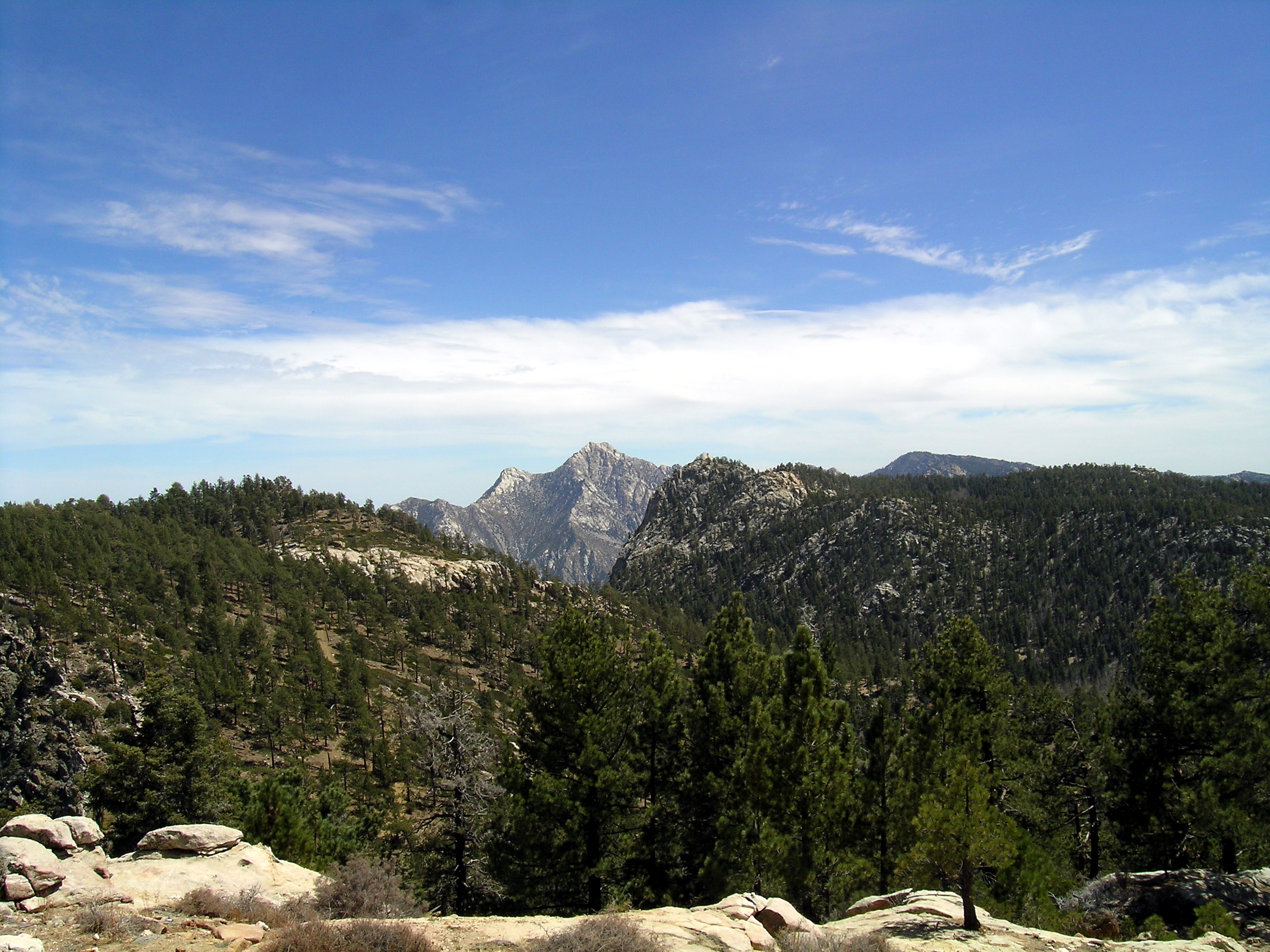
- Picacho del Diablo as seen from the National Astronomical Observatory of Mexico

Highest point
- Elevation: 3,096 m (10,157 ft)
- Prominence: 2,115 m (6,939 ft)
- Listing: North America prominent peaks 78th; North America isolated peaks 61st; DPS Emblem
- Coordinates: 30°59′27″N 115°22′30″W

Naming
- English translation: Devil's Peak
- Language of name: Spanish

Geography
- Location within Baja California Location within Mexico
- Location: Sierra de San Pedro Mártir National Park, Mexicali Municipality, Baja California, Mexico
- Parent range: Sierra San Pedro Mártir
- Topo map: H11B45 San Rafael

Climbing
- Easiest route: class 3 scramble

Picacho del Diablo ('Devil's Peak') is the highest peak on the Baja California peninsula, measuring 3,096 metres (10,157 ft). It is alternately called Cerro de la Encantada, meaning 'Hill of the Enchanted' or 'Hill of the Bewitched'. The peak is located in the Sierra de San Pedro Mártir, a part of the Peninsular Ranges in the Mexican state of Baja California.

== Climate ==
The peak has either a cold-summer Mediterranean climate (Csc) or a Mediterranean-influenced subarctic climate (Dsc)in the Köppen climate classification depending whether the threshold for those climates is considered 0°C or -3°C .

Climate data for Picacho del Diablo Peak (1961–1990)
Month	Jan	Feb	Mar	Apr	May	Jun	Jul	Aug	Sep	Oct	Nov	Dec	Year
Mean daily maximum °C (°F)	4.9 (40.8)	4.5 (40.1)	3.9 (39.0)	6.4 (43.5)	10.1 (50.2)	16.4 (61.5)	19.7 (67.5)	18.5 (65.3)	16.5 (61.7)	12.0 (53.6)	7.2 (45.0)	5.7 (42.3)	10.48 (50.86)
Daily mean °C (°F)	0.3 (32.5)	0.0 (32.0)	−0.9 (30.4)	0.8 (33.4)	4.2 (39.6)	9.5 (49.1)	13.0 (55.4)	12.1 (53.8)	10.3 (50.5)	6.6 (43.9)	2.2 (36.0)	1.1 (34.0)	4.9 (40.8)
Mean daily minimum °C (°F)	−4.3 (24.3)	−4.6 (23.7)	−5.8 (21.6)	−4.7 (23.5)	−1.8 (28.8)	2.6 (36.7)	6.4 (43.5)	5.6 (42.1)	4.0 (39.2)	1.3 (34.3)	−2.8 (27.0)	−3.5 (25.7)	−0.6 (30.9)
Average precipitation mm (inches)	189 (7.4)	144 (5.7)	169 (6.7)	11 (0.4)	9 (0.4)	3 (0.1)	61 (2.4)	55 (2.2)	50 (2.0)	20 (0.8)	59 (2.3)	80 (3.1)	850 (33.5)
Source: climatewna.com

== See also ==
- List of mountains in Mexico
- Mountain peaks of North America
- List of Ultras of Mexico
