= Gulf of California xeric scrub =

Xeric shrubland ecoregion of the Baja California Peninsula of Mexico

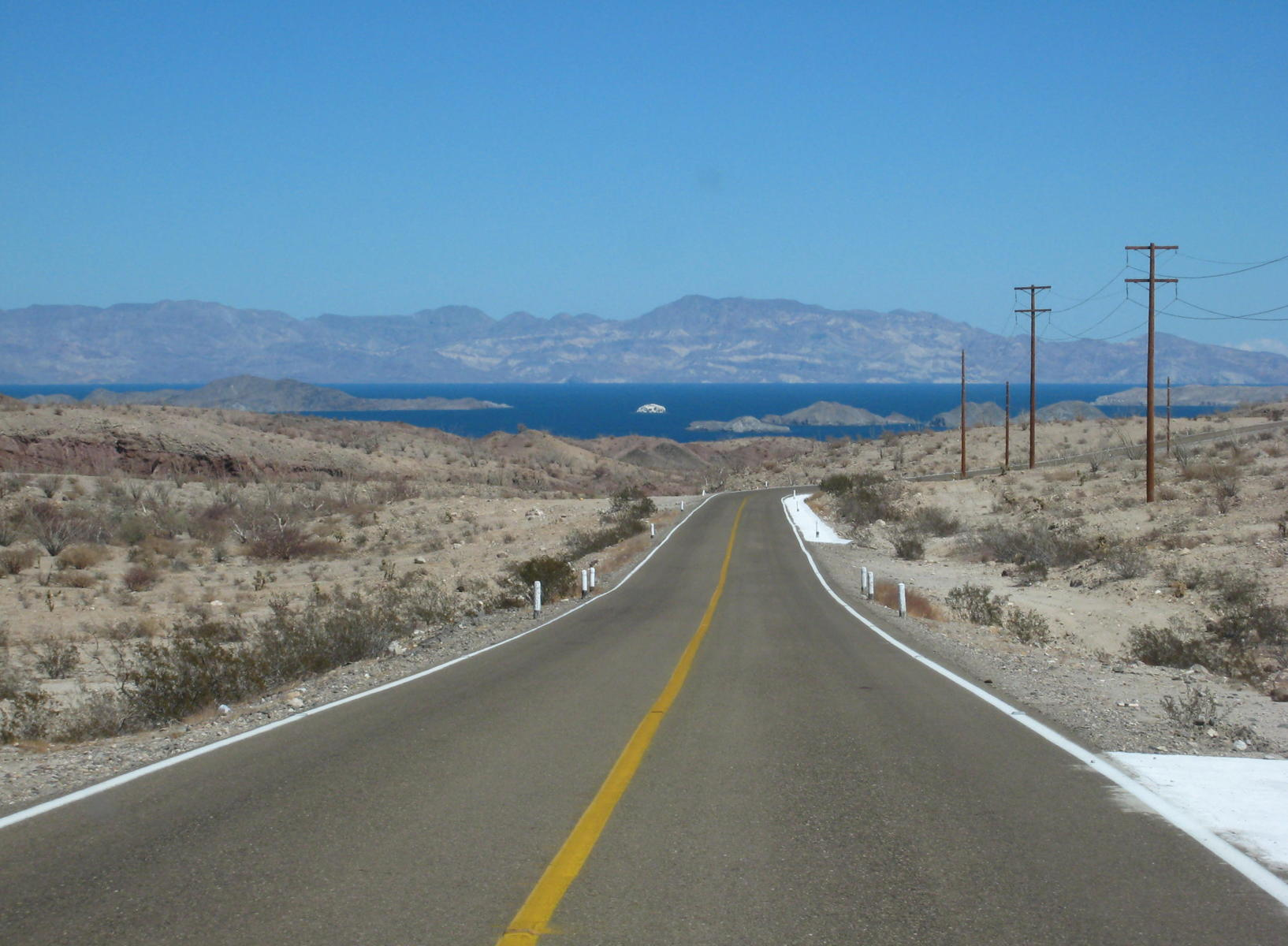
- Approaching Gulf of California at Bahía de los Ángeles

- Location of the Gulf of California xeric scrub

Ecology
- Realm: Nearctic
- Biome: Deserts and xeric shrublands
- Borders: Baja California desert; San Lucan xeric scrub, Sonoran Desert

Geography
- Area: 22,573 km^{2} (8,715 sq mi)
- Country: Mexico
- States: Baja California; Baja California Sur
- Climate type: Hot desert

Conservation
- Conservation status: Vulnerable
- Protected: 11,386 km² (50%)

The Gulf of California xeric scrub (Spanish: Matorral xerófilo del Golfo de California) is a xeric shrubland ecoregion of Mexico's Baja California Peninsula.

== Geography ==
The Gulf of California xeric scrub covers an area of 23,600 square kilometers (9,100 sq mi), lying on the eastern side of the peninsula along the Gulf of California. The Peninsular Ranges, including the Sierra de San Francisco and Sierra de la Giganta, run the length of the peninsula, separate the Gulf of California xeric scrub from the Baja California desert on Baja California's Pacific slope. The ecoregion extends from the gulf shore to the crest of the mountains, and includes several of the islands in the gulf, the largest of which are Isla Ángel de la Guarda, Isla del Carmen, and Isla San José. To the north, the Gulf of California xeric scrub transitions to the Sonoran Desert. At the southern end of the peninsula, the Gulf of California xeric scrub transitions to the San Lucan xeric scrub.

== Flora ==
Most of the ecoregion is covered in dry shrubland. The principal shrubs are creosote (Larrea tridentata) and desert burr sage (Ambrosia dumosa), with Jatropha cinerea, palo fierro (Olneya tesota), Acacia brandegeana, Cercidium floridum, and Pithecellobium undulatum.

Palm oases are found in stream valleys, and sustain a plant community that thrives with year-round moisture. The native palm Washingtonia robusta and introduced date palm (Phoenix dactylifera) are characteristic trees, along with the reeds Typha domingensis and Phragmites communis.

The ecoregion is home to 238 species of plants. 20 to 25% of the plant species are endemic to the ecoregion, and there are 20 endemic plant genera.

== Fauna ==
Large mammals include the desert bighorn (Ovis canadensis), mule deer (Odocoileus hemionus), and puma (Puma concolor). Threatened birds of the ecoregion include the masked bobwhite quail (Colinus virginianus ridewayi) and peninsular yellowthroat (Geothlypis beldingii). There are nine endemic reptile species.

== Protected areas ==
A 2017 assessment found that 11,386 km², or 50%, of the ecoregion is in protected areas. Valle de los Cirios Flora and Fauna Protection Area and El Vizcaíno Biosphere Reserve protect much of the northern and central portion of the ecoregion. The islands are protected by Gulf of California Islands Flora and Fauna Protection Area and Bahía de Loreto National Park. Two of the oases - Oasis Sierra de La Giganta in the center, and Oasis de la Sierra El Pilar in the south - are Ramsar sites.

== See also ==
- List of ecoregions in Mexico
