= Baja California desert =

Desert ecoregion of the Baja California Peninsula of Mexico

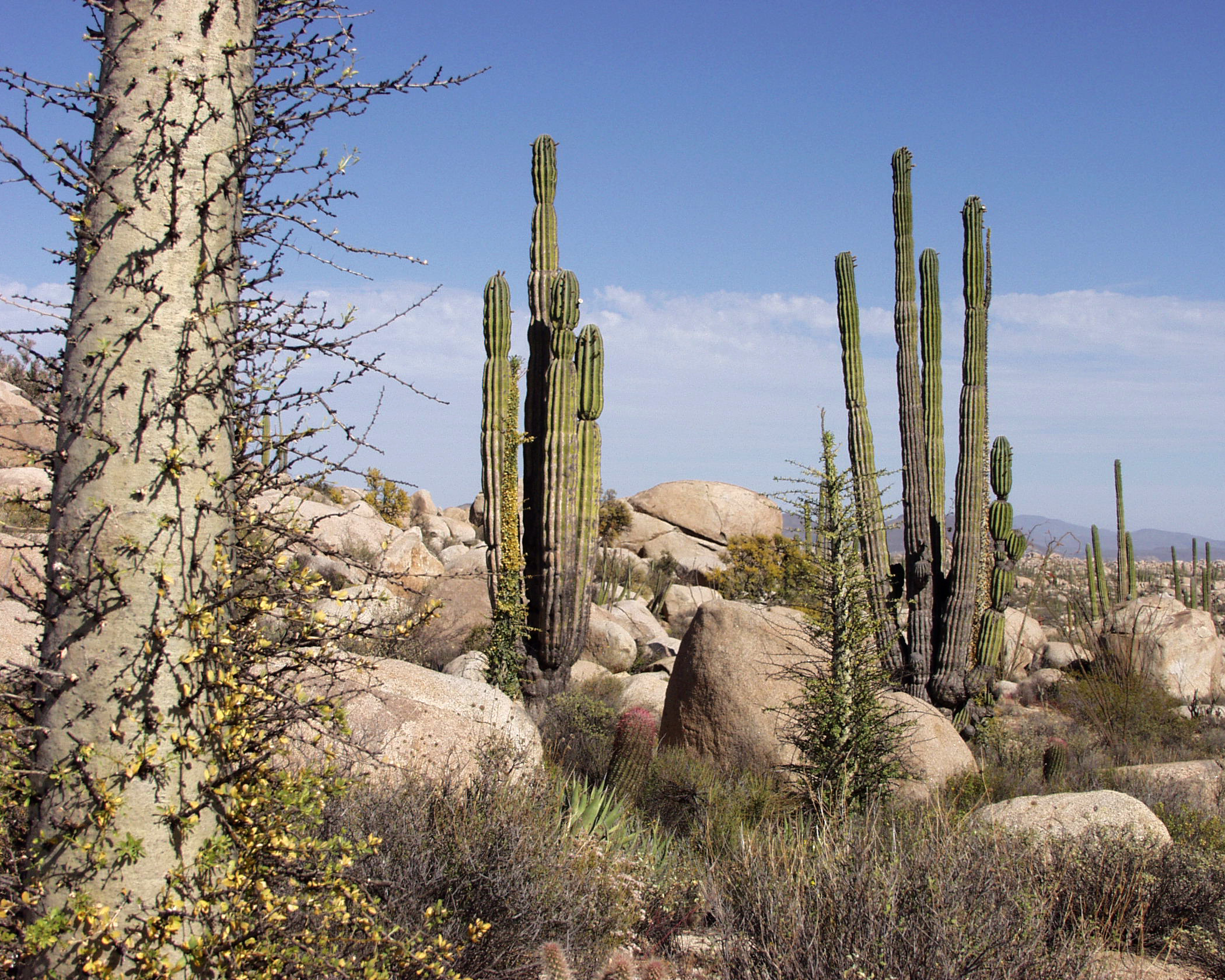
- Baja California desert near Cataviña

- Location of the Baja California desert

Ecology
- Realm: Nearctic
- Biome: Deserts and xeric shrublands
- Borders: California coastal sage and chaparral; Gulf of California xeric scrub; Sierra Juárez and San Pedro Mártir pine–oak forests, Sonoran Desert

Geography
- Area: 76,296 km^{2} (29,458 sq mi)
- Country: Mexico
- States: Baja California; Baja California Sur

Conservation
- Conservation status: Relatively stable/intact
- Global 200: Yes
- Protected: 45,940 km^{2} (60%)

The Baja California desert (Spanish: desierto de Baja California) is a desert ecoregion of Mexico's Baja California peninsula. This ecoregion occupies the western portion of the Baja California peninsula, and occupies most of the Mexican states of Baja California Sur and Baja California. It covers 77,700 square kilometers (30,000 square miles). The climate is dry, but its proximity of the Pacific Ocean provides humidity and moderates the temperature. The flora mostly consists of xeric shrubs and over 500 species of recorded vascular plants.

== Geography ==
The Baja California desert ecoregion lies on the western portion of the Baja California peninsula and occupies most of the Mexican states of Baja California and Baja California Sur. The ecoregion covers 77,700 square kilometers (30,000 square miles) and includes most of the Peninsula's western slope. It is bounded on the west by the Pacific Ocean and on the east by the Peninsular Ranges, and extends from approximately 31º to 24º north. Elevations vary, and include mountain ranges on the western central part (1,000 to 1,500 metres or 3,300 to 4,900 feet), plains of middle elevation (300 to 600 metres or 1,000 to 2,000 feet), and vast extensions of coastal dunes.

North of 30° north latitude on the Pacific slope, the Baja California desert transitions to the California coastal sage and chaparral. The Sierra Juárez and San Pedro Mártir pine–oak forests occupy the higher Peninsular Ranges to the north, where a number of tree species are found including the near-threatened California fan palm. The Sonoran Desert lies to the northeast. The Gulf of California xeric scrub lies east of the Peninsular Ranges and to the south.

== Climate ==
The climate is dry and mostly subtropical with the southernmost parts being tropical. Although rainfall is low, the Pacific Ocean provides some humidity and moderates the temperature compared to the Sonoran Desert, which lies on the east slope of the Peninsular Ranges.

== Flora ==
The ecoregion is mostly covered by xeric shrubs, which create varying associations based on elevation and soil conditions. The ecoregion has close to 500 species of vascular plants, of which a number are endemic, for example the Boojum tree (Fouquieria columnaris) or creeping devil(Stenocereus eruca).

== Fauna ==
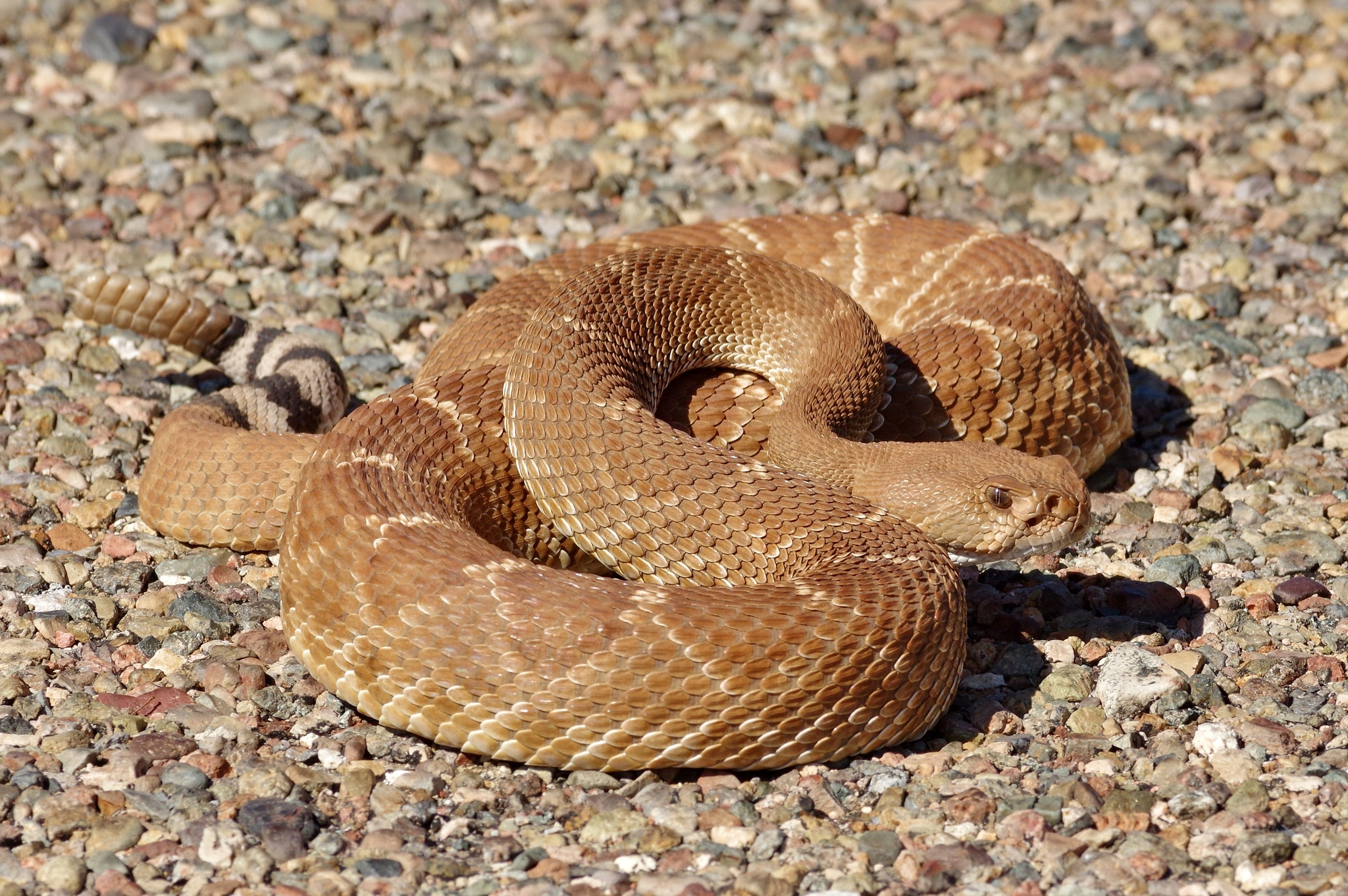
Red diamond rattlesnake (Crotalus ruber), a common reptile native to the desert

The ecoregion has about 50 species of mammals. Large mammals include mule deer (Odocoileus hemionus), desert bighorn sheep (Ovis canadensis nelsoni), puma (Puma concolor), and the critically endangered Baja California pronghorn (Antilocapra americana peninsularis). The San Quintin kangaroo rat (Dipodomys gravipes) and Baja California rock squirrel (Otospermophilus atricapillus) are endemic to the ecoregion.

There are about 200 native bird species, including golden eagle (Aguila chrysaetos), peregrine falcon (Falco peregrinus), crested caracara (Caracara cheriway), osprey (Pandion haliaeutus), and burrowing owl (Athene cunicularia). Millions of ducks and geese over-winter in the coastal lagoons, including Ojo de Liebre Lagoon, San Ignacio Lagoon, and Magdalena Bay.

== Protected areas ==
A 2017 assessment found that 45,940 kilometers squared, or 60 percent, of the ecoregion is in protected areas. Protected areas include El Vizcaíno Biosphere Reserve and Valle de los Cirios Flora and Fauna Protection Area; both protected areas extend into the adjacent Gulf of California xeric scrub ecoregion.

== See also ==
- List of ecoregions in Mexico
