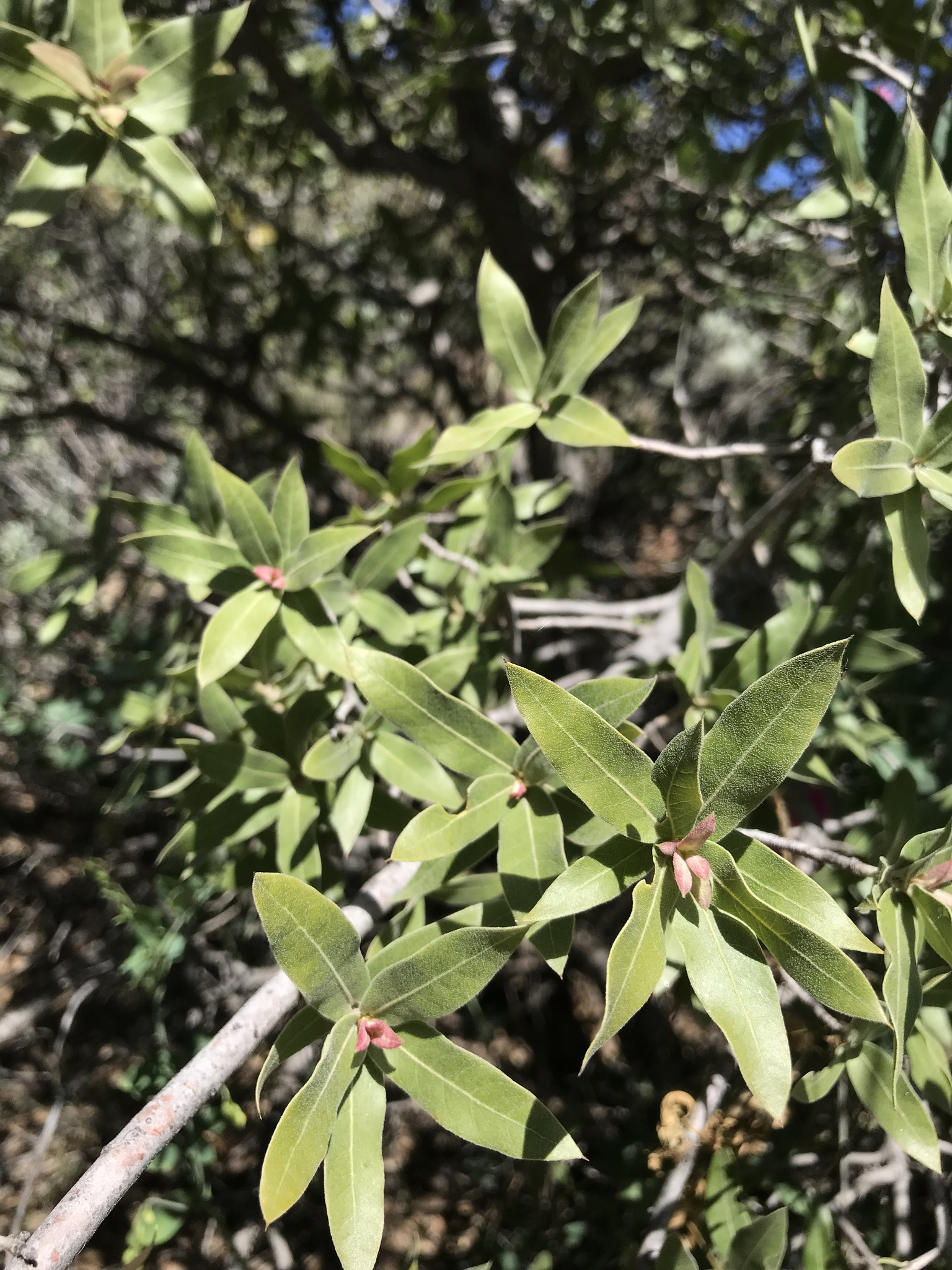

Conservation status
- Near Threatened (IUCN 3.1)

Scientific classification
- Kingdom: Plantae
- Clade: Embryophytes
- Clade: Tracheophytes
- Clade: Spermatophytes
- Clade: Angiosperms
- Clade: Eudicots
- Clade: Rosids
- Order: Fagales
- Family: Fagaceae
- Genus: Quercus
- Subgenus: Quercus subg. Quercus
- Section: Quercus sect. Lobatae
- Species: Q. peninsularis

Binomial name
- Quercus peninsularis Trel.

= Quercus peninsularis =

Species of oak tree

Quercus peninsularis, common name peninsular oak, is a species of oak endemic to Baja California, Mexico. It is a shrub or small tree to 10 m, occurring in mountain valleys and canyons up to 3000 m. It is placed in section Lobatae. Leaves are 5–8 cm, flat, leathery and hairy, with pointed tips and 2–5 pairs of teeth. Flowers occur in 3 cm catkins. Fruits are 1.5 cm acorns, stemless, ovoid, with hairy cupules, maturing in a year. Mature bark is reddish; young twigs are thin and hairy.
