= Sierra de la Laguna dry forests =

Ecoregion in Mexico

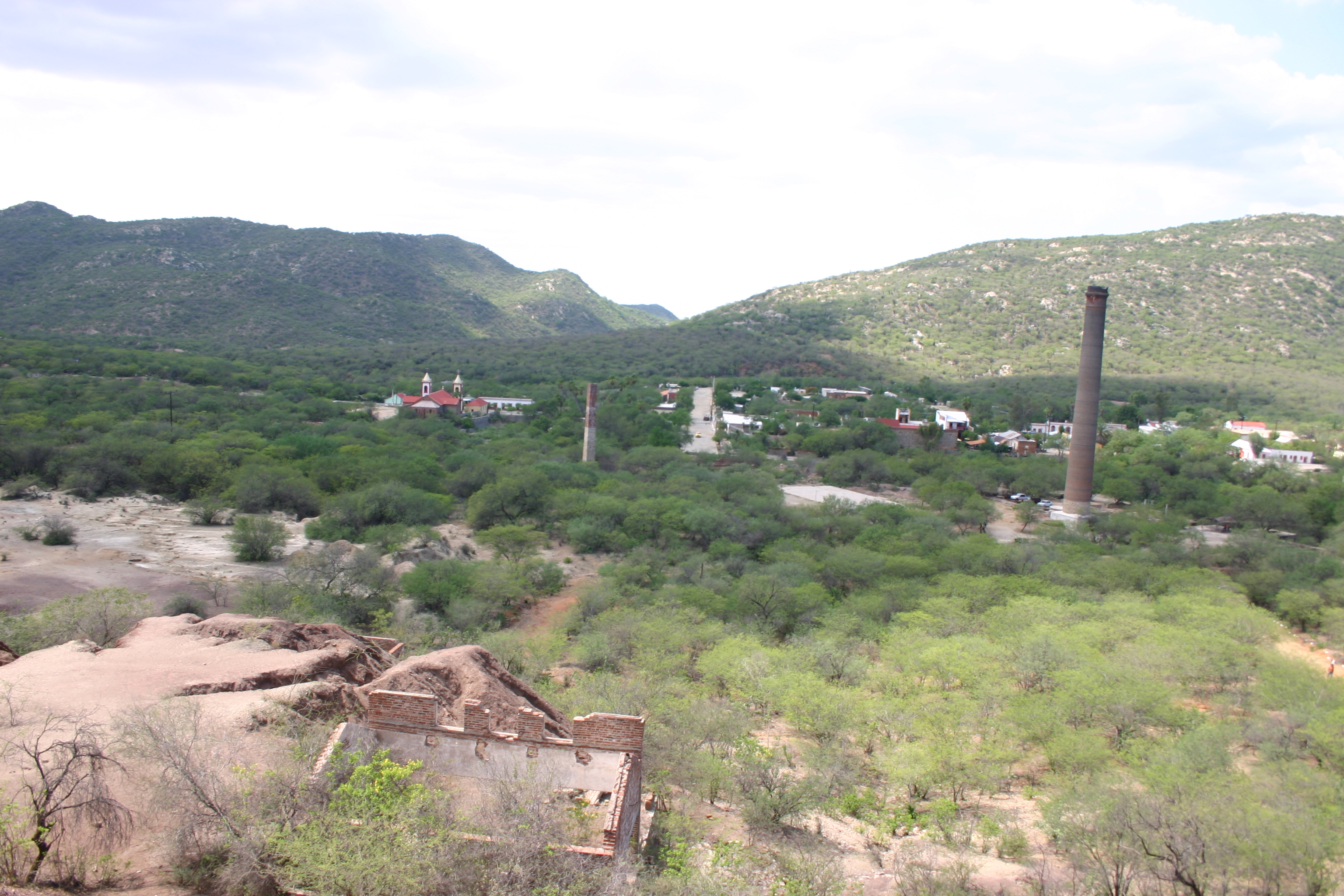
- El Triunfo, Baja California Sur

- location of the Sierra de la Laguna dry forests ecoregion

Ecology
- Realm: Neotropical
- Biome: tropical and subtropical dry broadleaf forests
- Borders: San Lucan xeric scrub; Sierra de la Laguna pine-oak forests

Geography
- Area: 3,968 km^{2} (1,532 mi^{2})
- Country: Mexico
- States: Baja California Sur

Conservation
- Conservation status: Vulnerable
- Global 200: Mexican dry forests
- Protected: 839 km^{2} (21%)

The Sierra de la Laguna dry forests are a subtropical dry forest ecoregion of the southern Baja California Peninsula in Mexico.

== Geography ==
The dry forests cover the lower elevations of the Sierra de la Laguna, from 250 to 800 m (820 to 2,620 ft) elevation. They are surrounded at lower elevations by the San Lucan xeric scrub, which lies between sea level and 250 m (820 ft) elevation. Above 800 meters elevation, the dry forests transition to the subhumid and temperate Sierra de la Laguna pine-oak forests.

== Climate ==
The ecoregion has a warm and dry subtropical climate. Annual precipitation is generally less than 500 mm. The highest-rainfall months are late summer, from August to October, with peak annual precipitation in September.

== Flora ==
The characteristic vegetation is dry forest, composed of low trees and shrubs with an herbaceous understory. Many of the trees are deciduous, dropping their leaves during the dry season. The predominant tree species of the dry forests are the mauto (Lysiloma divaricatum), palo blanco (L. candidum), cajalosucho (Bursera microphylla) and palo zorrillo (Hesperalbizia occidentalis).

Herbaceous plants are less prominent and include caribe (Cnidoscolus angustidens), buena mujer (Chloracantha spinosa), Solanum spp., and biznaga (Ferocactus spp).

The endemic palm here is Brahea brandegeei, that occurs in washes and along streams.

== Fauna ==
Bats in the ecoregion include the peninsular myotis (Myotis peninsularis), found only in the southern Baja Peninsula, and the Mexican long-tongued bat (Choeronycteris mexicana) and lesser long-nosed bat (Leptonycteris yerbabuenae), which are important pollinators for some desert plants.

Other native animals include the peninsular mule deer (Odocoileus hemionus peninsulae), white-tailed antelope squirrel (Ammospermophilus leucurus), acorn woodpecker (Melanerpes formicivorus), red-spotted toad (Anaxyrus punctatus), and Baja California chorus frog (Pseudacris hypochondriaca).

Dalquest's pocket mouse (Chaetodipus dalquesti), the Baja California slider (Trachemys nebulosa), and the Cape arboreal spiny lizard (Sceloporus licki) are restricted to the southern Baja California Peninsula. The San Lucan gecko (Phyllodactylus unctus) is restricted to the southern peninsula and adjacent islands in the gulf.

== Protected areas ==
A 2017 assessment found that 839 km^{2}, or 21%, of the ecoregion is in protected areas. Protected areas in the ecoregion include the Sierra de la Laguna Biosphere Reserve.

== See also ==
- List of ecoregions in Mexico
- Natural history of Baja California Sur
- Tropical and subtropical dry broadleaf forests
