= San Lucan xeric scrub =

Xeric shrubland eoregion of Baja California Sur, Mexico

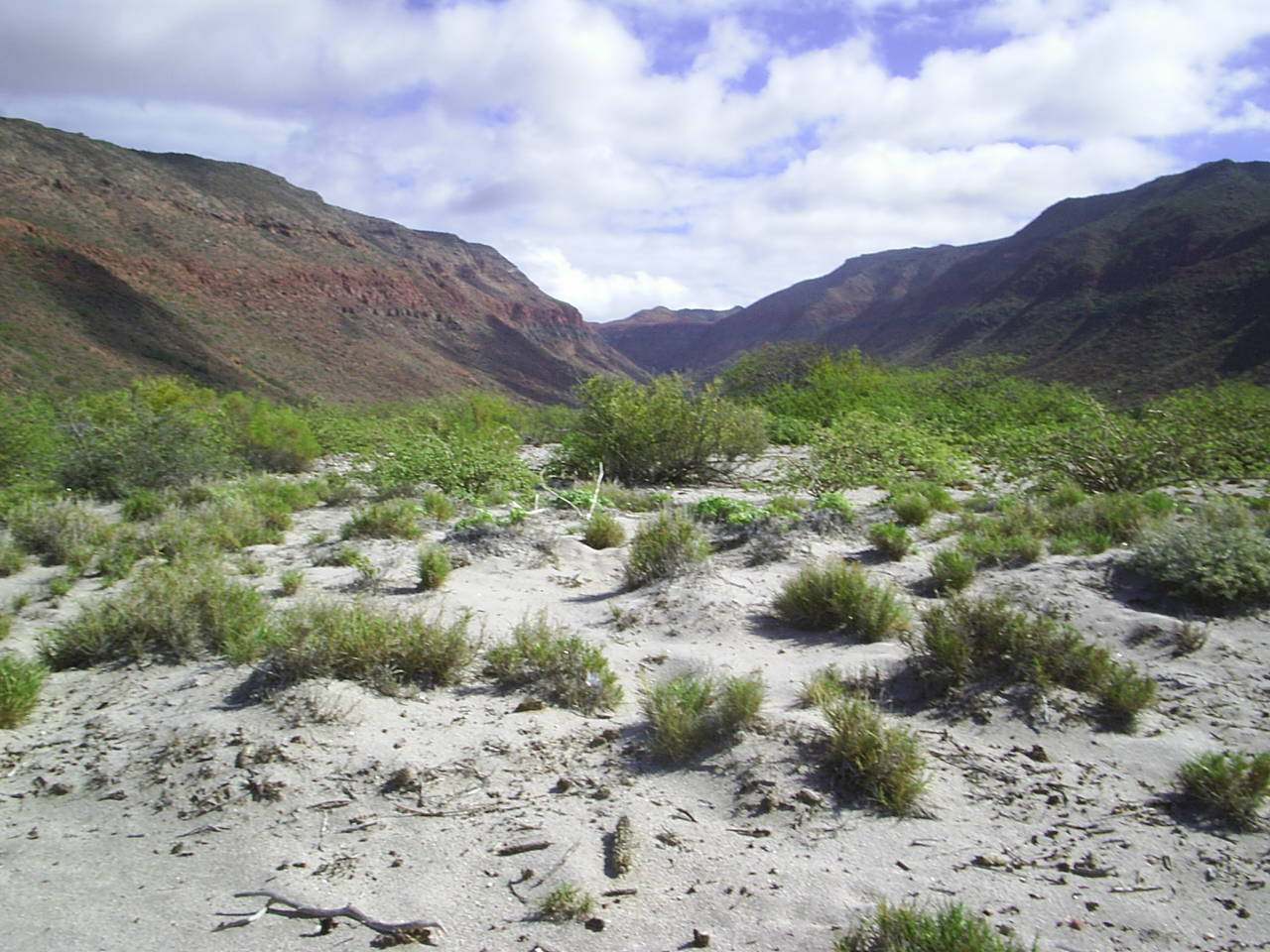
- Isla Espíritu Santo, in Baja California Sur, Mexico

- Location of the San Lucan xeric scrub ecoregion

Ecology
- Realm: Neotropical
- Biome: deserts and xeric shrublands
- Borders: Gulf of California xeric scrub; Sierra de la Laguna dry forests

Geography
- Area: 3,685 km^{2} (1,423 mi^{2})
- Country: Mexico
- States: Baja California Sur

Conservation
- Conservation status: Vulnerable
- Protected: 568 km² (15%)

The San Lucan xeric scrub is a xeric shrubland ecoregion of the southernmost Baja California Peninsula, in Los Cabos Municipality and eastern La Paz Municipality of southern Baja California Sur state, Mexico.

== Geography ==
The San Lucan xeric scrub covers an area of 3,900 square kilometers (1,500 sq mi). It extends to the sea on the west, south, and east, and up to 250 metres (820 ft) elevation in the Sierra de la Laguna, where the Sierra de la Laguna dry forests ecoregion begins. Above that to the range's summits is the Sierra de la Laguna pine-oak forests ecoregion. The ecoregion includes Jacques Cousteau Island (aka Cerralvo Island), Espíritu Santo Island, and Partida Island in the Gulf of California. It is bounded on the north by the Gulf of California xeric scrub ecoregion.

The cities of Cabo San Lucas and San José del Cabo are on the southern coast. The city of La Paz lies at the northern edge of the ecoregion.

== Climate ==
The ecoregion has a tropical desert climate (Köppen: BWh). Annual rainfall averages about 400mm. August through October are the rainiest months.

== Flora ==
The predominant vegetation is dry shrubland. Common plants include the small trees Bursera microphylla and Lysiloma divaricatum, along with yuccas and the cactus Cylindropuntia cholla, Stenocereus thurberi, and Ferocactus spp. Herbaceous plants include Cnidoscolus angustidens, Plantago linearis, Bouteloua hirsuta, and Commelina tuberosa.

The San José oasis is a coastal wetland near San Jose del Cabo. The oasis is watered by groundwater and the Río San José, intermittent stream, and is home to marshlands and flooded savannas dominated by the palm Washingtonia robusta, together with Brahea brandegeei, Populus brandegeei var glabra, Prunus serotina, Ilex brandegeeana, Heteromeles arbutifolia, and Salix lasiolepis.

== Fauna ==
Bats in the ecoregion include the peninsular myotis (Myotis peninsularis), found only in the southern Baja Peninsula, and the Mexican long-tongued bat (Choeronycteris mexicana) and lesser long-nosed bat (Leptonycteris yerbabuenae), which are important pollinators for some desert plants.

Other native animals include the peninsular mule deer (Odocoileus hemionus peninsulae), White-tailed antelope squirrel (Ammospermophilus leucurus), Acorn woodpecker (Melanerpes formicivorus), red-spotted toad (Anaxyrus punctatus), and Baja California chorus frog (Pseudacris hypochondriaca).

Dalquest's pocket mouse (Chaetodipus dalquesti), Xantus's hummingbird (Basilinna xantusii), the Baja California slider (Trachemys nebulosa), and the Cape arboreal spiny lizard (Sceloporus licki) are restricted to the southern Baja California Peninsula. The San Lucan gecko (Phyllodactylus unctus) is restricted to the southern peninsula and adjacent islands in the gulf.

The Espíritu Santo antelope squirrel (Ammospermophilus insularis) is found only on Espíritu Santo Island. The Cerralvo Island whiptail (Aspidoscelis ceralbensis) and Isla Cerralvo snake (Sonora savagei) are restricted to Jacques Cousteau Island.

== Protected areas ==
A 2017 assessment found that 568 km², or 15%, of the ecoregion is in protected areas. Sierra de la Laguna Biosphere Reserve protects a portion of the ecoregion east of Todos Santos. Jacques Cousteau, Espíritu Santo, and Partidas islands are part of the Gulf of California Islands Flora and Fauna Protection Area. Balandra Flora and Fauna Protection Area lies along the Gulf of California coast north of La Paz. The Sistema Ripario de la Cuenca y Estero de San José del Cabo is a Ramsar site of 124,219 ha, which includes the San José oasis north of San José del Cabo and its watershed. Cabo Pulmo National Park protects a portion of the eastern shoreline and offshore reefs.

== See also ==
- List of ecoregions in Mexico
