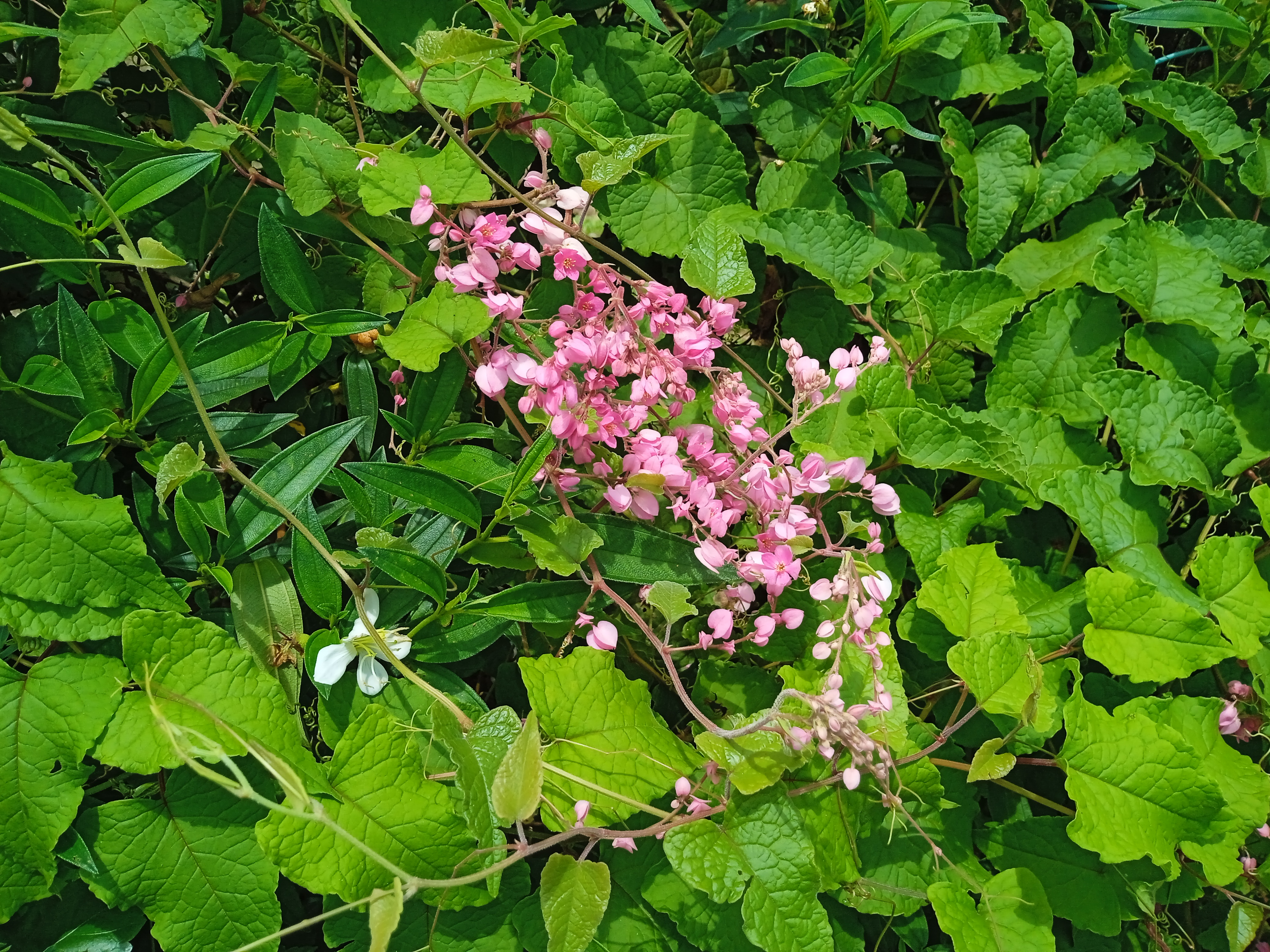

Scientific classification
- Kingdom: Plantae
- Clade: Tracheophytes
- Clade: Angiosperms
- Clade: Eudicots
- Order: Caryophyllales
- Family: Polygonaceae
- Genus: Antigonon
- Species: A. leptopus

Binomial name
- Antigonon leptopus Hook. & Arn.

Synonyms
- Antigonon amabie K.Koch; Antigonon cinerascens M.Martens & Galeotti; Antigonon cordatum M.Martens & Galeotti; Antigonon platypus Hook. & Arn.; Corculum leptopus Stuntz

= Antigonon leptopus =

Species of flowering plant

Antigonon leptopus is a species of perennial vine in the buckwheat family commonly known as coral vine or queen's wreath. This clambering vine is characterized by showy, usually pink flowers that can bloom throughout the year and large, heart-shaped leaves. A. leptopus is native to the Pacific and Atlantic coastal plains of Mexico, but also occurs as a roadside weed from Mexico south to Central America. It is widely introduced and invasive throughout tropical regions of the world, including in the south and eastern United States, the West Indies, South America, and the Old World tropics of Asia and Africa. This species is utilized for its edible tubers and seeds, but also for its horticultural properties as an ornamental vine in warmer parts of the world.

== Description ==
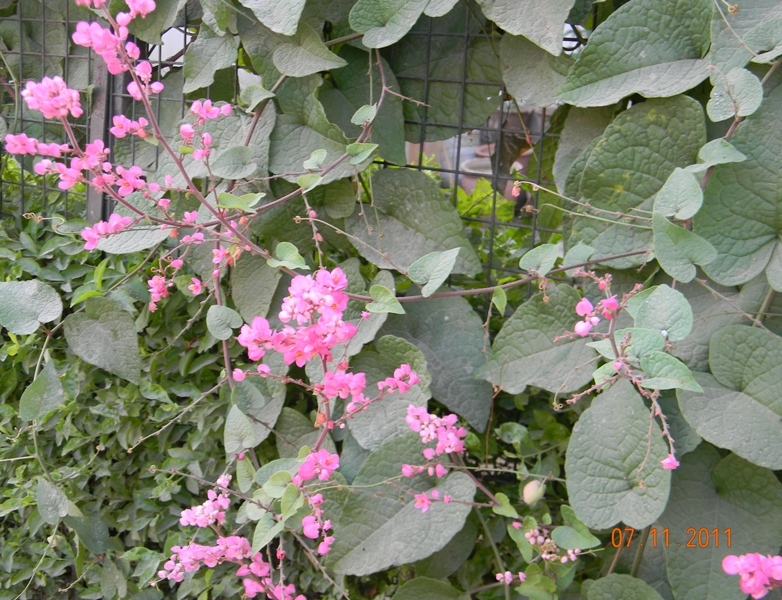
Habit

Antigonon leptopus is a fast-growing climbing vine that holds on via tendrils, and is able to reach over 7 metres in length. It has cordate (heart-shaped), sometimes triangular leaves 25 to 75 mm long. The flowers are borne in panicles, clustered along the rachis. Producing pink or white flowers from spring to autumn, it forms underground tubers and large rootstocks. It is a prolific seed producer. The seeds float on water. The fruit and seeds are eaten and spread by a wide range of animals such as pigs, racoons and birds. The tubers will resprout if the plant is cut back or damaged by frost.

=== Nomenclature ===
This species has a wide variety of common names. Some of them include:

- Chamorro: cadena de amor, flores kádena.
- English: bride's tears, coral vine, Confederate vine, chain-of-love, hearts on a chain, Mexican creeper, mountain-rose coralvine, queen's wreath, queen's-jewels.
- Filipino: cadena de amor;
- French: liane antigone, liane corail, rosa-de-montana.
- Malay: air mata pengantin, bertih
- Palauan: dilngau
- Pohnpeian: rohsenpoak suwed
- Portuguese: amor agarradinho;
- Spanish: bellísima, colación, confite, confitillo, corallita, corona, coronilla, flor de San Diego, San Miguel, San Miguelito.
- Tongan: 'ufi
- Vietnam: Tigon, hoa Ti Gôn

== Distribution and habitat ==
=== Native ===
Antigonon leptopus is native to the Atlantic and Pacific coastal plains of Mexico. On the Pacific coast, this species is found in the north from the Sierra de la Giganta in Baja California Sur, the Gulf of California islands and northern Sonora. On the Atlantic Coast, this species is found in the north in Tamaulipas. Its range extends south and inland from the Pacific side to Jalisco, becoming more sporadic through Guerrero and Michoacán, on the Atlantic side through Veracruz, with both sides of the range converging in central Oaxaca.

This species occupies a variety of habitats, but prefers sandy soils and is intolerant of shade. In Baja California Sur, this species primarily occurs naturally in washes, arroyos, and on hilly slopes. The vine clambers over cacti and trees, and overwhelms shrubs and rocks. A. leptopus inhabits a number of different environments on the peninsula, from the islands and desert on the Gulf Coast, the Magdalena Plains, the Sierra de la Giganta, the Sierra de la Laguna, and the xeric scrubby lowlands of the Cape. It is also present as a native roadside weed and ornamental for fencerows, and can be seen prominently along Mexican Federal Highway 1 near the Sierra de la Giganta.

=== Non-native ===
Outside of its native range, Antigonon leptopus is a pantropical invasive particularly notable for destabilizing island ecosystems. It is present on all tropical continents and even on remote islands in the Pacific Ocean. Phylogenetic analysis of plants outside of the native range suggest that A. leptopus was introduced multiple times from different seed sources. Wide cultivation of the plant as an ornamental is usually the source of most introductions, although not all introductions are invasive, and some records of the plant represent persistent cultivated plants and not naturalized ones.

The preferred habitats of introduced A. leptopus includes disturbed areas, forest edges, roadsides, coral cliffs, limestone soils, along banks, and in waste places. It can tolerate full sun and partial shade, as well as poor soils. In the wet season, this species can completely outcompete and smother native vines and understory plants. In the dry season, it can tolerate drought by defoliating, which provides fuel for wildfires. Soil disturbance can spread the tubers, and the seeds can be dispersed easily because they float on water.

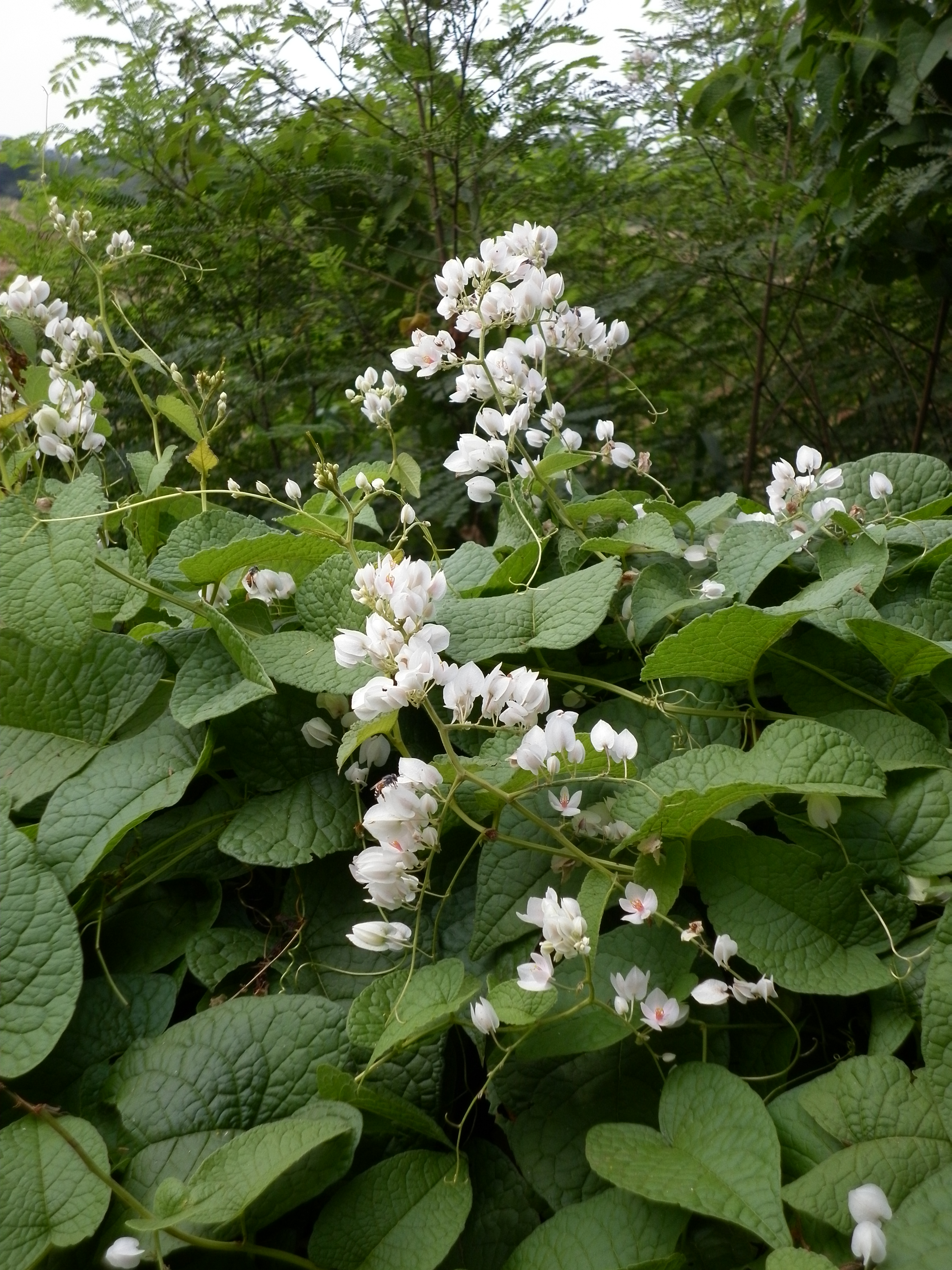
The form with white flowers

== Uses ==
Antigonon leptopus was prepared for consumption by the aboriginal inhabitants of Baja California Sur in a way reminiscent of preparing popcorn. The seeds were toasted by placing them in a flat basket made of flexible twigs which was torn into strips and woven to make a solid surface. On top of the seeds live coals were placed, and with both hands the basket was shaken so that the coals came up against the seeds, toasting them, but not burning the basket. When the toasting was finished, the burned-out coals were removed. Using this method, a major portion of the seeds burst open, exposing a white meal. Afterwards, the seeds were separated from the husks from which they had emerged by tossing them into the air with the basket, similar to the method used in winnowing wheat in Spain. The seeds were then ground and the resulting meal was eaten. Alternatively, the seeds could be boiled and made into fried cakes.

== Invasive species ==
This plant is listed as a category II invasive exotic by Florida's pest plant council.

Invasion of Antigonon leptopus on the Caribbean island of St. Eustatius significantly increased arthropod abundance and caused biotic homogenization. Specifically, uninvaded arthropod communities that were distinctly different in species composition between developed and natural sites became undistinguishable after A. leptopus invasion. Moreover, functional variables were significantly affected by species invasion. Invaded communities had higher community-weighted mean body size and the feeding guild composition of invaded arthropod communities was characterized by the exceptional numbers of nectarivores, herbivores, and detritivores. Taxa indicated as omnivorous (e.g., ants) that seem intrinsically generalistic appear to primarily suffer from A. leptopus invasion and may be particularly sensitive to the habitat structural effects of A. leptopus. Increased coverage of A. leptopus leads to a significant decrease in the abundance of predatory lizards of the genus Anolis.
