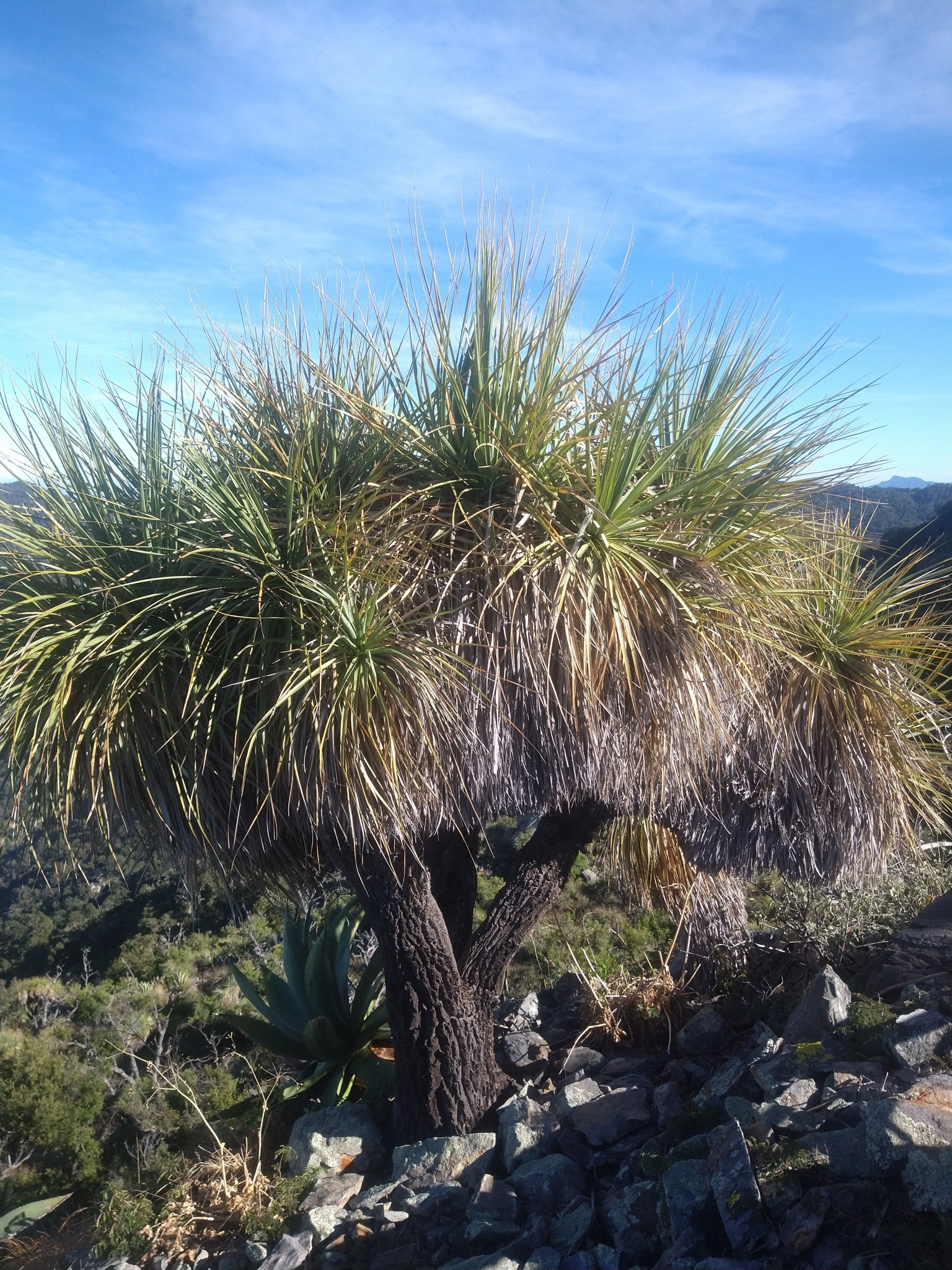

Conservation status
- Vulnerable (IUCN 3.1)

Scientific classification
- Kingdom: Plantae
- Clade: Tracheophytes
- Clade: Angiosperms
- Clade: Monocots
- Order: Asparagales
- Family: Asparagaceae
- Subfamily: Nolinoideae
- Genus: Nolina
- Species: N. beldingii

Binomial name
- Nolina beldingii Brandegee

Synonyms
- Dasylirion beldingii (Brandegee) Franceschi; Nolina beldingii var. deserticola Trel.

= Nolina beldingii =

Species of plant native to Mexico

Nolina beldingii is a species of perennial flowering plant in the family Asparagaceae known commonly as the Cape nolina or Belding's beargrass. It is an arborescent monocot growing up to 7 metres (23 ft) high, with fissured bark on a trunk topped with leaf rosettes. The narrow leaves are up to 1.15 m (3.8 ft) long, and are used as thatching by local peoples. This species is endemic to Baja California Sur in Mexico, where it grows only in the highest reaches of the Sierra de la Laguna. It is found primarily in oak forests at elevations over 1,000 m (3,300 ft) along rocky granite outcrops.

== Description ==
This is an arborescent species of Nolina that grows 5–7 m (16–23 ft) in height with a trunk 50 cm (20 in) in diameter. The bark is fissured, forming rectangular blocks 10 to 25 cm (3.9 to 9.8 in) long with the ridges 5 cm (2.0 in) deep. The bark is colored gray but turns maroon with age. Topping the apex of the trunk(s) are 1 to 26 rosettes of leaves, each rosette 1–3 m (3.3–9.8 ft) in diameter. The rosettes retain persistent old leaves along the trunks. The leaves themselves are long and narrow, linear in shape, 0.75–1.15 m (2.5–3.8 ft) long, and 1.4–2.0 cm (0.55–0.79 in) wide at the middle. The leaves are colored dark green and are smooth, sometimes becoming reddish towards the back. The tip of the leaf is smooth on the sides, but the margins on the rest of the leaf are dentate with small teeth, 0.2 mm (0.0079 in) long.

The inflorescence is paniculate, 2–3 m (6.6–9.8 ft) long and 20–70 cm (7.9–27.6 in) in diameter. The scape is 1 m (3.3 ft) tall, smooth, with linear-shaped bracts. The branches on the inflorescence are lax, loose, open, curved to undulate, and 23 cm (9.1 in) long, with branches towards the tip of the inflorescence 15 cm (5.9 in) long. The staminate flowers are shaped campanulate, 4–6 mm (0.16–0.24 in) in diameter on pedicels 2.5–3 mm (0.098–0.118 in) long. The pistillate flowers are also shaped campanulate, on pedicels 4–8 mm (0.16–0.31 in), colored light yellow to cream with a reddish midvein. The fruits are 1.4–1.5 cm (0.55–0.59 in) wide.

== Taxonomy ==
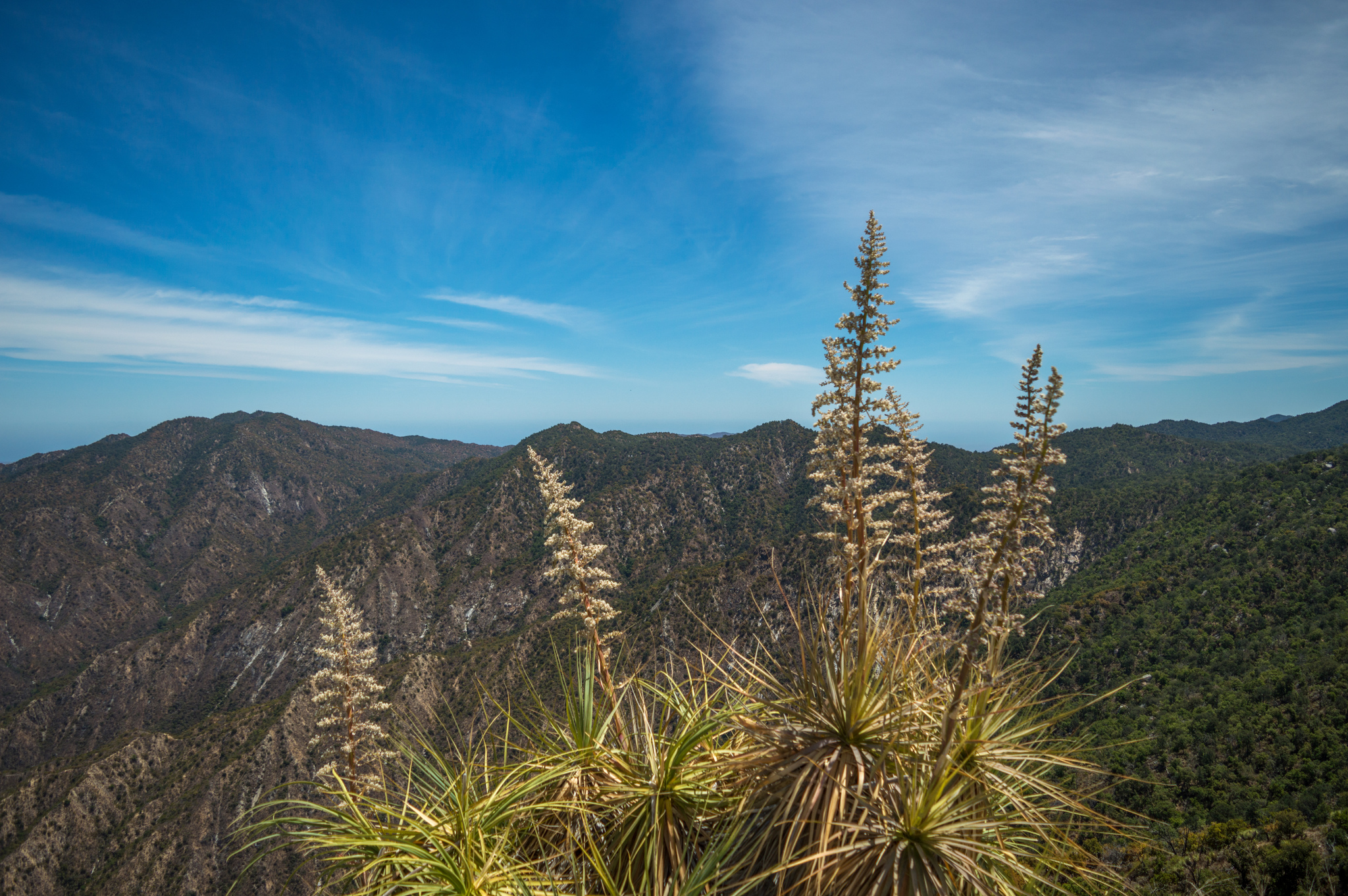
Inflorescences and rosettes, with the Sierra de la Laguna in the background

This species was first discovered to Western science by Lyman Belding, a naturalist who made several ornithological expeditions to the Sierra de la Laguna. Townshend Stith Brandegee made the species description in 1890 as Nolina beldingi, naming it after Belding, who gave Brandegee the directions to find the plant. Brandegee noted that a local species of wasp frequently nested in the plant, which almost ended his attempts to gather fruit on a precarious cliff-side specimen. He also compared the similarity of this species to the Dracaena planted ornamentally in San Francisco. Brandegee did not mention any type specimen in his description, meaning that a specimen collected in 1893 serves as the lectotype.

== Distribution and habitat ==
This species is endemic to the Sierra de la Laguna, a mountain range in the Cape region of Baja California Sur, Mexico. It grows on granitic outcrops at elevations from 1,000 m (3,300 ft) to 1,800 metres (5,900 ft), often in the highest reaches of the mountains. It is predominantly found on the steep slopes and cliffs of the local oak and pine forests, growing in association with Quercus tuberculata, Q. devia, Q. arizonica and Arbutus peninsularis. It is also found growing with the rare Dudleya rigida. Brandegee described this species as "the most striking part of the vegetation" amongst the oaks and pines.

== Uses ==
This leaves from this species are reportedly used as thatching by the local peoples. Members of the genus Nolina are also utilized by indigenous peoples to make mats, basketry, and hats. In parts of Arizona, New Mexico, Sonora and Chihuahua, the leaves of Nolina species are used to make brooms.
