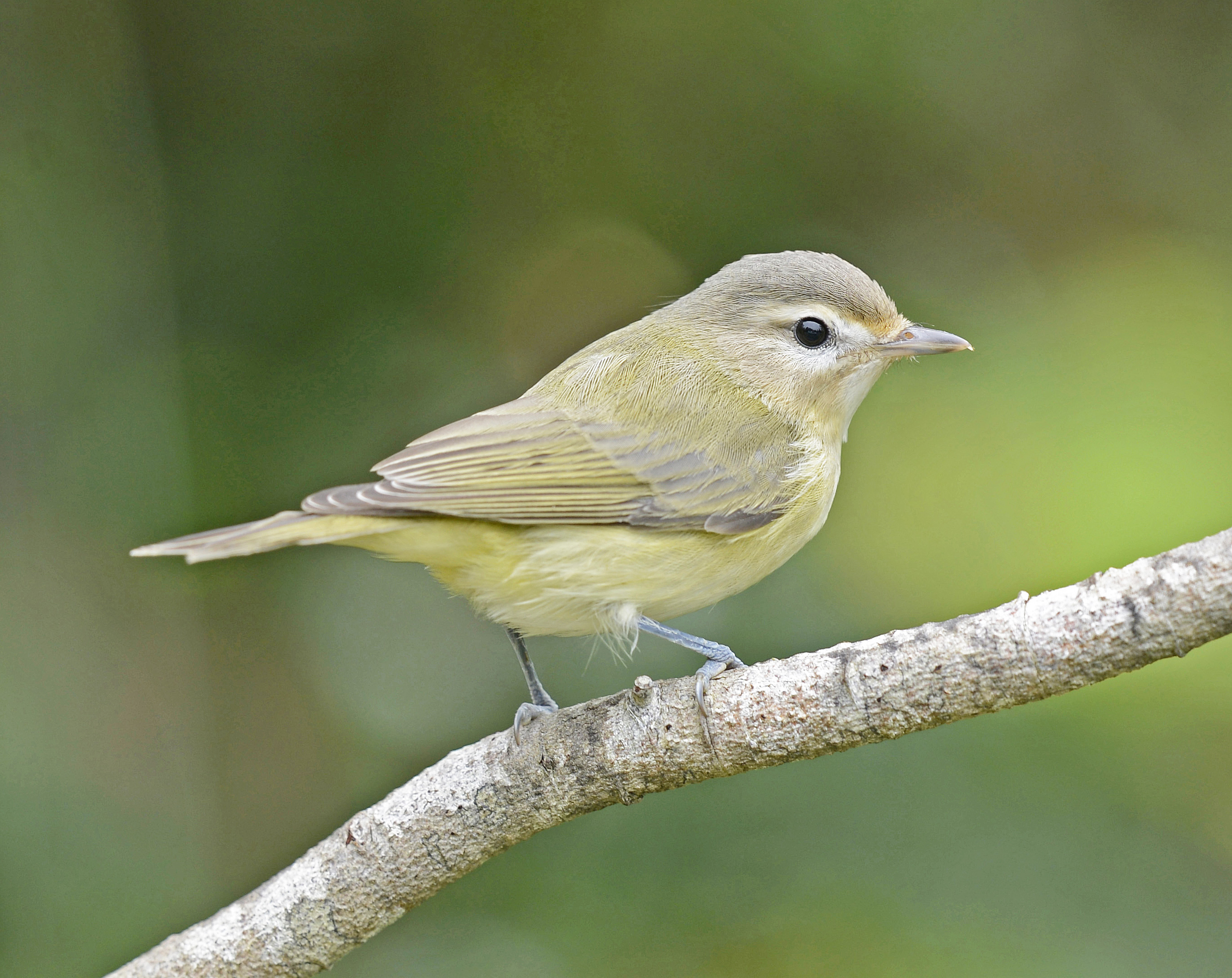
- Washington State

Conservation status
- Not evaluated (IUCN 3.1)

Scientific classification
- Kingdom: Animalia
- Phylum: Chordata
- Class: Aves
- Order: Passeriformes
- Family: Vireonidae
- Genus: Vireo
- Species: V. swainsoni

Binomial name
- Vireo swainsoni Baird, 1858
- Approximate distribution map Breeding range Non-breeding range Resident year-round

= Western warbling vireo =

Species of bird

The western warbling vireo (Vireo swainsoni) is a small North American songbird in the family Vireonidae. It was formerly considered to be a subspecies of the eastern warbling vireo (Vireo gilvus) and the two together were known as the warbling vireo.

== Taxonomy ==
The western warbling vireo was formally described in 1858 by the American naturalist Spencer Baird based on a specimen collected in Petaluma, California. He coined the current binomial name Vireo swainsonii where the specific epithet was chosen to honour the English zoologist William Swainson. Baird subsequently revised the spelling of the epithet to swainsoni.

The western warbling vireo and the eastern warbling vireo (Vireo gilvus) were formerly considered as conspecific. They were split by the American Ornithological Society in 2025 and by AviList in 2026 based on differences in morphology, genetics and vocalization.

Four subspecies are recognised:

- V. s. swainsoni Baird, 1858 – breeds from southeastern Alaska to northern Montana, and along Pacific coast to northern Baja California; winters in western Mexico
- V. s. brewsteri (Ridgway, 1903) – breeds from Montana and southern Idaho eastward to western South Dakota, southward to western Texas and south-central Mexico (Oaxaca); winters in south-central Mexico
- V. s. victoriae Sibley, 1940 – mountains of southern Baja California (Sierra de la Laguna)
- V. s. sympatricus (Phillips, 1991) – resident in south-central Mexico (Puebla)

== Description ==
The western warbling vireo is a small rather plain bird with a weight of 11–12 g (0.39–0.42 oz) and a length of 12–13 cm (4.7–5.1 in). The upperparts are grayish with a brown or olive tinge. The face has a broad pale supercilium that extends behind the eye. The underparts are pale gray with a variable yellow wash on the sides when the plumage is fresh. Males and females are similar.

It is very difficult to distiguish the western warbling vireo from the eastern warbling vireo in the field. On average western birds have a darker more slender bill, have paler olive-green in the dorsal plumage and have less yellow in the ventral plumage. Also, the pale supercilium of western birds tends to extend further back past the eye.

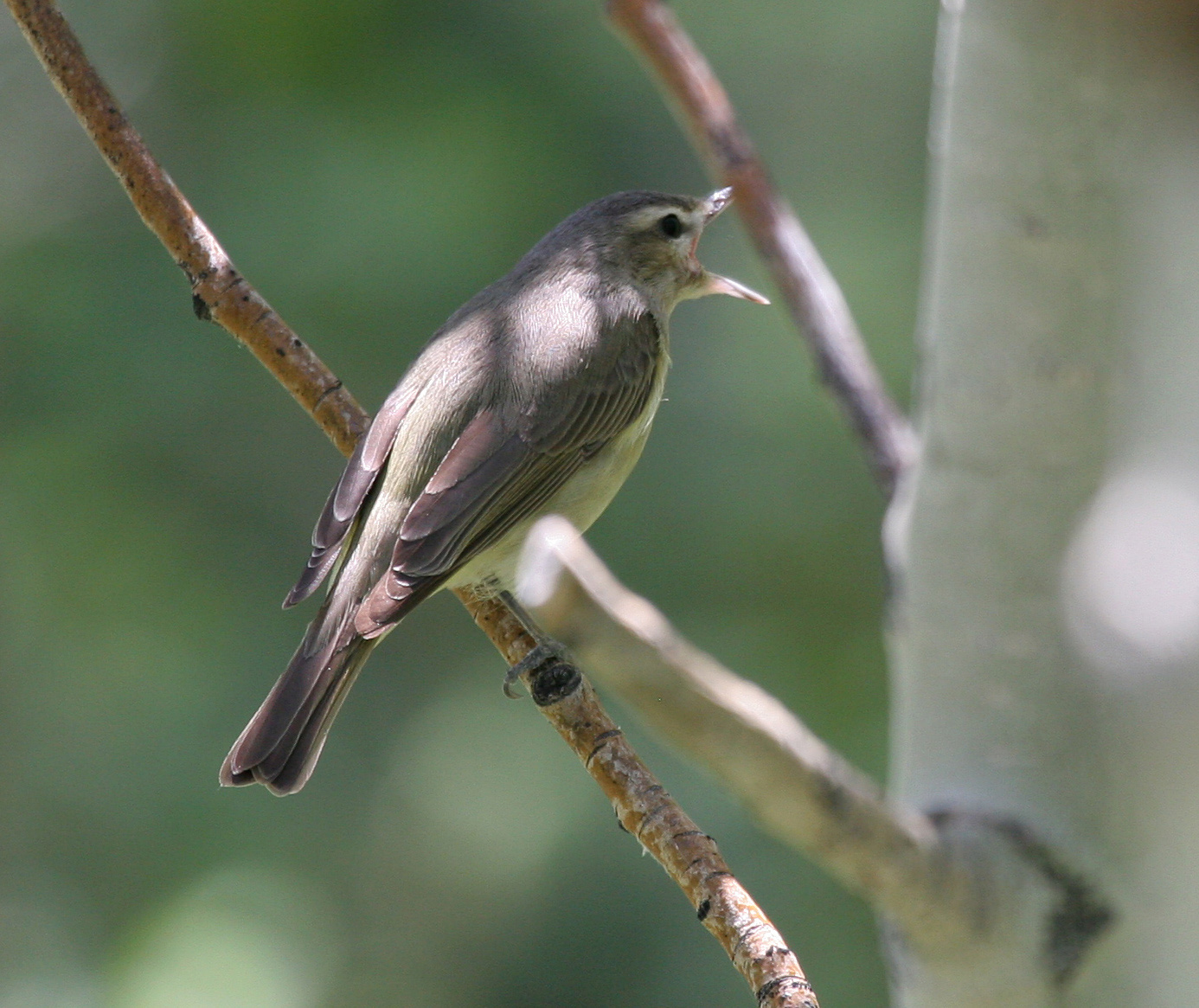
Vireo singing Ruby Mountains, Nevada

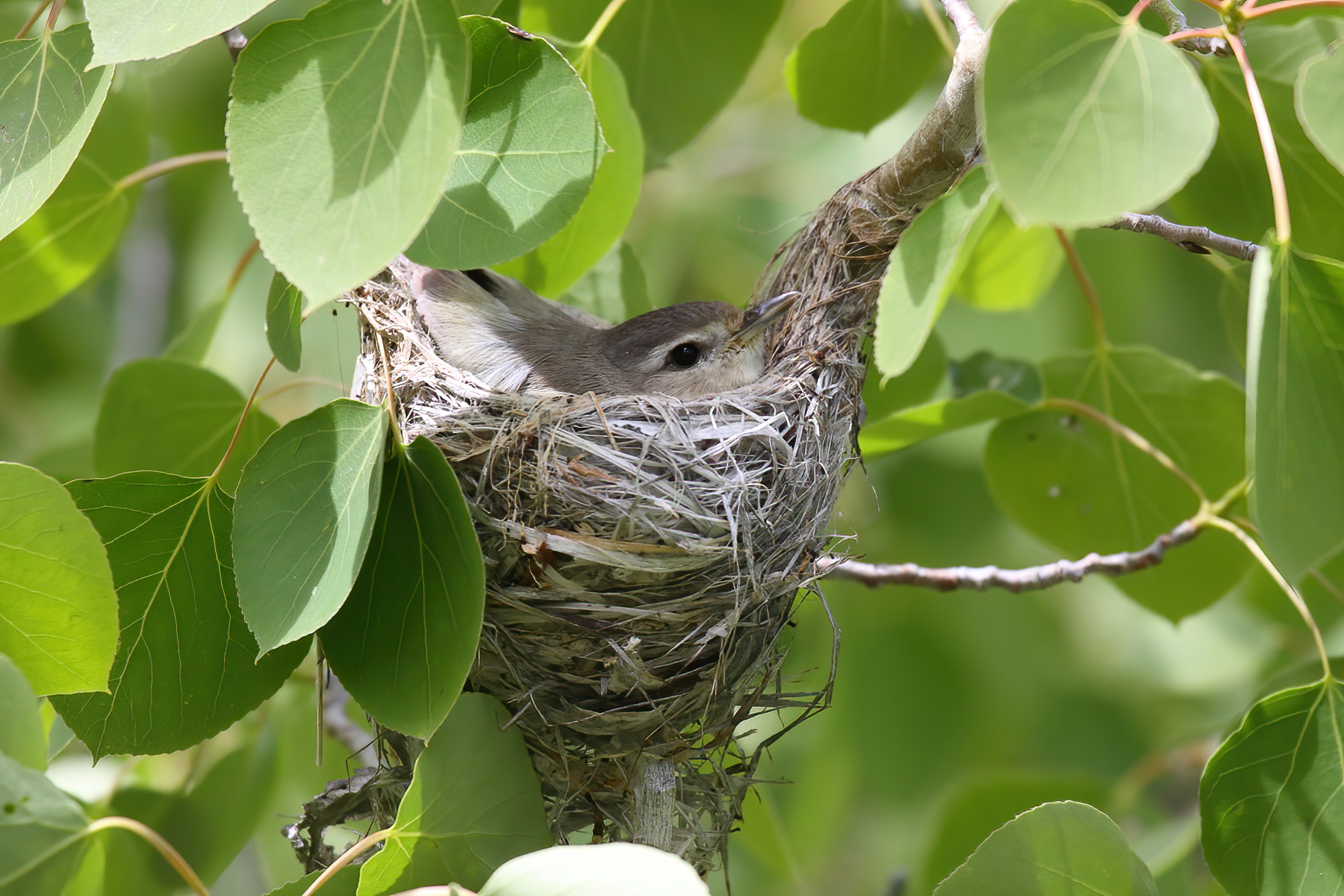
On nest, Ruby Mountains, Nevada
