= Madrean pine–oak woodlands =

Subtropical woodlands in the US and Mexico

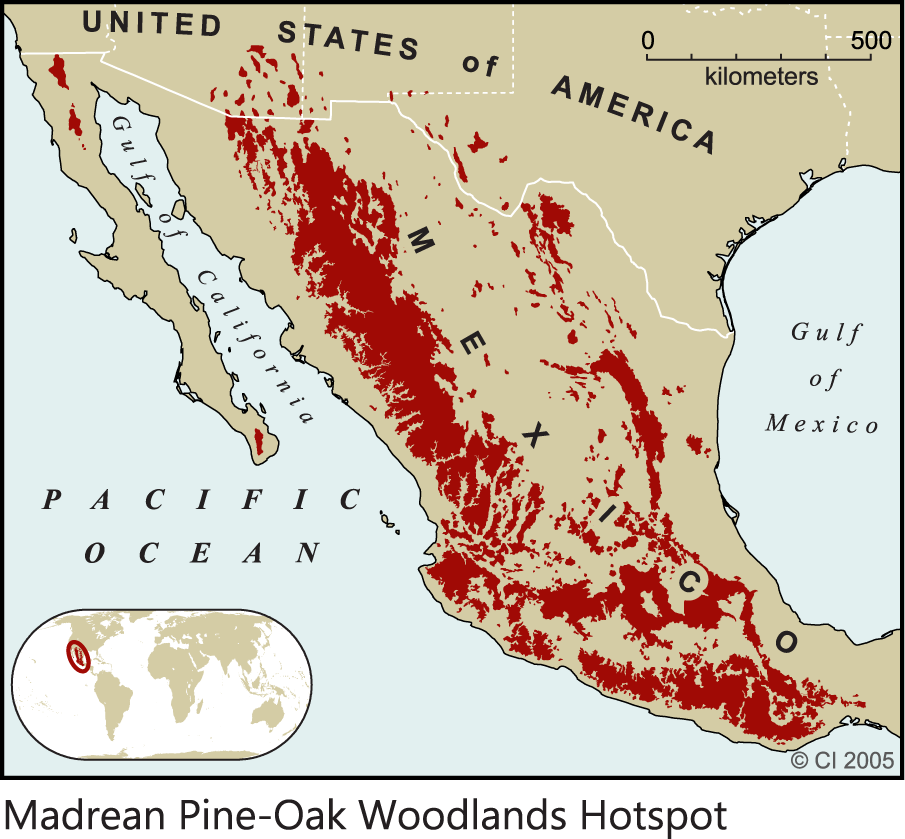
Distribution of Madrean pine–oak woodlands.

The Madrean pine–oak woodlands are subtropical woodlands found in the mountains of Mexico and the southwestern United States. They are a biogeographic region of the tropical and subtropical coniferous forests and temperate broadleaf and mixed forests biomes, located in North America.

Conservation International estimates the woodlands' original area at 461,265 km^{2}. The woodlands are surrounded at lower elevations by other ecoregions, mostly tropical and subtropical deserts and xeric shrublands, forests, and grasslands. Woodland areas were isolated from one another and from the pine–oak woodlands of the Sierra Madre Occidental to the south by the warming and drying of the climate since the 1st century CE.

== Distribution ==
=== Mexico ===
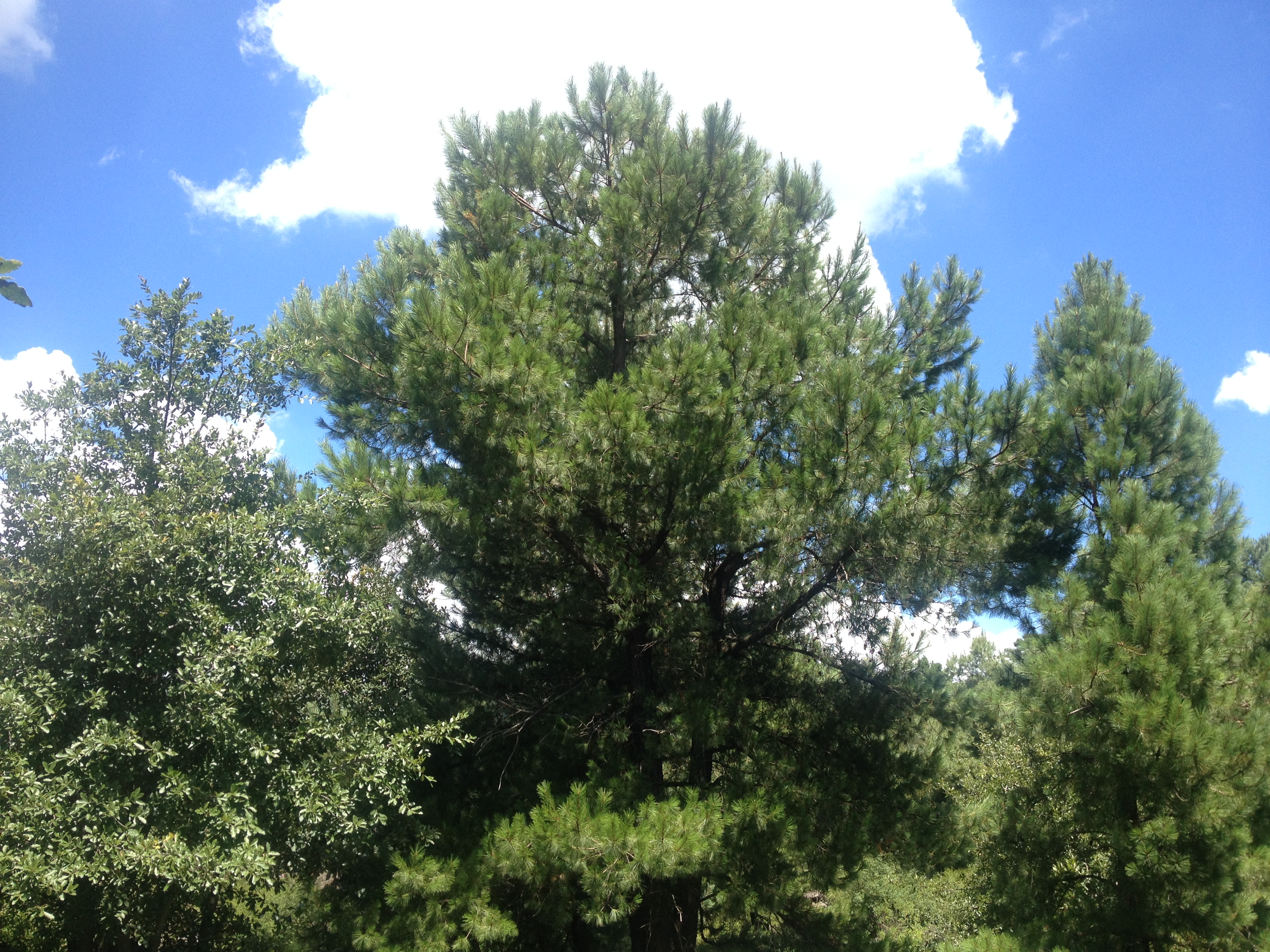
Pines and oaks coexist in the Nealtican Malpaís (Tianguismanalco, Puebla)

The Madrean pine–oak woodlands are found at higher elevations in Mexico's major mountain ranges, the Sierra Madre Occidental, the Sierra Madre Oriental, the Trans-Mexican Volcanic Belt, the Sierra Madre del Sur, the Sierra Madre de Oaxaca, the Peninsular Ranges of the Baja California Peninsula.

=== Madrean sky islands ===
There are also approximately 27 enclaves in southern Arizona and New Mexico and in western Texas, where they are known as the "Madrean sky islands". The major Madrean "sky island" ranges in Arizona are the Dragoon Mountains, Chiricahua Mountains, Pinaleño Mountains, Santa Catalina Mountains, Rincon Mountains, Santa Rita Mountains, and Tumacacori Highlands. In New Mexico, the Sacramento Mountains and Guadalupe Mountains, which extend into Texas, as well as the Davis Mountains and Chisos Mountains, are also forested Madrean sky islands.

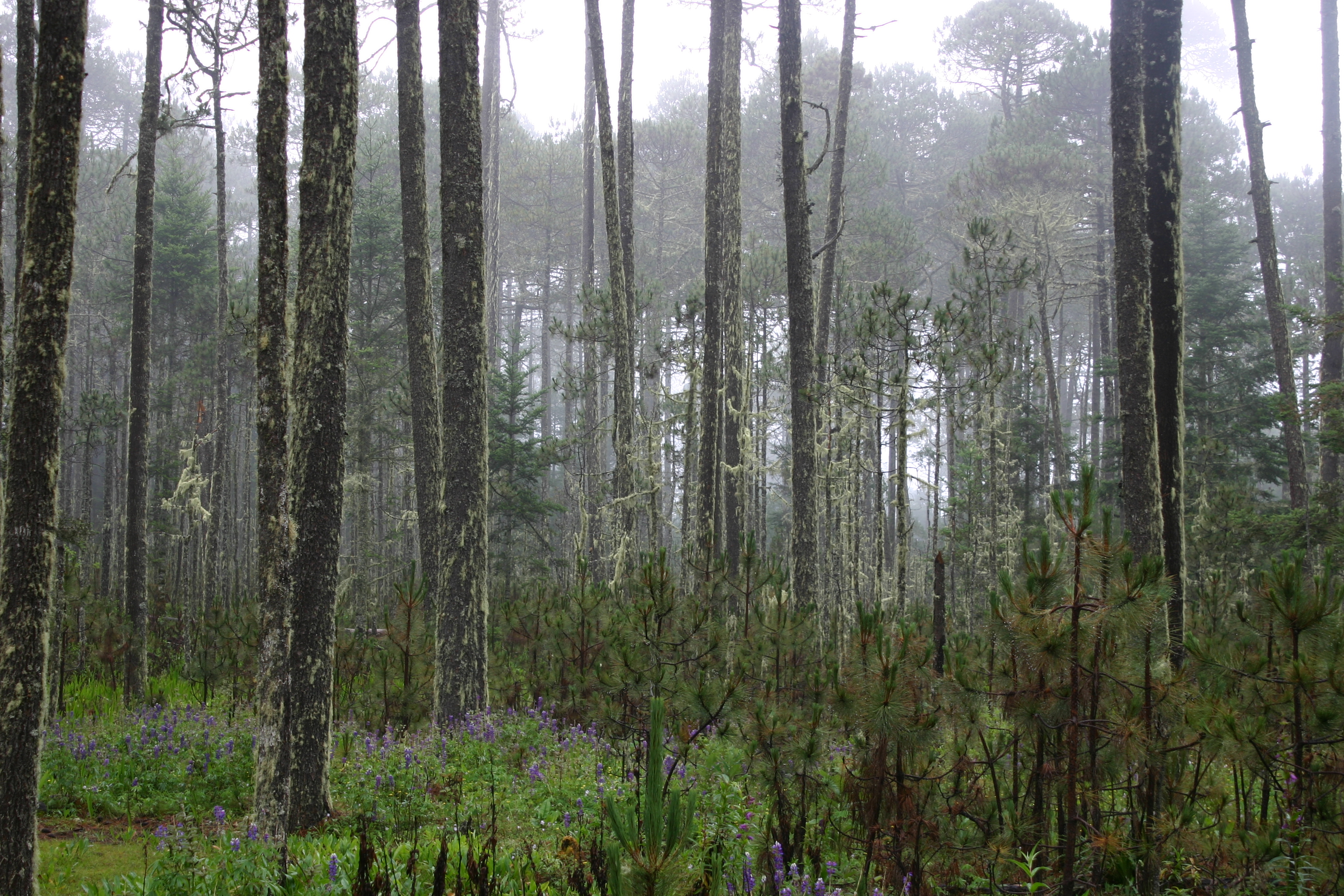
Madrean pine–oak woodlands in the Sierra Madre de Oaxaca, México.

== Flora ==
The pine–oak woodlands are composed of stands of oak (Quercus), pine (Pinus), douglas-fir (Pseudotsuga) and fir (Abies). The trees generally occur in mixed stands, though monospecific stands are sometimes found.

The pine–oak woodlands are home to one-quarter of Mexico's plant species, and Mexico is home to 44 of the 110 species of pine and over 135 species of oak, over 28% of the world's oak species.

Plant species descended from Madro-Tertiary flora, Madrean ancestor species, are an important element of the California chaparral and woodlands ecoregion.

== Madrean pine–oak woodlands ecoregions ==
The World Wildlife Fund recognizes several distinct Madrean pine–oak woodlands ecoregions, based on geographic distribution and species mix.
They include:

- Sierra Juárez and San Pedro Mártir pine–oak forests of the Sierra de Juárez and Sierra de San Pedro Mártir ranges of the northern Baja California peninsula.
- Sierra de la Laguna pine–oak forests of the Sierra de la Laguna in the southern Baja California peninsula.
- Sierra Madre Occidental pine–oak forests extend along the Sierra Madre Occidental range from the Rio Grande de Santiago in Mexico's Jalisco state through Nayarit, Sinaloa, Durango, Sonora, and Chihuahua, and include the Madrean Sky Islands of Arizona and New Mexico.
- Sierra Madre Oriental pine–oak forests extend along the Sierra Madre Oriental ranges of Texas and Mexico, from mountaintop enclaves in west Texas through Coahuila, Tamaulipas, Nuevo León, San Luis Potosí, Querétaro and Guanajuato.
- Trans-Mexican Volcanic Belt pine–oak forests
- Sierra Madre del Sur pine–oak forests
- Sierra Madre de Oaxaca pine–oak forests

== See also ==
- Conifers of Mexico
- Ecoregions of Mexico
