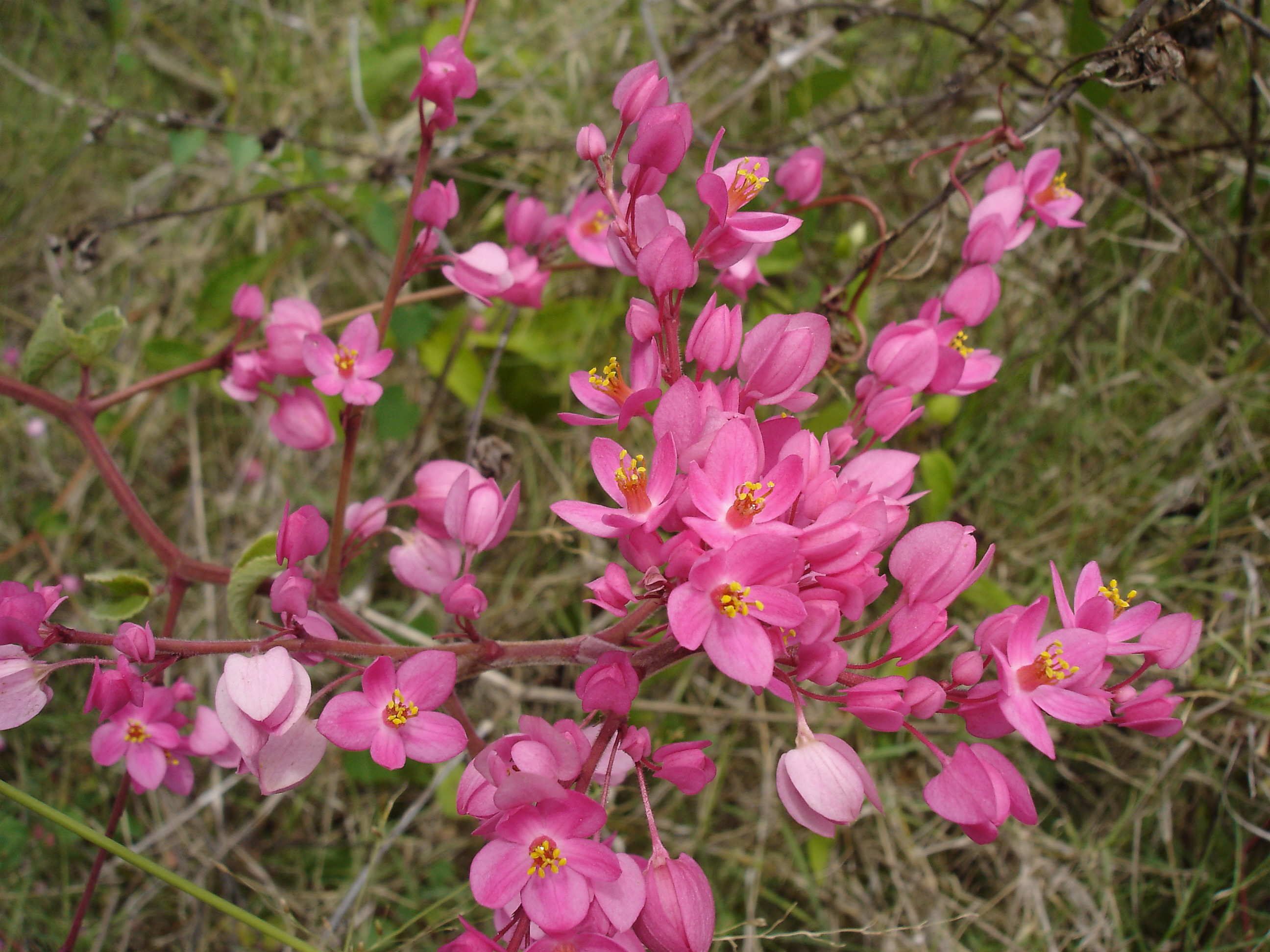
- Antigonon leptopus

Scientific classification
- Kingdom: Plantae
- Clade: Tracheophytes
- Clade: Angiosperms
- Clade: Eudicots
- Order: Caryophyllales
- Family: Polygonaceae
- Subfamily: Eriogonoideae
- Genus: Antigonon; Endl.

Species
- 3, see text

Synonyms
- Corculum Stuntz

= Antigonon =

Genus of flowering plants

Antigonon is a genus of flowering plants in the buckwheat family, Polygonaceae. It contains three species native to the Americas.

Antigonon are vines producing branching stems with tendrils from a tuberous root system. Their leaves are alternately arranged, with flowers borne in raceme-like clusters, often toward the ends of the stems. The bell-shaped flowers have five tepals usually in shades of pink or purplish, and sometimes yellowish or white. The stamens are joined at the bases, forming a tube.

Species include:

- Antigonon flavescens S.Watson – lovechain
- Antigonon guatimalense Meisn.
- Antigonon leptopus Hook. & Arn. – Confederate vine, Mexican coral vine, Mexican creeper, queen's wreath, queen's jewels, chain-of-love, mountain rose coral vine
