= Quercus tuberculata =

Conservation status
- Least Concern (IUCN 3.1)

Scientific classification
- Kingdom: Plantae
- Clade: Embryophytes
- Clade: Tracheophytes
- Clade: Spermatophytes
- Clade: Angiosperms
- Clade: Eudicots
- Clade: Rosids
- Order: Fagales
- Family: Fagaceae
- Genus: Quercus
- Subgenus: Quercus subg. Quercus
- Section: Quercus sect. Quercus
- Species: Q. tuberculata

Binomial name
- Quercus tuberculata Liebm.

Synonyms
- List: Quercus aurantiaca Trel.; Quercus idonea Goldman; Quercus monterreyensis Trel. & C.H.Müll.; Quercus standleyi Trel.; Quercus tuberculata f. latifolia Martínez

Species of oak tree

Quercus tuberculata is a species of oak tree which is native to mountains of northeastern and northwestern Mexico (Baja California Sur, Sonora, Chihuahua, Sinaloa, Michoacán, Durango, and Nuevo León). It is placed in Quercus section Quercus.

== Description ==
Quercus tuberculata is a deciduous tree up to 12 metres (39 feet) tall, with a trunk up to 30 centimetres (12 inches) in diameter. The leaves are egg-shaped, thick and leathery, up to 15 cm long, with wavy edges but no teeth or lobes.

== Range and habitat ==
Quercus tuberculata is native to northwestern Mexico, principally in the Sierra Madre Occidental of Sonora, Chihuahua, Sinaloa, Durango, and Nayarit states. It is also found in the Sierra de la Laguna of the southern Baja California Peninsula, in the northern Sierra Madre Oriental of Nuevo León, and in Michoacán in central Mexico.

The species inhabits oak and pine–oak forests and woodlands between 900 and 2000 meters elevation. It is typically found in areas where average annual rainfall is between 500 and 600 mm, and the average annual temperature is between 18 and 24 °C. It is commonly found on slopes between 30º and 40º, and near streams and other water sources. Q. tuberculata prefers slightly acidic soils low in organic matter and with a somewhat sandy texture. It is often a dominant species where it occurs.

The species has an estimated extent of occurrence (EOO) of 1,015,800 km^{2}, and an estimated area of occupancy (AOO) of 536 km^{2}. The species' population is generally stable, and it is abundant within its range. Its conservation status is assessed as Least Concern.
