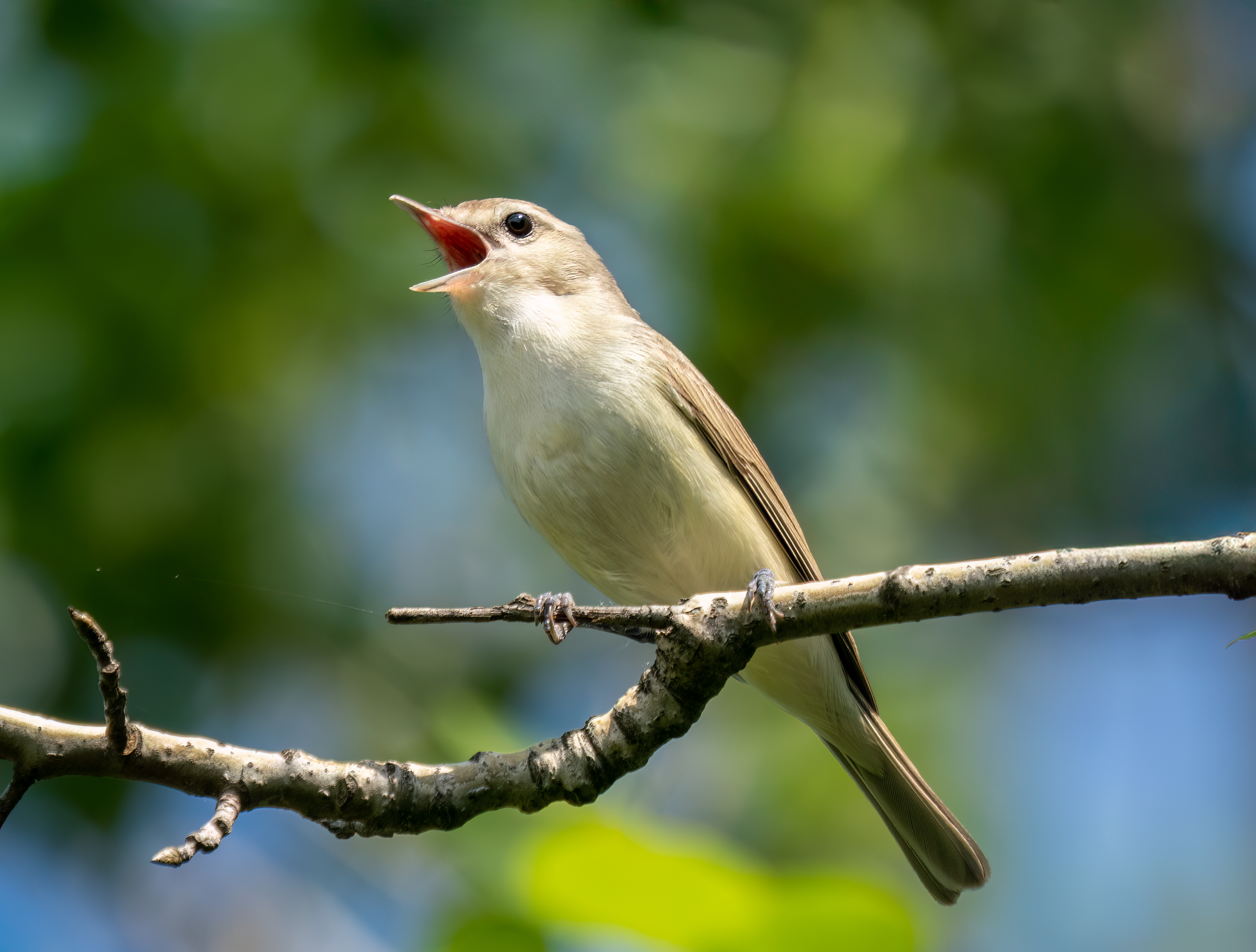
- Adult male singing in New York

Conservation status
- Least Concern (IUCN 3.1)

Scientific classification
- Kingdom: Animalia
- Phylum: Chordata
- Class: Aves
- Order: Passeriformes
- Family: Vireonidae
- Genus: Vireo
- Species: V. gilvus

Binomial name
- Vireo gilvus (Vieillot, 1808)
- Approximate distribution map Breeding range Non-breeding range

= Eastern warbling vireo =

Species of bird

Song
Song, Grey Cloud Dunes SNA, Washington, MN, USA

The eastern warbling vireo (Vireo gilvus) is a small North American songbird. Its breeding habitat is open deciduous and mixed woods from Alaska to Mexico. It often nests in widely spaced trees, often cottonwood or aspen, along streams or rivers. It migrates to Mexico and Central America. The eastern warbling vireo was formerly treated as conspecific with the western warbling vireo (Vireo swainsoni) and the two together were known as the warbling vireo.

== Taxonomy ==
The eastern warbling vireo was formally described and illustrated in 1808 by the French ornithologist Louis Vieillot based on a specimen collected in New York State. He coined the binomial name Muscicapa gilva, where the specific epithet is Latin meaning "pale-yellow". The eastern warbling vireo is now one of 34 species placed in the genus Vireo that was introduced by Vieillot in 1808 in the same work. The species is monotypic: no subspecies are recognised.

The eastern warbling vireo and the western warbling vireo (Vireo swainsoni) were formerly considered as conspecific. They were split by the American Ornithological Society in 2025 and by AviList in 2026 based on differences in morphology, genetics and vocalization.

== Description ==
The eastern warbling vireo is 12–13 cm (4.7–5.1 in) in length and weighs around 13.5 g (0.48 oz). It is mainly olive-grey on the head and upperparts with white underparts; it has brown eyes and the front of the face is light. There is a white supercilium. It has thick blue-grey legs and a stout bill. The eastern warbling vireo forages for insects in trees, hopping along branches and sometimes hovering. It also eats berries, especially before migration and in winter quarters, where it is, like other vireos, apparently quite fond of gumbo-limbo seeds, though it will not venture into human-modified habitat to get them. It makes a deep cup nest suspended from a tree branch or shrub, placed relatively high in the east and lower in the west. The male helps with incubation and may sing from the nest.

The song is a cheerful warble, similar to that of the painted bunting and the purple finch. There are subtle differences in song between eastern and western birds, at least where the ranges meet in Alberta.

The eastern warbling vireo breeds from central Alberta and northern Montana east and south through most of the United States and parts of southern Canada, outside the range of the previous group. It winters south of the Isthmus of Tehuantepec from south-central Chiapas to Nicaragua. It completes its autumn moult on the breeding grounds, while the swainsonii group completes it after leaving.

The brown-capped vireo (Vireo leucophrys), resident in Central America and northern South America, is sometimes considered conspecific with the warbling vireo.

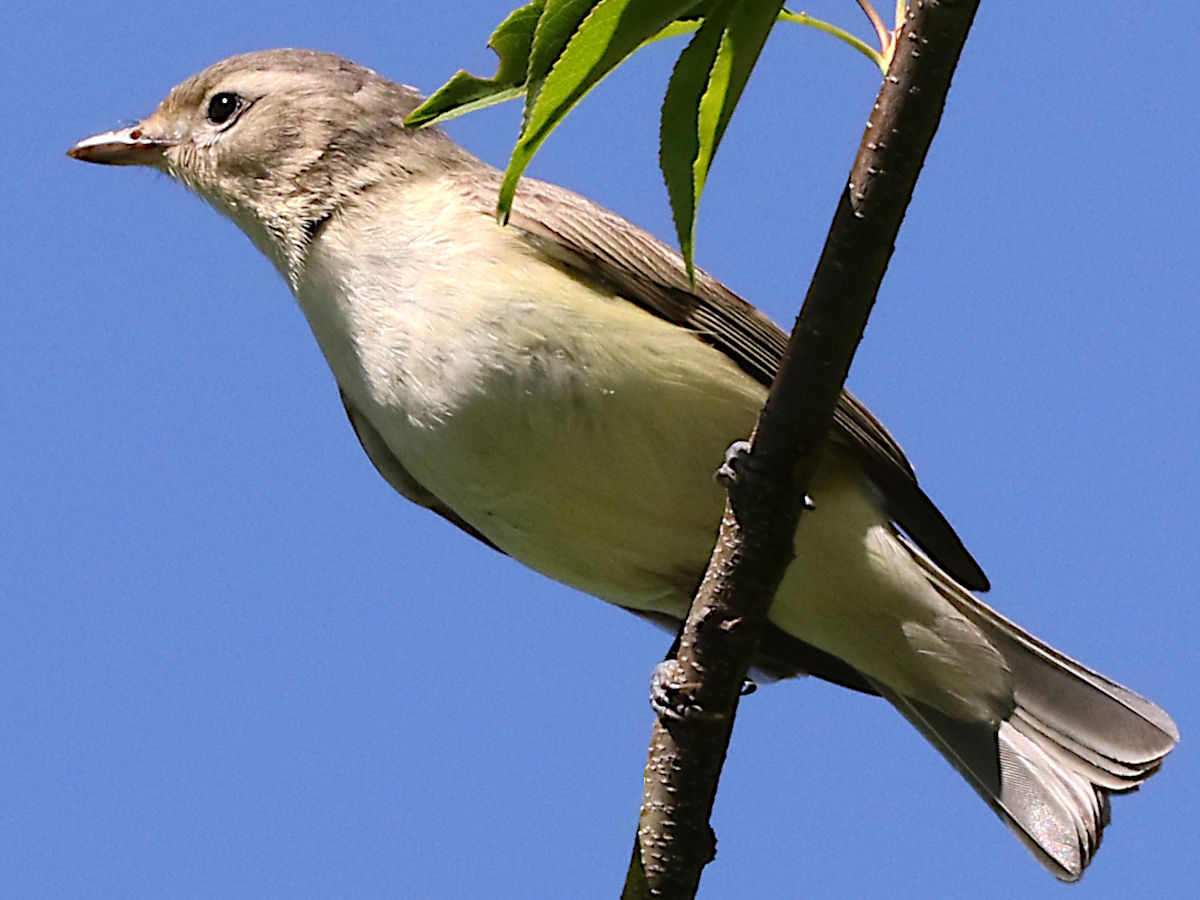
Perched, Illinois

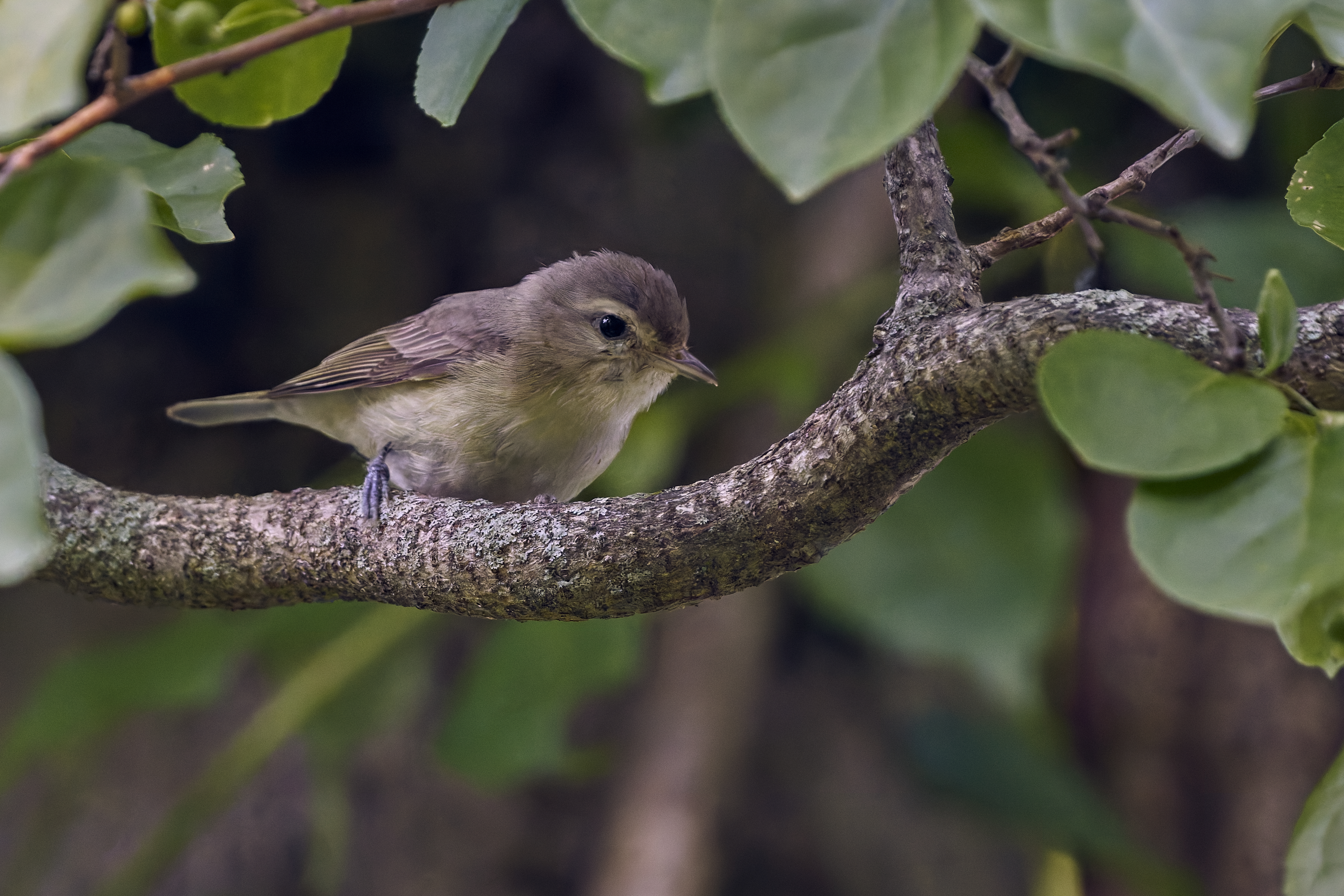
Perched, Connecticut
