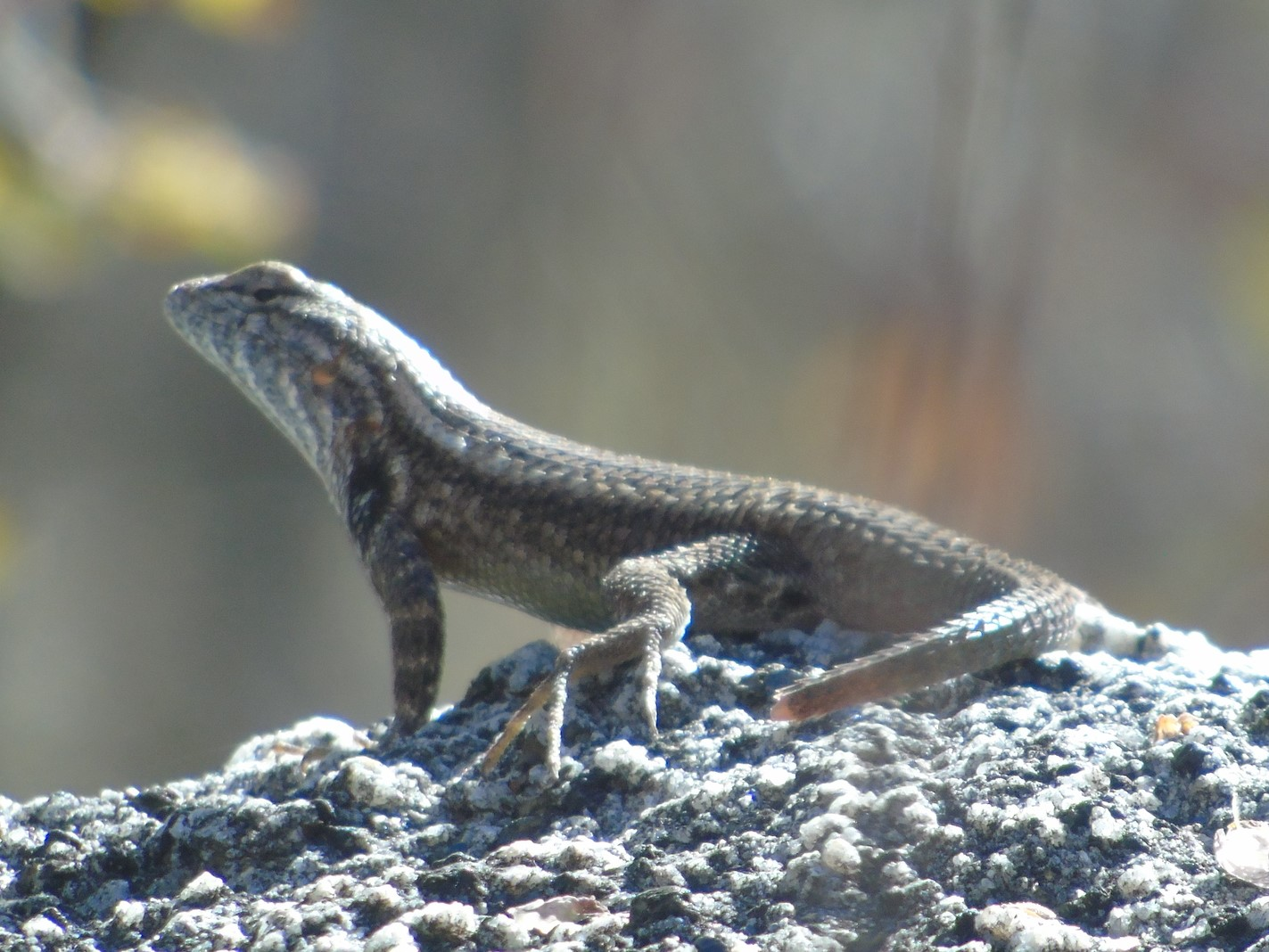

Conservation status
- Least Concern (IUCN 3.1)

Scientific classification
- Kingdom: Animalia
- Phylum: Chordata
- Class: Reptilia
- Order: Squamata
- Suborder: Iguania
- Family: Phrynosomatidae
- Genus: Sceloporus
- Species: S. licki

Binomial name
- Sceloporus licki Van Denburgh, 1895

Synonyms
- Sceloporus orcutti licki Van Denburgh, 1895

= Sceloporus licki =

Species of lizard

Sceloporus licki, also known commonly as the Cape arboreal spiny lizard and el bejori arboricola del cabo in Mexican Spanish, is a species of lizard in the family Phrynosomatidae. The species is endemic to the Sierra de la Laguna on the southern Baja California Peninsula in Mexico.

== Etymology ==
The specific name, licki, is in honor of James Lick, who was an American businessman and philanthropist.

== Description ==
Adults of S. licki have a snout-to-vent length (SVL) of 6.3–7.9 cm (2.5–3.1 in).

== Geographic range ==
S. licki is found in the Mexican State of Baja California Sur.

== Habitat ==
The preferred natural habitats of S. licki are forest and shrubland.

== Reproduction ==
S. licki is oviparous.
