= Sierra de la Laguna pine–oak forests =

Ecoregion in Mexico

Sierra de la Laguna pine-oak forests
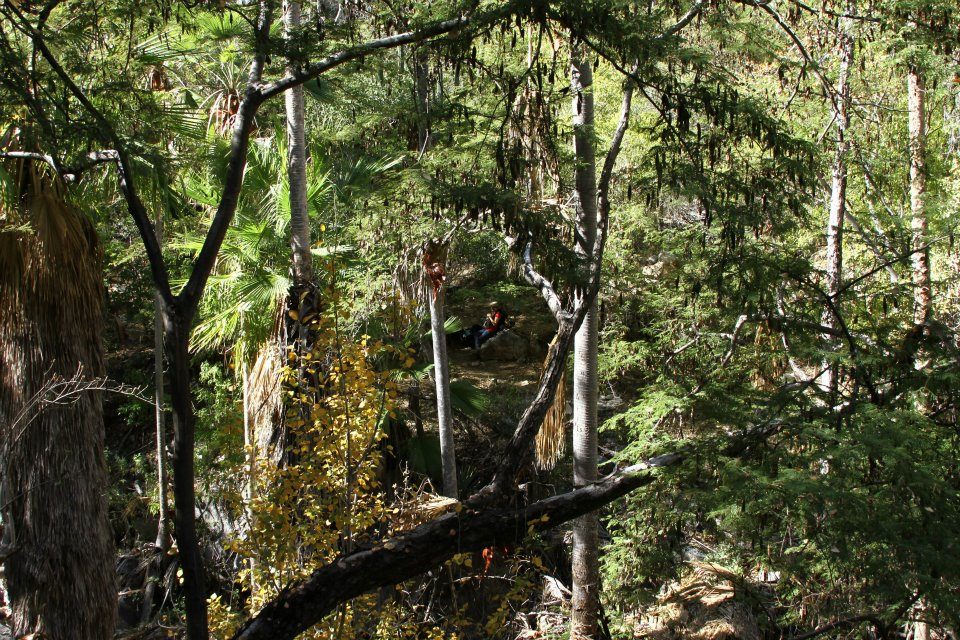
- Sierra de la Laguna pine-oak forest

- Location of the Sierra de la Laguna pine-oak forests

Ecology
- Realm: Neotropical
- Biome: Tropical and subtropical coniferous forests
- Borders: Sierra de la Laguna dry forests

Geography
- Area: 1,061 km^{2} (410 mi^{2})
- Country: Mexico

Conservation
- Conservation status: vulnerable
- Protected: 670 km^{2} (63%)

The Sierra de la Laguna pine–oak forests are a subtropical coniferous forest ecoregion, found in the Sierra de la Laguna mountain range at the southern tip of the Baja California Peninsula, Mexico.

It is found within Los Cabos Municipality and eastern La Paz Municipality of southern Baja California Sur state.

== Setting ==
The ecoregion encompasses an area of 1,100 km^{2} (420 sq mi). The pine–oak forests are found above 800 metres (2,600 ft) in elevation, and are surrounded at lower elevations by the Sierra de la Laguna dry forests. The pine–oak forests have a unique and diverse flora and fauna, including 694 plant species, of which approximately 85 are endemic.

== Climate ==
The higher elevation gives the ecoregion a subtropical to temperate climate, in contrast to the dry tropical climate of the lowlands. Rainfall is higher than the lower-elevation dry forests and deserts of the peninsula, averaging 760 mm annually. Rain falls mostly in the summer, with occasional winter rains.

== Flora ==
The composition of the pine–oak forests varies with elevation; oak woodlands predominate from 800–1,200 metres (2,600–3,900 ft) in elevation, with oak-pine woodlands between 1,200–1,600 metres (3,900–5,200 ft) in elevation, transitioning to pine–oak forests above 1,600 metres (5,200 ft) in elevation. Mosses and lichens are abundant throughout.

The oak woodlands from 800–1,200 metres (2,600–3,900 ft) in elevation are warmer and drier, with evergreen oaks predominant (principally Quercus devia; Quercus arizonica and Quercus rugosa have a limited distribution), along with lower trees and shrubs such as Dodonaea viscosa, Sideroxylon peninsulare, and Buddleia crotonoides.

Above 1,200 metres (3,900 ft) in elevation, the oak woodlands transition to oak-pine forests. The only pine is the local endemic species Laguna pinyon Pinus lagunae, mixed with oaks, including Quercus devia and Quercus tuberculata, and other broadleaf trees, including Arbutus peninsularis and Nolina beldingii. Lower trees and understory shrubs include Calliandra peninsularis, Mimosa xanti, Heterotoma aurita, Verbesina pustulata and Hypericum peninsulare. Above 1,600 metres (5,200 ft) in elevation, pine predominates, mixed with oaks, and with an understory of grasses (Muhlenbergia spp. and Festuca spp.).

== Fauna ==
30 mammal species, 77 birds, 27 reptiles, 2 amphibians, and 108 species of arthropods inhabit the ecoregion.

Larger mammals include mule deer (Odocoileus hemionus), puma (Puma concolor), coyote (canis latrans), gray fox (Urocyon cinereoargenteus), bobcat (Lynx rufus), raccoon (Procyon lotor), ringtail (Bassariscus astutus), and western spotted skunk (Spilogale gracilis).

Resident birds include the cape pygmy owl (Glaucidium hoskinsii), white-winged dove (Zenaida asiatica), acorn woodpecker (Melanerpes formicivorus), and golden eagle (Aquila chrysaetos). Xantus's hummingbird (Basilinna xantusii), Baird's junco (Junco bairdii), the peninsular yellowthroat (Geothlypis beldingi), and the very distinct American robin subspecies Turdus migratorius confinis, by some authors considered a distinct species Turdus confinis, are endemic to the southern Baja California Peninsula.

== Conservation and threats ==
WWF has designated the ecoregion as 'vulnerable'.

A 2017 assessment found that 670 km^{2}, or 63%, of the ecoregion is in protected areas.

In 2003, UNESCO designated a portion of the Sierra de la Laguna as a biosphere reserve. The reserve covers an area of 112,522 ha, of which 32,519 ha is designated the core area, centered on the pine-oak forests. A larger buffer area (80,003 ha) also includes lower-elevation dry forests and shrublands. The reserve is administered by Mexico's Comisión Nacional de Áreas Naturales Protegidas (CONANP).

== See also ==
- List of ecoregions in Mexico
- Natural history of Baja California Sur
- Conifers of Mexico
