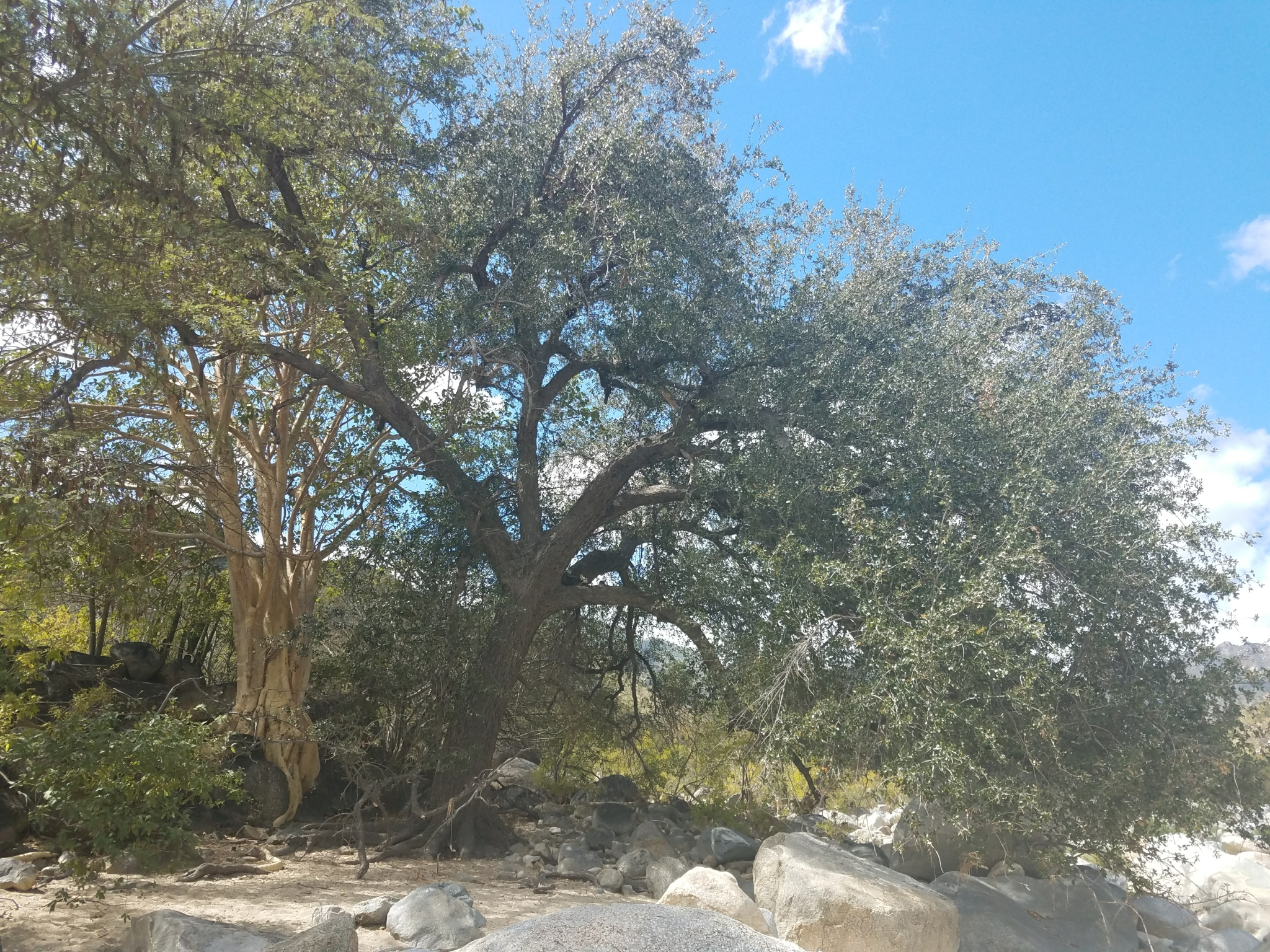

Conservation status
- Endangered (IUCN 3.1)

Scientific classification
- Kingdom: Plantae
- Clade: Tracheophytes
- Clade: Angiosperms
- Clade: Eudicots
- Clade: Rosids
- Order: Fagales
- Family: Fagaceae
- Genus: Quercus
- Subgenus: Quercus subg. Quercus
- Section: Quercus sect. Virentes
- Species: Q. brandegeei

Binomial name
- Quercus brandegeei Goldman

= Quercus brandegeei =

Species of oak tree

Quercus brandegeei is a rare Mexican species of plant in the family Fagaceae, in the oak genus Quercus, section Virentes. It has been found only in the southern part of the State of Baja California Sur in northwestern Mexico.

Quercus brandegeei is an evergreen tree up to 20 metres (66 feet) tall. Leaves are elliptical, not lobed, the blades up to 65 millimetres (2 1/2 inches) long and tapering at both ends, sometimes with no teeth on the edge but sometimes with a few pointed teeth. Its habitat is restricted to stream-side locations.

The species is listed as endangered by the IUCN Red List and threatened by long-term climatic drying and habitat loss.
