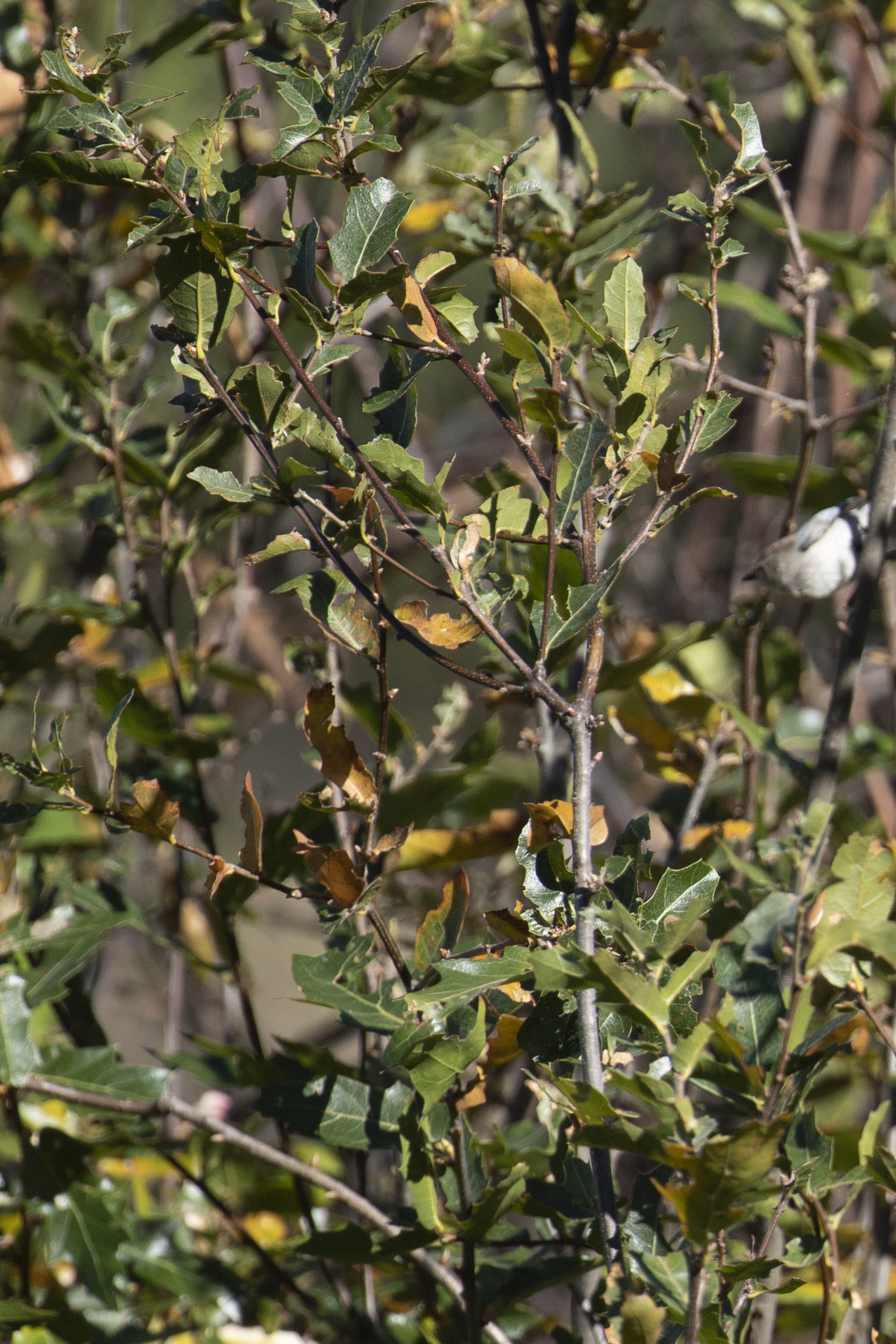

Conservation status
- Endangered (IUCN 3.1)

Scientific classification
- Kingdom: Plantae
- Clade: Embryophytes
- Clade: Tracheophytes
- Clade: Spermatophytes
- Clade: Angiosperms
- Clade: Eudicots
- Clade: Rosids
- Order: Fagales
- Family: Fagaceae
- Genus: Quercus
- Subgenus: Quercus subg. Quercus
- Section: Quercus sect. Lobatae
- Species: Q. devia

Binomial name
- Quercus devia Goldman

= Quercus devia =

Species of oak tree

Quercus devia is a species of oak tree in the family Fagaceae, native to northwestern Mexico. The tree is endemic to the Sierra de la Laguna range of the Peninsular Ranges system, located in the southern part of the Mexican state of Baja California Sur. It grows in Sierra de la Laguna pine-oak forests habitats. It is an IUCN Red List endangered species, threatened by habitat loss. It is placed in section Lobatae.
