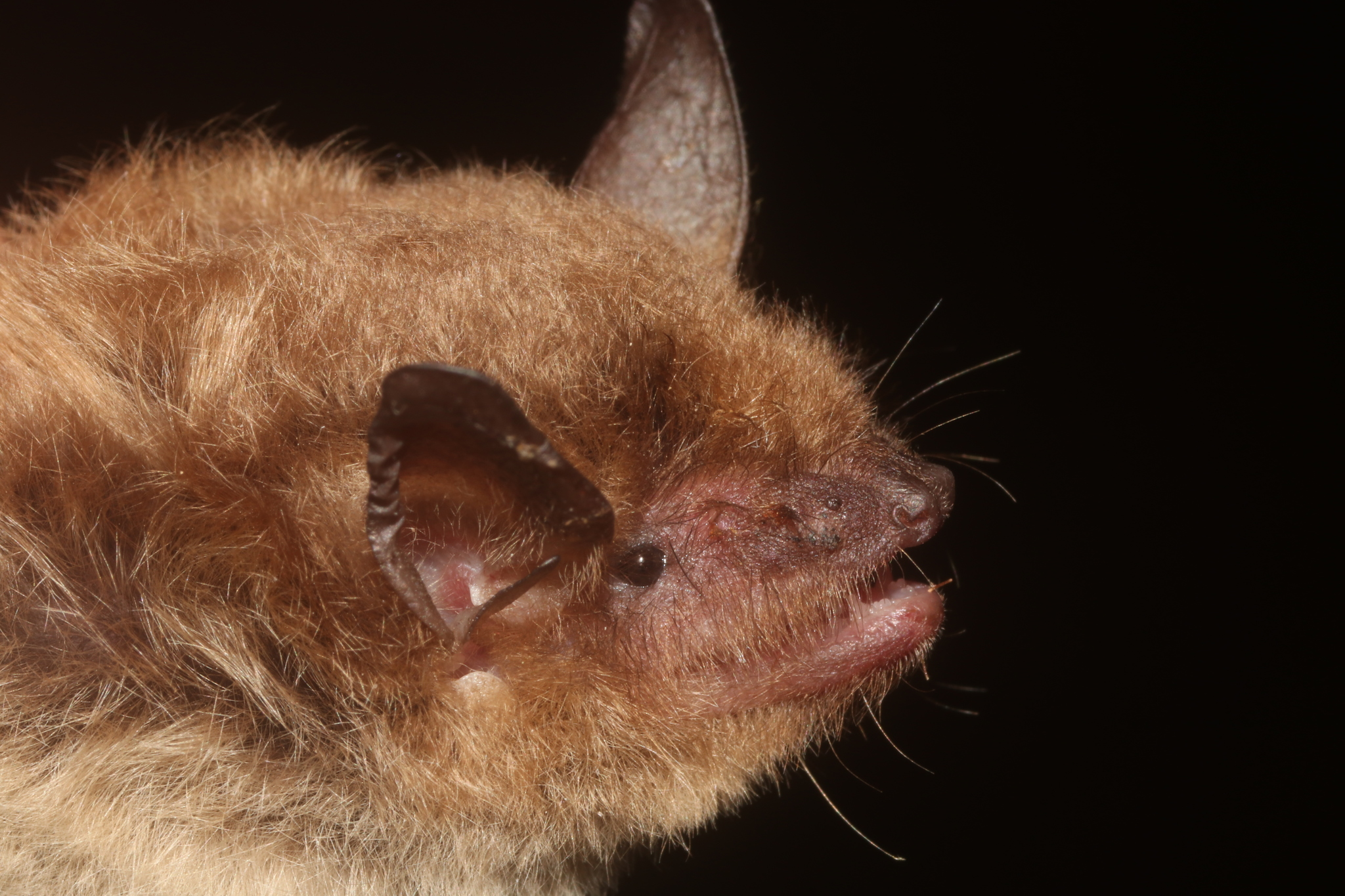

Conservation status
- Endangered (IUCN 3.1)

Scientific classification
- Kingdom: Animalia
- Phylum: Chordata
- Class: Mammalia
- Order: Chiroptera
- Family: Vespertilionidae
- Genus: Myotis
- Species: M. peninsularis

Binomial name
- Myotis peninsularis Miller, 1898
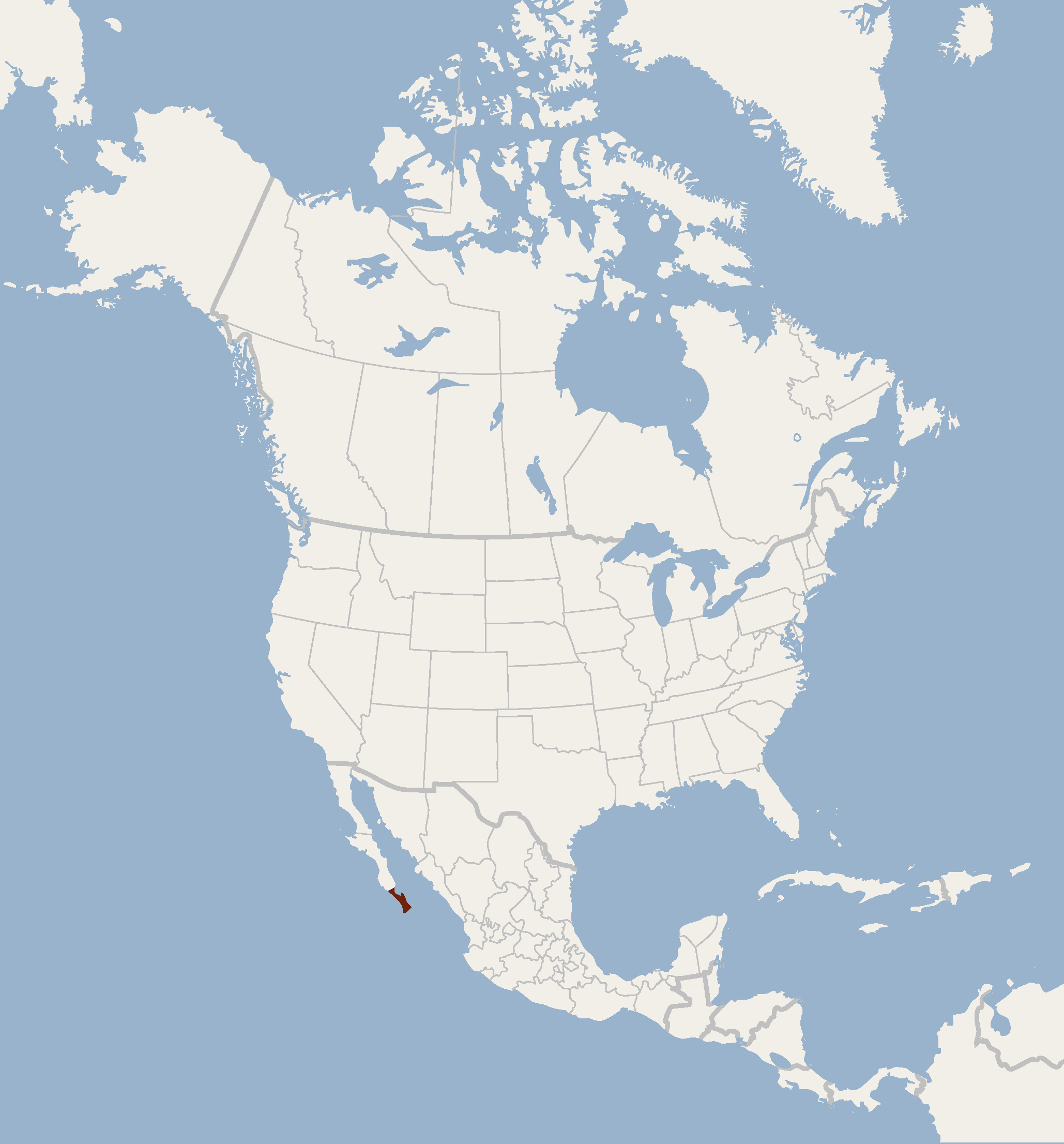

= Peninsular myotis =

Peninsular myotis Myotis peninsularis

Species of bat

The peninsular myotis (Myotis peninsularis) is a species of vesper bat. It is endemic to northwestern Mexico, found only within Baja California Sur state on the southern Baja California Peninsula. Its habitats include the southern Peninsular Ranges and deserts.

== Taxonomy and etymology ==
It was first encountered in August 1896 by Loye H. Miller. It was described by Gerrit Smith Miller Jr. in 1898. It was previously considered a subspecies of the cave myotis, Myotis velifer. Its species name peninsularis is Latin in origin, meaning "of or connected with a peninsula".

== Description ==
It is 91 mm (3.6 in) long. Its tail is 34 mm (1.3 in) long, and does not extend past the uropatagium. Its forearm is 39 mm (1.5 in) long.

== Range and habitat ==
It is only found in southern Baja California.

== Conservation ==
It is currently listed as endangered by the IUCN. It meets the criteria to be listed as endangered because it is only found to in three or four locations, its extent of occurrence is less than 4,000 km^{2} (1,500 mi^{2}), and its habitat is expected to decline in quality in extent in the future. Tourist activities pose a threat to this species.
