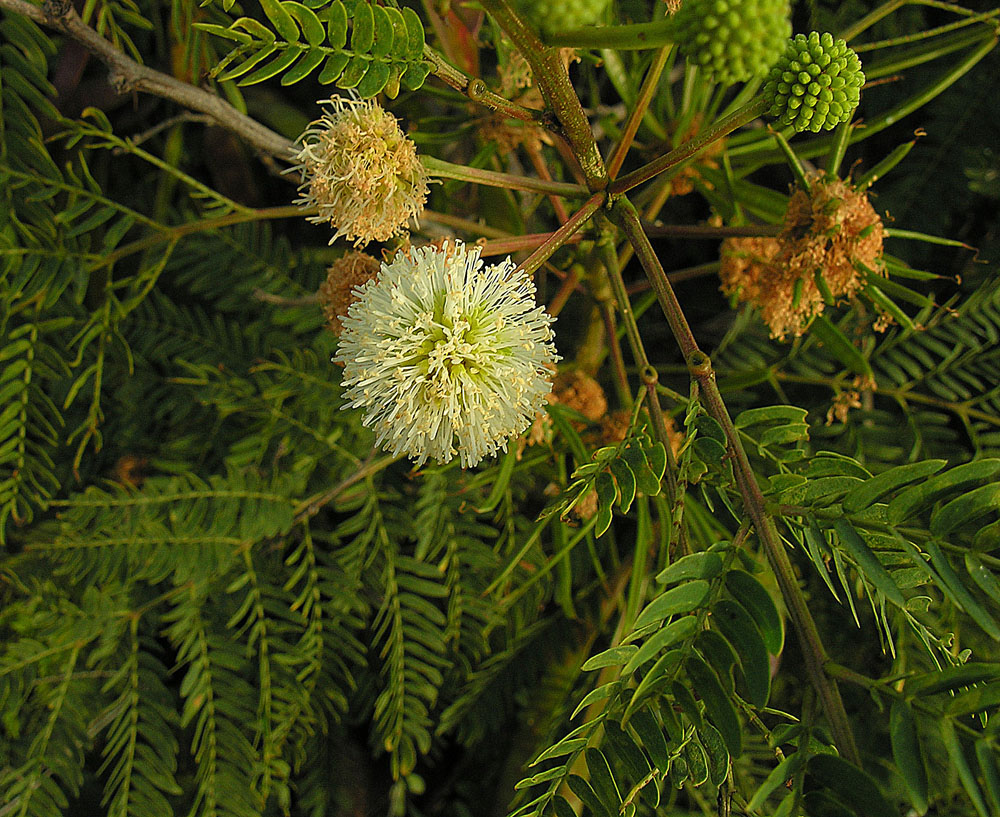

Conservation status
- Least Concern (IUCN 3.1)

Scientific classification
- Kingdom: Plantae
- Clade: Tracheophytes
- Clade: Angiosperms
- Clade: Eudicots
- Clade: Rosids
- Order: Fabales
- Family: Fabaceae
- Subfamily: Caesalpinioideae
- Clade: Mimosoid clade
- Genus: Lysiloma
- Species: L. divaricatum

Binomial name
- Lysiloma divaricatum (Jacq.) J.F.Macbr.

Synonyms
- Acacia arborea Benth.; Acacia divaricata (Jacq.) Willd.; Lysiloma affine Britton & Rose; Lysiloma australe Britton & Rose; Lysiloma calderonii Britton & Rose; Lysiloma cayucense M.E.Jones; Lysiloma chiapense Britton & Rose; Lysiloma kellermanii Britton & Rose; Lysiloma microphyllum Benth.; Lysiloma ortegae Britton & Rose; Lysiloma pueblense Britton & Rose; Lysiloma salvadorense Britton & Rose; Lysiloma seemannii Britton & Rose; Mimosa divaricata Jacq.

= Lysiloma divaricatum =

Species of tree found in Mexico and Central America

Lysiloma divaricatum is a flowering tree native to Mexico and Central America. Common names include mauto, quitaz, and tepemesquite in Mexico, quebracho in Costa Rica, Honduras, Mexico, and Nicaragua, and quebracho negro, tepemisque, and yaje in El Salvador.

== Description ==
Lysiloma divaricatum is typically a small to medium-sized tree, densely branched, with an open spreading crown up to 15 meters high.

== Distribution and habitat ==
Lysiloma divaricatum ranges from northern Mexico to Costa Rica.

It is found in tropical and subtropical dry deciduous forest, mixed pine forest, and occasionally in desert scrub with cactus. It ranges from sea level up to 1100 meters elevation, and occasionally up to 1750 meters. It is often found on slopes growing on volcanic and sandy clay soils.

In Baja California it is commonly associated with Caesalpinia pannosa. Elsewhere it is often found with other dry forest species like Chloroleucon mangense, Leucaena macrophylla and Senna mollissima, along with species of Acacia, Parkinsonia, Calycophyllum, Mimosa, Myrospermum, and Burseraceae.

== Gallery ==
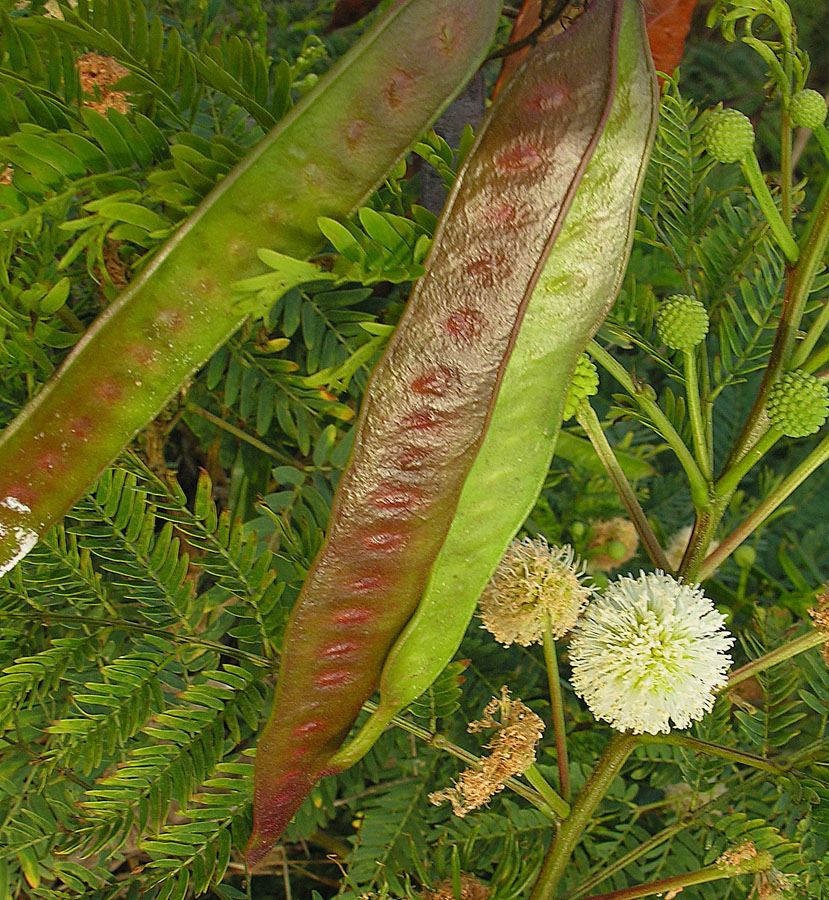
Seed pods and flowers

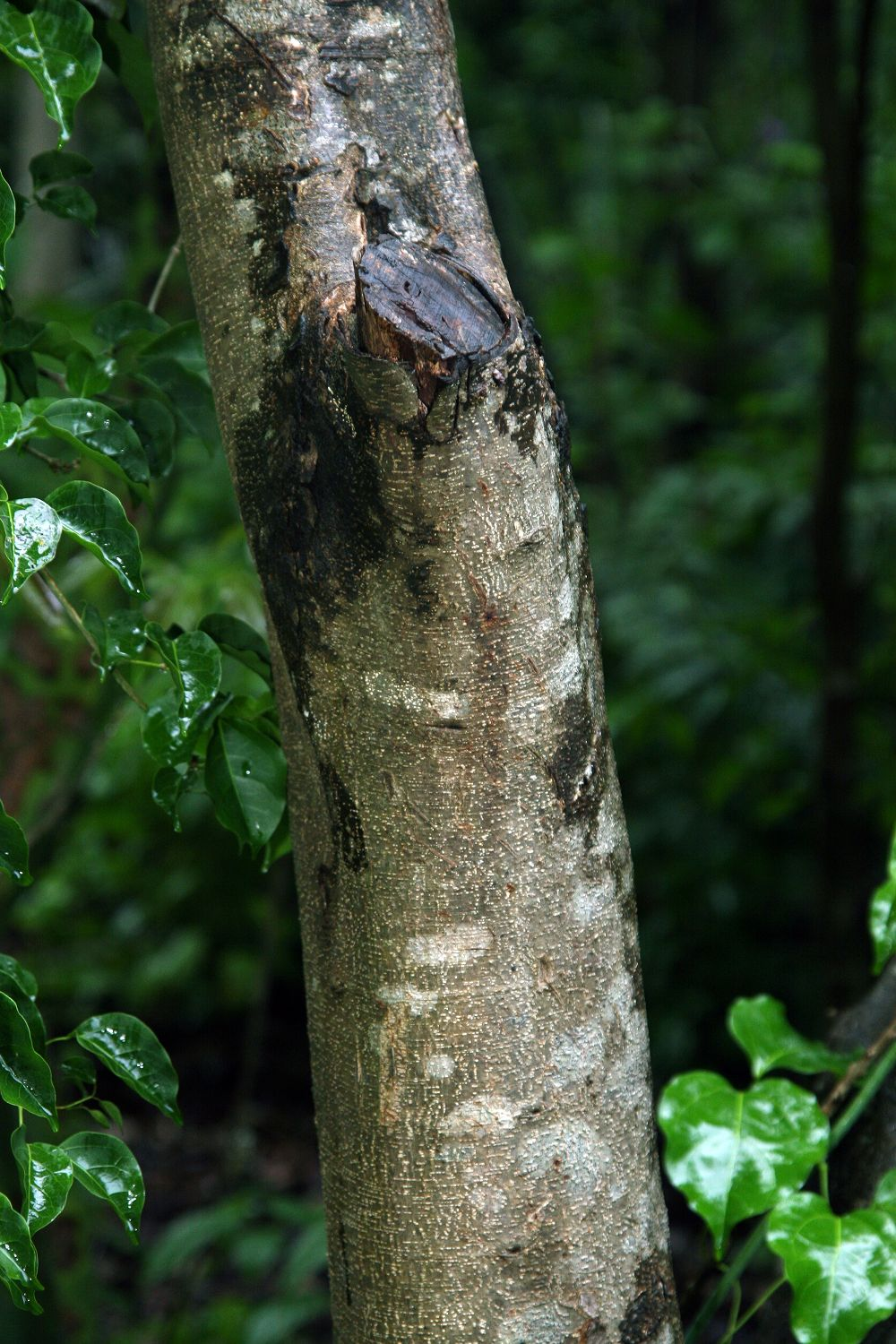
trunk

== Conservation ==
The population is considered stable, and the species is assessed as Least Concern due to its wide distribution, large population, and absence of major threats.
