= Sierra de la Laguna =

Mountain range at the southern end of the Baja California Peninsula in Mexico

Coordinates: 23°34′N 110°00′W

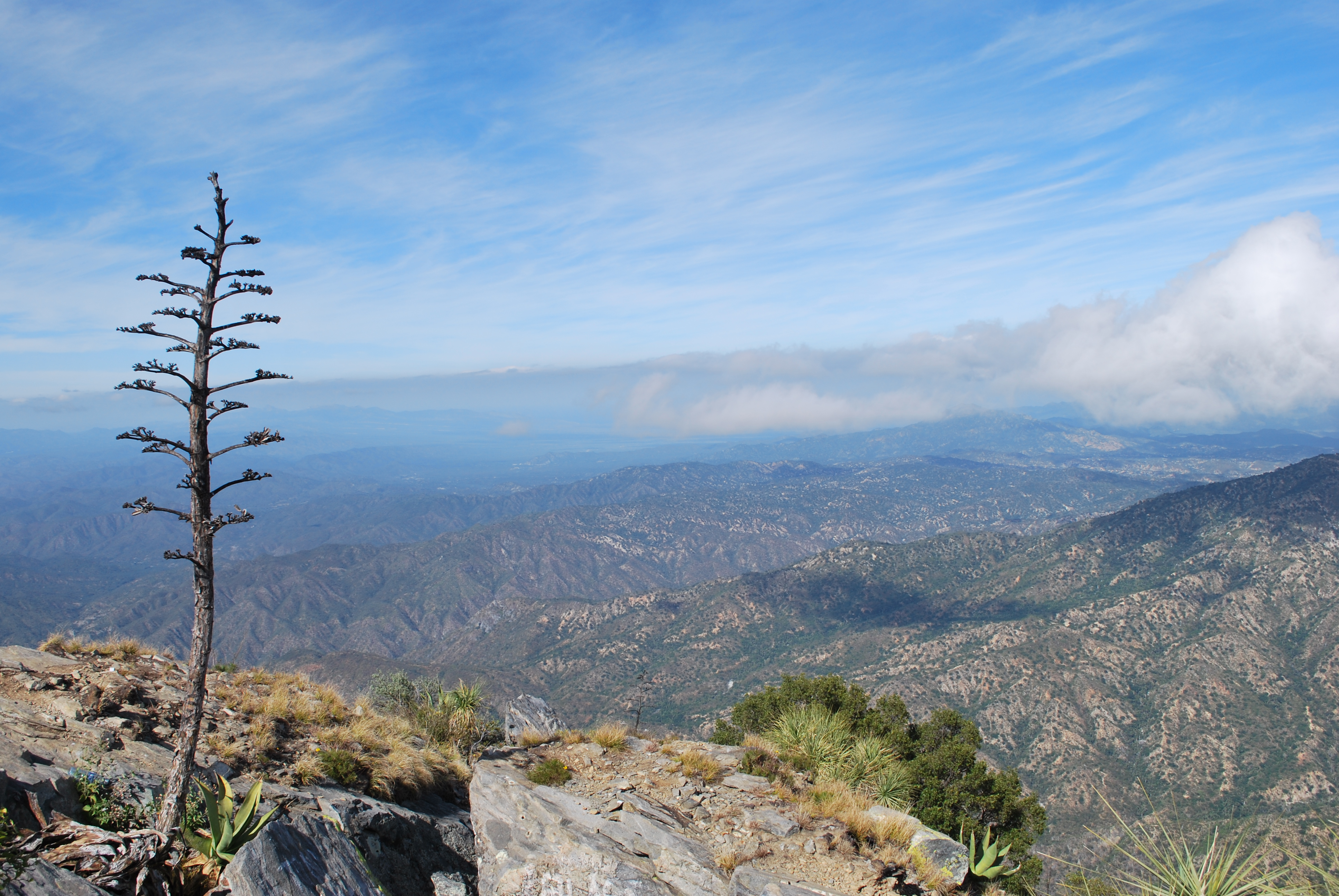
- View from El Picacho.

Highest point
- Peak: Sierra de la Laguna High Point
- Elevation: 6,830 ft (2,080 m)

Geography
- Location within Baja California Sur Location within Mexico
- Country: Mexico
- State: Baja California Sur
- Municipalities: La Paz Municipality; Los Cabos Municipality

Geology
- Rock type: Peninsular Ranges

The Sierra de la Laguna is a mountain range at the southern end of the Baja California peninsula in Mexico, and is the southernmost range of the Peninsular Ranges System.

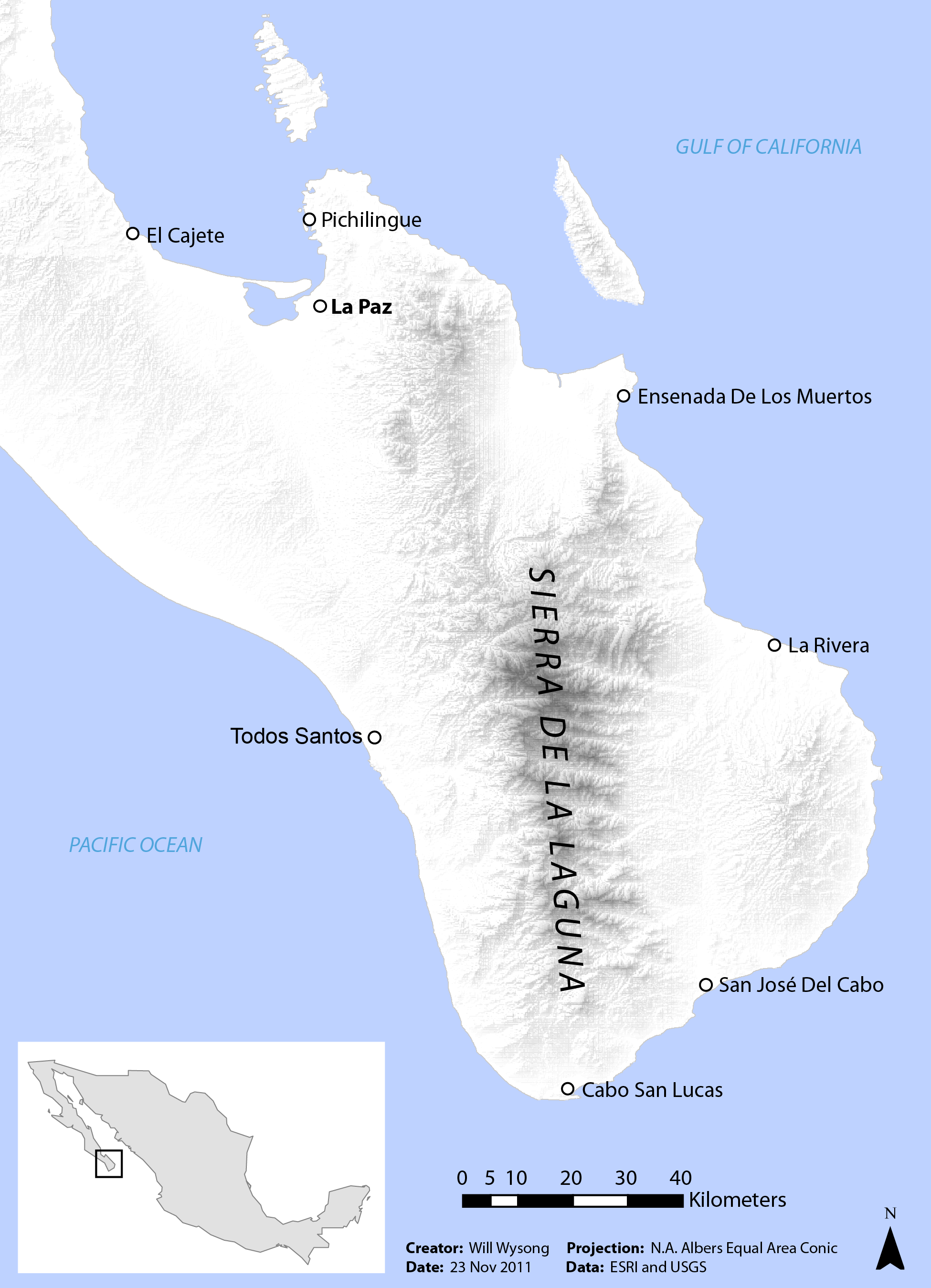
A map of the Sierra de la Laguna

It is located in La Paz Municipality and Los Cabos Municipality of southern Baja California Sur state.

The "Sierra de la Laguna High Point", at 2,080 metres (6,830 ft) in elevation, is the highest point of the range and in Baja California Sur state.

== Ecology ==
The southern tip of the Baja California peninsula, including the Sierra de la Laguna, was formerly an island in prehistoric times. It has a distinctive flora and fauna, with many affinities to Southwestern Mexico. The Sierra is home to many endemic species and subspecies. Some of the plant species restricted to the region are Behria leonis, Bidens cabopulmensis, Daphnopsis lagunae, Diospyros intricata, Dudleya nubigena, Erythranthe lagunensis, Hibiscus ribifolius, Mammillaria petrophila, Morangaya pensilis, Physalis glabra, Quercus brandegeei, Stenotis asperuloides, and Yucca capensis.

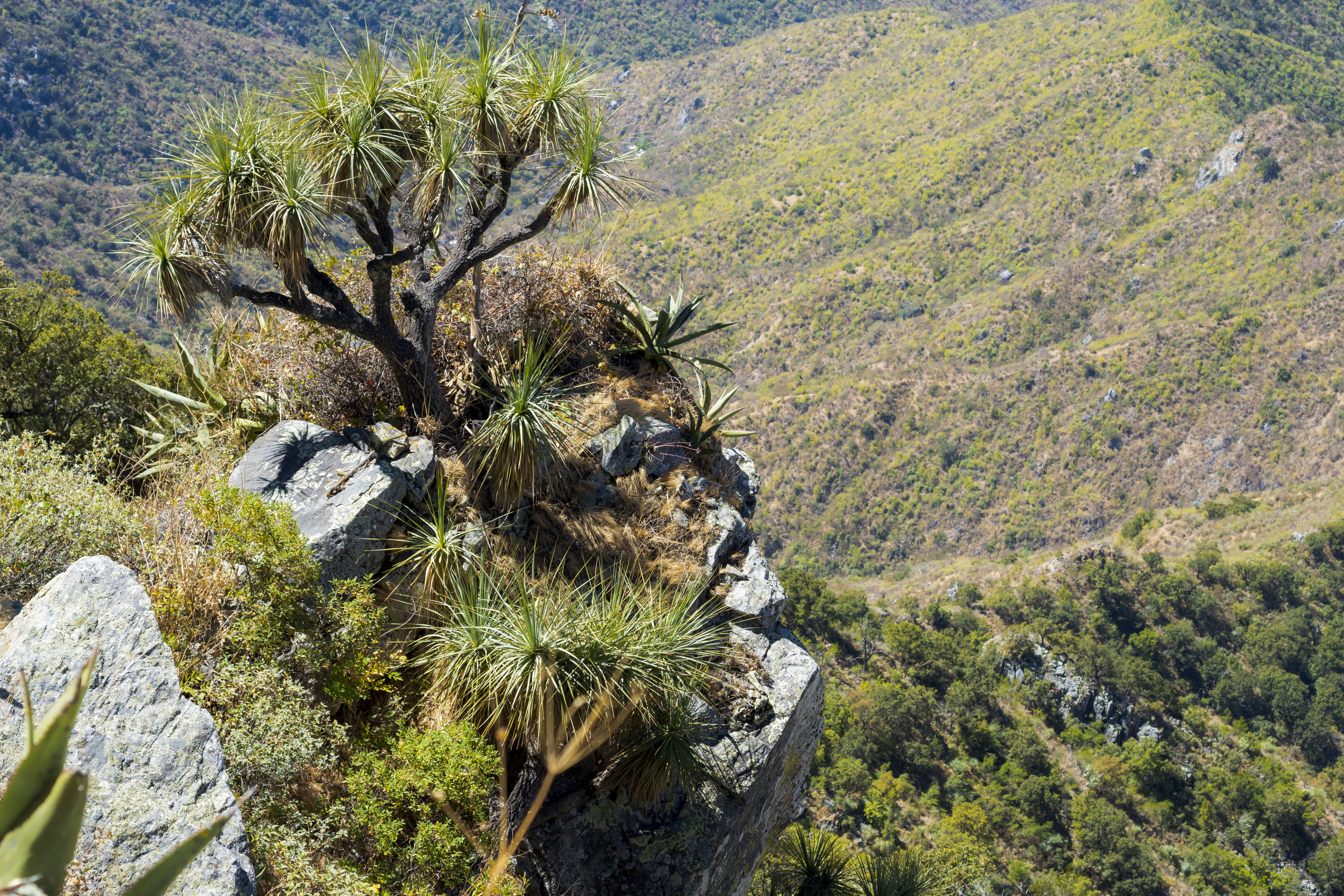
Nolina beldingii at El Picacho

The dry San Lucan xeric scrub ecoregion extends from the sea level at the coast to 250 metres (820 ft) in elevation. The Sierra de la Laguna dry forests ecoregion occupy lower portion of the range, from 250–800 metres (820–2,620 ft) in elevation.

Above 800 metres (2,600 ft) in elevation, the dry forests transition to the Sierra de la Laguna pine-oak forests ecoregion. The composition of the pine-oak forests varies with elevation; oak woodlands predominate from 800–1,200 metres (2,600–3,900 ft) in elevation, with oak-pine woodlands between 1,200–1,600 metres (3,900–5,200 ft) in elevation, transitioning to pine-oak forests above 1,600 metres (5,200 ft) in elevation. The only pine is the local endemic species Laguna pinyon Pinus lagunae.

The upper reaches of the mountains include endemic species such as a rare succulent plant Dudleya rigida, and a beargrass known as Nolina beldingii.

The forests are exploited commercially for timber, and cattle-raising is common in the oak woodland and dry forest zones.

The Sierra holds a number of endemic bird species and subspecies, including Baird's junco Junco bairdii and the very distinct American robin subspecies Turdus migratorius confinis, by some authors considered a distinct species Turdus confinis.

=== Biosphere reserve ===
UNESCO has designated the Sierra de la Laguna a global biosphere reserve: "This semi arid to temperate subhumid climate area represents highly important and contrasted ecosystems, including arid zones, matorrales, low deciduous forest type, evergreen oak: Quercus devia (“encino”) woods, pine-evergreen oak mix woods and oases with palms and “guerivos” situated throughout the gallery forest following the long river basins." The Biosphere reserve was established by a Mexican presidential decree of 6 June 1994, which designated a core area and buffer zones.

The core area is centered on the higher-elevation oak-pine forests, while the transition area includes the communities of Todos Santos, El Pescadero, El Triunfo, San Antonio, San Bartolo, Buena Vista, Los Barriles, Las Cuevas, Santiago and Miraflores, Baja California Sur.

== Climate ==
The climate is influenced by its elevation. At higher elevations it has a subtropical highland climate with cool temperatures year round and higher amounts of precipitation.

Climate data for Sierra de la Laguna, elev. 1,906 metres (6,253 ft)
Month	Jan	Feb	Mar	Apr	May	Jun	Jul	Aug	Sep	Oct	Nov	Dec	Year
Record high °C (°F)	25.0 (77.0)	26.0 (78.8)	29.5 (85.1)	29.0 (84.2)	32.5 (90.5)	34.0 (93.2)	31.0 (87.8)	36.0 (96.8)	33.0 (91.4)	31.0 (87.8)	29.0 (84.2)	30.0 (86.0)	36.0 (96.8)
Mean daily maximum °C (°F)	15.8 (60.4)	17.2 (63.0)	19.0 (66.2)	21.1 (70.0)	22.7 (72.9)	24.4 (75.9)	23.8 (74.8)	22.9 (73.2)	22.4 (72.3)	21.2 (70.2)	19.0 (66.2)	17.4 (63.3)	20.6 (69.1)
Daily mean °C (°F)	8.9 (48.0)	9.7 (49.5)	11.2 (52.2)	13.4 (56.1)	15.2 (59.4)	17.8 (64.0)	18.3 (64.9)	17.6 (63.7)	17.1 (62.8)	15.0 (59.0)	12.0 (53.6)	10.2 (50.4)	13.9 (57.0)
Mean daily minimum °C (°F)	2.1 (35.8)	2.3 (36.1)	3.4 (38.1)	5.7 (42.3)	7.7 (45.9)	11.3 (52.3)	12.9 (55.2)	12.4 (54.3)	11.8 (53.2)	8.8 (47.8)	5.1 (41.2)	3.1 (37.6)	7.2 (45.0)
Record low °C (°F)	−7.0 (19.4)	−7.0 (19.4)	−6.0 (21.2)	−4.0 (24.8)	−1.0 (30.2)	1.0 (33.8)	7.0 (44.6)	5.0 (41.0)	4.5 (40.1)	−2.0 (28.4)	−6.0 (21.2)	−6.0 (21.2)	−7.0 (19.4)
Average precipitation mm (inches)	31.1 (1.22)	10.2 (0.40)	6.1 (0.24)	3.0 (0.12)	0.2 (0.01)	7.6 (0.30)	110.8 (4.36)	181.7 (7.15)	166.6 (6.56)	72.4 (2.85)	18.5 (0.73)	39.5 (1.56)	647.7 (25.50)
Average precipitation days (≥ 0.1 mm)	1.92	1.32	0.78	0.37	0.18	0.90	7.62	11.91	9.45	4.65	1.86	2.60	43.56
Average snowy days	0	0.04	0	0	0	0	0	0	0	0	0	0	0.04
Source 1: Colegio de Postgraduados
Source 2: Servicio Meteorológico National (extremes)
