= Hamber =

Hamber is a surname. Notable people with the surname include:

- Eric Hamber (1879–1960), Canadian businessman and the 15th Lieutenant Governor of British Columbia
- Jan Hamber, American ornithologist and conservationist
- John Hamber (1931–2013), sailor who represented the United States Virgin Islands

== See also ==
- Eric Hamber Secondary School, is a public secondary school located in the South Cambie neighbourhood of Vancouver, British Columbia, Canada
- Hamber Provincial Park, is a provincial park in British Columbia, Canada
