= Sierra de San Pedro Mártir National Park =

National park in Baja California, Mexico

- IUCN category II (national park)
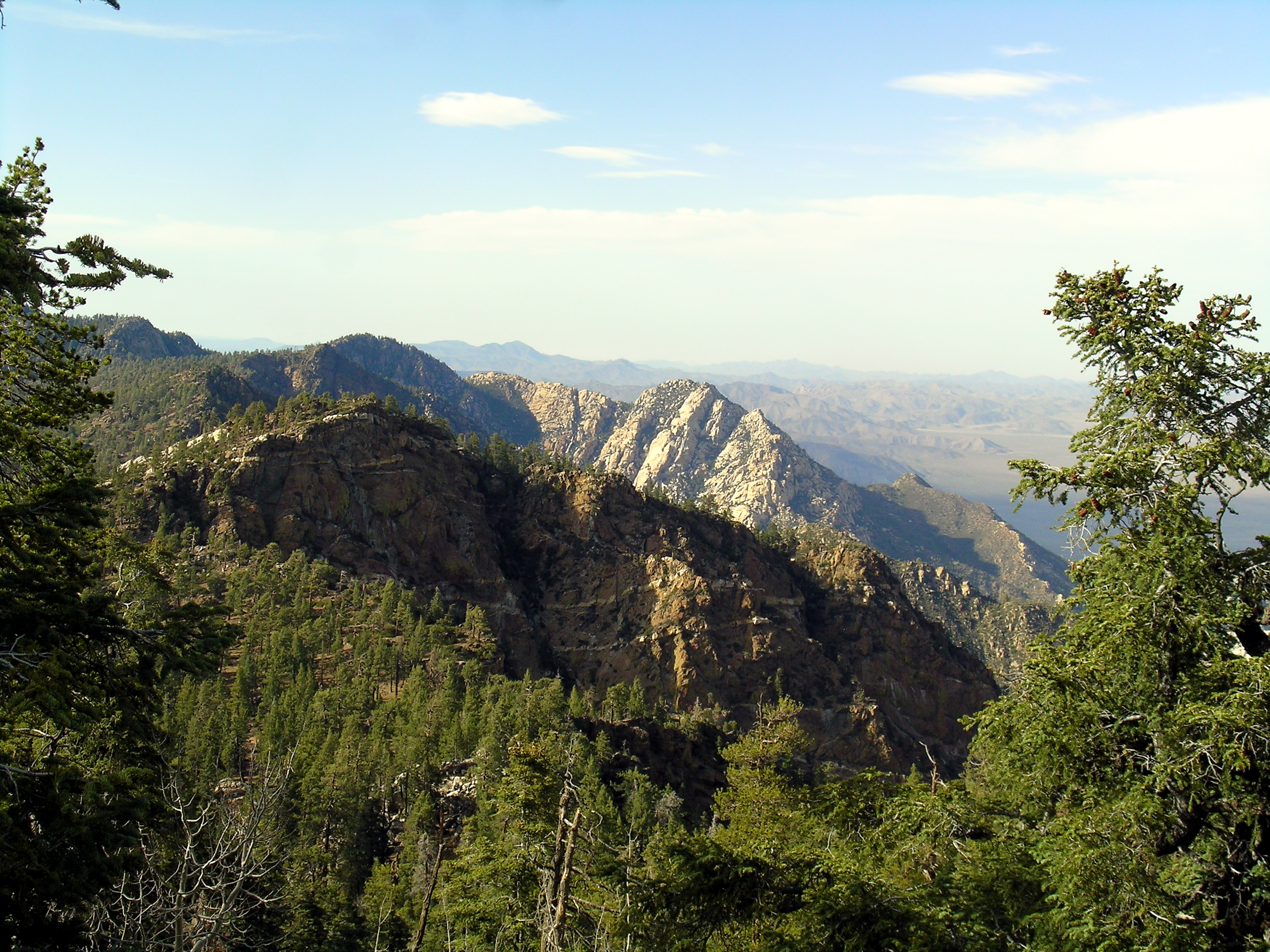

- Location within Mexico
- Location: Ensenada Municipality, Mexicali Municipality, Baja California, Mexico
- Nearest city: San Felipe, Baja California
- Coordinates: 30°54′19″N 115°30′04″W
- Area: 72,909 hectares (180,160 acres)
- Established: April 26, 1947
- Governing body: Secretariat of the Environment and Natural Resources

Sierra de San Pedro Mártir National Park is a national park in the Mexican state of Baja California. The Park is part of the municipality of Ensenada, Baja California. The area was first explored by Native people then Europeans in 1701 by Eusebio Francisco Kino by Dominican orders.

The park is known for its pine trees and granite rock formations. Sierra de San Pedro Mártir is a mountain range that runs north-south along the middle part of northwestern Baja California, Mexico. With its name Spanish for "mountains of Saint Peter the Martyr". Picacho del Diablo (Devil's Peak) is the highest peak in the park and in Baja California with its summit reaching 3,096 meters (10,157 feet). Sierra de San Pedro Mártir National Park is one of the few pine forests that exists on the Baja California peninsula that is important habitat for native Bighorn Sheep. In addition the park is home to the California condor through re-introduction program by several international agencies.

The National Astronomical Observatory, built in 1971 on a neighboring peak, Cerro del la Cúpula, is home to Mexico's largest optical telescope, with a diameter of 2.12 meters, and a weight of 40 tons in total. The observatory is the second most important in Latin America.

== History ==
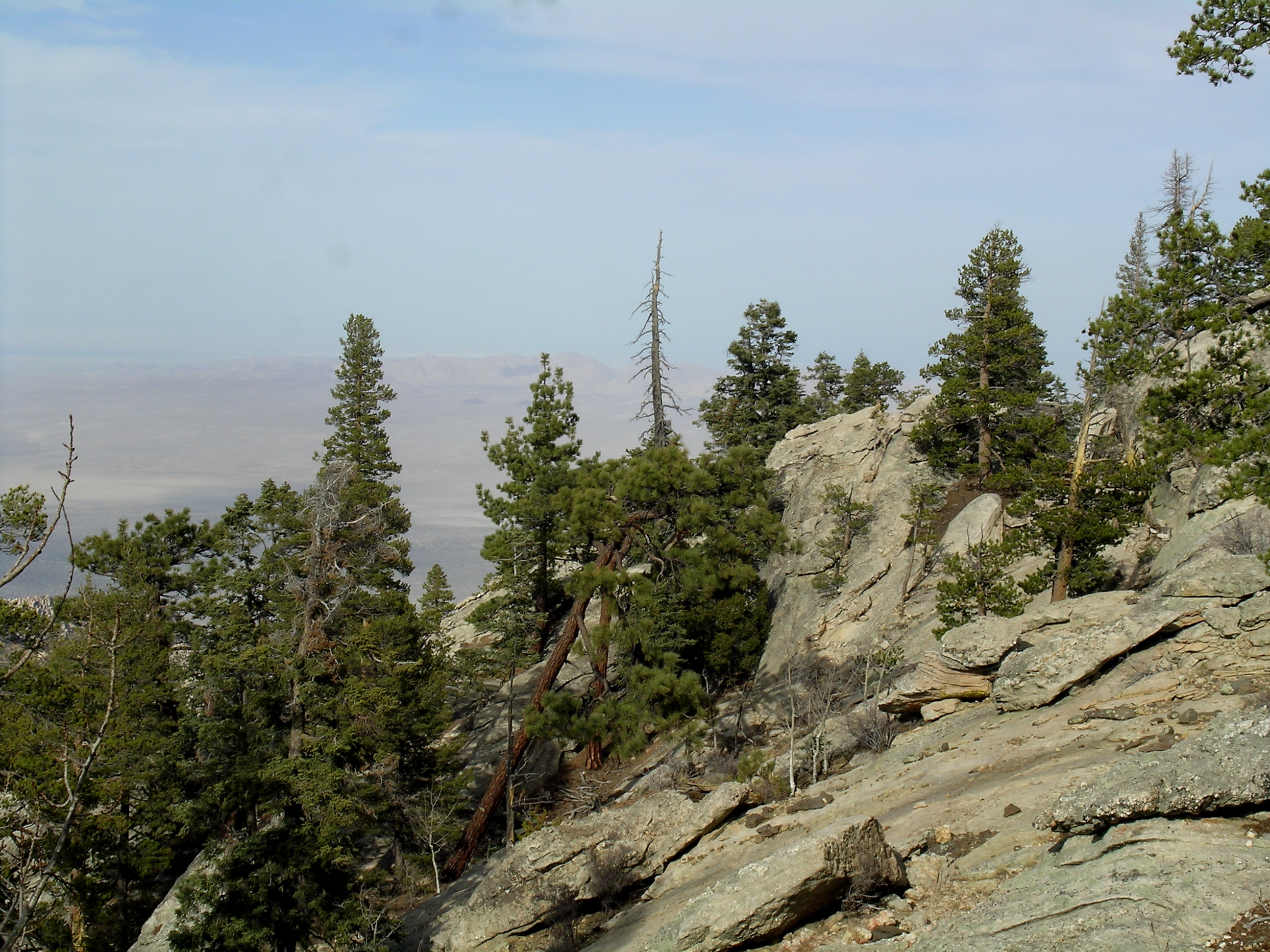
Granite rock formations in Sierra San Pedro Martir

The first European explorations of the region were realized by the Jesuit order during the evangelization era of the neo-Hispanic territories of California. The regions of the Sierra de San Pedro Mártir are thought to have been explored by father Eusebio Francisco Kino and father Wenceslao Link in 1701. Later the Dominicans continuing the evangelization movement built the Misión San Pedro Mártir de Verona in the southern part of the park, but only ruins are left of the site.

Sierra de San Pedro Mártir National Park was officially created by decree on April 26, 1947, in which 72,909 hectares were set aside and declared protected by the Mexican Federal government. The National Astronomical Observatory is located at an elevation of 2,830 m (9,280 ft). The observatory was built in 1975, and has several large telescopes, the largest of which is 2.1 m (83 in). The observatory takes advantage of the high elevation, along with typically clear skies, low relative humidity, low atmospheric pollution, low light pollution, and low levels of radio interference.

== Geography ==
Sierra de San Pedro Mártir National Park is a national park located on the northern part of the Cordillera Baja California Mountain Range, known as Sierra de San Pedro Mártir.

The elevated peak is thought to have begun to rise in the Paleozoic era through tectonic rifts. Sierra de San Pedro Mártir a rugged mountain range with drastic topological changes covered with pine forest and surrounded by large deserts. Because it is surrounded by deserts, the park is often described as an oasis.

Picacho del Diablo is the highest peak in the park measuring 3,096 meters (10,157 feet) above sea level. Picacho del Diablo is on the east side of the park. Throughout the park there are several deep canyons and many abrupt topological changes.

== Climate ==
The Sierra de San Pedro Mártir Mountain Range has two main climates with an average annual temperature of 20 °C (68 °F). A Continental climate Dsa in the higher elevations and semiarid climate in the lower elevations. In the higher elevations the rainy season comes during the winter with 36% precipitation falling with frequent rainstorms and several snowstorms. During the summer in the higher elevations with 22.9% precipitation falling. Winters are mild with temperatures typically varying from 3 to 18 °C (37 to 64 °F). Summers are warm with temperatures varying from 18 to 22 °C (64 to 72 °F). Temperatures vary drastically throughout the park according to elevation due to dramatic topographical changes. During the winter in the extreme high elevations large amount of snow accumulates while in the summer the lower elevations exceed 38 °C (100 °F).

Climate data for Sierra de San Pedro Mártir National Park (National Astronomical Observatory, 2,800m amsl/9,186ft amsl)
Month	Jan	Feb	Mar	Apr	May	Jun	Jul	Aug	Sep	Oct	Nov	Dec	Year
Record high °C (°F)	12.8 (55.0)	16.2 (61.2)	13.5 (56.3)	15.4 (59.7)	19.1 (66.4)	23.4 (74.1)	23.3 (73.9)	21.3 (70.3)	20.5 (68.9)	17.4 (63.3)	13.7 (56.7)	8.8 (47.8)	23.4 (74.1)
Mean daily maximum °C (°F)	1.2 (34.2)	3.4 (38.1)	8.2 (46.8)	10.3 (50.5)	11.3 (52.3)	18.5 (65.3)	17.6 (63.7)	19.3 (66.7)	16.0 (60.8)	13.2 (55.8)	7.6 (45.7)	1.0 (33.8)	11.1 (52.0)
Daily mean °C (°F)	−1.8 (28.8)	−0.3 (31.5)	4.8 (40.6)	6.6 (43.9)	7.7 (45.9)	14.9 (58.8)	15.0 (59.0)	16.6 (61.9)	13.3 (55.9)	10.2 (50.4)	3.9 (39.0)	−2.2 (28.0)	7.8 (46.0)
Mean daily minimum °C (°F)	−4.7 (23.5)	−4.2 (24.4)	1.3 (34.3)	2.8 (37.0)	4.1 (39.4)	11.2 (52.2)	12.3 (54.1)	14.0 (57.2)	10.6 (51.1)	7.2 (45.0)	0.2 (32.4)	−5.4 (22.3)	4.5 (40.1)
Record low °C (°F)	−9.2 (15.4)	−16.6 (2.1)	−10.3 (13.5)	−10.7 (12.7)	−5.3 (22.5)	6.0 (42.8)	8.2 (46.8)	11.8 (53.2)	6.0 (42.8)	−3.4 (25.9)	−9.4 (15.1)	−9.8 (14.4)	−16.6 (2.1)
Record low wind chill	−15.7	−32	−16.8	−20.4	−14	0.1	—	—	0.6	−11.4	−19.9	−19.3	−32
Average precipitation mm (inches)	80.7 (3.18)	20.9 (0.82)	53.9 (2.12)	12.7 (0.50)	7.4 (0.29)	0.8 (0.03)	37.1 (1.46)	45.2 (1.78)	23.9 (0.94)	3.9 (0.15)	41.2 (1.62)	54.4 (2.14)	382.1 (15.04)
Average precipitation days	6.2	2.0	4.0	1.8	1.0	0.1	2.6	3.3	2.5	0.6	3.4	3.4	30.9
Source: National Autonomous University of Mexico

== Flora and fauna ==
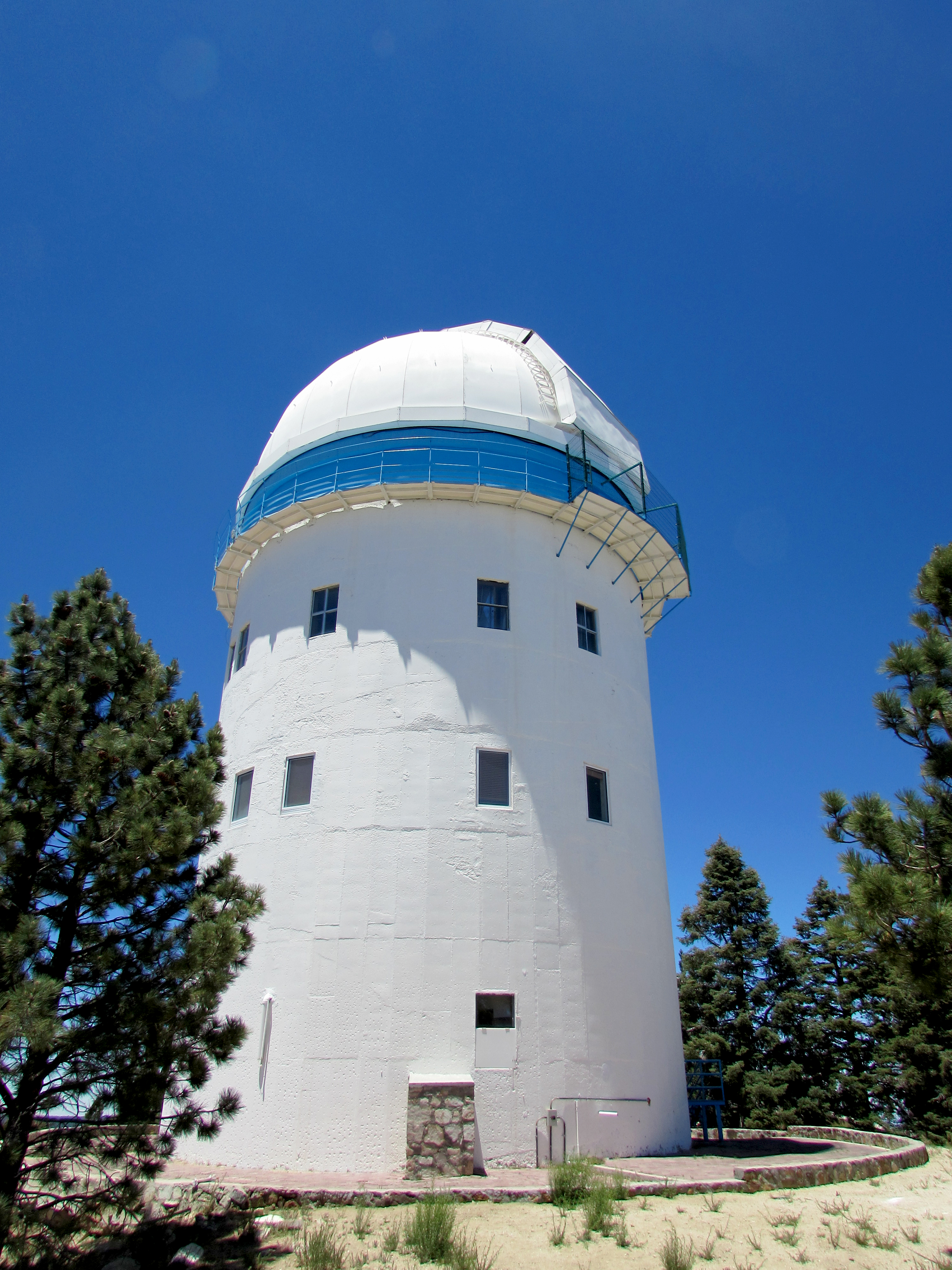
Observatory in San Pedro Martir

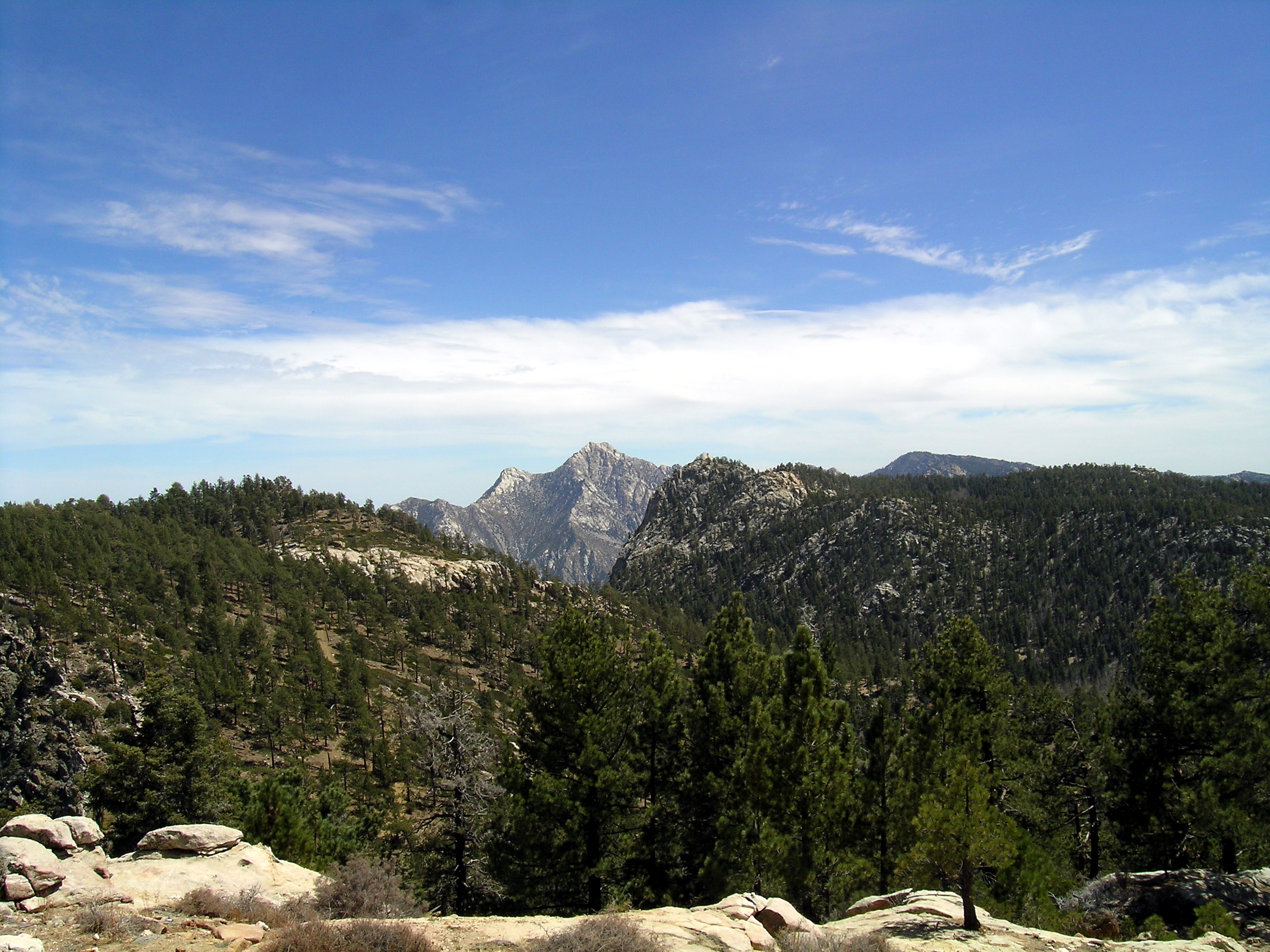
Picacho del Diablo

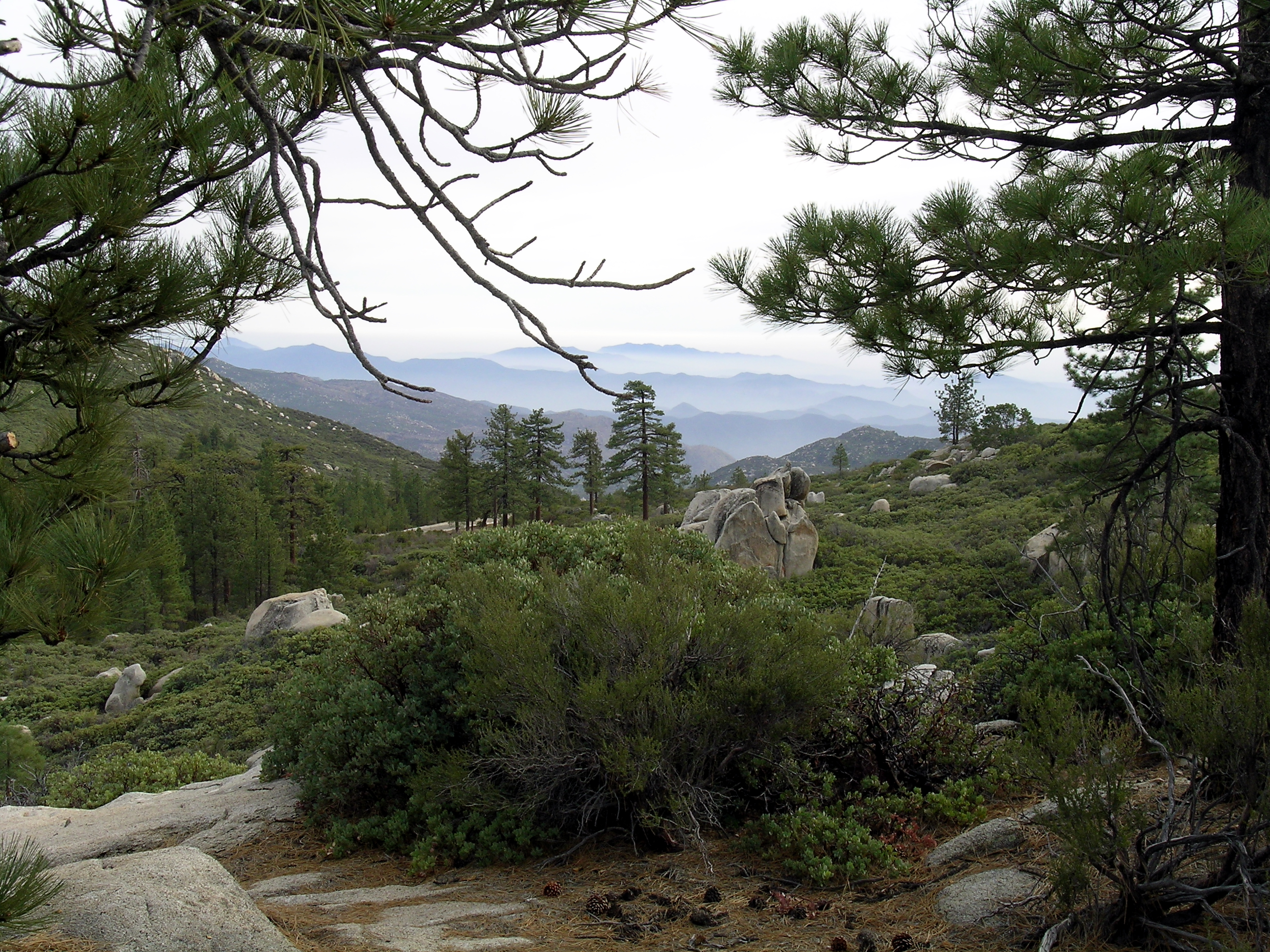
Flora on the east side of the Sierra de San Pedro Mártir

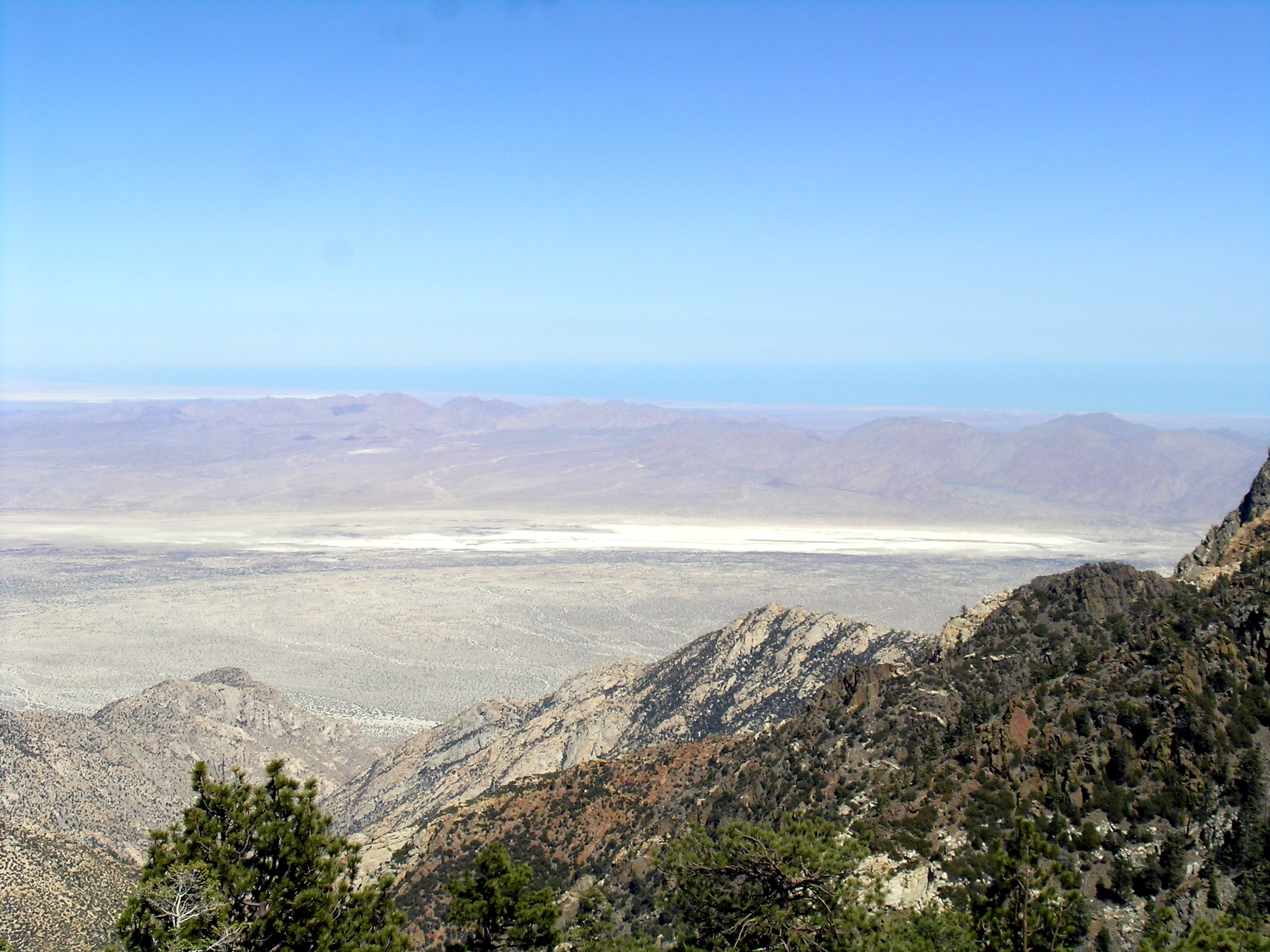
View of the San Felipe Desert and the Gulf of California below from the high elevations from Sierra de San Pedro Mártir

Conifers are predominant at higher elevations of the Sierra de San Pedro Mártir. The most abundant are: Pinus lambertiana, Pinus quadrifolia, Pinus jeffreyi, Abies concolor, and Tecate cypress (Hesperocyparis forbesii). The critically endangered San Pedro Mártir cypress (Hesperocyparis montana) is endemic to the Siera de San Pedro Mártir. Oaks grow with conifers at middle elevations. The montane forest flora is distinct from the flora of the rest of Mexico, and shares many species with the Laguna Mountains and San Jacinto Mountains in southwest California. The lower elevations of the Sierra de San Pedro Mártir are defined by chaparral and desert shrub. Sierra de San Pedro Mártir is a southern demarcation of the distribution of the California fan palm, Washingtonia filifera.

Throughout the park there are a great variety of mammals: mule deer, bighorn sheep, cougar, bobcat, ringtail cat, coyote, rabbit, squirrel and more than 30 species of bats. The park is also home to many avian species like: bald eagle, golden eagle, falcon, woodpecker, black vulture, crow, several species of Sittidae. Captive-born California condor have been re-introduced to the wild in the Sierra San Pedro Martir, the first time they have been seen in the range since 1937. The condor was introduced into the park with international cooperation between the United States and Mexico. Local ecologists named the second generation of Californian condors "inyaa" (sun in the Kiliwa language).

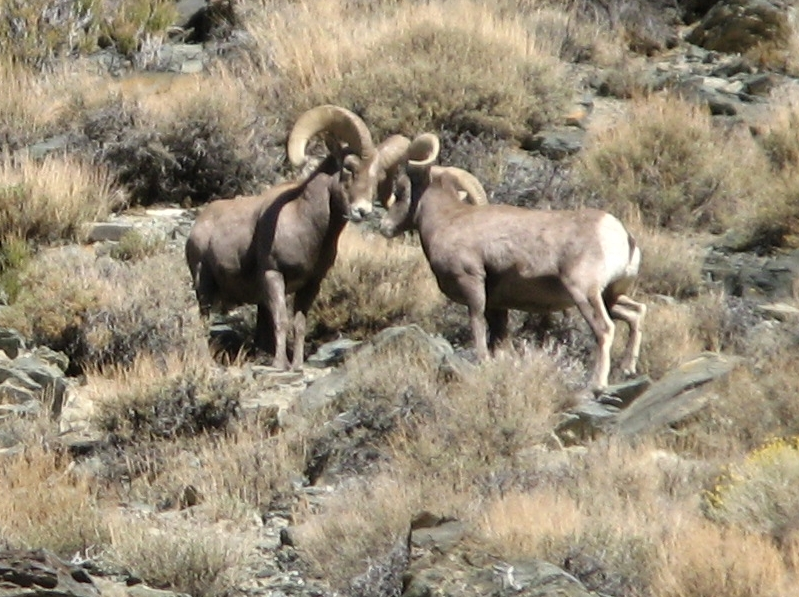
Bighorn sheep

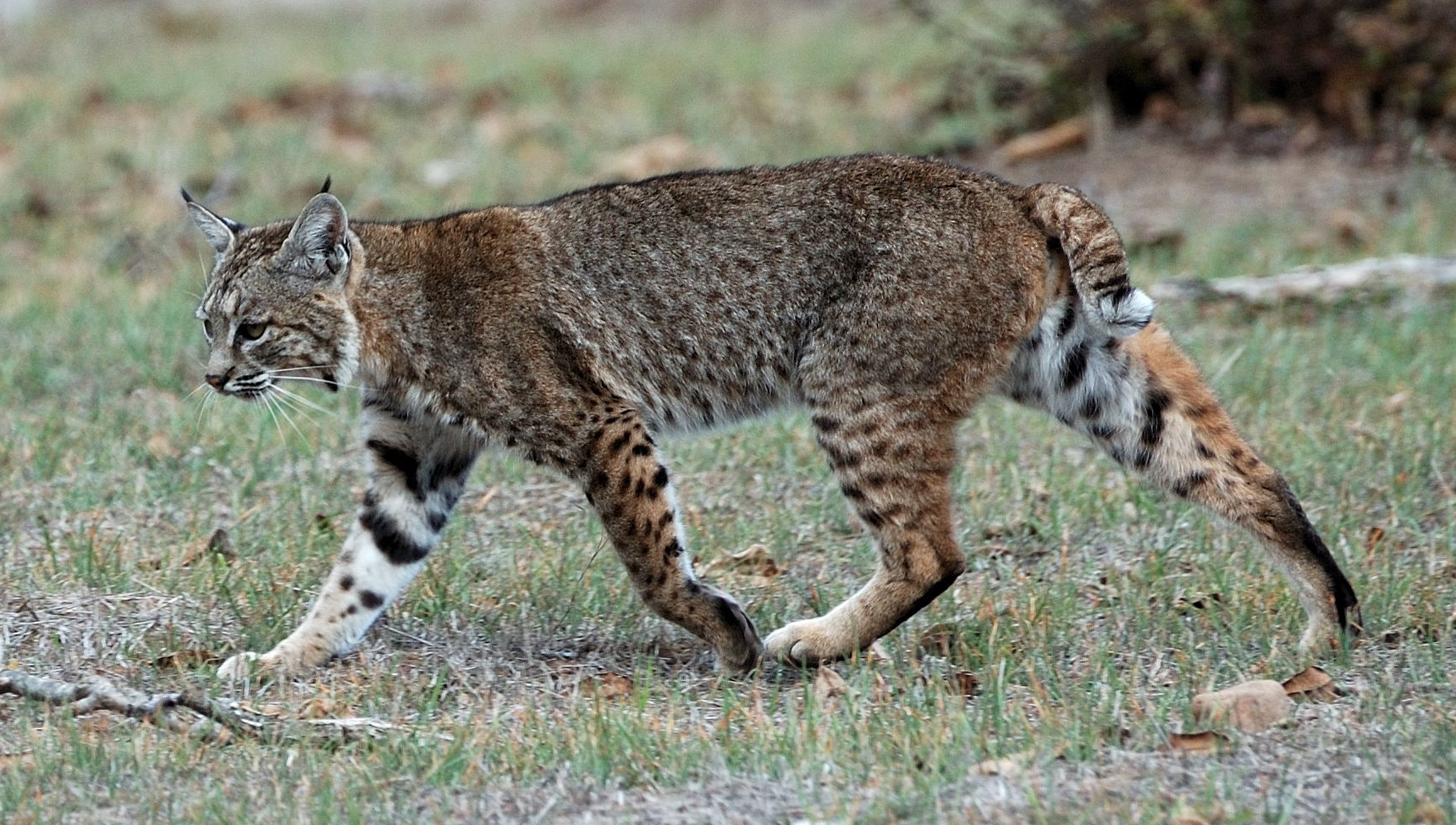
Bobcat

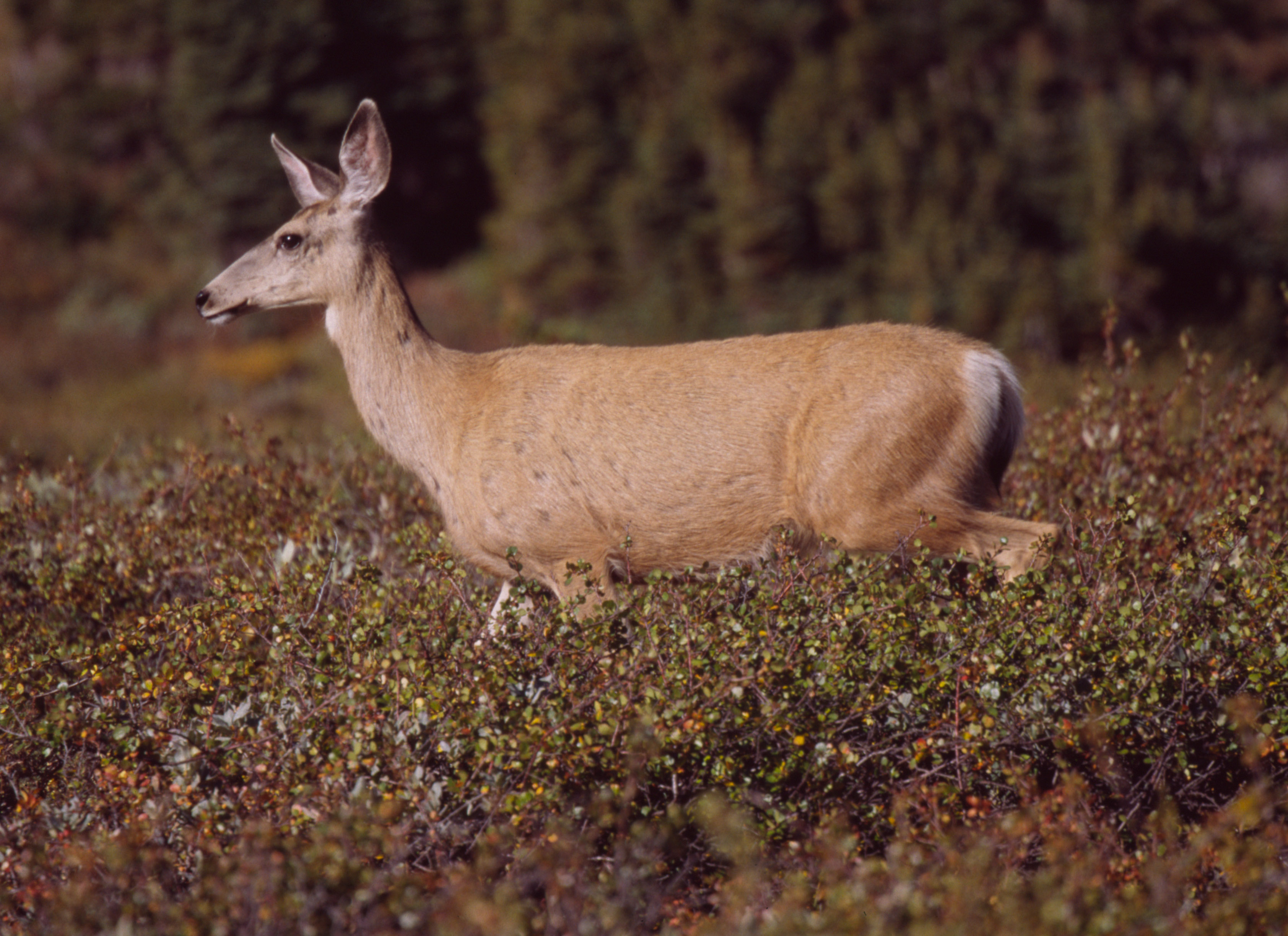
Mule deer

== Bibliography ==
Vargas Márquez, Fernando. 1984. Parques Nacionales de México y Reservas Equivalentes. Pasado, presente y futuro. Los Bosques de México. Instituto de Investigaciones Económicas. UNAM. México, D.F. 266 páginas.
