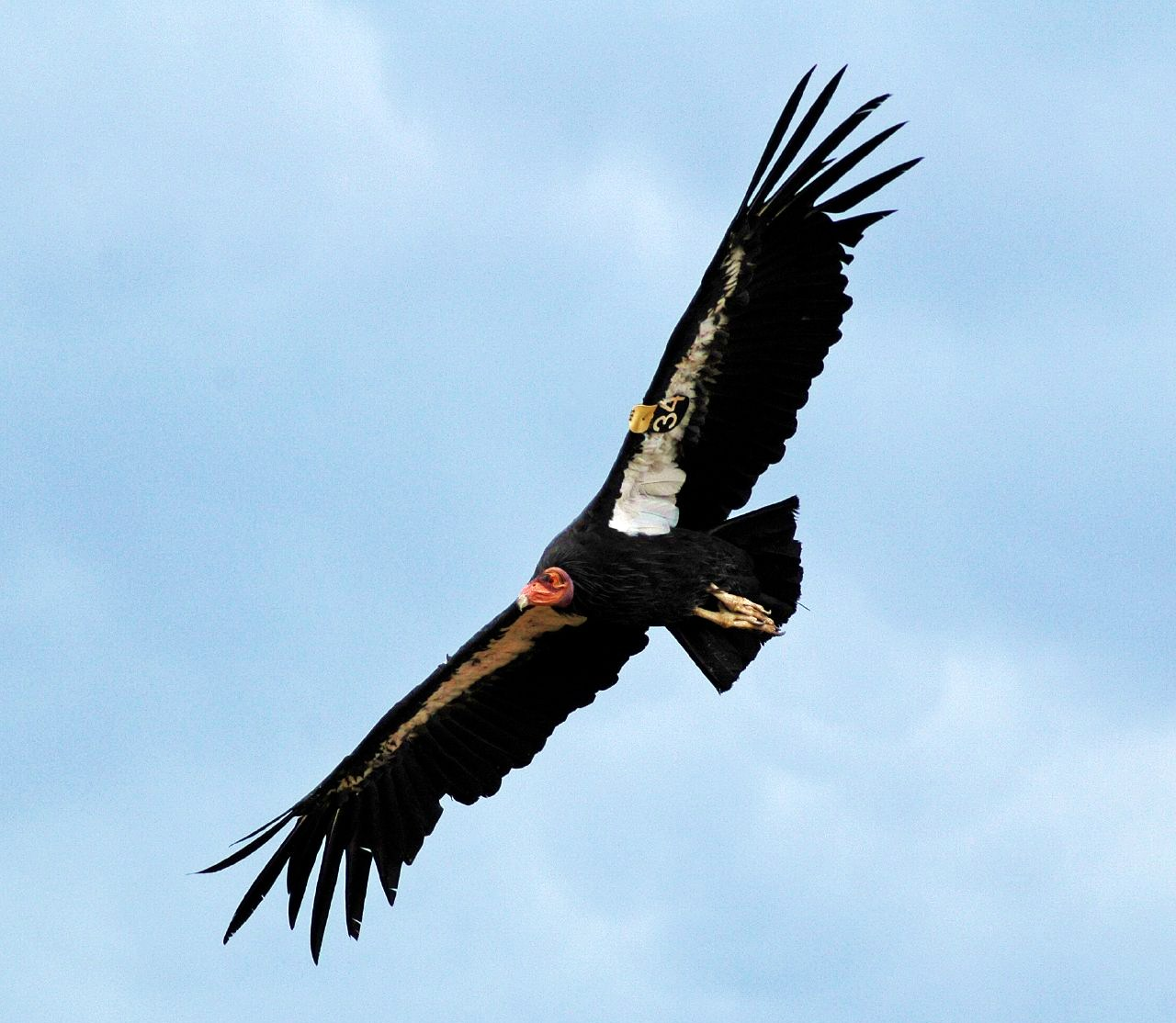
- Condor #534 in 2006

Conservation status
- Critically Endangered (IUCN 3.1)
- CITES Appendix I

Scientific classification
- Kingdom: Animalia
- Phylum: Chordata
- Class: Aves
- Order: Cathartiformes
- Family: Cathartidae
- Genus: Gymnogyps
- Species: G. californianus

Binomial name
- Gymnogyps californianus (Shaw, 1797)
- Range map of California condor: Extant (resident) Possibly extinct

Synonyms
- Genus-level: Antillovultur Arredondo, 1971; Pseudogryphus Ridgway, 1874; Species-level: Vultur californianus Shaw, 1797

= California condor =

California condor Temporal range: 2.5–0 Ma Early Pleistocene – Holocene

Species of large New World vulture

The California condor (Gymnogyps californianus) is a New World vulture and the largest North American land bird. It became extinct in the wild in 1987 when all remaining wild individuals were captured, but has since been reintroduced to northern Arizona and southern Utah (including the Grand Canyon area and Zion National Park), the coastal mountains of California, and northern Baja California in Mexico. It is the only surviving member of the genus Gymnogyps, although four extinct members of the genus are also known. The species is listed by IUCN as critically endangered, and similarly considered Critically Imperiled by NatureServe.

The plumage is black with patches of white on the underside of the wings; the head is largely bald, with skin color ranging from gray on young birds to yellow and bright orange on breeding adults. Its 3.0 m (9.8 ft) wingspan is the widest of any North American bird, and its weight of up to 14 kg (31 lb) nearly equals that of the trumpeter swan, the heaviest among native North American bird species. The condor is a scavenger and eats large amounts of carrion. It is one of the world's longest-living birds, with a lifespan of up to 60 years.

Condor numbers dramatically declined in the 20th century due to agricultural chemicals (DDT), poaching, lead poisoning, and habitat destruction. A conservation plan put in place by the United States government led to the capture of all the remaining wild condors by 1987, with a total population of 27 individuals. These surviving birds were bred at the San Diego Wild Animal Park and the Los Angeles Zoo. Numbers rose through captive breeding, and beginning in 1991, condors were reintroduced into the wild. Since then, their population has grown, but the California condor remains one of the world's rarest bird species. In December 2025, the Fish and Wildlife Service updated the world population to 607. The condor is a significant bird to many Californian Native American groups and plays an important role in several of their traditional myths.

== Taxonomy ==
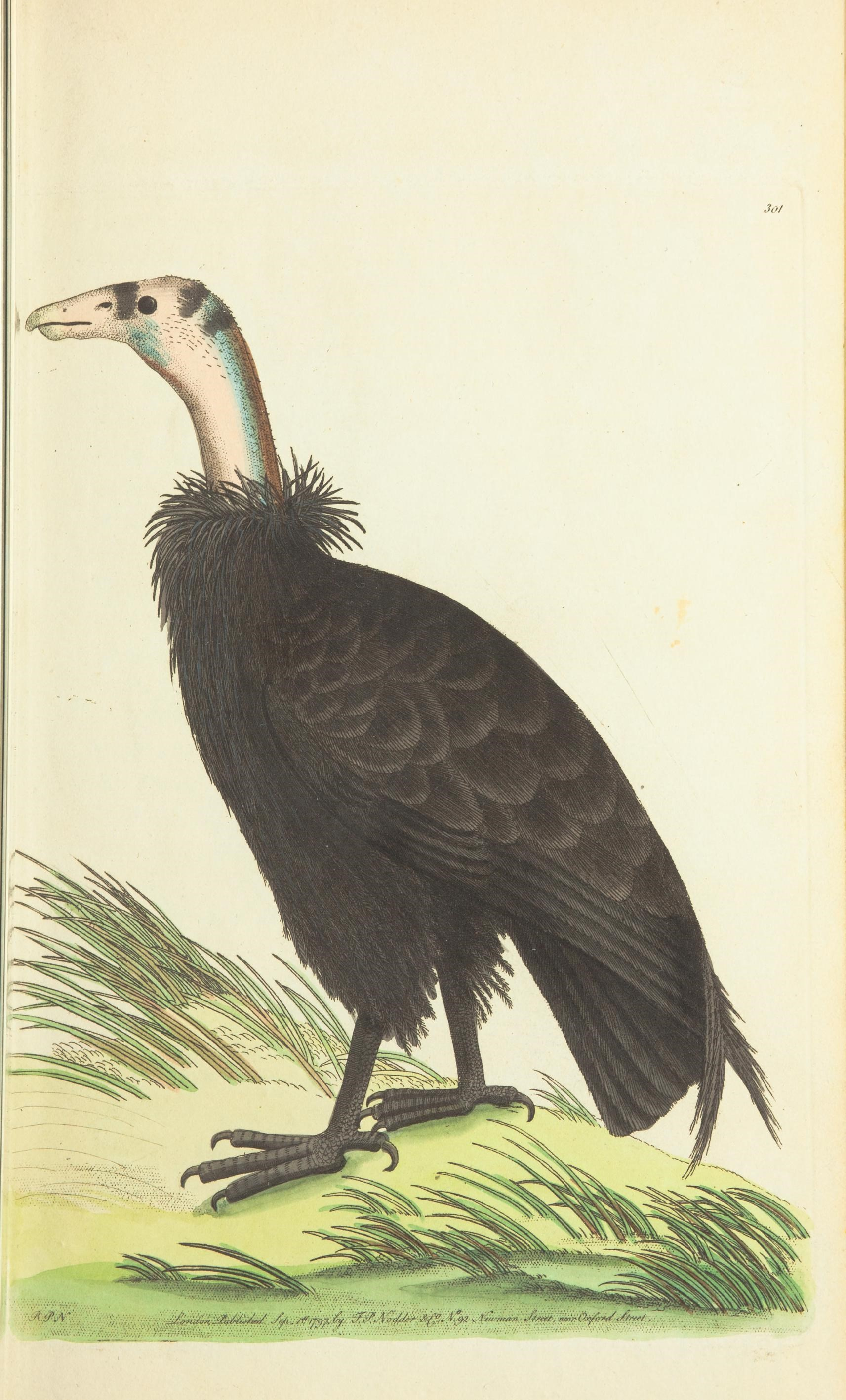
Frederick Polydore Nodder's illustration accompanying George Shaw's 1797 species description

The California condor was described by English naturalist George Shaw in 1797 as Vultur californianus; Archibald Menzies collected the type specimen "from the coast of California" during the Vancouver Expedition. It was originally classified in the same genus as the Andean condor (V. gryphus), but, due to the Andean condor's slightly different markings, slightly longer wings, and tendency to kill small animals to eat, the California condor has been placed in its own monotypic genus. The generic name Gymnogyps is derived from the Greek gymnos/γυμνος "naked" or "bare", and gyps/γυψ "vulture", while the specific name californianus comes from its location in California. The word condor itself is derived from the Quechua word kuntur.

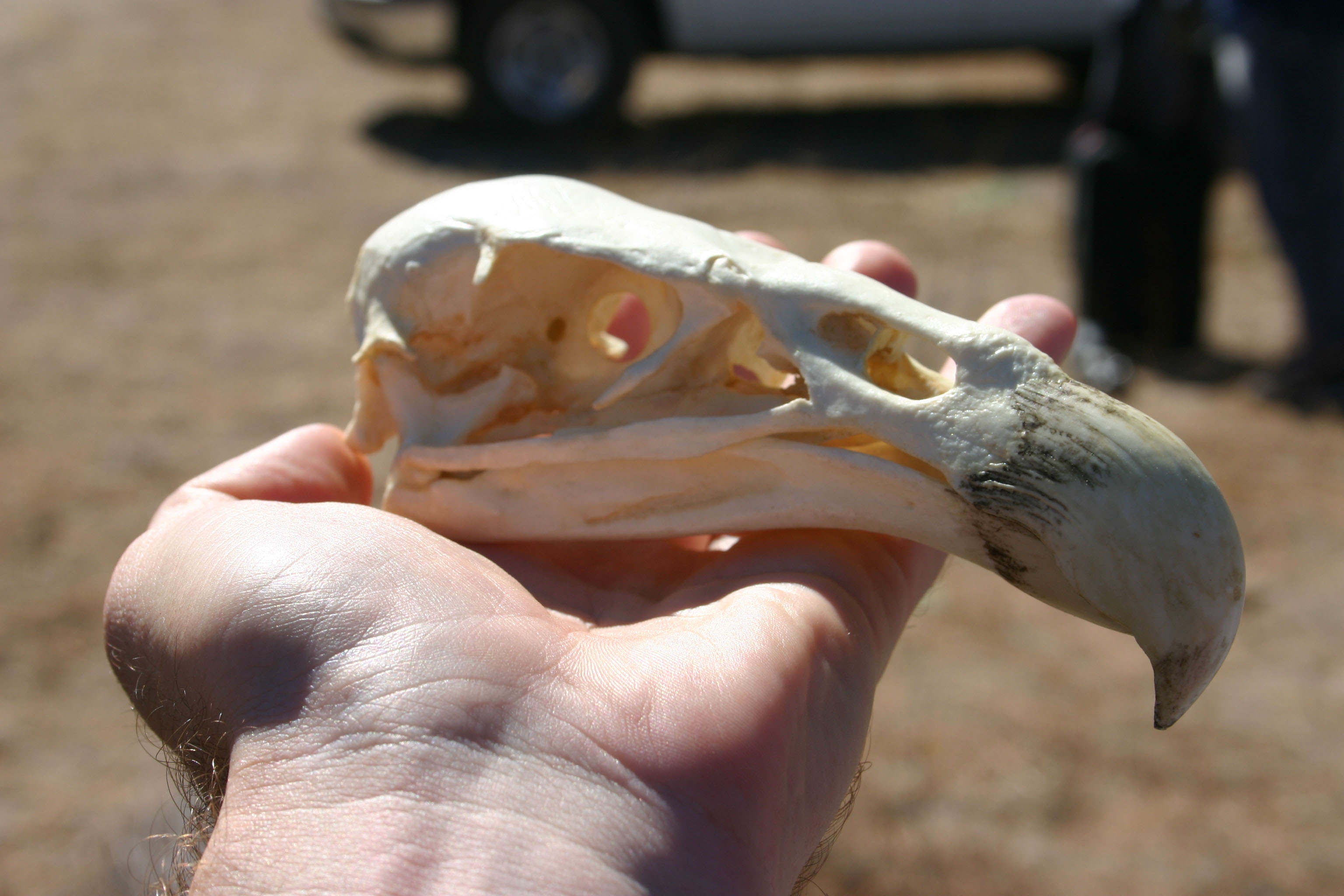
A California condor skull

The exact taxonomic placement of the California condor and the other six species of New World vultures remains unclear. Though similar in appearance and ecological roles to Old World vultures, the New World vultures evolved from a different ancestor in a different part of the world. Just how different the two are is under debate, with some earlier authorities suggesting that the New World vultures are more closely related to storks. More recent authorities maintain their overall position in the order Falconiformes along with the Old World vultures or place them in their own order, Cathartiformes. The South American Classification Committee has removed the New World vultures from Ciconiiformes and instead placed them in Incertae sedis, but notes that a move to Falconiformes or Cathartiformes is possible.

As of the 51st Supplement (2010) of the American Ornithologists' Union, the California condor is in the family Cathartidae of the order Cathartiformes.

=== Evolutionary history ===
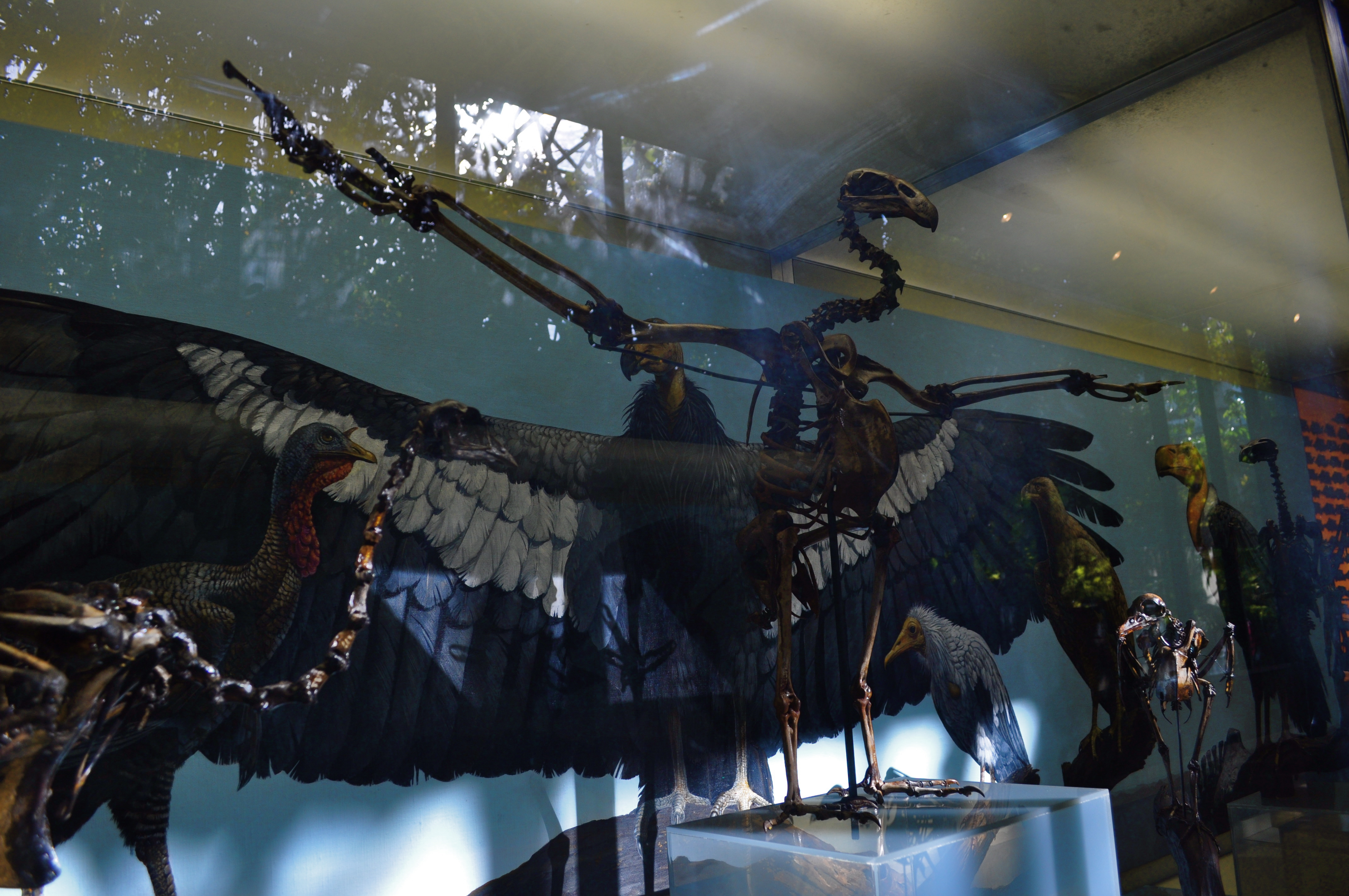
Fossil of the extinct species Gymnogyps amplus from the La Brea Tar Pits

The genus Gymnogyps is an example of a relict distribution. During the Pleistocene Epoch, this genus was widespread across the Americas. From fossils, the Floridian Gymnogyps kofordi from the Early Pleistocene and the Peruvian Gymnogyps howardae from the Late Pleistocene have been described. A condor found in Late Pleistocene deposits on Cuba was initially described as Antillovultur varonai, but has since been recognized as another member of Gymnogyps, Gymnogyps varonai. It may even have derived from a founder population of California condors.

The California condor is the sole surviving member of Gymnogyps and has no accepted subspecies. However, there is a Late Pleistocene form that is sometimes regarded as a palaeosubspecies, Gymnogyps californianus amplus. Opinions are mixed, regarding the classification of the form as either a chronospecies or a separate species, Gymnogyps amplus. Gymnogyps amplus occurred over much of the bird's historical range – even extending into Florida – but was larger, having about the same weight as the Andean condor. This bird also had a wider bill. As the climate changed during the last ice age, the entire population may have become smaller until it had evolved into the Gymnogyps californianus of today, although more recent studies by Syverson question that theory.

== Description ==
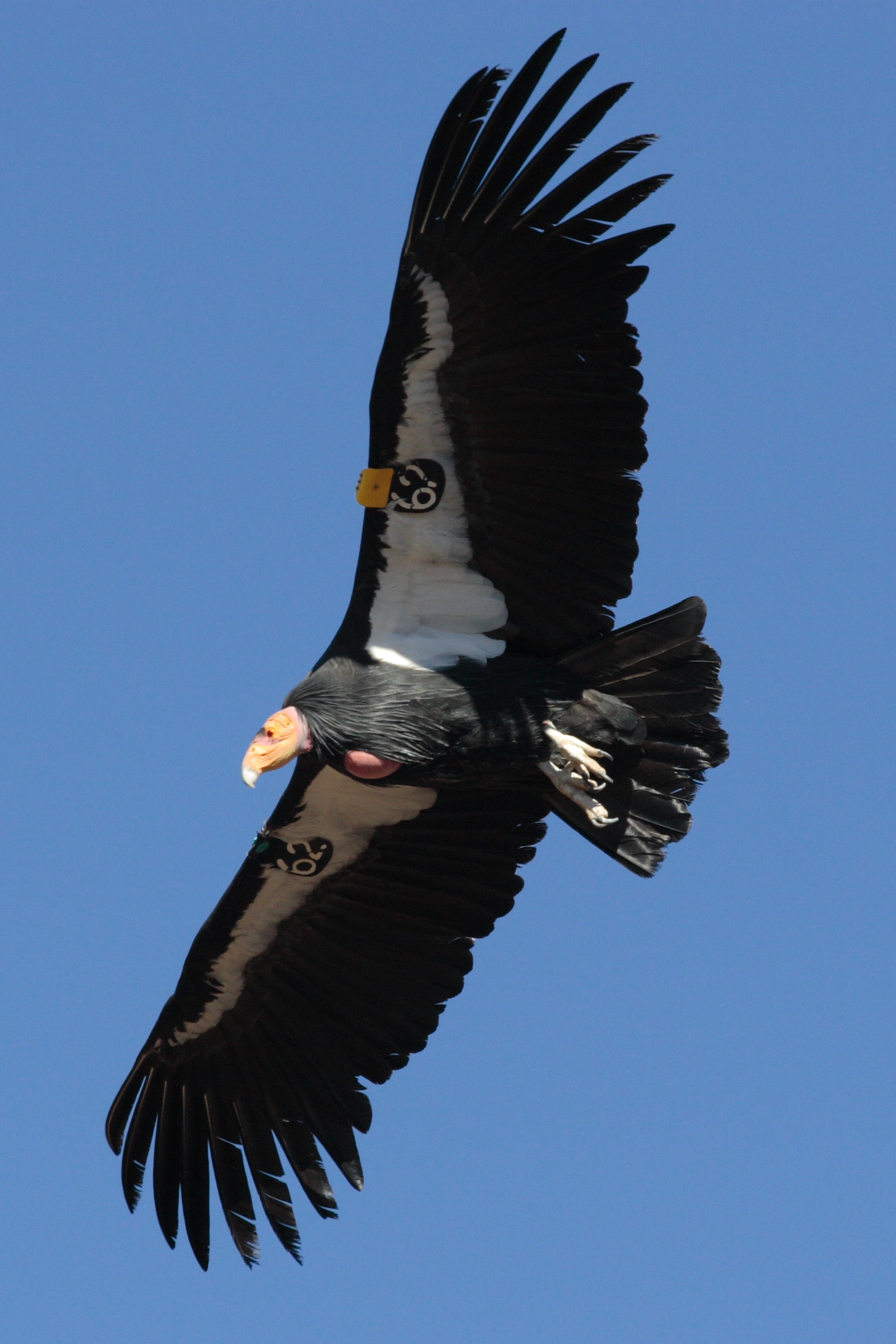
An adult in flight. Tracking tags can be seen on both wings.

The adult California condor is a uniform black with the exception of large triangular patches or bands of white on the underside of the wings. It has gray legs and feet, an ivory-colored bill, a frill of black feathers surrounding the base of the neck, and brownish red eyes. The juvenile is mostly a mottled dark brown with blackish coloration on the head. It has mottled gray instead of white on the underside of its flight feathers.

The condor's head has little to no feathers, which helps keep it clean when feeding on carrion. The skin of the head and neck is capable of flushing noticeably in response to emotional state. The skin color varies from yellowish to a glowing reddish-orange. The birds do not have true syringeal vocalizations. They can make a few hissing or grunting sounds only heard when very close.

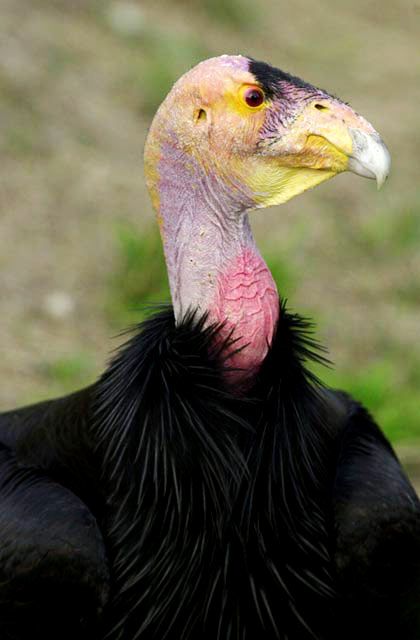
The upper body and head

The female condor is smaller than the male, an exception to the rule among birds of prey (the related Andean condor is another exception). Overall length ranges from 109 to 140 cm (43 to 55 in) and wingspan from 2.49 to 3 m (8 ft 2 in to 9 ft 10 in). Their weight ranges from 7 to 14.1 kg (15 to 31 lb), with estimations of average weight ranging from 8 to 9 kg (18 to 20 lb). Wingspans of up to 3.4 m (11 ft) have been reported but no wingspan over 3.05 m (10.0 ft) has been verified. Most measurements are from birds raised in captivity, so it is difficult to determine if major differences exist between wild and captive condors.

California condors have the largest wingspan of any North American bird. They are surpassed in both body length and weight only by the trumpeter swan and the introduced mute swan. The American white pelican and whooping crane also have longer bodies than the condor. Condors are so large that they can be mistaken for a small, distant airplane, which possibly occurs more often than that they are mistaken for other bird species.

The middle toe of the California condor's foot is greatly elongated, and the hind toe is only slightly developed. The talons of all the toes are straight and blunt and are thus more adapted to walking than gripping. This is more similar to their supposed relatives the storks than to birds of prey and Old World vultures, which use their feet as weapons or organs of prehension.

== Historic range ==
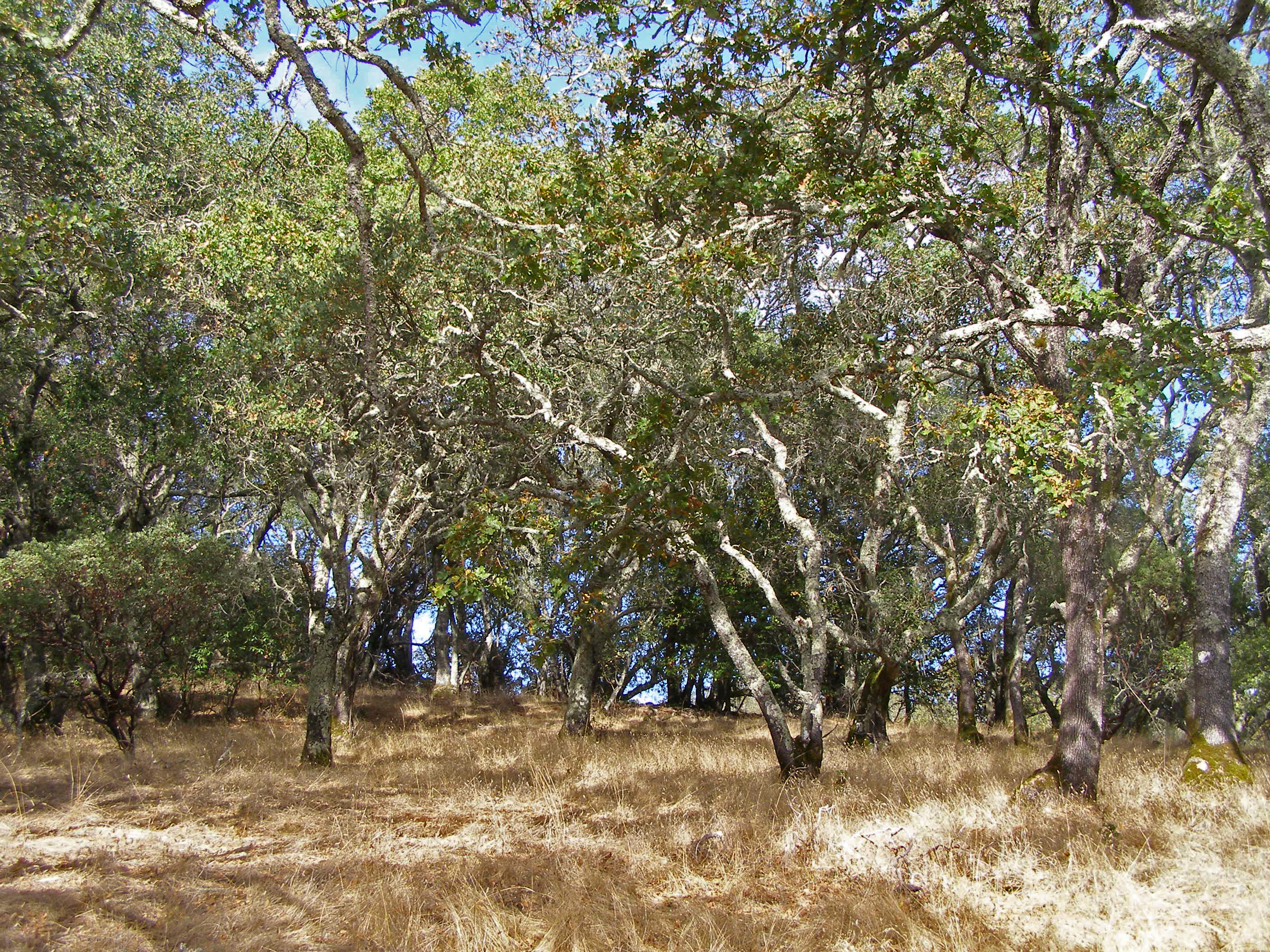
California oak savanna on the east flank of Sonoma Mountain

At the time of human settlement of the Americas, the California condor was widespread across North America; condor bones from the late Pleistocene have been found at the Cutler Fossil Site in southern Florida. However, at the end of the last glacial period came the extinction of the megafauna that led to a subsequent reduction in range and population. Five hundred years ago, the California condor roamed across the American Southwest and West Coast. Faunal remains of condors have been found documented in Arizona, Nevada, New Mexico, and Texas.

The Lewis and Clark Expedition of the early 19th century reported on their sighting and shooting of California condors near the mouth of the Columbia River. The species was observed as far north as Lulu Island, British Columbia in the late 1880s; it was described as once being "common" in the area up until that point. Its 19th century presence at the mouth of the Fraser River was corroborated by John Keast Lord.

In the 1970s, two Condor Observation Sites were established in the Santa Clara River Valley to host hopeful birders interested in the endangered species: one about 15 miles north of Fillmore, California, near the Sespe Wildlife Area of Los Padres National Forest, and one atop Mount Pinos, "accessible from a dirt road off the highway in from Gorman".

== Habitat ==
The California condor lives in rocky shrubland, coniferous forest, and oak savanna. They are often found near cliffs or large trees, which they use as nesting sites. Individual birds have a huge range and have been known to travel up to 250 km (160 mi) in search of carrion.

There are two sanctuaries chosen because of their prime condor nesting habitat: the Sisquoc Condor Sanctuary in the San Rafael Wilderness and the Sespe Condor Sanctuary in the Los Padres National Forest.

The Los Padres Condor Range and River Protection Act of 1992 expanded existing wilderness by 34,200 hectares (84,400 acres) and designated 127,900 hectares (316,050 acres) of new wilderness that provide habitat for the condor in the Los Padres.

== Ecology and behavior ==
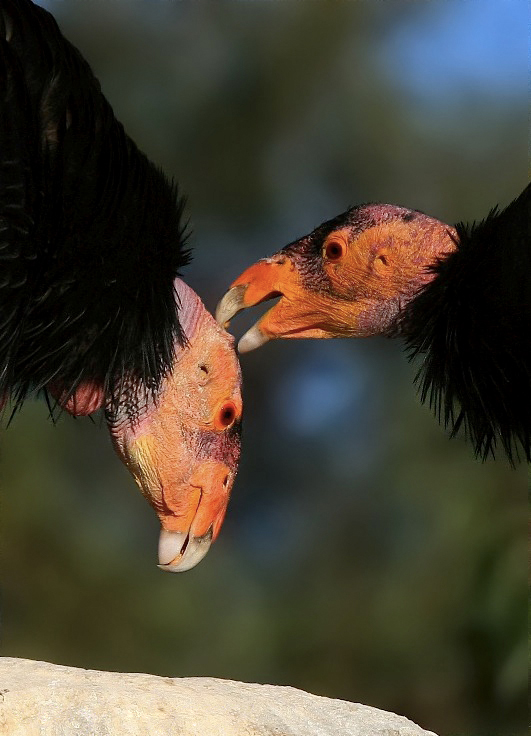
Preening condors

The California condor's large flight muscles are not anchored by a correspondingly large sternum, which restricts them to being primarily soarers. The birds flap their wings when taking off from the ground, but after attaining a moderate elevation they largely glide, sometimes going for miles without a single flap of their wings. They have been known to fly up to speeds of 90 km/h (56 mph) and as high as 4,600 m (15,100 ft). They prefer to roost on high perches from which they can launch without any major wing-flapping effort. Often, these birds are seen soaring near rock cliffs, using thermals to aid them in keeping aloft.

The California condor has a long life span, reaching up to 60 years. If it survives to adulthood, the condor has few natural threats other than humans. Because they lack a syrinx, their vocal display is limited to grunts and hisses. Condors bathe frequently and can spend hours a day preening their feathers. Condors also perform urohidrosis, defecation on their legs, to reduce their body temperature. There is a well-developed social structure within large groups of condors, with competition to determine a pecking order decided by body language, competitive play behavior, and a variety of hisses and grunts. This social hierarchy is displayed especially when the birds feed, with the dominant birds eating before the younger ones.

=== Breeding ===
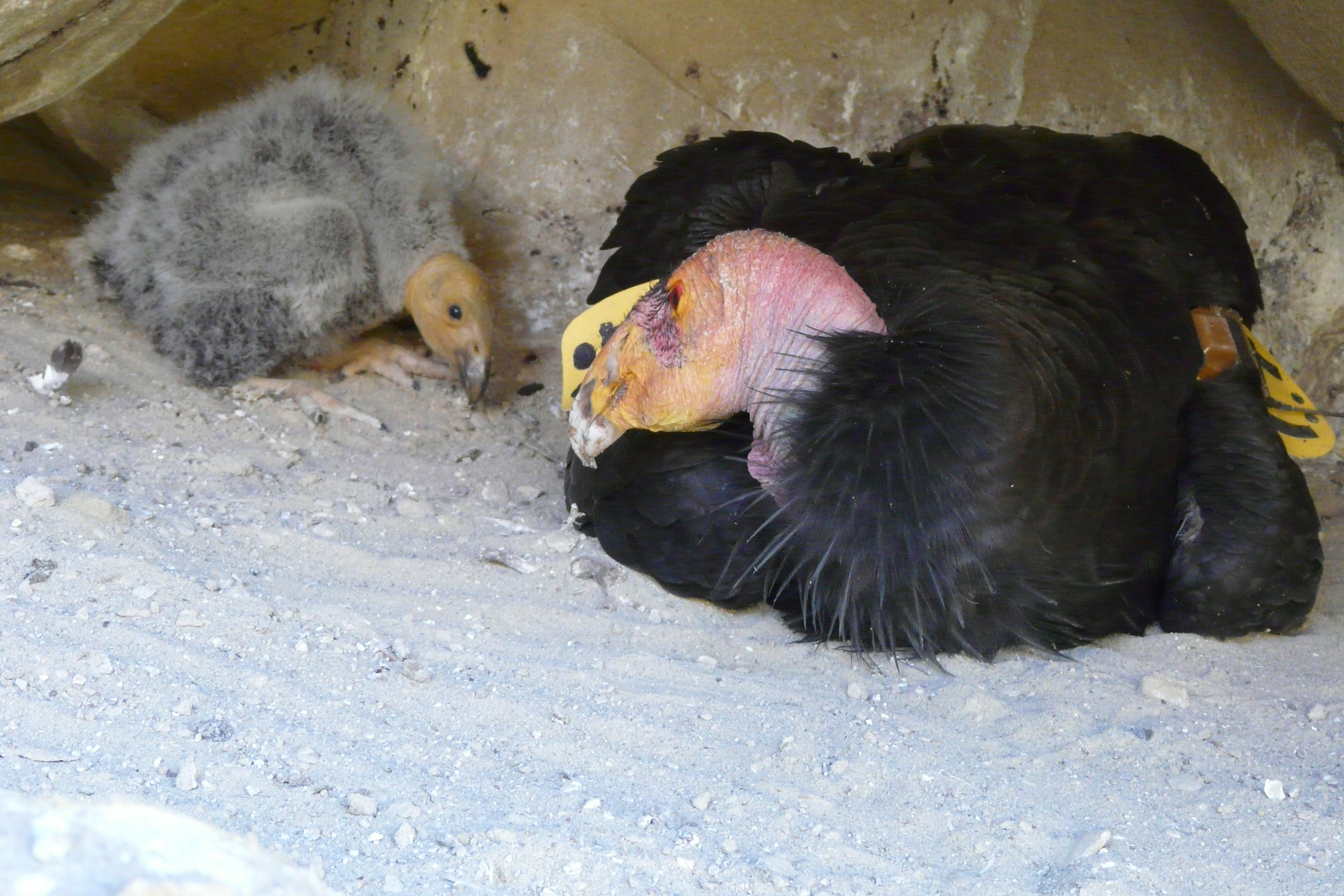
An adult with a 30-day-old chick in a cave nest near the Hopper Mountain National Wildlife Refuge, California, U.S.

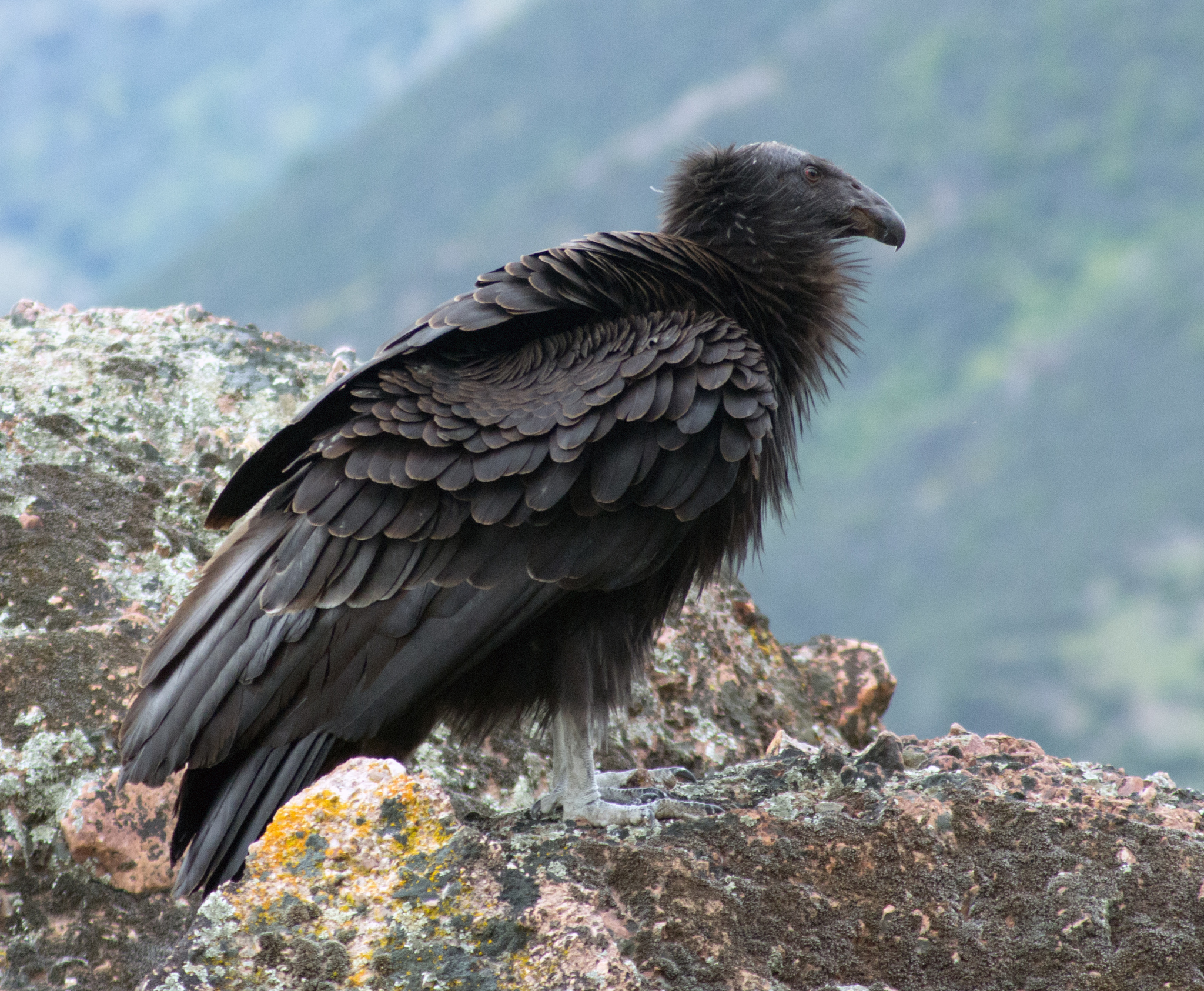
3 year old male, in California

Condors begin to look for a mate when they reach sexual maturity at the age of 6. To attract a prospective mate, the male condor performs a display, in which the male turns his head red and puffs out his neck feathers. He then spreads his wings and slowly approaches the female. If the female lowers her head to accept the male, the condors become mates for life. The pair makes a simple nest in caves or on cliff clefts, especially ones with nearby roosting trees and open spaces for landing. A mated female lays one bluish-white egg every other year. Eggs are laid as early as January to as late as April. The egg weighs about 280 grams (10 oz) and measures from 90 to 120 mm (3.5 to 4.7 in) in length and about 67 mm (2.6 in) in width. If the chick or egg is lost or removed, the parents "double clutch", or lay another egg to take the lost one's place. Researchers and breeders take advantage of this behavior to double the reproductive rate by taking the first egg away for puppet-rearing; this induces the parents to lay a second (or even third) egg, which the condors are sometimes allowed to raise.

The eggs hatch after 53 to 60 days of incubation by both parents. Chicks are born with their eyes open and sometimes can take up to a week to leave the shell completely. The young are covered with a grayish down until they are almost as large as their parents. They are able to fly after 5 to 6 months, but continue to roost and forage with their parents until they are in their second year, at which point the parents typically turn their energies to a new nest. Ravens are the main predatory threat to condor eggs, while golden eagles and bears are potential predators of condor offspring.

In 2021, the San Diego Zoo reported having had two unfertilized eggs hatch within its breeding program in 2001 and 2009, producing male young by parthenogenesis as indicated by genetic studies. The mothers had been housed with males and had mated before, but the offspring lacked markers of male paternity and showed all-maternal inheritance, suggesting the specific mechanism of parthenogenesis involved automixis, gametic fusion, or endomitosis. Earlier evidence of similar parthenogenesis in birds found that among the known examples the embryos died before hatching, unlike these condor chicks. Neither chick lived to sexual maturity, preventing data collection on their reproductive potential.

In July 2024, the LA Zoo reported that a record-setting 17 California condor chicks hatched during the year's breeding season, crediting the surge on novel breeding and rearing techniques developed by their condor team. The technique involves introducing 2 to 3 chicks to a single surrogate mature condor who raises them. Due to the endangered status of the California condor, all 17 chicks are to be released into the wild.

=== Feeding ===
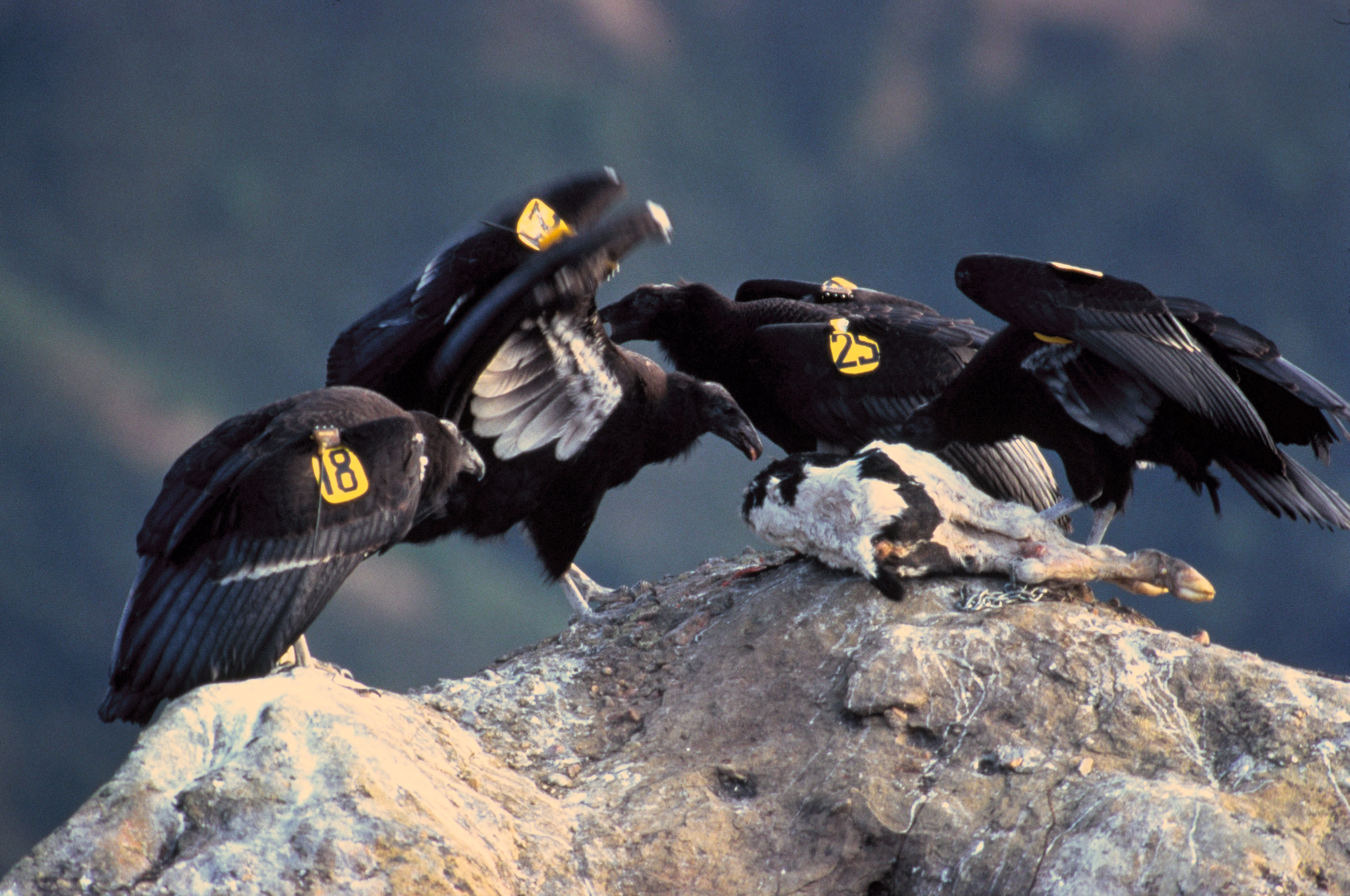
Juveniles feeding

Wild condors maintain a large home range, often traveling 250 km (160 mi) a day in search of carrion. It is thought that in the early days of its existence as a species, the California condor lived off the carcasses of the Pleistocene megafauna, which are largely extinct in North America. They still prefer to feast on large, terrestrial mammalian carcasses such as deer, goats, sheep, donkeys, horses, pigs, cougars, bears, or cattle. Alternatively, they may feed on the bodies of smaller mammals such as rabbits, squirrels, and coyotes, aquatic mammals such as whales and California sea lions, or salmon. Bird and reptile carcasses are rarely eaten. Condors prefer fresh kills, but they also eat decayed food when necessary. Since they do not have a sense of smell, they spot these corpses by looking for other scavengers, like eagles and smaller vultures, the latter of which cannot rip through the tougher hides of these larger animals with the efficiency of the larger condor. They can usually intimidate other scavengers away from the carcass, with the exception of bears, which will ignore them, and golden eagles, which will fight a condor over a kill or a carcass. In the wild they are intermittent eaters, often going for between a few days to two weeks without eating, then gorging themselves on 1–1.5 kilograms (2.2–3.3 lb) of meat at once.

== Conservation ==
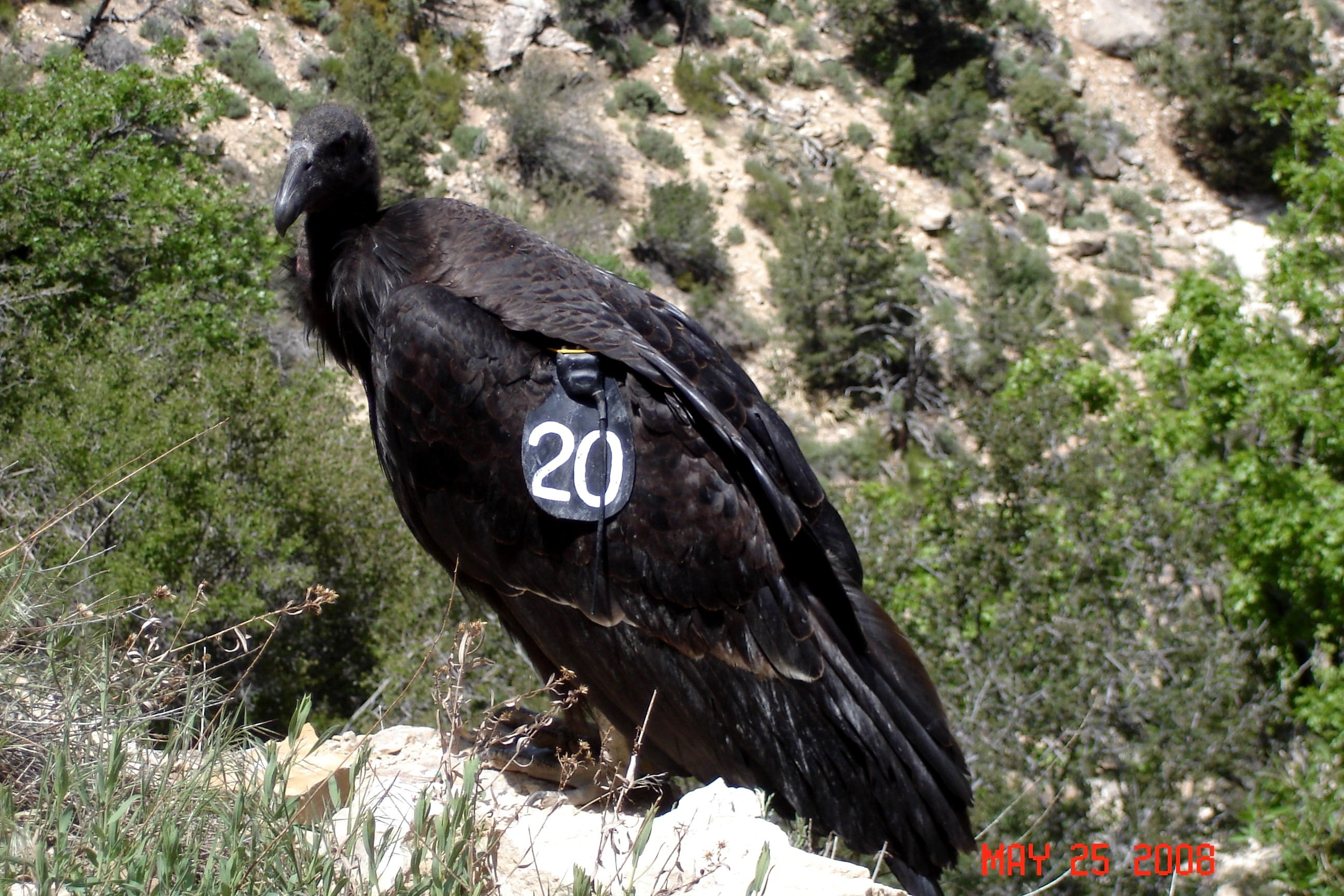
A juvenile in the Grand Canyon, with its numbered tag prominent.

The California condor conservation project may be one of the most expensive species conservation projects in United States history, costing over $35 million, including $20 million in federal and state funding, since World War II. As of 2007, the annual cost for the condor conservation program was around $2.0 million per year. Successful reintroduction of captive-bred condors into the wild has become a multi-step and complex process, fraught with the need to periodically recapture the birds to test for lead poisoning and sometimes the necessity for lead removal by chelation.

=== Recovery plan ===
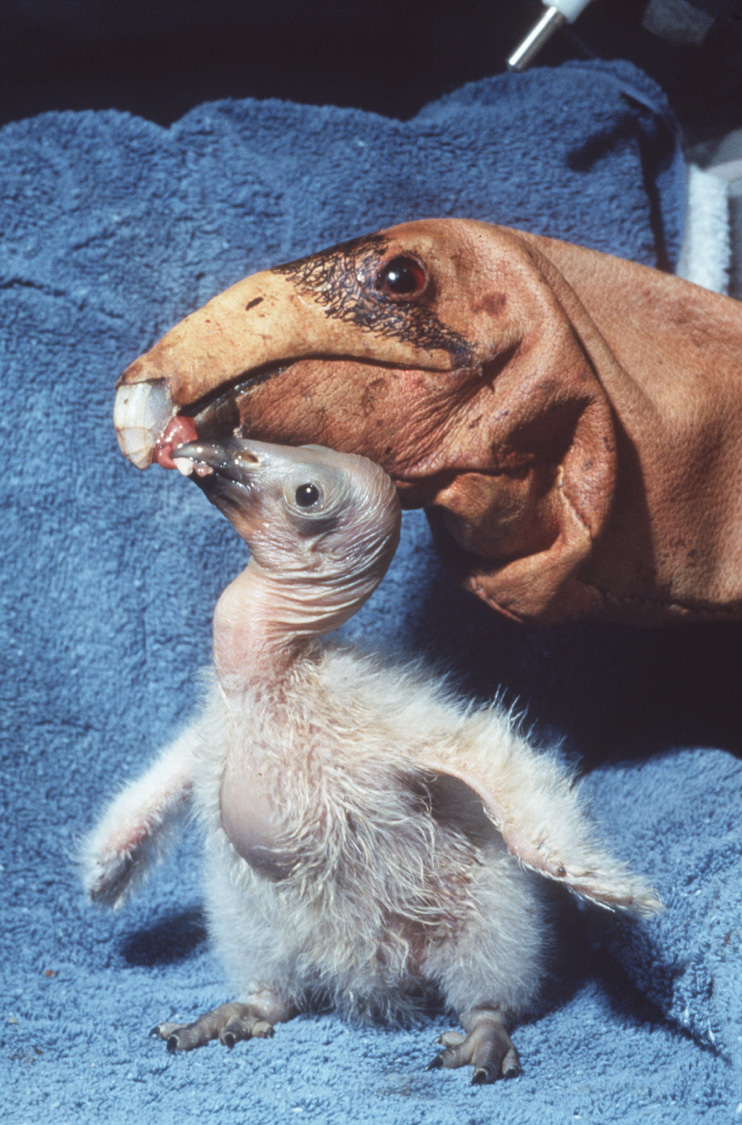
A condor chick being fed by a condor head feeding puppet

As the condor's population continued to decline, discussion began about starting a captive breeding program for the birds. Opponents to this plan argued that the condors had the right to freedom and that capturing all of the condors would change the species' habits forever, and that the cost was too great. The project received the approval of the United States government, and the U.S. Fish and Wildlife service established the California Condor Recovery Program in 1979. The capture of the remaining wild condors was completed on Easter Sunday 1987, when AC-9, the last wild condor, was captured. At that point, there were only 22 surviving condors, all of them in captivity. The goal of the California Condor Recovery Plan was to establish two geographically separate populations, one in California and the other in Arizona, each with 150 birds and at least 15 breeding pairs.

The study and capture of the remaining California condors was made possible through the efforts of Jan Hamber, an ornithologist with the Santa Barbara Museum of Natural History. Hamber personally captured AC-9, the final wild California condor, and her dedication to the bird's conservation led her to compile decades of field notes into the Condor Archives, a searchable database focused on condor biology and conservation.

The captive breeding program, led by the San Diego Wild Animal Park and Los Angeles Zoo, and later joined by the Oregon Zoo, and The Peregrine Fund World Center for Birds of Prey in Boise, ID, got off to a slow start due to the condor's mating habits. However, utilizing the bird's ability to double clutch, biologists began removing the first egg from the nest and raising it with puppets (or other parent condors) allowing the parents to lay another egg.

Aside from breeding programs, the Condor Recovery Center at Oakland Zoo treats condors that are ill from lead poisoning.

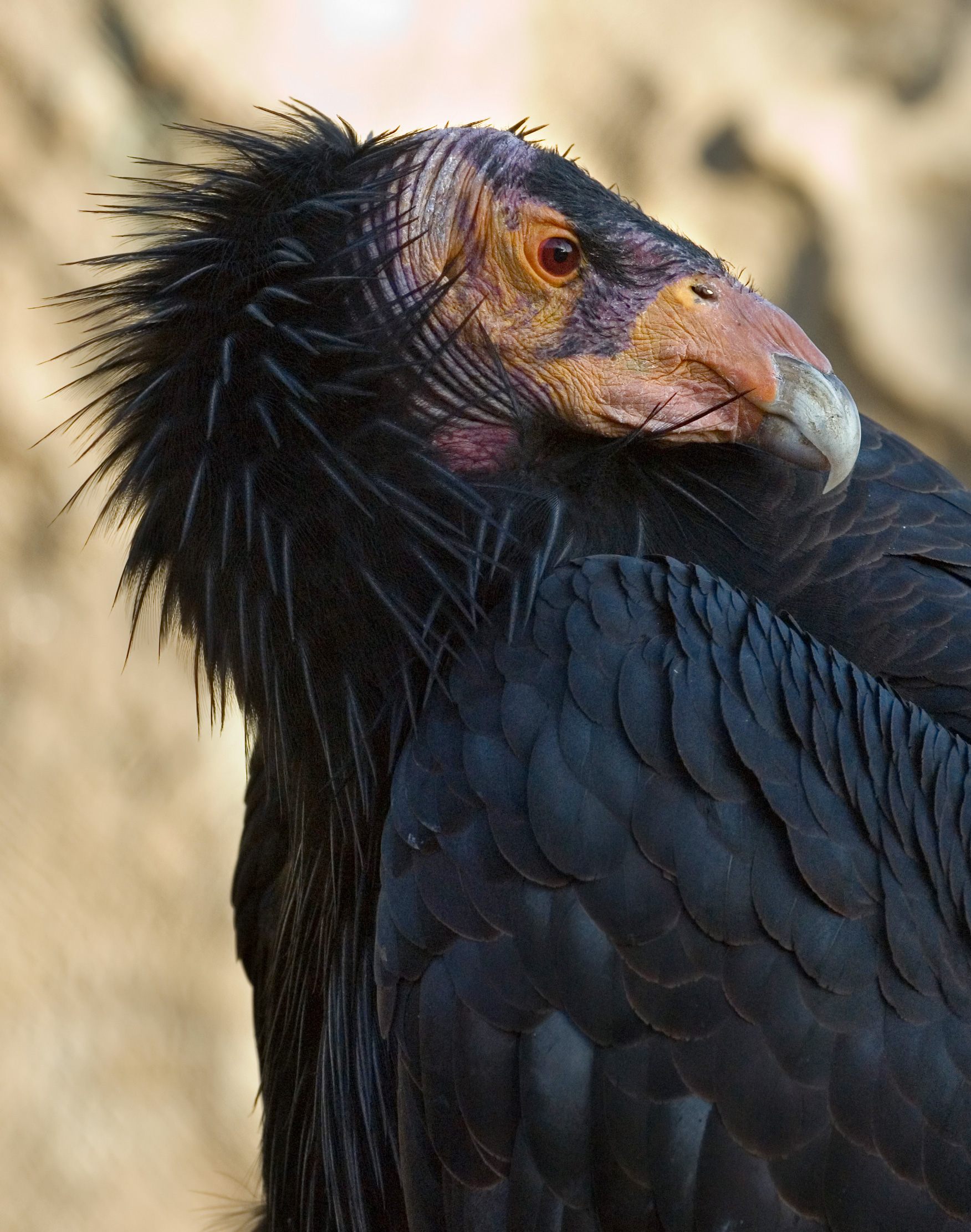
The California condor once numbered only 22 birds, but conservation measures have raised that number to over 600 today.

=== Reintroduction to the wild ===
In 1988, the United States Fish and Wildlife Service began a reintroduction experiment involving the release of captive Andean condors into the wild in California. Only females were released, to eliminate the possibility of accidentally introducing a South American species into the United States. The experiment was a success, and all the Andean condors were recaptured and re-released in South America. California condors were released in 1991 and 1992 in California at Big Sur, Pinnacles National Park and Bitter Creek National Wildlife Refuge and in 1996 at the Vermilion Cliffs release site in Arizona near the Grand Canyon. The Fish and Wildlife Service designated the Arizona condors as an experimental, nonessential animal so they would not affect land regulations or development as ranchers were concerned they could be charged with an offense if any birds were injured on their property after the release. Though the birth rate remains low in the wild, their numbers are increasing steadily through regular releases of captive-reared adolescents.

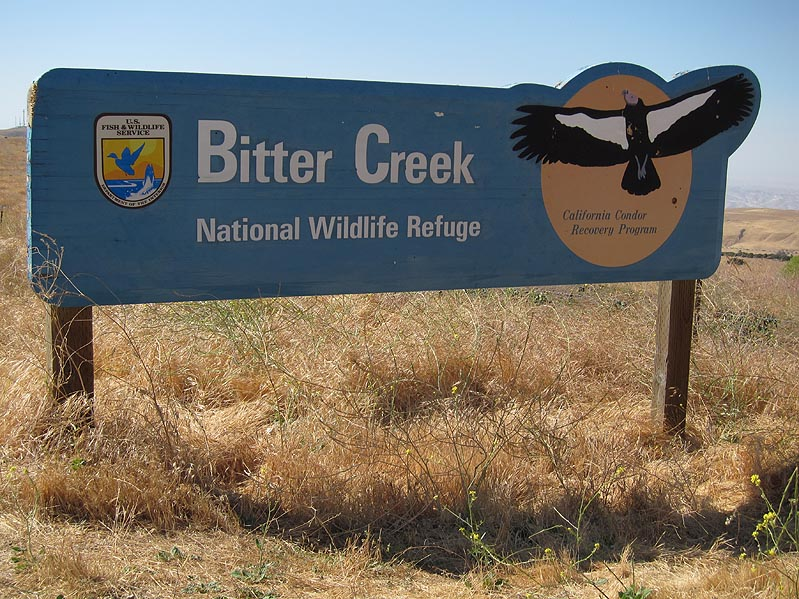
A USFWS sign at Bitter Creek National Wildlife Refuge showing the site's association with the California Condor Recovery Program

=== Obstacles to recovery ===
In modern times, numerous causes have contributed to the California condor's decline, both before and after recovery efforts began. For example, between 1992 and 2013, 237 condor deaths occurred in the wild population. The leading cause of mortality in condor nestlings is the ingestion of trash that is fed to them by their parents. Among juveniles and adults, lead poisoning (from eating animal carcasses containing lead shot) is the main cause of death.

Significant past damage to the condor population has also been attributed to poaching, DDT poisoning, electric power lines, egg collecting, and habitat destruction. During the California Gold Rush, some condors were even kept as pets.

==== Reproduction ====
Its low clutch size of one egg and late age of sexual maturity (≈ 6 years) make the bird vulnerable to artificial population decline.

Inbreeding may be causing increased incidence of fatal chondrodystrophic dwarfism in wild condors, as well as a syndrome presenting with 14 rather than the typical 12 tail feathers. A 2021 study found a surprising degree of genomic diversity in condors, however. Such data allow refinement to conservation strategies, helping mitigate the effects of inbreeding. One of the study's authors hopes to complete genomic analysis of all 22 individuals from which all living condors descend.

==== Lead poisoning ====
Lead poisoning is a significant threat to condors and other avian and terrestrial scavengers Fragmented lead ammunition in large game waste is highly problematic for condors due to their extremely strong digestive juices. Blood-lead analysis of wild condors showed lead isotope signature matches to ammunition purchased by researchers near the range of the affected condors. In California, the Ridley-Tree Condor Preservation Act went into effect July 1, 2008, requiring that hunters use non-lead ammunition when hunting in the condor's range. Blood lead levels in golden eagles as well as turkey vultures has declined with the implementation of the Ridley-Tree Condor Preservation Act, demonstrating that the legislation has helped reduce other species' lead exposures aside from the California condor. There is no comparable anti-lead-bullet legislation in the other states in which the condor resides.

In 2015, Bruce Rideout, director of the wildlife disease laboratories for San Diego Zoo Global, indicated that lead poisoning is the most common cause of death for juvenile and adult condors in the wild. Among wild deaths with known causes between 1992 and 2013, over 60% (excluding chicks and fledglings) have been as a result of lead poisoning. Due to condors' long lifespan (over 50 years) and relatively late age of sexual maturity (≈ 6 years), and small clutch size in the wild (one egg every year or two), the population is very poorly suited to withstand the neurotoxic effects of lead exposure."

According to epidemiologist Terra Kelly, until all natural food sources are free from lead-based ammunition, "lead poisoning will threaten recovery of naturally sustaining populations of condors in the wild". While researchers and veterinarians involved in the condor recovery program note that hunters who use lead-free ammunition actually provide critical sources of food for condors and other scavengers, they caution that using lead ammunition presents a serious and preventable threat to condors and other wildlife.

==== Other premature death ====
Premature condor death may also occur due to contact with golden eagles. Evidence from condor release efforts also suggests golden eagles may occasionally kill condors.

Collision with power lines can also result in condor death. Since 1994, captive-bred California condors have been trained to avoid power lines and people. Since the implementation of this aversion conditioning program, the number of condor deaths due to power lines has greatly decreased.

==== Trash ingestion ====
"Being vultures, condors not only eat dead animals but they also have been observed eating small pieces of bone [which is especially crucial during the egg-laying period]. Although extremely intelligent, condors can't always tell the difference between small pieces of trash and pieces of bone," according to Tim Hauck, Project Director for the California Condor Reintroduction Program. Indigestible trash can cause impaction, starvation, and death if affected condors do not receive timely medical intervention. Parent birds may unintentionally feed microtrash to nestlings, which some research has shown to be the leading cause of death among wild condor nestlings.

==== Disease ====
In 2023, Highly Pathogenic Avian Influenza (HPAI) infected members of the Utah-Arizona flock, killing 21 condors (including 13 individuals from 8 breeding pairs). Other individuals were released back into the wild following medical treatment. Sixteen condors were treated as part of a vaccine trial. As of 2 February 2024, 94 condors had received at least the first of two doses of the vaccine.

During routine winter trapping intended to assess lead levels, blood samples collected from 21 condors were tested for HPAI antibodies. About half the samples showed the presence of antibodies to the H5N1 strain of HPAI, indicating these birds were exposed to the virus and survived naturally.

=== Population growth ===
Nesting milestones have been reached by the reintroduced condors. In 2003, the first nestling fledged in the wild since 1981. In March 2006, a pair of California condors, released by Ventana Wildlife Society, attempted to nest in a hollow tree near Big Sur, California. This was the first time in more than 100 years that a pair of California condors had been seen nesting in Northern California.

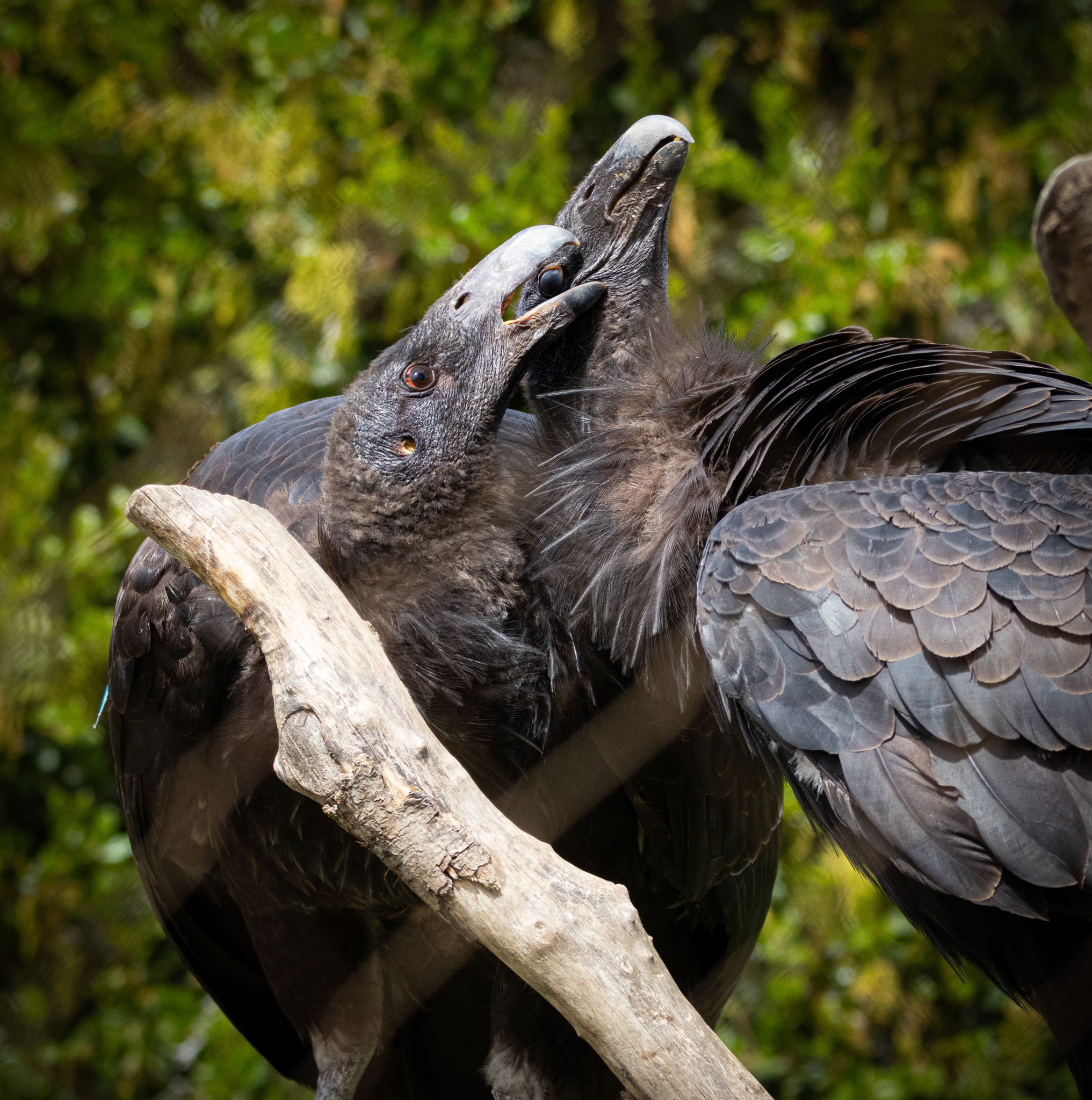
Preening between juveniles, at the Santa Barbara Zoo

In October 2010, the wild condor population reached 100 individuals in its namesake state of California, plus 73 wild condors in Arizona. In November 2011, there were 394 living individuals, 205 of them in the wild and the rest in the San Diego Zoo Safari Park, the Santa Barbara Zoo, the Los Angeles Zoo, the Oregon Zoo, and the World Center for Birds of Prey in Boise, Idaho. In May 2012, the number of living individuals had reached 405, with 179 living in captivity. By June 2014, the condor population had reached 439: 225 in the wild and 214 in captivity. Official statistics from the December 2016 USFWS recorded an overall population of 446, of which 276 are wild and 170 are captive. A key milestone was reached in 2015 when more condors were born in the wild than died.

=== Reintroduction to Mexico ===
As the Recovery Program achieved milestones, a fifth active release site in Sierra de San Pedro Mártir National Park, Baja California, Mexico, was added to the three release sites in California and the release site in Arizona. In early 2007, a California condor laid an egg in Mexico for the first time since at least the 1930s.

In June 2016, three chicks that were born in Chapultepec Zoo in Mexico City, were flown to Sierra de San Pedro Mártir National Park, Baja California, Mexico. In the spring of 2009, a second wild chick was born in the Sierra de San Pedro Mártir National Park and was named Inyaa ("Sun" in the Kiliwa language) by local environmentalists.

=== Expanded range ===
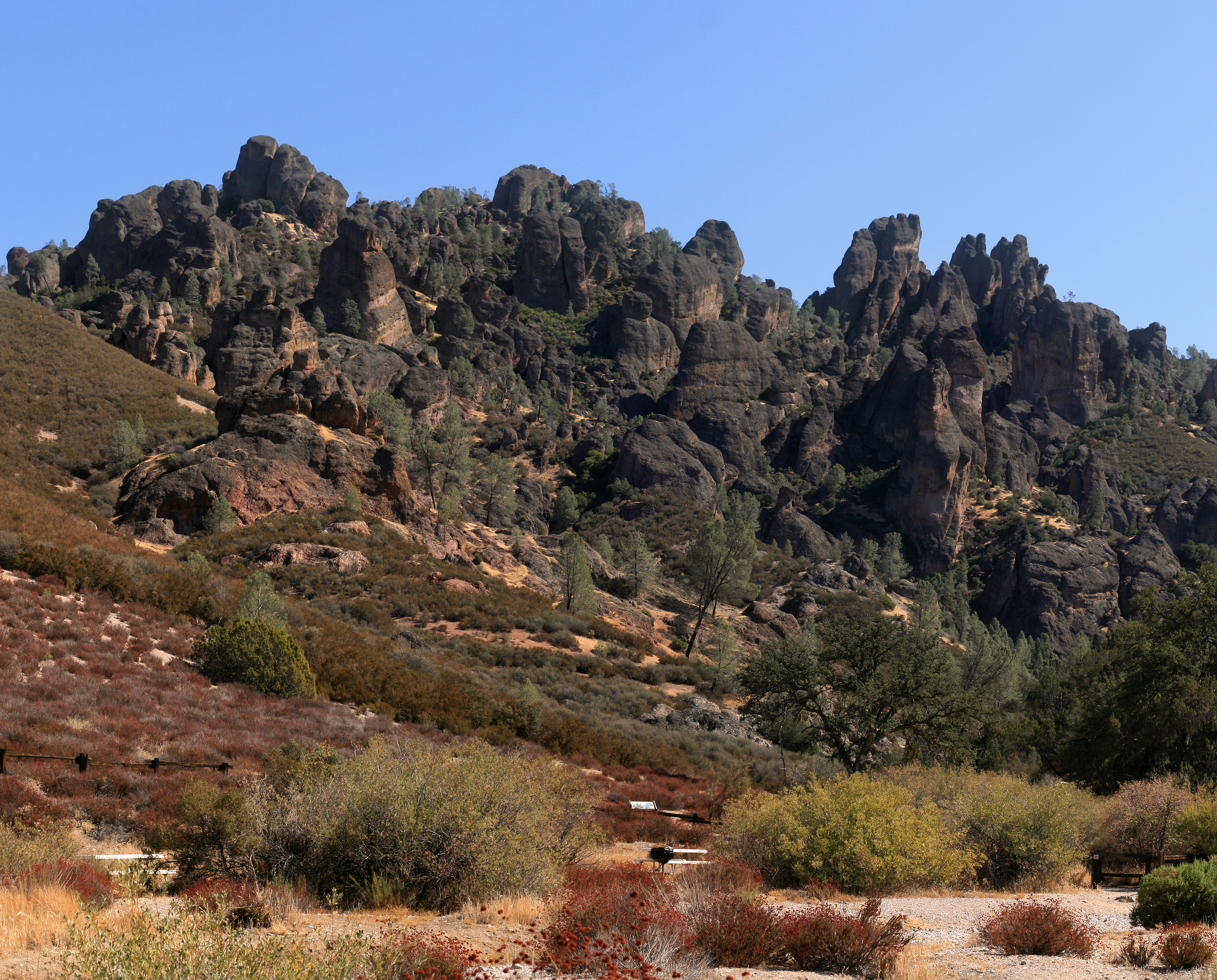
Pinnacles National Park, a release site

In 2014, Condor #597, also known as "Lupine", was spotted near Pescadero, a coastal community south of San Francisco. Lupine had been routinely seen at Pinnacles National Park after having been released into the wild at Big Sur the previous year. Younger birds of the central California population are seeking to expand their territory, which could mean that a new range expansion is possible for the more than 60 condors flying free in central California. Also in 2014 the first successful breeding in Utah was reported. A pair of condors that had been released in Arizona, nested in Zion National Park and the hatching of one chick was confirmed. The 1,000th chick since recovery efforts began hatched in Zion in May 2019. The California condor was seen for the first time in nearly 50 years in Sequoia National Park in late May 2020.

As part of an effort headed by the Yurok tribe to reintroduce the condor (Yurok name 'prey-go-neesh') to the coastal redwoods of northern California, birds hatched at the Oregon Zoo and the World Center for Birds of Prey were released at Redwood National Park in 2022. The first condor brought to the Yurok site was called Paaytoqin from the Nez Perce language meaning 'Come back'; he is also known as 'Mentor' or #736. He was brought to the site, but not released, to help instruct the younger condors how to behave "because of his calm nature and good disposition". Mentor condors are used to serve as a role model and establish a social hierarchy within a flock as an essential part of its survival. By October 2026, 33 birds were flying free.

The first condor to be released was called Poy'-we-son (Yurok for "the one who goes ahead"), followed by Nes-kwe-chokw ("He returns"), Ney-gem' 'Ne-chweenkah' ("She carries our prayers") and 'Hlow Hoo-let' ("At last I (or we) fly!"). The youngsters felt at home with one another having lived together at other facilities. As of March 2024, 11 birds (4 females and 7 males) have been successfully introduced, with another 5 or more being released that year. An article in the North Coast Journal from November 2023 describes the 11 birds with their names and translations. By the end of November 2024, 18 condors have been released at the site. One of the birds, named B9, was seen flying in southern Oregon on May 12, 2026, marking the first time in over 120 years of a wild condor being seen in the state.

In early March 2026, Ney-gem' 'Ne-chweenkah' and 'Hlow Hoo-let' were found to be incubating an egg in an old growth redwood nest in Yurok territory, marking the first time in over a century that condors have bred on Yurok lands. The nest failed to produce a chick; however, this is common for first-time incubators, and the pair will have a higher chance of succeeding in future years. The Yurok tribe expects more mated pairs to begin forming over the next few years, which should result in a growing population of wild-hatched condors.

=== Condor Watch ===
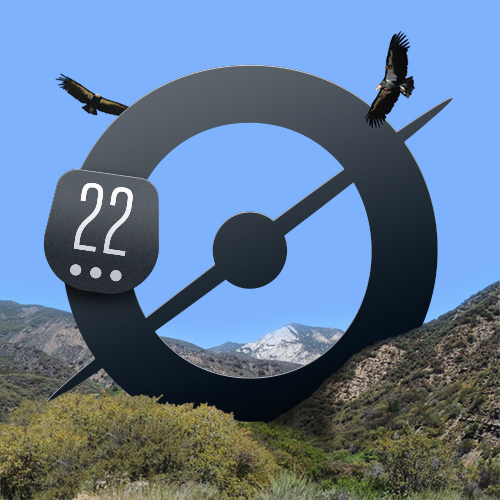
Zooniverse icon for Condor Watch

A crowdsourcing project called Condor Watch was started on April 14, 2014, and ended in 2020. Hosted by the web portal Zooniverse, volunteers were asked to examine motion-capture images of California condors associated with release sites managed by the United States Fish and Wildlife Service, National Park Service and Ventana Wildlife Society. The tasks on the website included identifying tagged condors and marking the distance to feeding sources such as animal carcasses. Biologists can then use this data to deduce which birds are at risk of lead poisoning.

Condor Watch enabled volunteers, or citizen scientists, to participate in active research. The project had up 175,000 images to view and assess, far more than the team could hope to view on their own. Lead scientist Myra Finkelstein believes volunteering is fun because it allows enthusiasts to track the "biographies" of individual condors. Citizen science has long been used in ornithology, for instance in the Audubon Society's Christmas Bird Count, which began in 1900 and the breeding bird survey which began in 1966. McCaffrey (2005) believes this approach not only directly benefits ongoing projects, but will also help train aspiring ornithologists.

== Relationship with humans ==
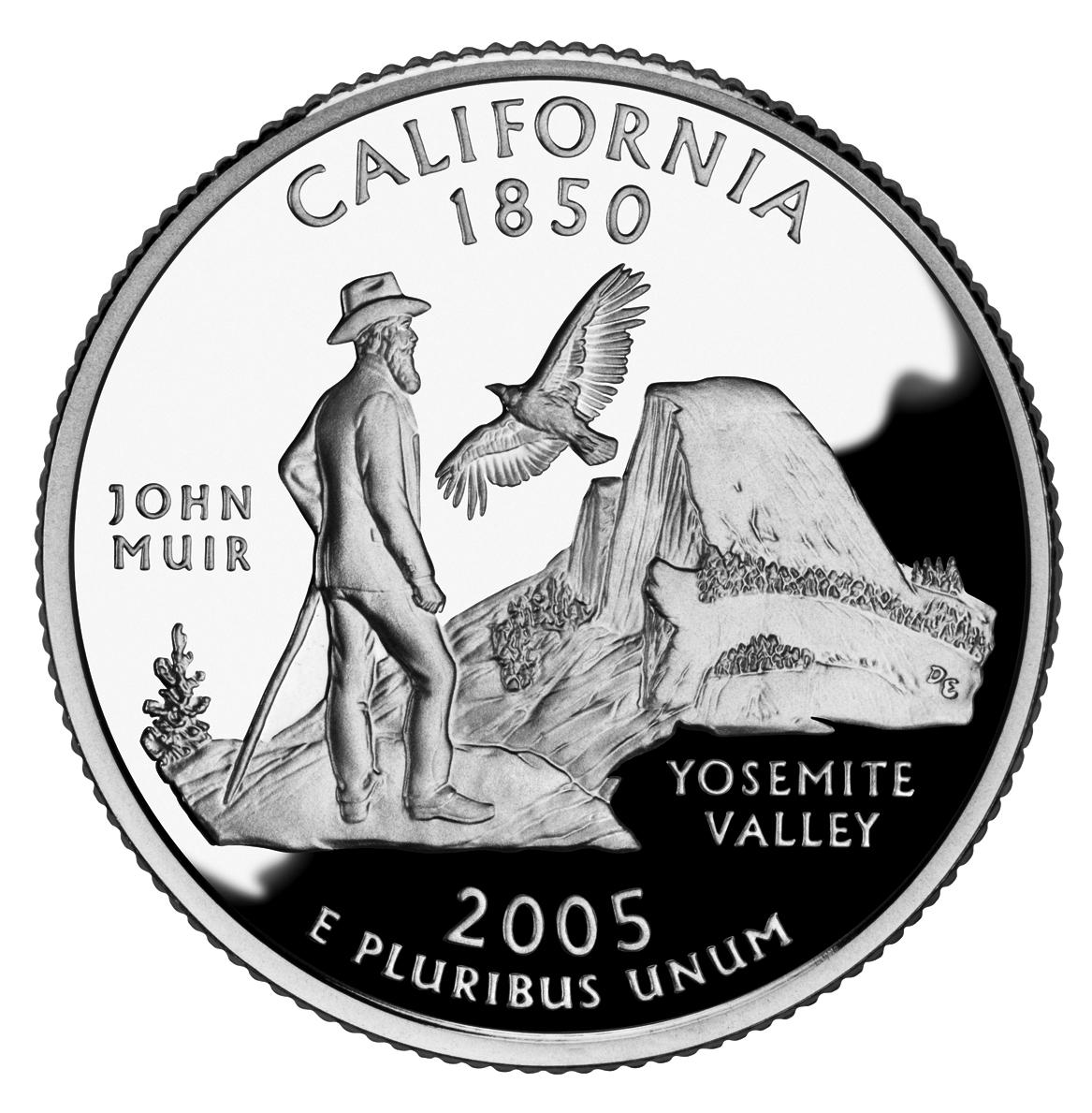
Condor on California's state quarter

Throughout its historic range, the California condor has been a popular subject of mythology and an important symbol to Native Americans. Unusually, this bird takes on different roles in the storytelling of the different tribes.

The Wiyot tribe of California have a legend that the condor recreated humankind after Above Old Man wiped humanity out with a flood. However, other tribes, such as California's Mono, view the condor as a destroyer, not a creator; they say that Condor seized humans, cut off their heads, and drained their blood so that it would flood Ground Squirrel's home. Condor then seized Ground Squirrel after he fled, but Ground Squirrel managed to cut off Condor's head when Condor paused to take a drink of the blood. According to the Yokuts people, the condor sometimes ate the moon, causing the lunar cycle, and his wings caused eclipses. The Chumash tribe of Southern California tell that the condor was once a white bird, but it turned black when it flew too close to a fire.

Condor bones have been found in Native American graves, as have condor feather headdresses. Cave paintings of condors have also been discovered. Some tribes ritually killed condors to make ceremonial clothing out of their feathers. Whenever a Shaman died, his clothes were said to be cursed, so new clothing had to be made for his successor.

Some researchers believe that this practice of animal sacrifice contributed to the condor's decline. A few tribes were known to have killed condors, such as the Miwok, the Patwin, the Luiseño and the Pomo, but how many they killed is difficult to assess accurately.

== See also ==
- Colpocephalum californici, a species of louse that exclusively parasitized the California condor until pesticide treatment of the entire remaining condor population under the California Condor Recovery Program resulted in conservation-induced extinction of the species
