= Hopper Mountain National Wildlife Refuge =

California condor preserve in Ventura County, California

- IUCN category IV (habitat/species management area)
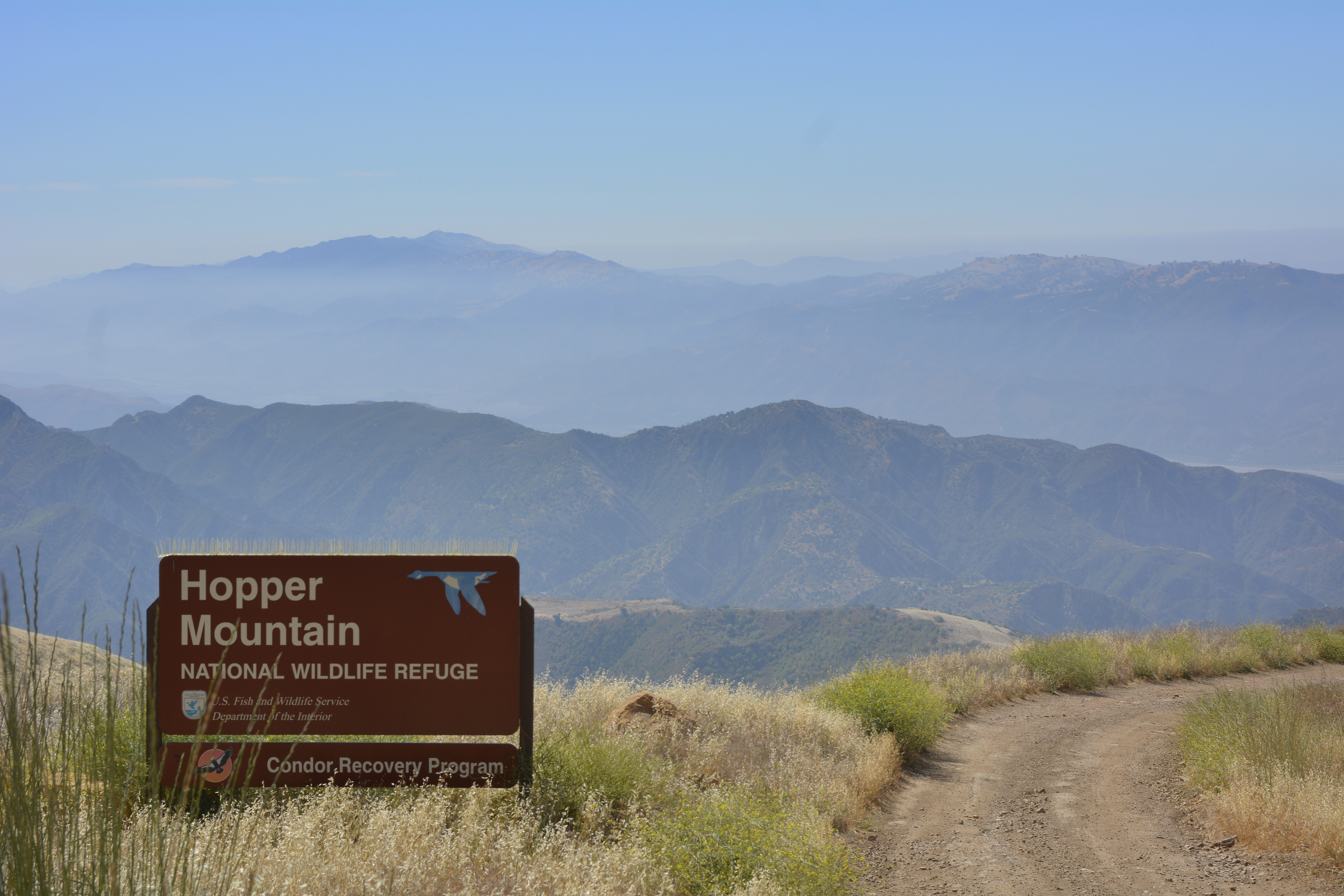

- Location within the United States
- Location: Ventura County, California
- Nearest city: Fillmore
- Coordinates: 34.4569°N 118.8542°W
- Area: 2,471-acre (10.00 km^{2})
- Established: 1974
- Governing body: United States Fish and Wildlife Service
- Website: Hopper Mountain National Wildlife Refuge

Hopper Mountain National Wildlife Refuge is located in the Topatopa Mountains of Ventura County, in southern California. It is bordered by the Los Padres National Forest and the Sespe Condor Sanctuary to the north. The 2,471-acre (10.00 km^{2}) refuge was established in 1974 to protect the endangered California condor, its habitat, and other wildlife resources.

The refuge is in rugged, mountainous terrain. Primary habitats include annual grasslands, interspersed with oak and California black walnut groves, with chaparral on the steeper slopes, natural water springs and riparian habitat, and a freshwater marsh. The California black walnut community is considered to be a unique habitat in California, and is recorded in the State Natural Heritage Database.

The refuge provides habitat for more than 130 species of birds, mammals, and reptiles, including the southwestern pond turtle—a California species of special concern--black bear, bobcat, mule deer, golden eagle, and California tree frog. More than 200 plant species have also been documented on the refuge.

Hopper Mountain National Wildlife Refuge plays an integral part in the California Condor Recovery Program, providing foraging and roosting habitat for the bird. The refuge shares information about the Condor Recovery Program through an outreach program that extends to local, national and international publics.

The refuge is closed to public use to protect habitat for the endangered California condor and to support ongoing efforts to reintroduce California condors to the wild. The road to the refuge runs through private lands, and the road itself is inaccessible to the general public. The U.S. Forest Service maintains two observation points in Los Padres National Forest.

As of July 2014, there is a total population of 437 condors living in sites in California, Baja California and Arizona. This includes a wild population of 232 and a captive population of 205. 68 free-flying condors are managed by the US Fish & Wildlife Service in Southern California.
