= Jan Hamber =

American ornithologist and conservationist

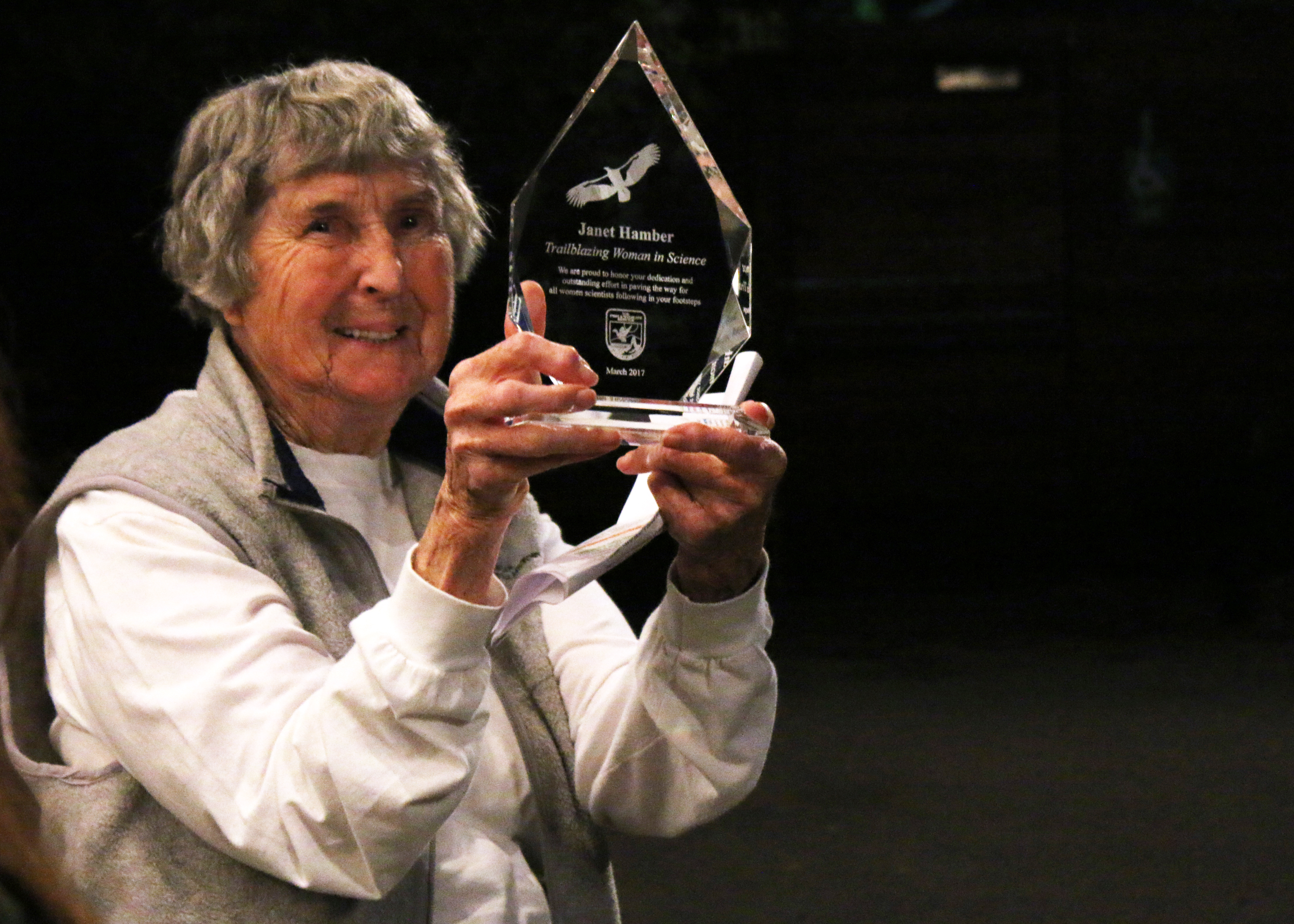
- Jan Hamber with the U.S. Fish and Wildlife Service Trailblazing Women in Science Award
- Education: Cornell University
- Known for: Conservation of the California condor
- Awards: Santa Barbara Local Hero; Trailblazing Women in Science Award, USFWS; Wilderness Spirit Award
- Scientific career
- Fields: Ornithology; Biology
- Workplaces: Santa Barbara Museum of Natural History

Jan Hamber (née Armstrong) is an American ornithologist and conservationist. While working at the Santa Barbara Museum of Natural History in the 1970s, she became involved in the effort to save the California condor, and has been credited with playing a major role in the condor's survival in the wild. Hamber was the biologist who tracked the last known California condor in the wild, placing the phone call that led to its capture at the beginning of the successful captive breeding program that saved condors from becoming extinct.

== Early life and education ==
Jan Armstrong was born in New Jersey and grew up in New York City, where her father taught agriculture at a high school. She developed an early interest in birding. Hamber attended Cornell University, where she took a class in ornithology taught by Professor Arthur Allen, and went on to major in botany. While at Cornell she met and married Hank Hamber, and the two lived in Connecticut, Florida, and Alaska before moving to California in 1957 and settling in Santa Barbara in 1959.

== Conservation work ==
While living in California, Hamber was one of the founders of the Santa Barbara chapter of the Audubon Society. She began volunteering at the Santa Barbara Museum of Natural History in 1959, where by the end of the 1960s she had worked as associate curator of vertebrate zoology and curator of ornithology mammalogy. As a curator at the museum, Hamber was prevented from doing field research with the rest of the science team on one of California's Channel Islands, because the owner of the site would not allow a woman to work as a researcher there. In 1976, Hamber accompanied the naturalist Dick Smith on a U.S. Forest Service expedition to study a pair of California condors that he had found nesting in the San Rafael Wilderness, and she continued to study condors in following seasons. After Smith died in 1977, Hamber and her husband continued tracking the condors. By 1980, the California condor had become critically endangered, and in the wake of the Endangered Species Act of 1973 the condor had become the focus of one of the American government's highest-priority conservation efforts. Hamber was assigned to monitor the nesting pair of condors that Smith had discovered several years previously. John Moir, writing for Audubon, credited Hamber with the discovery that it is possible for Condors to nest in successive years, calling this "a finding with significant implications for rebuilding the population".

In 1987, Hamber was tasked with tracking the last wild California condor (one of only 27 condors then alive, with the other 26 in captivity in California zoos). Captive breeding could not yet be attempted because the only male condor bred in captivity was at Los Angeles Zoo, but there were no female condors that it could mate with. As the person tracking the only living wild condor, Hamber initiated its capture, so that zoos could attempt to restore the species through a captive breeding program. With no condors left in the wild to monitor, Hamber established the Condor Archives at the Santa Barbara Museum of Natural History, translating decades of field notes about California condors into a searchable database. That database turned into the most comprehensive database about condors. As the condor captive breeding program began to work and more condors were born and released into the wild, Hamber again became involved in efforts to monitor them, something she continued volunteering to do as the wild population of condors grew over the following decades. The capture and release efforts proved to be effective, and by 2019 there were about 500 California condors in the world (split roughly equally between wild and captive birds).

Hamber was one of the biologists featured in the 2013 documentary The Condor's Shadow. A timeline of her work was exhibited by the Santa Barbara Museum of Natural History in 2020. In 2012, Hamber was named a Local Hero by the Santa Barbara Independent. In 2017, Hamber was awarded the Trailblazing Women in Science Award from the United States Fish and Wildlife Service, in recognition of her work on California condor conservation. Hamber also won the 2017 Wilderness Spirit Award from the Wildling Museum of Art & Nature and the Wilderness Legacy Award from Los Padres ForestWatch in 2014.

== Selected awards ==
- Santa Barbara Local Hero (2012)
- Wilderness Legacy Award (2014)
- Trailblazing Women in Science Award, U.S. Fish and Wildlife Service (2017)
- Wilderness Spirit Award (2017)
