= California coastal sage and chaparral =

Mediterranean forests, woodlands, and scrub ecoregion in Mexico and the United States

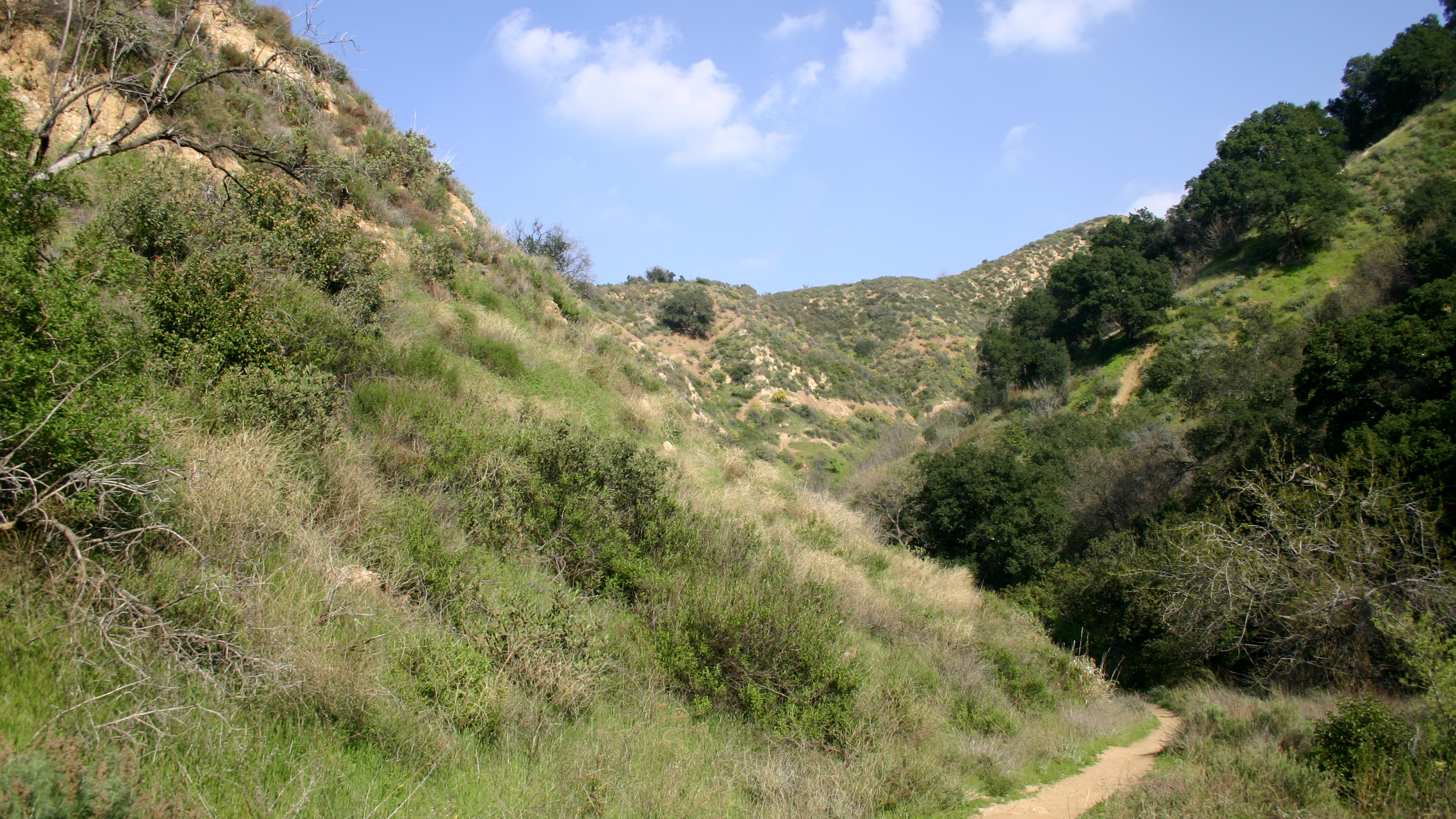
- Coastal sage and chaparral of Santa Clarita Woodlands Park

Ecology
- Realm: Nearctic
- Biome: Mediterranean forests, woodlands, and scrub
- Borders: Baja California desert; California montane chaparral and woodlands; Sierra Juárez and San Pedro Mártir pine–oak forests; Sonoran Desert
- Bird species: 291
- Mammal species: 74

Geography
- Area: 32,970 km^{2} (12,730 mi^{2})
- Countries: Mexico; United States
- States: Baja California; California
- Rivers: Los Angeles River, San Diego River, Malibu Creek, San Gabriel River, Santa Ana River, Santa Clara River, Tijuana River, Ventura River
- Climate type: Mediterranean (Csa)

Conservation
- Conservation status: Critical/Endangered
- Global 200: Yes
- Habitat loss: 18.5%
- Protected: 17.8%

The California coastal sage and chaparral is a Mediterranean forests, woodlands, and scrub ecoregion, defined by the World Wildlife Fund, located in southwestern California (United States) and northwestern Baja California (Mexico). It is part of the larger California chaparral and woodlands ecoregion. The ecoregion corresponds to the USDA Southern California ecoregion section 261B, and to the EPA Southern California/Northern Baja Coast ecoregion 85.

== Geography ==
The California coastal sage and chaparral ecoregion covers about 12,730 square miles (32,970 km^{2}) of coastal terraces, plains, and foothills between Santa Barbara, California and northeastern Baja California. This includes the southwestern slopes of the Transverse and Peninsular Ranges, the entirety of the Santa Susana and Santa Monica Mountains, the Channel Islands, Guadalupe Island, and Cedros Island.

Major urban centers located within this ecoregion include Greater Los Angeles, San Diego-Tijuana, Ensenada, and Tecate.

== Climate ==
The climate is Mediterranean, with mild, wet winters and hot, dry summers. Almost all of the daily maximum temperatures lie between 16 and 27 °C (61 and 81 °F). Mean annual precipitation is generally below 12 inches (300 mm), although can be as high as 26 inches (660 mm) in the Santa Monica Mountains and hills around the Los Angeles Basin.

== Flora ==
The plant species of the California coastal sage and chaparral ecoregion are diverse, with high endemism. The main plant communities are coastal sage scrub, California coastal prairie, chamise chaparral, southern oak woodland, pine forests, riparian woodland, and salt marshes.

=== Coast ===
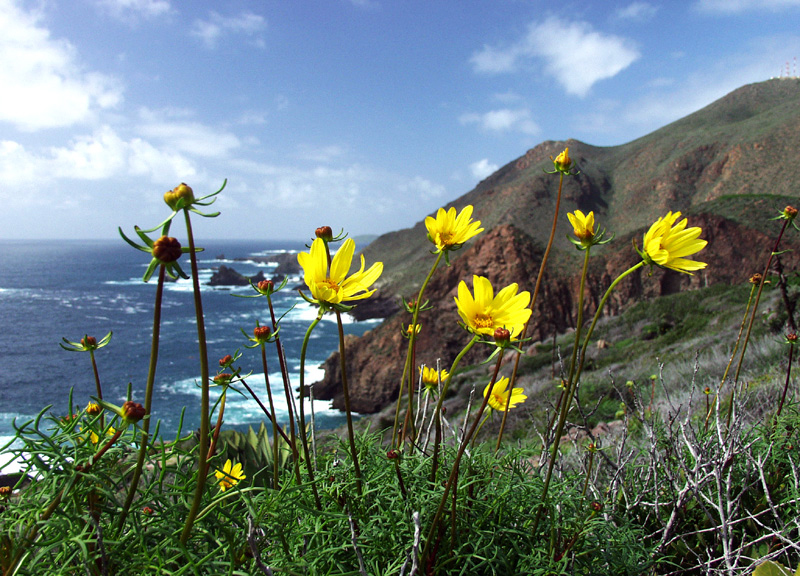
Sea dahlia growing on steep coastal slopes near Ensenada, Baja California

Prominent coast adjacent species include: California sagebrush (Artemisia californica) and brittlebush (Encelia californica), along with black sage (Salvia mellifera), purple sage (Salvia leucophylla or Salvia clevelandii), bush monkeyflower (Mimulus longiflorus or Mimulus aurantiacus), and California buckwheat (Eriogonum fasciculatum).

Cacti and succulents can be found in the southern areas of this coastal ecoregion in Baja California. Examples of succulents in this ecoregion include: Shaw's agave (Agave shawii), coastal dudleya (Dudleya caespitosa), golden cereus (Bergerocactus emoryi), and other prickly pear (Opuntia), Yucca and Dudleya species.

Some of the endemic plants to the ecoregion's southern coast zone include: San Diego thornmint (Acanthomintha ilicifolia), San Diego ambrosia (Ambrosia pumila) and San Diego barrel cactus (Ferocactus viridescens).

=== Slopes ===
Higher up from the shoreline, above an elevation of 1,000 feet (300 m), the slopes are densely covered in chaparral shrubs, such as: chamise (Adenostoma fasciculatum), and California lilac (Ceanothus spp.) and manzanita (Arctostaphylos glandulosa, Arctostaphylos glauca, and Arctostaphylos patula) . Chaparral yucca (Hesperoyucca whipplei) is commonplace throughout the climate zone. Other species include mountain mahogany (Cercocarpus betuloides), silk-tassel bush (Garrya fremontii), and ribbonwood (Adenostoma sparsifolium)

=== Trees ===
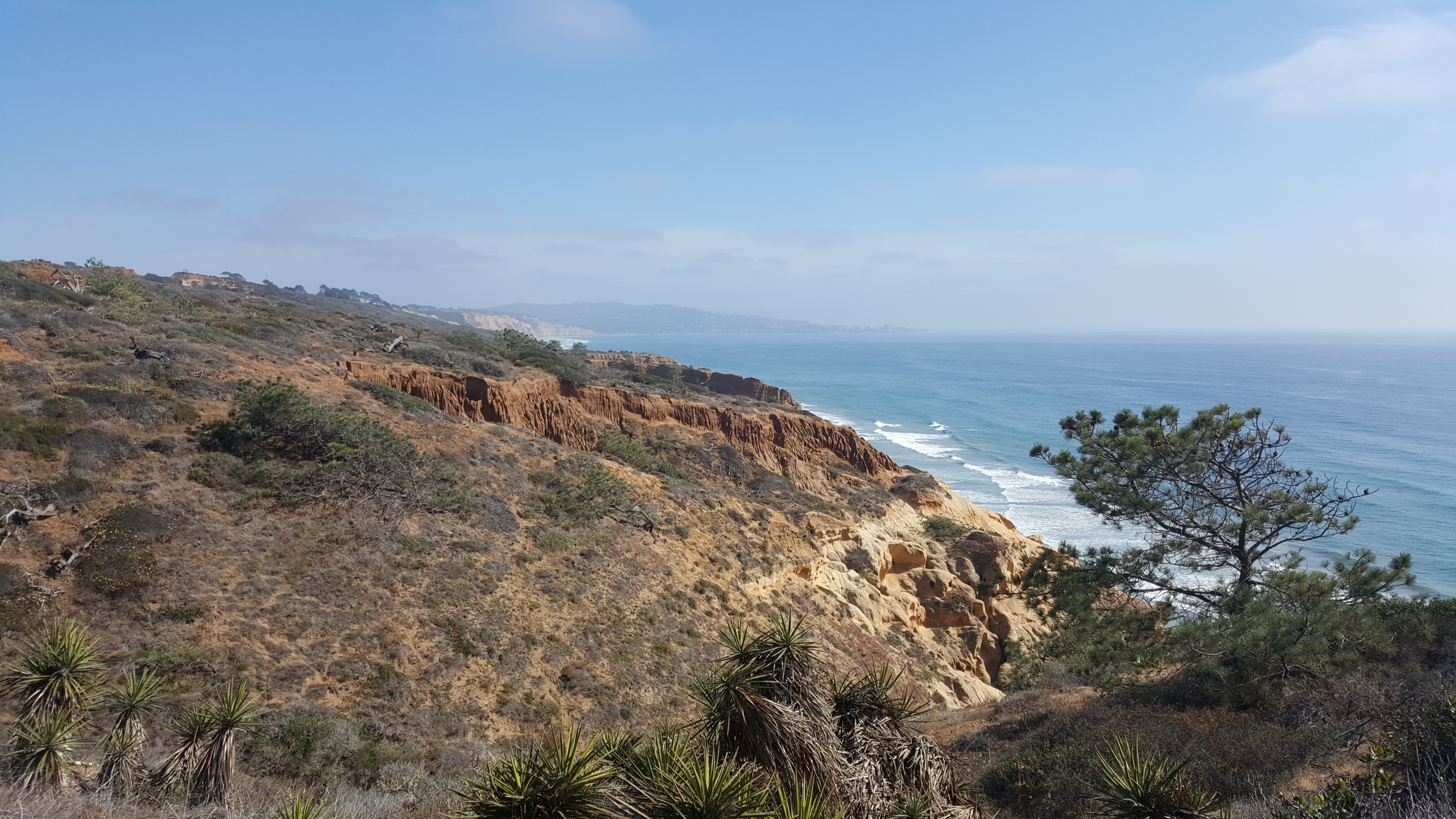
Coastal scrub and Torrey pine in Torrey Pines State Natural Reserve, San Diego

California oak woodland occurs in moist areas usually up to 4,900 feet (1,500 m). These woodlands include oak species, such as coast live oak (Quercus agrifolia), canyon live oak (Quercus chrysolepis), and Engelmann's oak (Quercus engelmannii). Associated species include the California black walnut (Juglans californica) on some north faces of the Santa Monica Mountains, Santa Susana Mountains, and the San Jose Hills; and poison oak (Toxicodendron diversilobum).

Riparian woodlands up to 5,000 feet (1,500 m) are dominated by western sycamore (Platanus racemosa) and various willow species such as Salix gooddingii, Salix laevigata, and Salix lasiolepis. Riparian understory contains California laurel (Umbellularia californica) and Pacific madrone (Arbutus menziesii).

Mountain conifers dominate above 6,000 feet (1,800 m). These include species such as the sugar pine (Pinus lambertiana), ponderosa pine (Pinus ponderosa), Jeffrey pine (Pinus jeffreyi), Coulter pine (Pinus coulteri), bigcone Douglas-fir (Pseudotsuga macrocarpa), and incense cedar (Calocedrus decurrens).

Some endemic tree species mark niche ecological islands. One example is the rare Torrey pine (Pinus torreyana), which is only native to the coastal bluffs in Torrey Pines State Natural Reserve near San Diego, and off the coast on Santa Rosa Island. Another example is the Tecate cypress (Cupressus forbesii), which only occurs in four stands near the Mexican border of California. The Tecate cypress only occurs in alkaline soils eroded from gabbro.

=== Channel Islands ===
The Channel Islands are mostly covered in grassland and coastal sage scrub, with areas of island chaparral, oak woodland, pine woodland, and mixed woodland. Endemic and/or rare plants include buckwheats (Eriogonum spp.), oaks (such as island oak—Quercus tomentella), Catalina ironwood (Lyonothamnus floribundus), and Dudleya species restricted to these islands. Bishop pine also occurs on these islands.

=== Other habitats ===
In and around these different habitats, this diverse ecoregion also contains 'patches' of grasslands with native or introduced grass species and serpentine barrens.

Seasonal wetlands, such as vernal pools, form ecological islands. There are more than 30 wildflower species that are endemic to the pools in this ecoregion, including Orcuttia californica grass. One subspecies of meadow-foam, Limnanthes alba ssp. parishii is only found in the ephemeral wetlands of the Laguna Mountains (and also 800 mi or 1,300 km away in the Klamath Mountains).

Wildfires are part of the natural fire ecology throughout the ecoregion. Habitats of this hot, dry coast must survive and revive following the regular forest fires, and the dominant plant species have adapted to recover from fires.

== Fauna ==
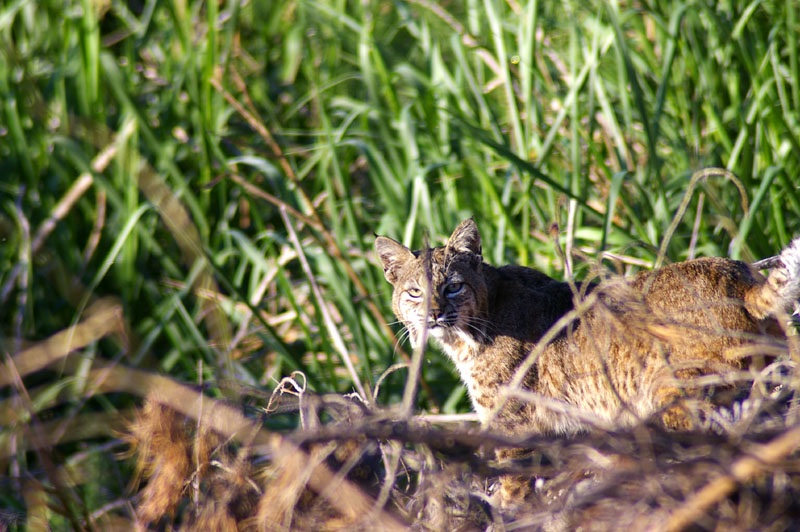
A bobcat roaming the foothills of the Santa Monica Mountains

The coastal sage and chaparral of California are home to a variety of small mammals, such as deer mice, desert woodrats, and desert shrews. Predators include mountain lions, coyotes, grey foxes, and bobcats.

Lizards of note include side-blotched lizards, western fence lizards, sagebrush lizards, and the San Diego subspecies of the coast horned lizard. Resident snake species include large carnivores such as common kingsnakes, gopher snakes, rosy boas, and western rattlesnakes.

Invertebrates of note include the cheese-weed moth lacewing (Chrysoperla species). The Hermes copper and Quino checkerspot butterflies among the 200 butterfly species found here. Vernal pools in the ecoregion are home to Riverside fairy shrimp (Streptocephalus woottoni).

=== Birds ===
Typical birds of the region include scrub jays, wrentits, and rufous-sided towhees. Predatory birds include great horned owls and red-tailed hawks.

The California gnatcatcher is a small bird, endemic to this coastal ecoregion, which has been protected as its habitat is now designated an Important Bird Area. Other birds found here are the endemic Nuttall's woodpecker (Dryobates nuttallii) of the oak woodland, and the coastal populations of the protected cactus wren (Campylorhynchus brunneicapillus). The island scrub jay (Aphelocoma insularis) is endemic to Santa Cruz Island.

Important Bird Areas in Mexico include Isla Guadalupe and Isla Cedros, and parts of Sierra de Juárez and Sierra de San Pedro Mártir.

== Threats and preservation ==
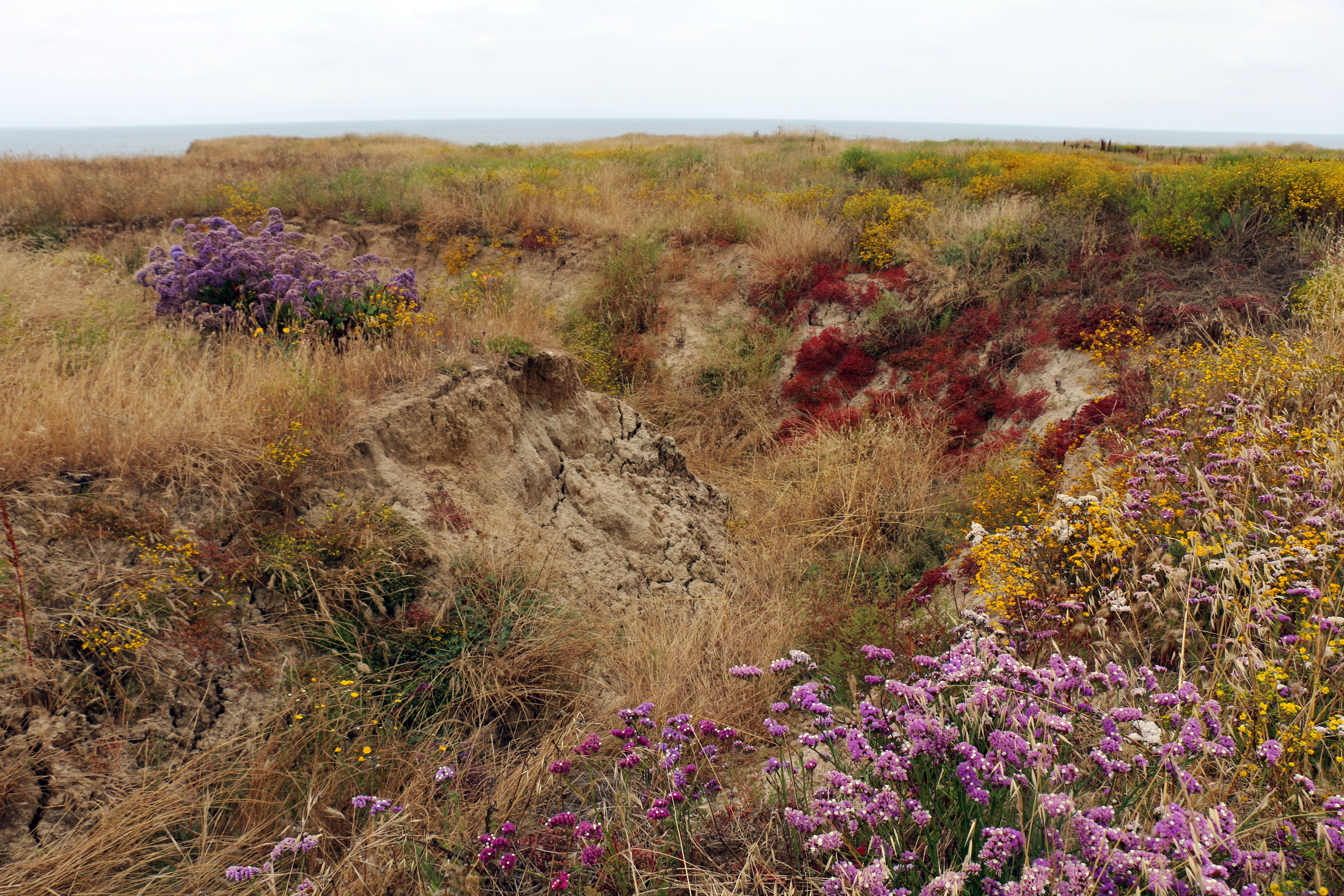
Restored patch of coastal scrub at Marine Corps Base Camp Pendleton

This attractive coastline is highly vulnerable to urban, recreational, and agricultural development and only 15% of original habitat is intact. Habitats are vulnerable to livestock grazing, which has removed much native vegetation on the Channel Islands, such as Santa Cruz where sheep were grazed for over 100 years.

Another threat, ironically, is fire control, which only allows the amount of dry material in the forest to build up, resulting eventually in massive fires. However, in many chaparral regions such as the Santa Monica Mountains, increased fire frequency is the larger concern because fire return intervals in mature chaparral communities should be 30–150 years, unlike much of the region which often has return intervals of 20 years or less.

There are patches of coastal sage scrub in Marine Corps Base Camp Pendleton, the Santa Monica Mountains, the San Joaquin Hills near Laguna Beach, and the Irvine Ranch in Orange County, California. Additional patches of coastal sage scrub exist in Southern California in the Angeles National Forest.

=== Protected areas ===
A 2017 assessment found that 1,925 km^{2}, or 6%, of the ecoregion is in protected areas. Protected areas include Channel Islands National Park, Santa Monica Mountains National Recreation Area, Point Mugu State Park, Malibu Creek State Park, Topanga State Park, Griffith Park, Santa Susana Pass State Historic Park, Ballona Wetlands State Ecological Reserve, Chino Hills State Park, Crystal Cove State Park, the Santa Rosa Plateau Reserve, and Torrey Pines State Natural Reserve.

In Baja California, the chaparral ecology of Guadalupe Island, Isla Todos Santos, and the Coronado Islands are protected within the Baja California Pacific Islands Marine Conservation Area.

== See also ==
- List of ecoregions in Mexico
- List of ecoregions in the United States (WWF)
- Southern California Bight
