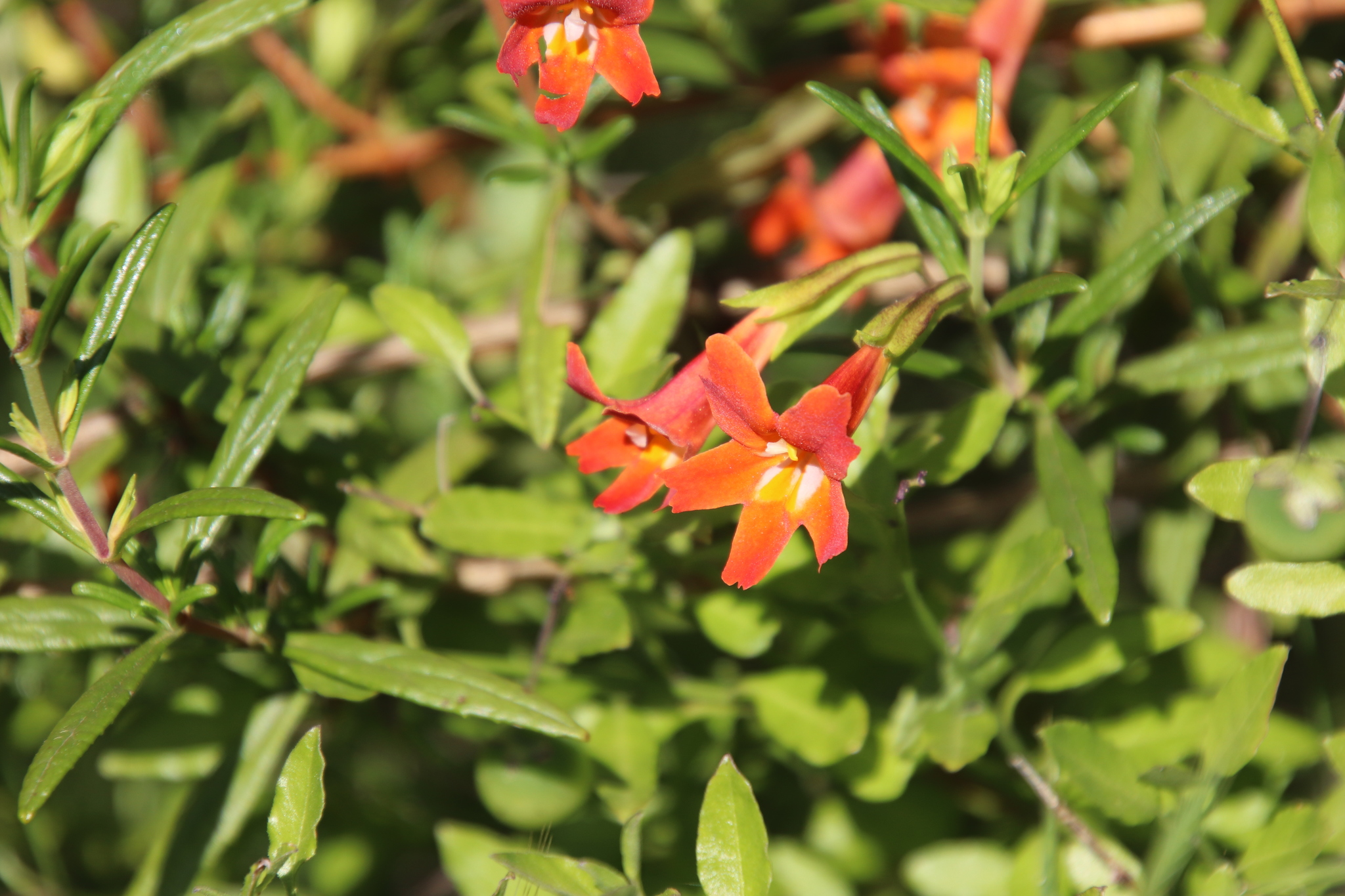

Scientific classification
- Kingdom: Plantae
- Clade: Tracheophytes
- Clade: Angiosperms
- Clade: Eudicots
- Clade: Asterids
- Order: Lamiales
- Family: Phrymaceae
- Genus: Diplacus
- Species: D. × australis

Binomial name
- Diplacus × australis (Munz) Tulig

Synonyms
- Diplacus aurantiacus subsp. australis (Munz) Beeks ex Thorne; Mimulus aurantiacus subsp. australis Munz

= Diplacus × australis =

Hybrid species of flowering plant

Diplacus × australis is a hybrid species of flowering plant. It is a subshrub native to southwestern California and northwestern Baja California. It is a hybrid of Diplacus longiflorus and Diplacus puniceus. It grows in chaparral and montane chaparral, on granite outcrops, and in disturbed areas in the Southern California coastal plain, the Transverse Ranges (western Transverse Ranges, San Gabriel Mountains, and San Bernardino Mountains), and the northern Peninsular Ranges.
