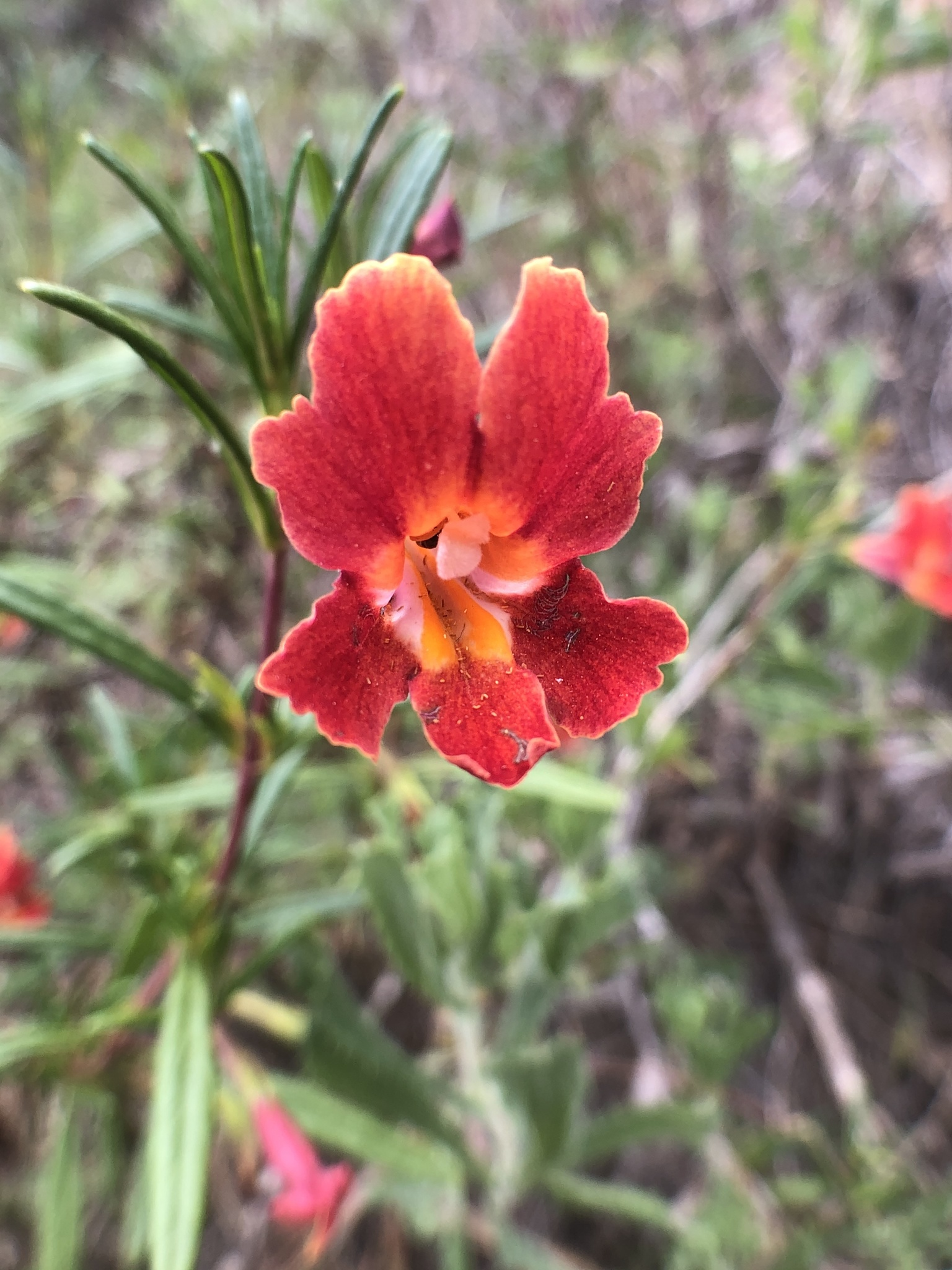

Conservation status
- Vulnerable (NatureServe)

Scientific classification
- Kingdom: Plantae
- Clade: Embryophytes
- Clade: Tracheophytes
- Clade: Angiosperms
- Clade: Eudicots
- Clade: Asterids
- Order: Lamiales
- Family: Phrymaceae
- Genus: Diplacus
- Species: D. puniceus

Binomial name
- Diplacus puniceus Nutt.

Synonyms
- Diplacus aurantiacus var. puniceus (Nutt.) D.J.Keil; Diplacus glutinosus var. puniceus (Nutt.) Benth.; Mimulus aurantiacus var. puniceus (Nutt.) D.M.Thomps.; Mimulus glutinosus var. puniceus (Nutt.) A.Gray; Mimulus puniceus (Nutt.) Steud.

= Diplacus puniceus =

Species of flowering plant

Diplacus puniceus, commonly known as the red bush monkeyflower, San Diego monkey flower, or mission diplacus, is a species of perennial shrub native to coastal southern California and northwestern Baja California. It is characterized by a relatively small and broad corolla for Diplacus, a lack of glandular hairs, and dark orange or red flowers, adapted to hummingbird pollinators.

== Description ==
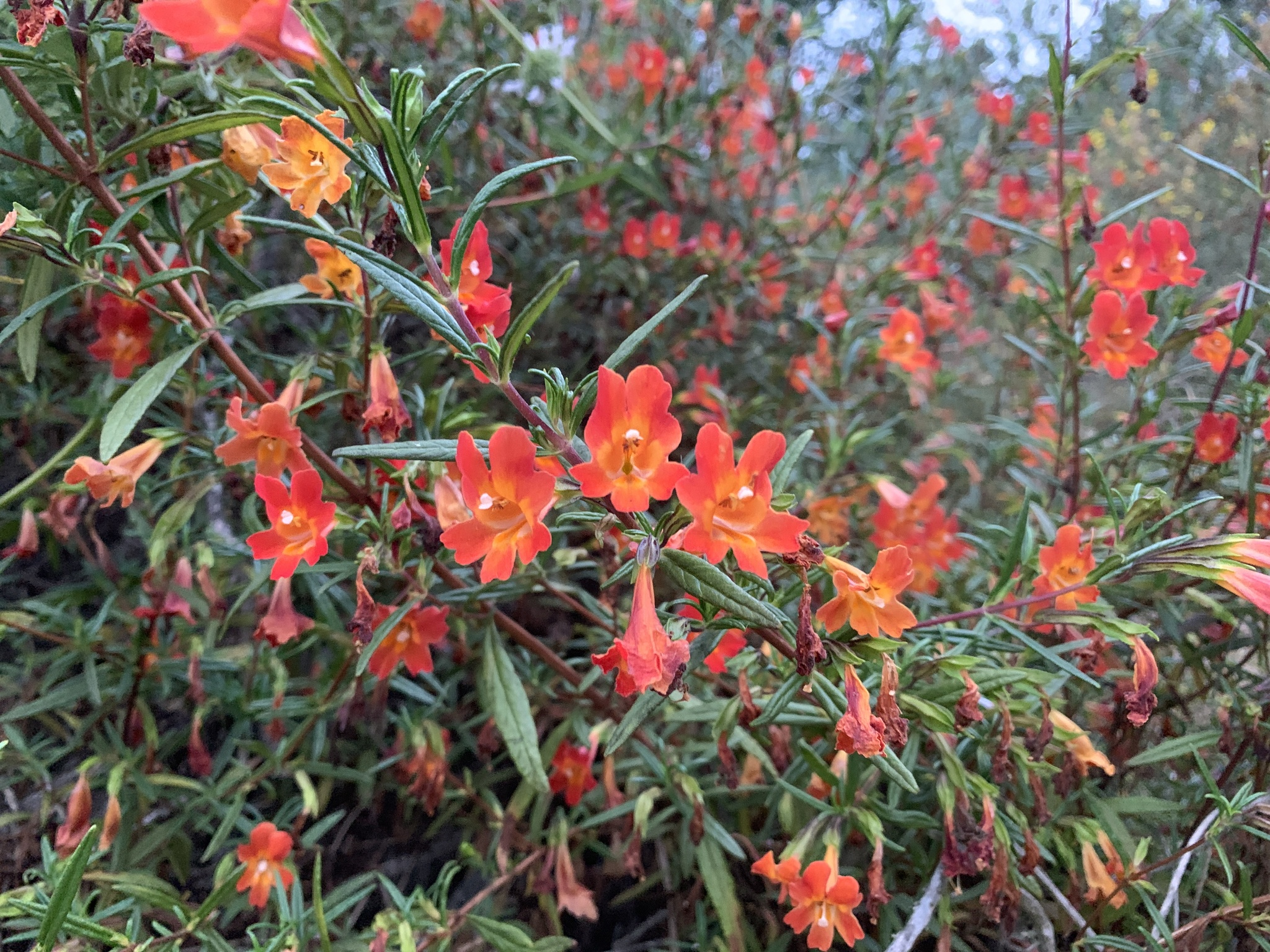
Flowering in habitat.

This plant is a glabrous (free from hair) evergreen subshrub or shrub, growing perennially. The entire plant on average is 24 in (60 cm) tall and 36 in (90 cm) wide.

The leaves are generally shaped linear-lanceolate, and more or less entire, with the tip of the leaves acute. The leaf margins (edges) are tightly rolled under, and the leaf is uniformly green, lacking hair. There are two to four flowers emerging per node. The pedicels are 9 to 22 mm long, the calyx is 19 to 27 mm large, and the throat of the corolla tube is 27 to 35 mm long. The corolla is slightly decurved, and colored a dark orange to red.

Flowering is from March to June.

== Taxonomy ==
This plant has a chromosome count of 2n = 20. It is known to hybridize with Diplacus × australis. It is suspected to be one of the parents of D. × australis, along with D. longiflorus.

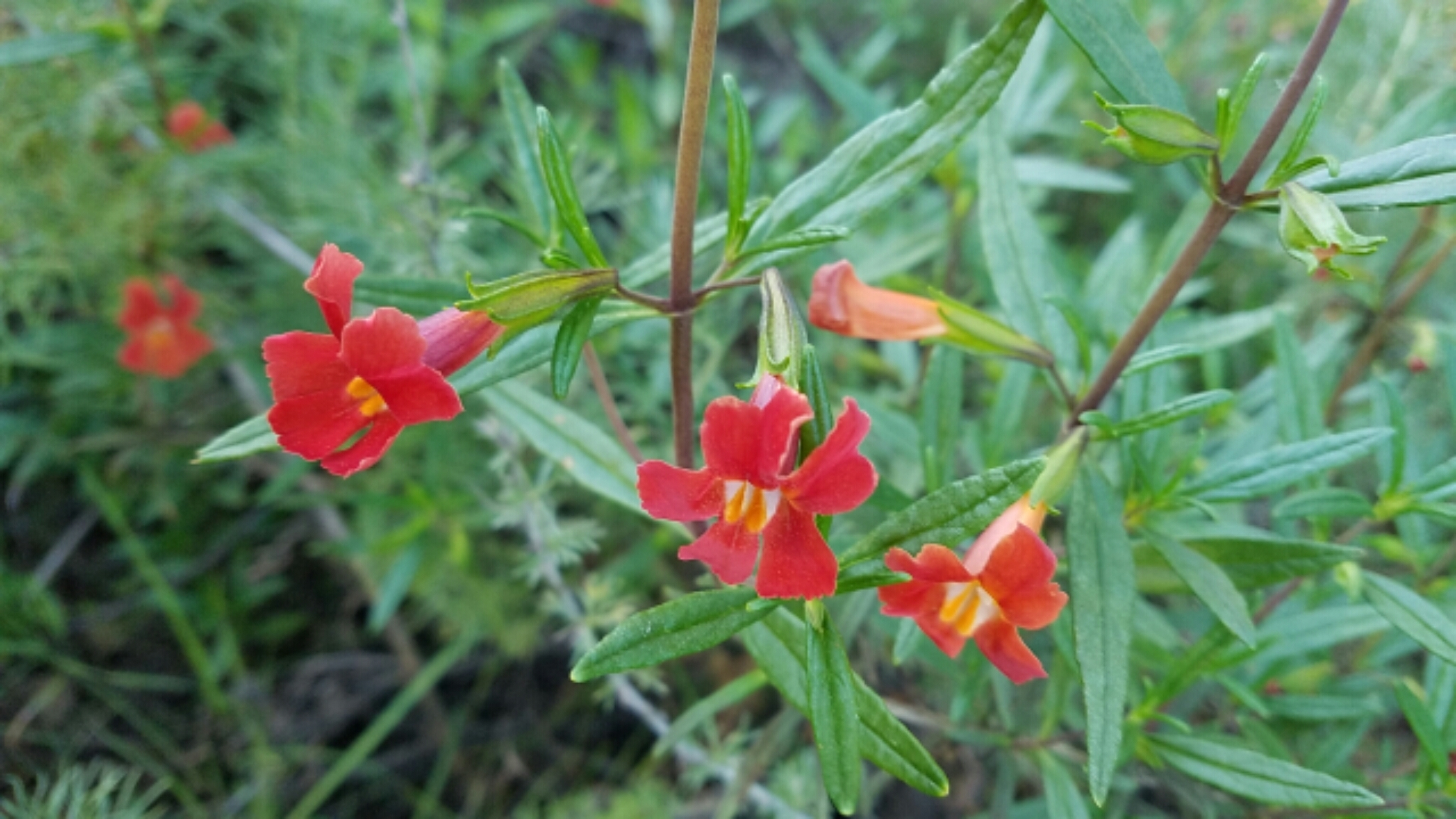
Flowers.

The type specimen was collected from San Diego in 1836 by Thomas Nutall.

== Distribution and habitat ==
This plant occurs throughout Southern California, occupying granite outcrops, openings in the chaparral, and disturbed areas, from an elevation of 100 to 700 meters. It is primarily found in abundance in the coastal regions of San Diego County and Orange County, along with Riverside County. In Baja California the plant is also found along the Pacific Coast, from the vicinity of Tijuana south to El Rosario.

== Horticulture ==
It is hardy from USDA zones 9a to 11. It prefers well drained, sandy soils with a pH level between 6 and 8. It tolerates drought conditions.
