= Rue Mapp =

American outdoor enthusiast and environmentalist

- Education: University of California, Berkeley
- Occupation: CEO
- Organisation: Outdoor Afro
- Known for: Hiking
- Awards: Heinz Award
- Website: ruemapp.com

Rue Mapp is an American outdoor enthusiast and environmentalist who works to reconnect Black communities with nature. She is the founder and CEO of Outdoor Afro, a nonprofit organization.

== Early life and education ==
Mapp grew up in Oakland, California. Her parents originally moved to Oakland to escape the Jim Crow south. As a child, she spent time outdoors at her parents' cabin in Lake County, California hiking and swimming, to which she attributes her love of nature.

She graduated from the University of California, Berkeley with a Bachelor of Arts in art history.

== Career ==
Mapp worked for the Golden Gate Audubon Society and as an analyst for Morgan Stanley. She originally considered enrolling in business school, but decided instead to pursue a venture combining both community and her love of the outdoors. In 2009, she created Outdoor Afro as a blog to help "reconnect Black people to the outdoors", before it grew into a nonprofit organization with over 60,000 participants. While making some of her initial posts, she notes that she didn't encounter many other Black people while camping, and found herself thinking about the caution needed when encountering other campers. As of 2019, Outdoor Afro has over 60,000 active members and works with volunteers across 30 different states.

In 2010, Mapp was invited to the White House as part of the Obama administration's America's Great Outdoors Initiative. In 2015, she was appointed as a voting commissioner of California State Parks. In 2021, she started the Black Heritage Hunt, a duck hunting event in Sacramento, California, to encourage Black hunters.

During the COVID-19 pandemic, Mapp wrote Nature Swagger: Stories and Visions of Black Joy in the Outdoors, a book based on her outdoor experiences intend to represent Black people as "strong, beautiful, and free". Nature Swagger was published in November 2022.

== Awards and honors ==
- In 2012, Mapp was named as one of the most influential African Americans in the country by The Root
- In 2019, Mapp received the Heinz Award in honor of her stewardship of natural resources
- In 2019, Mapp was named a National Geographic fellow
- In 2021, Mapp received the AFAR Travel Vanguard award
