= Santa Clarita Woodlands Park =

Open space preserve in Los Angeles County, California

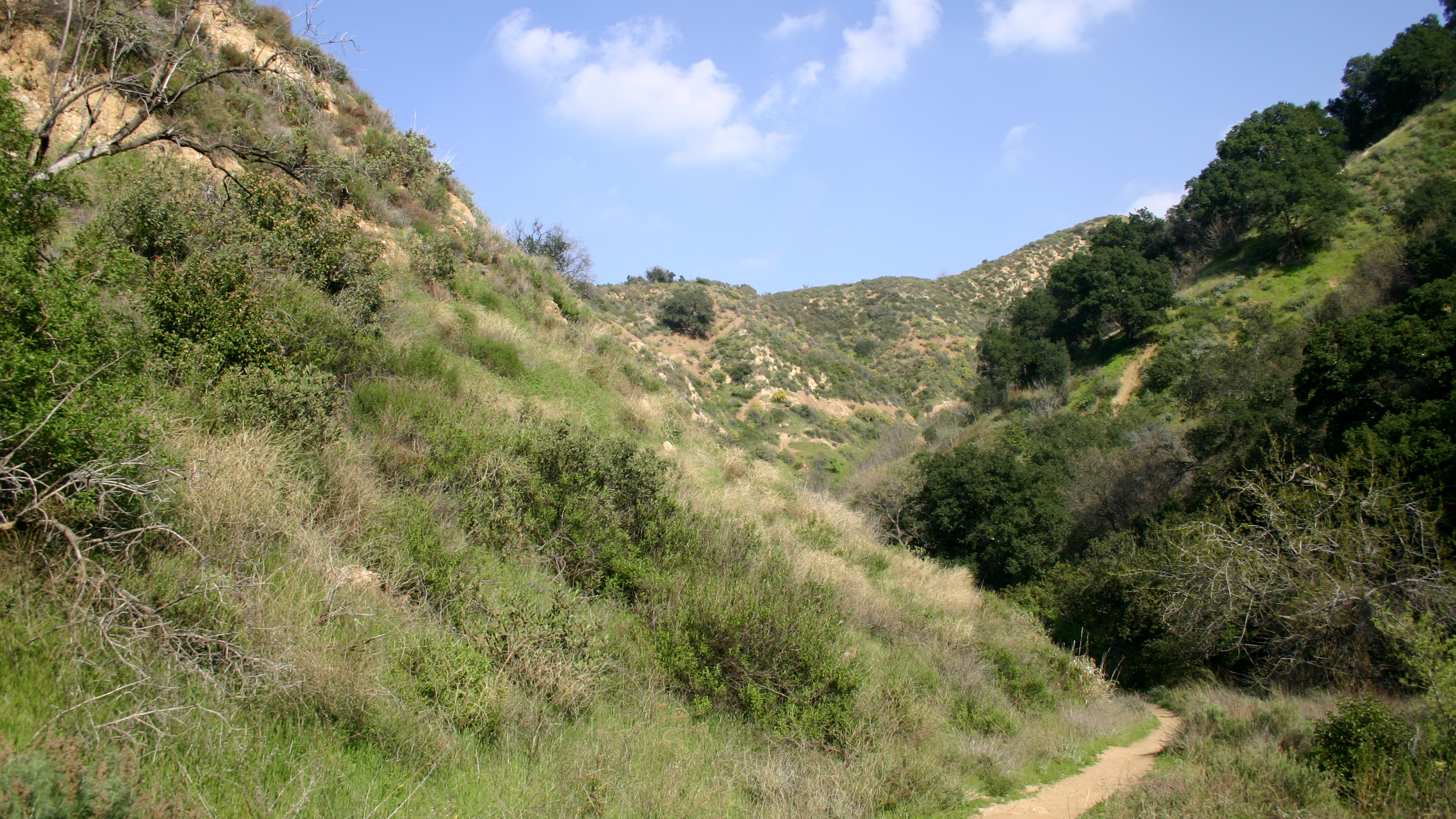
- Towsley Canyon

- Location within Santa Clarita Location within the Los Angeles metropolitan area Location within California
- Nearest city: Santa Clarita, California, United States
- Coordinates: 34°20′58″N 118°33′29″W
- Area: 4,000 acres (16 km^{2})
- Governing body: Mountains Recreation and Conservation Authority (MRCA)

Santa Clarita Woodlands Park is a 4,000 acre (1,619 hectare) open space preserve located in the northeastern foothills of the Santa Susana Mountains near Santa Clarita, California.

== Geography ==
The park borders the city of Santa Clarita to the northeast, Newhall Ranch Open Space to the northwest, Michael D. Antonovich Open Space to the southeast, and an open space preserve managed by the Bureau of Land Management to the southwest.

=== Park units ===
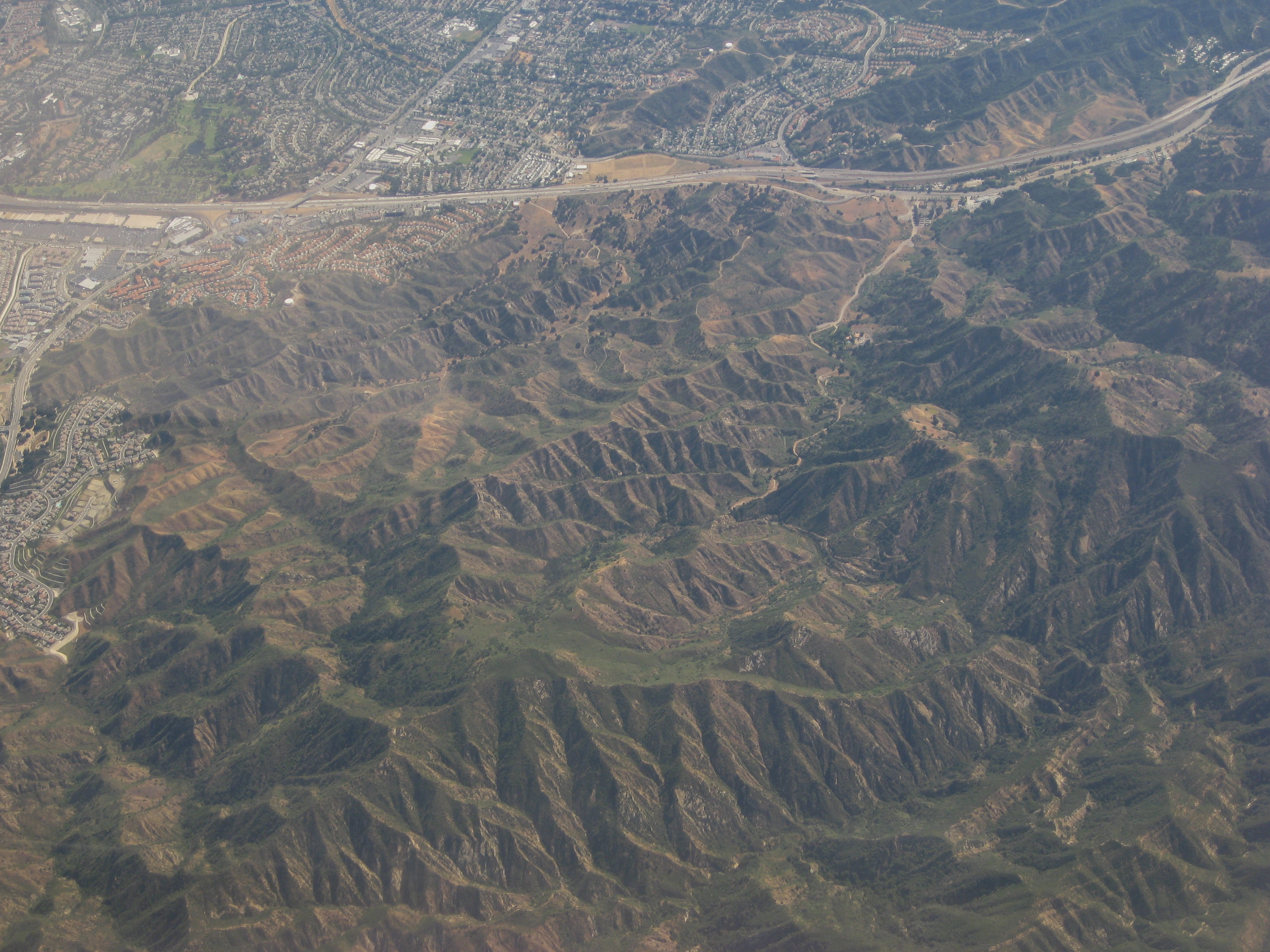
Aerial view of Santa Clarita Woodlands Park from the west, showing hiking trails in and around Towsley Canyon

The park includes four recreation areas:

- Ed Davis Park preserves the chaparral ecology and recreational integrity of Towsley and Wiley Canyons. Towsley Lodge, a historic Spanish-style ranch house, is located beside Towsley Creek at the foot of Towsley Canyon.
- The East and Rice Canyons unit, located southeast of Ed Davis Park, preserves a diverse plant community and a small collection of natural oil seeps.
- The Pico Canyon unit, located northwest of Ed Davis Park, preserves the chaparral ecology of Pico Canyon. The canyon is the site of the Pico Canyon Oilfield where the first commercially successful oil well in the western United States was drilled in 1876.
- Mentryville Park, located at the entrance to the Pico Canyon unit, preserves the historic ghost town of Mentryville.

== Ecology ==
The park preserves a mountainous expanse of coastal sage and chaparral habitat. Resident mammal species include bobcat, coyote, red-tailed hawk, and desert cottontail.

== See also ==
- Santa Clarita Valley
- Open space accessibility in California
