= Open space accessibility in California =

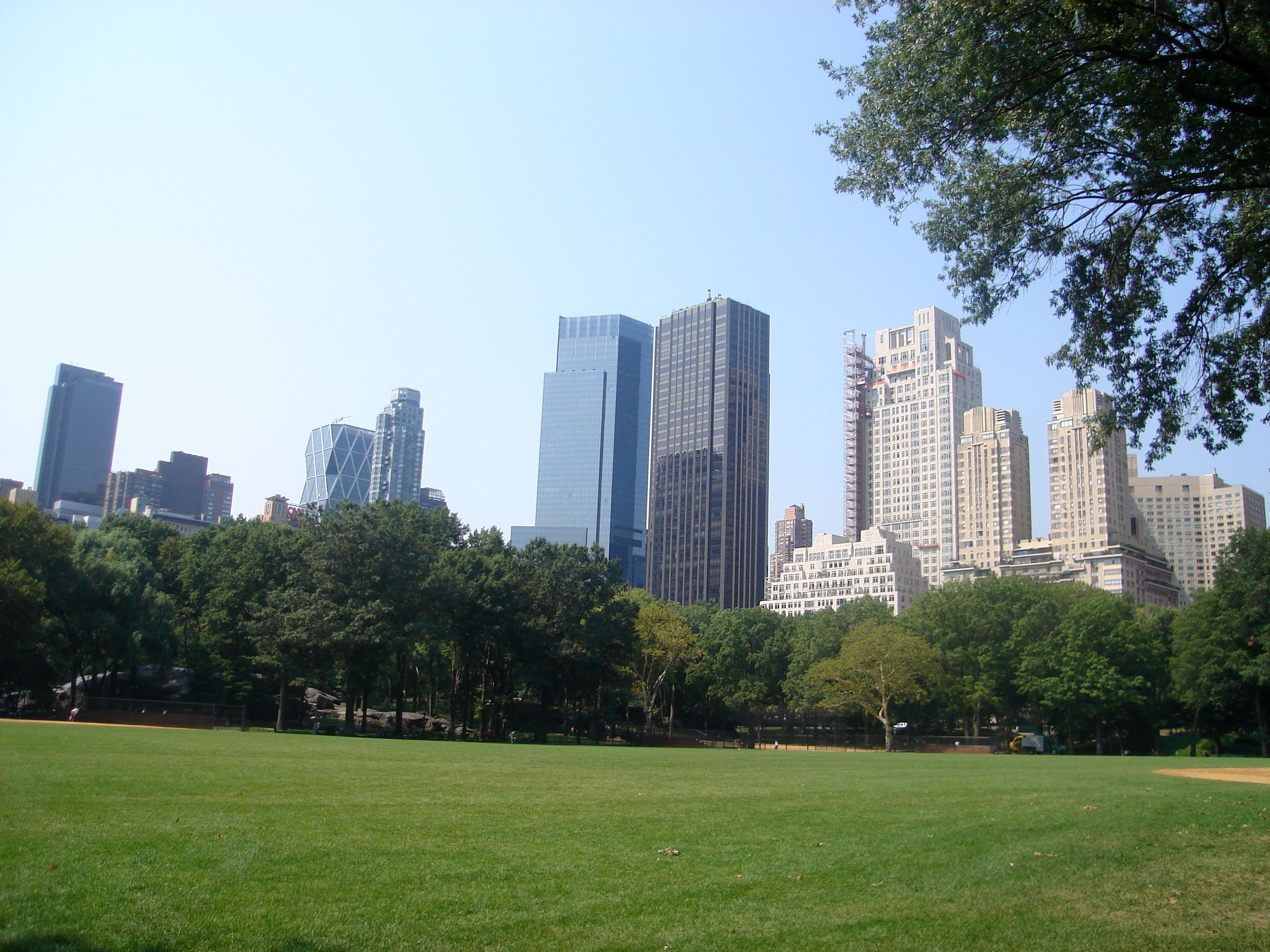
Urban open space

Open spaces in urban environments, such as parks, playgrounds, and natural areas, can provide many health, cultural, recreational, and economic benefits to the communities nearby. However, access to open spaces can be unequal for people of different incomes. In California's two largest metropolitan regions, Los Angeles County in Southern California and the Bay Area in Northern California, access to green space and natural areas varies with the predominant races and classes of the communities. This also holds true in San Diego County in Southern California. Both expanding urbanization and diminishing funding for open space tend to widen these gaps in accessibility. Because open space is associated with various mental and physical benefits, a lack of access to it can pose health consequences. However, more research is needed to determine whether such environmental inequalities translate into long-term health inequalities, and, if so, how.

== Benefits ==
There are many benefits of open space. Access to open space has been shown by studies to positively correlate with physical activity levels, provide cultural exchange and cohesion, present recreational opportunities, stimulate economic productivity, and provide environmental benefits to counter the effects of climate change in surrounding neighborhoods.

=== Health ===
Green spaces indirectly influence the physical activity levels in a community. The accessibility of green space for citizens has been shown to directly correlate to their physical activity levels. Lower levels of physical activity leads to many health consequences, such as heart disease, obesity, and depression. For example, teenagers without access to a safe parks report significantly less exercise and worse physical health than their counterparts with access to a park. Anger and aggressiveness are often alleviated with increased time in open space. Additionally, psychological benefits increase with species richness of urban green spaces, implying that quality, not just access, affects the health benefits of natural parks in urban environments. Studies have found that pregnancy outcomes improve when pregnant women have access to a park or natural preserve, and people with easy access to national and local parks have higher-quality sleep.

=== Cultural ===
Open spaces can be accessed by a diverse group of people in an urban community, allowing greater community cohesion as well as cultural exchange and interaction. Many native people have close ties to open space and often find them historically and culturally significant. Additionally, open space often serves as a source of inspiration to many in a community; for example spurring cultural creativity in the form of arts and literature. Cultural events are often held at parks. These include dances, films, and music festivals. Parks can serve to further the education of children in the community by allowing them to learn by experience and play. They allow children to avoid social problems, such as gang violence and vandalism, commonly associated with cities, and to play with peers and become aware of their community's events and political structures. Crime is often mitigated with increased open space, because people become less aggressive with increased exposure to nature. Conversely, letting spaces remain barren and failing to make them into parks or community spaces often increases crime.

=== Recreational ===
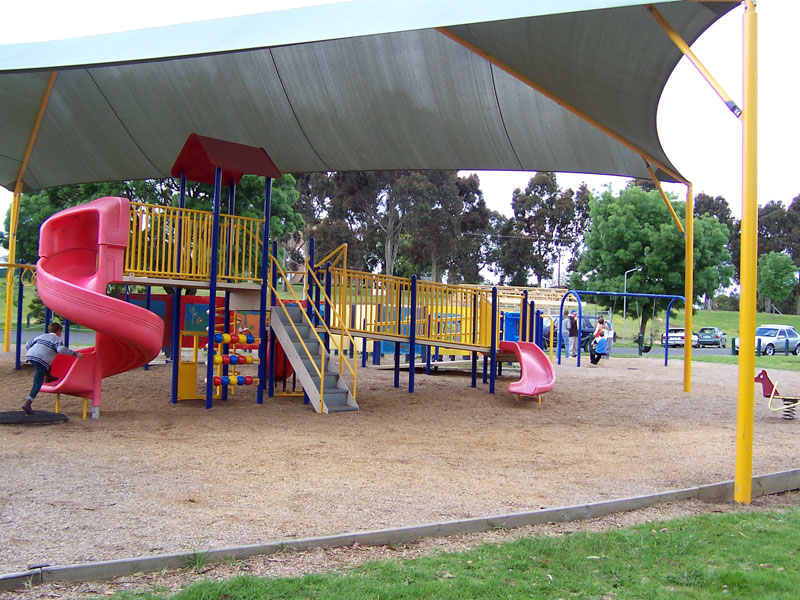
Playgrounds in parks can provide recreation and learning for the children in the surrounding community.

Open spaces serve as places where people in the community can meet and socialize through a wide array of various activities; this includes accessing food by fishing and hunting, enjoying biodiversity by observing wildlife, and exercising by walking or hiking. These recreational opportunities can be applied to any age group; kids may be educated and can play at parks while adults can find positive community at parks. Urban parks serve as places where sports games can be held, and often attract recreation by integrating paintings, museums, zoos, memorials, and cultural centers into their designs.

=== Economic ===
Open spaces generate revenue through increasing local tourism, businesses, real estate values, and jobs, and decrease the many costs of diseases associated with nature deficit disorder. However, poorly managed parks often decrease local real estate values. The economic stimulus to real estate values potentially serves to raise tax revenue, part of which can be used to develop more parks, a positive feedback loop. The stimulus to real estate is most evident in dense urban areas since these areas are most in need of such spaces. Open spaces within developments also increase their walkability and serve to stimulate real estate prices. Recreational industries are often attracted to areas with open space because they present major sales opportunities. This further enhances job growth and opportunity, and potentially stimulates workers' talent and productivity because close access to nature increases their quality of life. It also keeps wealthy retirees in the community who may serve as a continuing source of income or social buffer. If forests are present, their harvests also may serve as a sustainable source of income to the local economy. Parks also may serve to economically revitalize a failed or defunct commercial area within a community. Open space naturally executes processes such as stormwater management and flood control, which can limit public costs from catastrophic weather events.

=== Environmental ===
Open spaces provide environmental benefits to both local residents and wildlife. Due to climate change, heat waves are becoming more frequent and intense. These heat waves can be mitigated by parks through a reduced heat island effect. The air temperature in parks tends to be cooler than the air temperature in urban environments and this cool air may spread to nearby neighborhoods, reducing the need for air conditioning on hot days. Parks can also help mitigate urban pollution through air filtration by trees and UV radiation through shade provided by tree canopies. Parks limit the environmental damage of heavy storm-induced floods and filter pollutants from water before it enters streams and groundwater. Even small community parks may serve as refuges for wildlife that do not need significant amounts of continuous habitat to survive, and connections across parks allow larger fauna to survive as well. These environmental and health benefits associated with parks are estimated to be worth billions of dollars annually.

However, although parks reduce air pollution, certain demographics and low income areas may experience higher levels of pollution in parks; a study based in Los Angeles found that children in Hispanic dominated neighborhoods had higher levels of exposure to NO_{2} and particulate matter than their counterparts. The researchers notes that physical activity, which often occurs in open spaces, could increase the risk that these park air pollutants are inhaled, leading to serious health consequences.

== Accessibility ==
California has the 3rd largest land area in the United States, covering 155,779.22 square miles (99,698,700.8 acres). Of that area, 47,570,065 acres are open access to the public. However, California's population is clustered in just 3 regions, Southern California, the Bay Area, and the Central Valley, regions separated from this public land. Studies by the California Department of Parks and Recreation system show that, of all California residents, nearly a quarter do not live within a half-mile of a park of any kind, and only 38% of all California residents live in an area that has 3 or more acres of land per 1000 residents.

=== General ===
==== Environmental justice initiatives ====
Beginning in the mid-20th century, equal housing and resource opportunities were initiated to counteract policies in California that were criticized as discriminatory, such as California Proposition 14 (1964). Federally, Shelley v. Kraemer and Barrows vs. Jackson nullified any ordinances supporting housing agreements that discriminated by race. The Unruh Civil Rights Act and Rumford Fair Housing Act also served to guarantee protection from discrimination based on race in housing and employment. However, historical discrimination has led to distinctly segregated housing patterns across race and continued to do so despite the new laws.

Many governmental agencies have committed to making open space and parks more accessible to all. In 2002, Proposition 40 was passed in California, which provided funding for clean water and air, safe neighborhood parks, and coastal protection. Part of the funding went into a program called the Urban Park Act. This was overseen by the California Department of Parks and Recreation and provided funding for projects to develop parks in communities without access to open spaces or recreation facilities.

In 2008, California signed into law AB 31, which designates park funds for communities that are financially deprived and have significantly less open space. In 2010, former President Barack Obama implemented the America's Great Outdoors Initiative to expand green space and physical activity. The initiative aims to bring Americans closer to their natural environment, increase the number of green jobs, and educate Americans on the environment. It will provide funds to local governments and agencies to implement new parks and recreation opportunities.

In 2008, the Southern California Association of Governments emphasized that "a multi-agency effort" must be made to alleviate unequal park accessibility. In many communities, a Transit to Trails program is in the process of proposal or implementation to transport underprivileged minorities without cars to public parks for physical recreation and environmental education. Transit to Trails can be led by tour guides and be coordinated with school districts who help promote the latter goal. Making park systems interconnected rather than separated has been proposed in various California communities to increase accessibility across parks and neighborhoods. Community gardens can also give young people in inner-city school districts the opportunity of environmental education as well as healthier eating patterns in the midst of food desert crises.

One of the main policies that addresses open space access in California is the Quimby Act. The Quimby Act was passed in 1975 and requires all new developers to set aside land or pay fees when bringing new lands in a city under development. These fees are used by the city to develop parks in the area of the new subdivision to serve the residents living there. On September 28, 2013, however, CA Governor Jerry Brown amended the Quimby Act to allow the city to use funds to develop new parks in areas other than the one where the development is built, where there are fewer than three acres of park area per 1000 residents.

The California Department of Parks and Recreation's Office of Community Involvement states, "Our mission is to promote the means and facilitate the methods by which California State Parks' services, facilities, and parks become meaningful and relevant to all Californians. OCI continues to develop and implement programs that increase services to non-traditional park users and under-served communities." As such, CA Parks and Rec offers various programs and initiatives serving families and communities who may not otherwise be able to utilize the park systems. FamCamp, introduced in 1994, is a state program offering camping experience in areas throughout California that includes all gear (such as tents, sleeping bags, lanterns, etc.) at no cost. Similarly, the Outdoor Youth Connection program offers teenagers opportunities to experience the outdoors and develop skills at no cost.

California Department of Parks and Recreation offers the Golden Bear Pass, a reduced fee pass to all California State Parks available to all California residents who receive SSI or various other financial assistance programs. This program is a significant boost in access to persons who may otherwise not have access to state parks due to admission fees.

==== Barriers to equal accessibility ====
In early 20th century California, minorities were often segregated by housing covenants, legally permissible until 1947. City ordinances served to further limit minority rights to equal housing and public resources. In 1964, Proposition 14 was voted into law by California voters and permitted property sellers to exclude sales to those whom they saw as undesirable. The law was deemed unconstitutional by the courts in 1967. These laws have shaped today's housing patterns by race in California.

A lack of property taxes and small budgets to balance inhibits cities from investing in maintaining open space or creating urban parks. For example, California Proposition 13 (1978) caused tax cuts that have affected urban budgets for open spaces. Many recreational centers closed or reduced hours, making it difficult for people who work late hours, such as working-class minorities, to find recreational parks open for their use. Conversely, affluent residents have more financial capital to impose user fees that enable their neighborhood's parks to be maintained, resulting in uneven distribution. Similarly, the Quimby Act has increased park availability more in rich suburbs than in poor cities. Because the frequency of green space use decreases as residential distance from the green space increases, residents of poor neighborhoods, where parks are further away, are much less likely to use the few parks that are available.

In 2009, California Republican Governor Arnold Schwarzenegger initiated efforts through the state legislature to close 33% of parks in efforts to reduce costs. In August 2009, an administrative complaint against this action was filed against the proposal with various federal agencies. The following month, Schwarzenegger ultimately decided that, in lieu of closing the parks, maintenance and hours would be significantly cut.

There simultaneously exists both park scarcity and low park usage. This stems from the distance of parks from most residents, along with park safety concerns: crime tends to discourage usage of parks, even if they are nearby. Even when parks are close to low income communities, their small size may not serve large groups within communities. Also, some parks may go unused by racial or ethnic minority groups if they lack culturally specific, multi-purpose designs. On the same note, these parks are often poorly maintained, further decreasing their usage.

In 2017, US President Donald Trump proposed for the 2018 budget a $1.5 billion cut to the US Department of the Interior, which is in charge of managing National Parks, a major source of open space in the country. The cut also reduces funding for National Heritage Areas, considered sacred by many Native American tribes.

=== Los Angeles County ===
				Public Access Open Space Area		Total Protected Land Area		Racial Distribution								Income	
County	Population (2010)	Total Area (sq mile)	Population Density	Acres	%	Acres	%	White	African American	Native American	Asian	Pacific Islander	Other Race	Two or More Races	Hispanic or Latino	Per Capita (2011)	Median Household (2011)
Los Angeles	9,818,605	4,751 sq mi (12,310 km2)	2,100/sq mi (800/km2)	835,106	27.5%	905,059	29.8%	4,936,599 (50%)	856,874 (9%)	72,828 (0.7%)	1,346,865 (13.7%)	26,094 (0.3%)	2,140,632 (21.8%)	438,713 (4.5%)	4,687,889 (48%)	$27,954	$56,266

==== Environmental justice initiatives ====
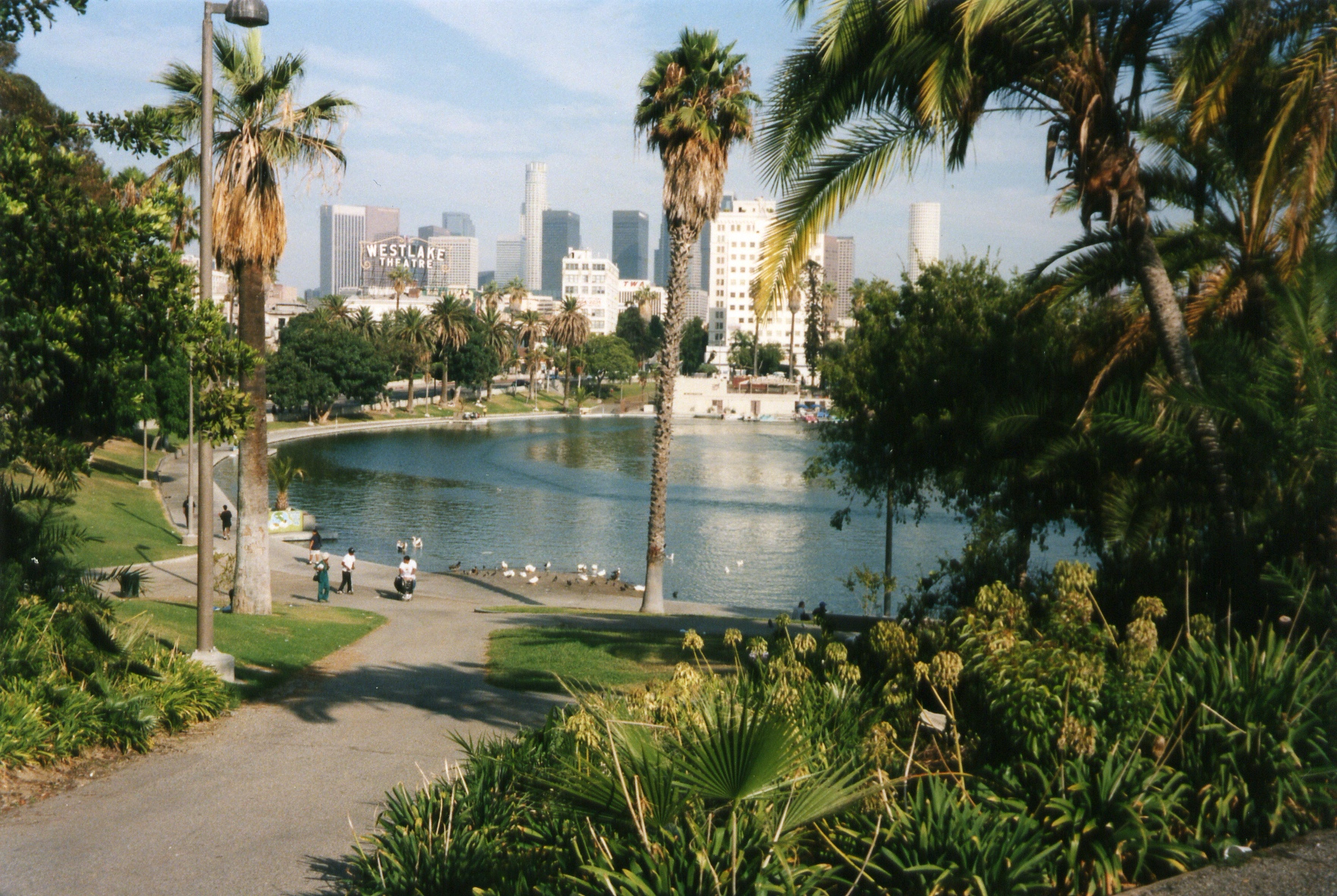
Macarthur Park near Downtown Los Angeles.

There are many ongoing efforts to expand park accessibility in LA. Many former junkyards or abandoned lands are being converted into parks. For example, Estrella Park in South Los Angeles, formerly an auto-repair junkyard, was created by the California Community Foundation and local schoolchildren in 1982. In 2004, when the Park had become degraded after years of poor maintenance, the Neighborhood Land Trust began repairing the Park so that it could reopen in 2006. In Koreatown, Francis Community Park had been long regarded as a dumpsite until efforts by First Unitarian Church of Los Angeles and Urban Ministries helped re-purpose it in 1996. It has since become the Moothart Collington Community Garden and been managed by the Neighborhood Land Trust and funded by Proposition K. Markson Street Pocket Park in Panorama City had been an abandoned parcel of neglected land until its opening in 2006, with the aid of the Neighborhood Land Trust. Since then, many recreational and cultural programs, such as dancing and nutrition classes, have been held there. In South Los Angeles, Erika J. Glazer Community Garden for years had been a polluted parcel until community efforts restored it in 2008. Despite threats of sale at a public auction, the Garden was acquired for permanent protection by the Land Trust in 2012. A year later, the Land Trust also acquired a .62-acre parcel of land in West Athens and subsequently installed gardens, a small trail, fruit trees, and meeting space. It is now called the West Athens Victory Garden.

Efforts are underway to expand the Santa Monica Mountains National Recreation Area, which currently is surrounded by predominately non-Hispanic white, affluent neighborhoods, including Westlake Village, Calabasas, and Malibu. Recently, President Barack Obama designated the San Gabriel Mountains as a National Monument, which is surrounded by predominately Hispanic neighborhoods (64%). In doing so, he issued the following statement:

"We heard from the community, that for a lot of urban families, this is their only big outdoor space. Too many children in L.A. County, especially children of color, don't have access to parks where they can run free, breathe fresh air, experience nature, and learn about their environment. This is an issue of social justice. Because it's not enough to have this awesome natural wonder within your sight -– you have to be able to access it."

Representative Judy Chu (D-CA) has introduced legislation that protects the Angeles National Forest and the San Gabriel Mountains, two major sources of the limited open space in Los Angeles County. The bill also creates a public advisory council that will represent people of color and low-income people.

Additionally, to help address the car scarcity commonly found among poor people of color in LA, the National Park Service's Transit to Trails pilot program intends to expand educational and recreational opportunities and limit traffic congestion by transporting inner city, disadvantaged residents to various natural reserves. This includes buses to the Santa Monica National Recreation Area and nearby oceans and rivers.

Greening the Los Angeles River is another form of progress in expanding park access to underprivileged residents. These river revitalization projects intend to establish guidelines for proper use, expand development opportunities, enhance river-adjacent communities, improve river water quality, increase public accessibility to rivers and recreational spaces, educate the surrounding communities on the importance of the maintenance of the river, and preserve the flood control features of the river. In 2002, Councilmember Ed Reyes formed and became Committee Chair of the Los Angeles City Council Ad Hoc Committee, which in 2005 asked the City's Bureau of Engineering to plan the 20-year-long river revitalization project. Public participation has been stressed in this process through workshops in neighborhoods surrounding the River, extending from Griffith Park to downtown Los Angeles. In 2016, the Integrated Feasibility Report, composed of the Final Feasibility Report and Environmental Impact Statement, was prepared. In May and June 2016, the Board of Public Works and City Council reviewed the Report; in late June, the City Council approved the Report.

In the Los Angeles Unified School District, a measure was passed to guarantee nutritional and physical education and corresponding community gardens and recreational space to children in public schools. This took place after a political campaign was waged by concerned community members to raise awareness on the statistical inequalities of physical fitness in schools that are linked to inaccessibility to high quality physical education and green space. The Los Angeles Department of City Planning established objectives to increase the amount of open spaces in areas such as Southeast and South Central Los Angeles where few open spaces currently exist. The goal of this objective is to work with the members of the community to ensure that the open space and recreation facilities created contribute to the stability of the community. So far, 150 campuses have gardens from which students can eat and get an agricultural education, and 26 have SchoolYard Habitats where students can observe wildlife. 300 school campuses have implemented some form of community gardens, including Fremont High School, located in an inner-city Los Angeles neighborhood, 42% of whose students fail physical fitness exams. A Wellness Center with a low-cost medicinal facility and neighborhood park, among other amenities, has also been added to Fremont High, to make the project a total of 1.5 acres of green space. The Sustainable Environment Enhancement Developments for Schools (SEEDS) program funds these projects, such as those at Hancock Park Elementary School and Pueblo de Los Angeles High School; the Local District Northwest Environmental Sustainability Challenge brings native gardens onto regional campuses; the Nutritional Ed/Obesity Prevention (NEOP) program provides gardens and open spaces for 41 schools; and Nature Explore Classrooms provide outdoor curriculum activities to 3 Early Educational Centers.

==== Barriers to equal accessibility ====
Of the five major West Coast cities, LA has the least park acreage per 1,000 residents and the least city space devoted to parks; additionally, it has the lowest per capita expenditure for parks. Only 55% of the residents in the city of Los Angeles had walkable access to parks in a 2016 report. Evidence also reveals inequalities in open space accessibility by race:

Latino-dominated neighborhoods: 1.6 acres per 1,000 population;

African-American-dominated neighborhoods: 0.8 acres per 1,000 population;

Asian-Pacific-Islander-dominated neighborhoods: 1.2 acres per 1,000 population; and

White-dominated neighborhoods: 17.4 acres per 1,000 population.

In Los Angeles County, non-Hispanic whites are 12–15 times as likely as Latinos and African Americans to have more park acreage per capita. This pattern relates to a negative correlation between park space and economic hardship: as surrounding areas have more park space, those areas tend to suffer less from poverty and financial need. Obesity and other diseases are more predominant in majority-minority neighborhoods. An inverse correlation between premature mortality and childhood obesity and available park space exists, i.e., there is a greater risk of premature mortality and childhood obesity with less park space.

Proposition K passed in the city of Los Angeles to allocate $25 million annually for improvements to parks, recreational facilities, and playgrounds in need of repair. Some opposed to Proposition K write that much of the funding from the policy was allocated to parks in affluent neighborhoods, which exacerbated the gaps in accessibility to open space.

Additionally, in Los Angeles inner-city residents, who are much more likely to be poor minorities, have significantly fewer parks than suburban residents. Furthermore, there is less likely to be proper maintenance at inner-city parks. Parks may play different roles in the lives of inner-city youth than they do for suburban, wealthy youth, who are more likely to have the backyards and private play areas that inner-city youth lack.

=== San Francisco Bay area ===
				Public Access Open Space Area		Total Protected Land Area		Racial Distribution								Income	
County	Population (2010)	Total Area (sq mile)	Population Density	Acres	%	Acres	%	White	African American	Native American	Asian	Pacific Islander	Other Race	Two or More Races	Hispanic or Latino	Per Capita (2011)	Median Household (2011)
Alameda	1,510,271	821 sq mi (2,130 km2)	2,047.6 sq mi	65,354	12.4%	119,654	22.8%	649,122 (43.0%)	190,451 (12.6%)	9,799 (0.6%)	394,560 (26.1%)	12,802 (0.8%)	162,540 (10.8%)	90,997 (6.0%)	339,889 (22.5%)	$34,937	$70821
Contra Costa	1,049,025	804 sq mi (2,080 km2)	1,300 sq mi (500/km2)	87,099	16.9%	139,176	27.0%	614,512 (58.6%)	97,161 (9.3%)	6,122 (0.6%)	151,469 (14.4%)	4,845 (0.5%)	112,691 (10.7%)	62,225 (5.9%)	255,560 (24.4%)	$38,141	$79,135
Marin	252,409	828 sq mi (2,140 km2)	300 sq mi (120 km2)	156,987	29.6%	162,423	30.7%	201,963 (80.0%)	6,987 (2.8%)	1,523 (0.6%)	13,761 (5.5%)	509 (0.2%)	16,973 (6.7%)	10,693 (4.2%)	39,069 (15.5%)	$54,605	$89,605
Napa	136,484	789 sq mi (2,040 km2)	190sq mi (70 km2)	105,361	20.9%	130,886	25.9%	97,525 (71.5%)	2,668 (2.0%)	1,058 (0.8%)	9,223 (6.8%)	372 (0.3%)	20,058 (14.7%)	5,580 (4.1%)	44,010 (32.2%)	$35,309	$68,641
San Francisco	805,235	231.89 sq mi (600.6 km2)	18,451 sq mi (7,124 km2)	5,632	3.8%	5,750	3.9%	390,387 (48.1%)	48,870 (6.1%)	4,024 (0.5%)	267,915 (33.3%)	3,359 (0.4%)	53,021 (6.6%)	37,659 (4.7%)	121,744 (15.1%)	$46,777	$72,947
San Mateo	718,451	741 sq mi (1,920 km2)	1,693 sq mi (654 km2)	53,942	11.4%	112,805	23.8%	383,535 (53.4%)	20,436 (2.8%)	3,306 (0.5%)	178,118 (24.8%)	10,317 (1.4%)	84,529 (11.8%)	38,210 (5.3%)	182,502 (25.4%)	$45,346	$87,633
Santa Clara	1,781,642	1,304 sq mi (3,380 km2)	1,400 sq mi (530 km2)	141,519	17.0%	212,117	25.4%	836,616 (47.0%)	46,428 (2.6%)	12,960 (0.7%)	570,524 (32.0%)	7,060 (0.4%)	220,806 (12.4%)	87,248 (4.9%)	479,210 (26.9%)	$40,698	$89,064
Solano	413,344	906 sq mi (2,350 km2)	460 sq mi (180 km2)	16,550	2.9%	62,141	10.7%	210,751 (51.0%)	60,750 (14.7%)	3,212 (0.8%)	60,473 (14.6%)	3,564 (0.9%)	43,236 (10.5%)	31,358 (7.6%)	99,356 (24.0%)	$29,367	$69,914
Sonoma	483,878	1,768 sq mi (4,580 km2)	270 sq mi (110 km2)	75,304	6.7%	140,411	12.4%	371,412 (76.8%)	7,610 (1.6%)	6,489 (1.3%)	18,341 (3.8%)	1,558 (0.3%)	56,966 (11.8%)	21,502 (4.4%)	120,430 (24.9%)	$33,119	$64,343

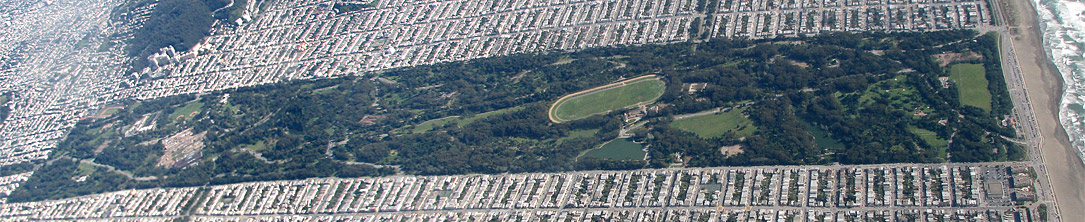
Golden Gate Park in San Francisco provides recreation, cultural events, and health benefits for many residents of the city.

There have been strong conservation efforts in the Bay Area since the 19th century that have preserved over one million acres of land. This amounts to approximately one-third of the San Francisco Bay Area. Today, the San Francisco Bay has the most protected open space of any major metropolitan region in the United States, with protected lands ranging from small city parks to large natural preserves. Also, parks and green spaces receive significant funding from taxes; voters consistently choose to invest taxpayer money into regional and state parks.

==== Environmental justice initiatives ====
Some cities have taken on policies to directly address unequal access to open space. For example, Berkeley, a city in the East San Francisco Bay Area, has adopted policies to ensure that new facilities and open spaces are prioritized for low income and under-served communities in the city. The city of San Francisco has also undertaken several policies to increase access to open space as part of their most recent General Plan. Objectives included ensuring a well-maintained, highly utilized, and integrated open space system; increasing the connectivity of open space; and engaging communities in the stewardship of their recreation programs and open spaces. In the plan, the city outlined how they would target specific areas that were deemed "vulnerable" (low-income, minority, former Superfund sites) which would receive more funding and more intensive focus from the City (including the Recreation and Parks Department, the Port of San Francisco, and Office of Community Investment and Infrastructure).

The San Francisco Recreation and Parks Department has instituted the "Greenagers" program for teenage San Franciscans who are from Bayview, Bayview Heights, Crocker Amazon, Excelsior, Hunter's Point, Mission Terrace, Outer Mission, Portola, Silver Terrace, and Visitacion Valley. These neighborhoods are some of the most low-income and minority-concentrated neighborhoods in the city of San Francisco. Likewise, the Candlestick Point Eco-Stewards, based out of Candlestick Point State Recreation Area in the Bayview District of San Francisco, focuses on ecological restoration and connection to natural heritage. Their goal is to focus on ecological restoration and reconnect residents to their natural heritage and to a healthy and biologically diverse natural environment. The CPES project is unique in that it seeks to link community environmental health and economic well-being with access to clean, high-quality open space in southeast San Francisco. Various methods of engagement with the Candlestick Point community that the Eco-Stewards have developed include habitat restoration service learning for high school students, environmental leadership opportunities for kids, a community native plant nursery, and community habitat restoration in areas such as Yosemite Slough and other sites.

Cities also address open space access through the development of public educational parks and gardens in the Bay Area. The California Department of Education made it a goal in their mission statement to put "a garden in every school". There are gardens at Le Conte Elementary School (which has goats and livestock) in Berkeley, the Edible Schoolyard at Martin Luther King Junior High School (which was founded by Alice Waters of Chez Panisse) in Berkeley, and the schoolyard garden in Verde Elementary School in North Richmond (which was started by Mien hill refugees in the 1970s). Similarly, "entrepreneurial gardens" are specifically intended to alleviate poverty and social exclusion in socioeconomically disadvantaged neighborhoods. For example, the Berkeley Youth Alternatives Garden provides educational opportunities to children, as well as financial opportunities for young people from low-income homes. Participants sell the grown Organic produce to local retailers and at the Berkeley Farmers' Market. Crime diversion gardens focus on creating alternatives to the drug and crime economy in the Bay Area and include St. Mary's Youth Farm in San Francisco and the Strong Roots Gardens in Oakland and Berkeley.

The Golden Gate National Parks Conservancy and National Park Service provide a shuttle designed to increase access to various area parks for free or at a low cost, including Muir Woods, the Marin Headlands, and Presidio Park. In addition, the Centennial Shuttle Program offers free shuttle service to local Bay Area National parks for community groups and organizations.

The Conservancy also partners with various other organizations such as Presidio Trust, YMCA, SFUSD, and many others to offer a wide range of community services to low-income families, including financial assistance programs to the various outdoor and park programs in the area parks. Similarly, Crissy Field Summer Camp reserves half of their camp slots for low-income youth, who receive scholarships from half to the full cost of the program. To qualify for the scholarship program, a family needs to have demonstrated need, as shown by participation in programs such as Free/Reduced Lunch, California CalWorks, and CalFresh. These summer programs would normally cost a family $650–$750 per child.

The nonprofit sector has also been a major actor in open space accessibility in the San Francisco Bay Area. Literacy for Environmental Justice (LEJ) is an environmental justice nonprofit based out of San Francisco with an EcoCenter in the Bayview Hunters Point neighborhood that was awarded the EPA's National Achievements in Environmental Justice award in 2010. The EcoCenter is specifically focused in Bayview, a very poor and industrialized area of the city, and seeks to address environmental injustice in Bayview by educating the community on ecological alternatives to industrial development and in native plant landscaping, and providing an area of high-quality green space in which the community can recreate. The Center also provides a destination for school field trips, teacher training sessions, youth programs, and volunteer days.

The North Richmond Shoreline Open Space Alliance is a nonprofit involved in preserving open space for low-income and minority residents of the Bay Area, composed of environmental and social justice, community-based organizations that have committed to preserving the remaining parts of open space along the northern shorelines of Richmond. Through working closely with the East Bay Regional Parks District, the Alliance develops restoration and public access projects and engages with City Council members to preserve the Richmond shoreline for Richmond residents. The Sierra Club has also instituted the Inspiring Connections Outdoors in their Bay Area Chapter, an all-volunteer outreach program that provides wilderness experiences for at-risk neighborhoods, including snow camping with Temescal High School, hiking Angel Island with the Madison Park Academy Adventure Club, and overnight trips to Alice Eastwood Memorial Grove with Oakland International High School.

==== Barriers to equal accessibility ====
The San Francisco Bay Area still faces unequal access to parks and green space. In 1991, the Bay Area Council published a report on growth management, stating the need to protect green spaces in California. This led to slow-growth initiatives, which put moratoriums on city growth within a certain period of time. Slow-growth initiatives, residential lot requirements, and private land trusts have helped individual communities block the development of new, less upscale, housing. However, slow-growth initiatives do not prevent urban sprawl in undeveloped, less regulated areas of the Bay. Because of this lack of regulation of urban sprawl, undeveloped, lower-income neighborhoods in the Bay Area soon faced aggressive urban development, thus decreasing surrounding green spaces. Thus, lower-income Bay Area neighborhoods have much less access to green space than areas that benefitted from slow-growth initiatives. Green space in cities such as San Francisco, San Jose, Vallejo, and Concord are at high risk for being developed by urban planners. Other cities, such as Oakland, Richmond, and San Mateo are almost completely urbanized.

The Comprehensive Environmental Response, Compensation, and Liability Act (CERCLA, or Superfund) began in 1980, and was designed to fund the cleanup of sites contaminated with hazardous waste so that they could be redeveloped and used by the community. Many of these Superfund sites have been earmarked to be used for open space development, community parks, and nature preserves. However, many Superfund sites in the Bay Area, such as areas in Bayview Hunters Point, remain abandoned to this day, deepening economic decline. Because Superfund sites cannot be re-purposed until they are cleaned, their ongoing inattention has destroyed open space, decreasing access to green spaces in much of the Bay Area's low-income neighborhoods. These problems have led to the formation of the San Francisco Brownfields Working Group, which focuses on strengthening dialogue and community leadership around the issues of brownfields and Superfund sites in the Bay Area.

In the city of San Francisco, the District 6 Open Space Task Force noted that the majority of areas needing development of local and state parks were predominantly low-income, minority, urban settings (such as Bryant Street, the Tenderloin District, and Bayview Hunters Point). The San Francisco Parks Alliance made it their mission to "inspire and promote civic engagement and philanthropy to protect, sustain, and enrich San Francisco parks, recreation, and green open spaces." However, there is no outright environmental justice focus in the organization's mission. Additionally, the East Bay Parks System has also acknowledged the inequalities in access to green space in the East Bay. In its most recent self-assessment, the parks system said that its current emphasis on the preservation of large-scale wildlands may continue to perpetuate lack of access to green space for low-income, minority communities in the East Bay.

Urban sprawl in the San Francisco Bay Area occurs because of intense urbanization and increasing demands for housing, leading cities to have trouble supplying these demands to a growing population. Conservationists estimate that around 300,000 acres of land in the Bay Area are at risk of being re-appropriated to cities due to urban sprawl. Currently, there are battles between conservationists and city developers over whether protected land in the Bay Area should be appropriated for housing, or continue to be protected. Scientists and conservationists argue that if land were to be used for housing, it would most negatively affect low-income communities in the Bay Area because these communities are already at a disadvantage when it comes to accessing green space. Reappropriating green space for housing in low-income areas would further increase the difference in access to green space between high-income and low-income areas in the Bay.

Locally, the development of green spaces in the Bay Area is difficult. In Vallejo, the citizens' commission on the city's general plan wanted to make new open space along the city's waterfront, which is located in South Vallejo, the city's poorest neighborhood. However, when the citizens' commission presented their ideas at a meeting, the city attorney said that there was a pending project, and that industrial sites needed to be left as is. The city plans on dredging a shipping channel between Vallejo and Mare Island, as well as building a deep-water port and a cement processing plant. Residents have not only stated that this would have adverse effects on access to green space in South Vallejo, one of the poorest neighborhoods in the Bay Area, but that this would also cause many health problems for South Vallejo residents. City officials vow to continue with the project, and Vallejo residents demand more transparency and self-determination on city projects. In San Francisco, the Bayview Hunters Point neighborhood has traditionally lacked green space, but the Bayview Waterfront Project was created to develop the area for retail, offices, and parks and recreational open space. However, some residents of Bayview have criticized such initiatives and say that, due to increasing gentrification of the area, the open space would not be enjoyed by Bayview's long-term residents and instead would be co-opted by newer, wealthier residents. Gentrification and the diaspora of black residents in the Bayview has increased in recent decades. In 1990, 65% of Bayview residents were African American; by 2000 black people no longer were a majority of residents.

=== San Diego County ===
				Public Access Open Space Area		Total Protected Land Area		Racial Distribution								Income	
County	Population (2010)	Total Area (sq mile)	Population Density	Acres	%	Acres	%	White	African American	Native American	Asian	Pacific Islander	Other Race	Two or More Races	Hispanic or Latino	Per Capita (2011)	Median Household (2011)
San Diego	3,095,313	4,526 sq mi (11,720 km2)	730/sq mi (280/km2)	1,283,395	44.3%	1,353,709	46.7%	1,981,442 (64.0%)	158,213 (5.1%)	26,340 (0.9%)	336,091 (10.9%)	15,337 (0.5%)	419,465 (13.6%)	158,425 (5.0%)	991,348 (32.0%)	$30,955	$63,857

==== Environmental justice initiatives ====
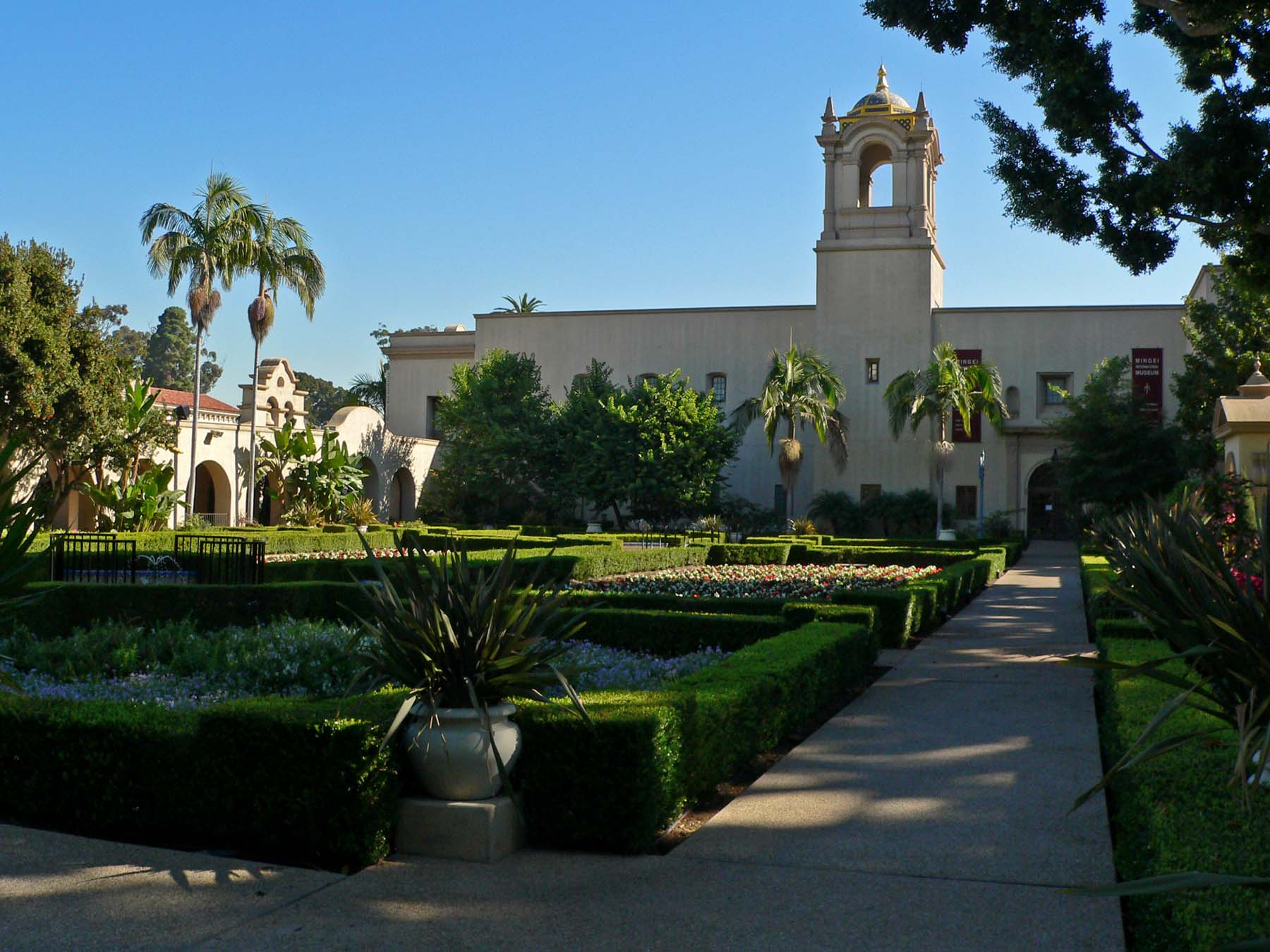
Formal garden in Balboa Park, San Diego.

Balboa Park is a centrally located, expansive urban park available to residents of the City of San Diego through widely available public transportation that serves many communities of different races and classes. It offers botanical gardens, cultural exhibits, a theater, and a zoo. Likewise, Mission Trails Park, a 5,800-acre urban park, is also accessible by public transportation, as is Mission Bay, a 4,000-acre land-and-water-based urban park and a part of SeaWorld.

Located in Panhe, San Onofre State Beach Park is a 3,000 acre nature reserve that is frequently visited for recreation, much of which is available for low costs to benefit low-income visitors. For many years, a proposal to build a toll road through the Park was vehemently opposed by environmentalist and indigenous advocacy groups, particularly by Native American allies and activists because Panhe is home to a sacred burial site. In 2008, the California Coastal Commission voted firmly against the proposal, citing its harmful impact on Native Americans as their primary motive. In 2016, a final agreement was reached between activist groups, the Transportation Corridor Agency, and CA Attorney General Kamala Harris that provided permanent protection to San Onofre State Beach Park.

Chicago Park is located in Barrio Logan, a central, predominately Latino, San Diego city. It has seen significant emigration after years of negative environmental impacts due to industrialization. On the first Earth Day in April 1970, after the City attempted to build a parking lot for the California Highway Patrol where it had promised to create a park, community members protested construction and demanded that the City follow through on its promises. This led to the successful development of Chicano Park, where murals and other forms of art honor Chicano culture and have brought about the designation of the Park as a San Diego Historical Site.

The Otay River Valley region of San Diego, extending from south of the Bay to the US-Mexico border, is disproportionately Latino. In the process is a plan to make a 9,000-acre nature reserve called the Otay Valley Regional Park for public recreation in the area. There are also plans in this proposal to maintain Native American sacred sites. Efforts to distribute materials in residents' primary language, Spanish, have greatly increased public awareness of and involvement in the proposal. However, much of the park will be restricted from public use.

Chollas Creek runs 32 miles through numerous minority-heavy neighborhoods in San Diego and has been extremely polluted because of industrial activities and environmental neglect over the years. The proposed Chollas Creek Enhancement Plan would repair this damage to the waterway's health and create opportunities for the nearby socioeconomically disadvantaged population to recreate. Nonetheless, at the moment, much of the creek remains unprotected from illegal dumping and invasive species intrusion.

In recent years, the San Diego River has been heavily polluted due to illegal dumping activities. There have been proposals by the San Diego River Park Foundation to revive the quality of the river and make recreation possible across the entire 52-mile waterway, through an interconnected system of parks and trails.

==== Barriers to equal accessibility ====
In San Diego, Latinos are often concentrated in the central, southeastern, and far southern areas, whereas Caucasians predominate in western and northern areas. Like many other places in California, these ethnic divides resemble socioeconomic divides, which lead to inequities in park and open space distribution. These inequities then translate into serious health ramifications, particularly complications from being overweight or obese, which disproportionately impacts Blacks (66.2%), Native Americans (59.8%), and Latinos (64.5%) relative to Caucasians (52.2%). This in turn has led to far fewer percentages of Black and Latino children passing state physical fitness tests, at 26.4–27.3% and 20.8–26.4%, respectively, relative to White children, at 40.5–45.2%, from the 5th to 9th grades. These racial differentials in physical fitness have been tied to differentials in park distribution.

San Diego County contains a significant amount of green space, including Cleveland National Forest, Anza-Borrego Desert State Park, and Cyumaca Rancho State Park. However, most of this green space is contained outside of densely packed western portion of the County, within which there exists much variation in accessibility to green space by race and income. For example, northern neighborhoods are significantly closer to Mission Trails Park, which would require several bus stops and take up more time for working-class residents of southern areas. For those that desire to get to green space and do not have it in their own community, extensive planning and cars are often required to access the aforementioned parks in the less densely packed areas of the County.

13 of San Diego's 18 incorporated cities are considered "park poor," meaning they provide fewer than 3 acres of park per 1,000 residents. 3 of the remaining 5 provide just above this, at roughly 3 acres per 1,000 residents. The Cities of San Diego and Encinitas are the only 2 of these 18 cities that offer much more than 3 acres per 1,000 residents: 32.5 and 31, respectively. The City of San Diego has many tourist attractions that increase its open space, such as SeaWorld and the San Diego Zoo. Encinitas is significantly more white than San Diego County on average: 78.8% vs. 48.5%.

San Diego's beaches, like all beaches in California, are public, meaning all citizens can enter without having to show proof of ownership. Nonetheless, 6 of the 8 beach communities in San Diego are significantly (at least 20% more) whiter and wealthier than county averages, and those who live away from the beaches need cars in order to access them. This results in unequal accessibility because many residents of San Diego cannot afford cars. However, both Imperial Beach and Oceanside are disproportionately Latino.

San Diego's mountains and forests, despite presenting a wide array of recreational advantages, are far away from urban centers and cannot be readily accessed through public transportation, making it difficult for residents without cars who are working full-time to access them. They include the Laguna Mountains, Cuyamaca Mountains, and Palomar Mountains, as well as the Cleveland National Forest.
