= Rufous-sided towhee =

Rufous-sided towhee may refer to two different species that were previously considered one species:

- Eastern towhee, Pipilo erythrophthalmus
- Spotted towhee, Pipilo maculatus
