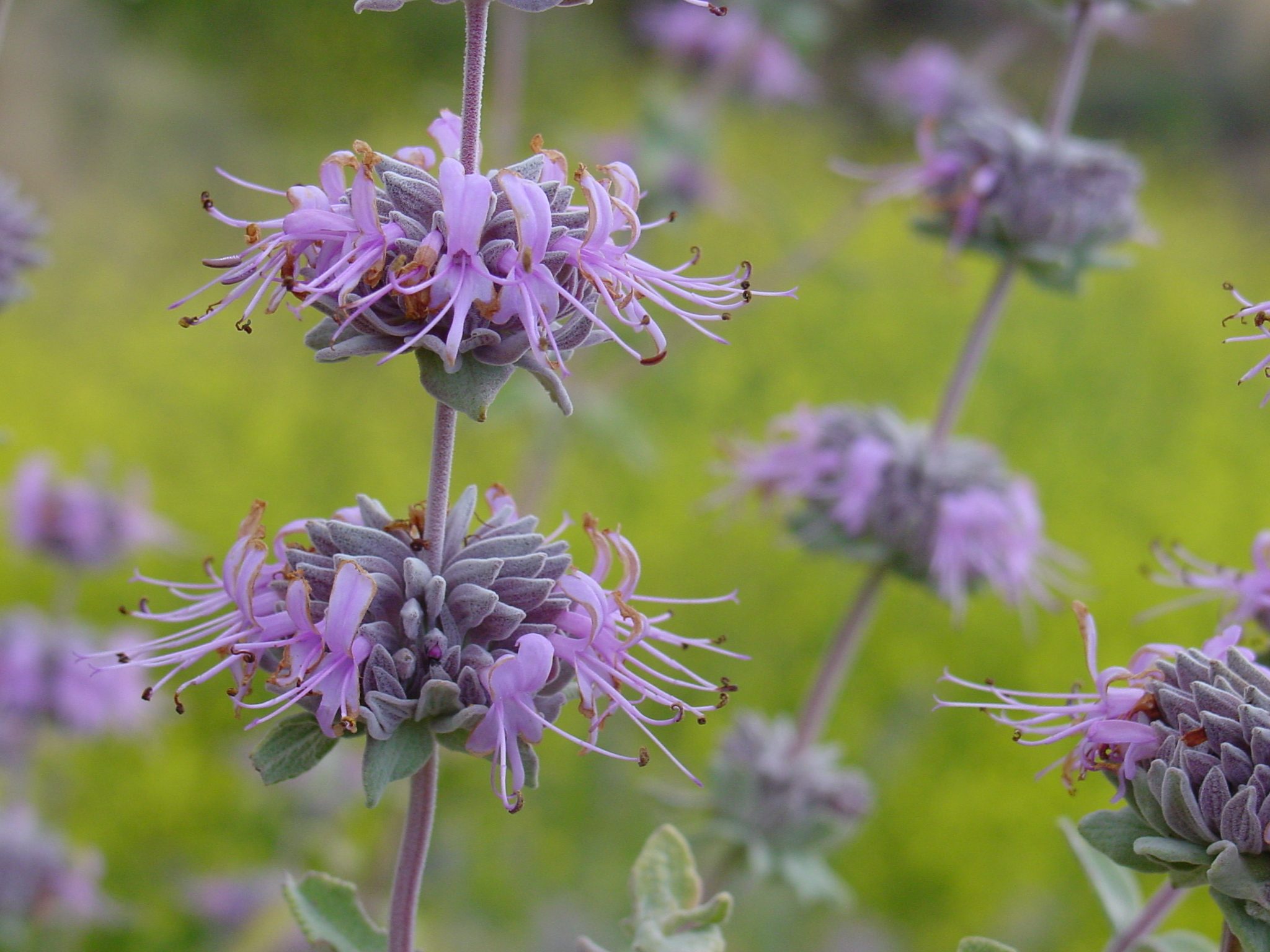
- Purple sage flowers

Scientific classification
- Kingdom: Plantae
- Clade: Tracheophytes
- Clade: Angiosperms
- Clade: Eudicots
- Clade: Asterids
- Order: Lamiales
- Family: Lamiaceae
- Genus: Salvia
- Species: S. leucophylla

Binomial name
- Salvia leucophylla Greene

= Salvia leucophylla =

Species of flowering plant

Salvia leucophylla, the San Luis purple sage or gray sage, is an aromatic sage native to the southern coastal mountain ranges of the Californias.

== Description ==
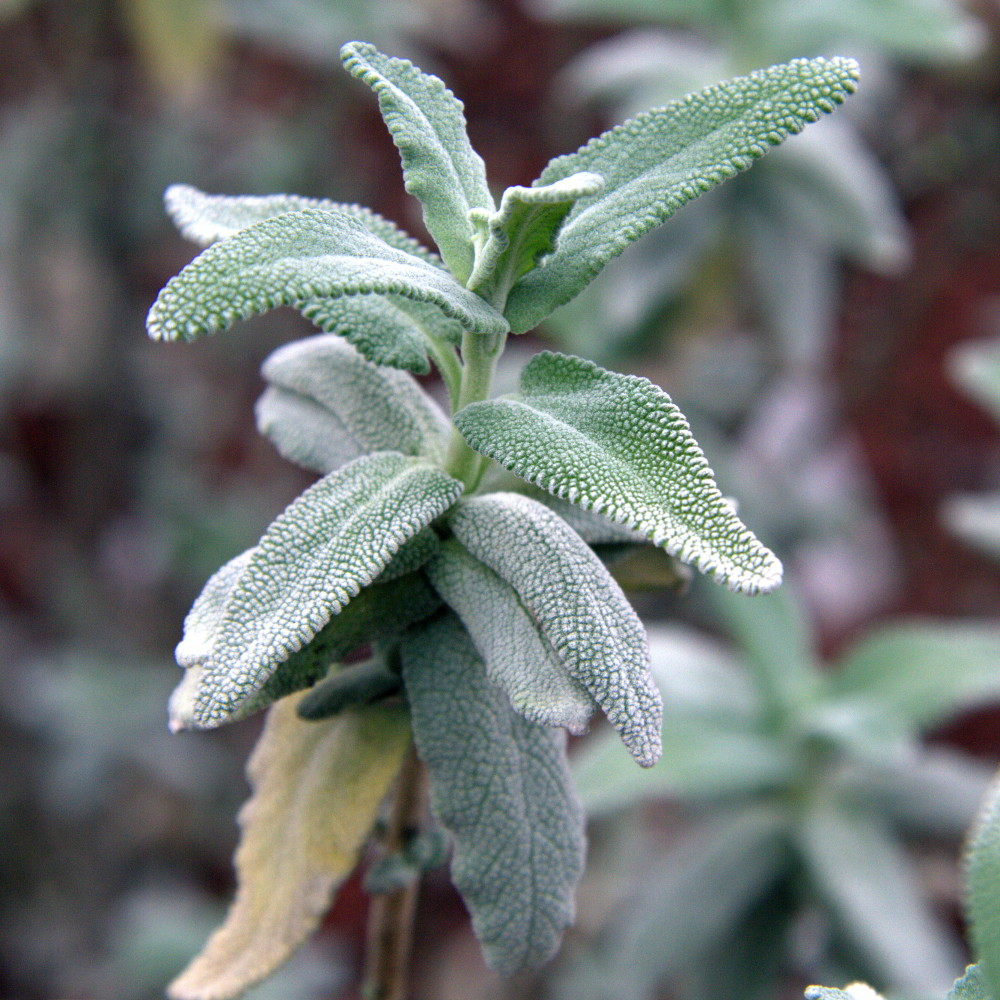
Foliage

S. leucophylla is an evergreen shrub that grows up to 1 to 1.5 metres (3 1/2 to 5 feet) tall and wide. The leaves are a light green in the spring, turning grayish-white as they mature, with graceful branches that arch to the ground, sometimes rooting when they touch the ground. Flowers grow in tight whorls on 15 to 20 centimetres (6 to 8 inches) long inflorescences, with a pinkish-purple flowering stem. The 2.5 cm (1 in) flowers are pinkish-purple, held in a purple-tinged gray calyx.

== Taxonomy ==
The plant's specific epithet, leucophylla, describes the light grayish leaves. The type specimen was collected near Santa Barbara, California, by Scottish botanist David Douglas and named by Edward Lee Greene in 1892. The common names refer to the pale purple flowers (purple sage) or to the grayish leaves (gray sage).

== Distribution and habitat ==
The plant is native to the southern coastal mountain ranges of California and Baja California, typically being found on dry hillsides and in gravelly soils.

== Cultivation ==
The species is widely used in California and xeriscape gardening, preferring full sun and good drainage. There are many cultivars, natural hybrids, and wild hybrids with other Salvia species, making clear naming very confusing.

Some cultivars include:

- Salvia leucophylla 'Pt. Sal'
- Salvia leucophylla 'Figueroa'
- Salvia leucophylla 'Bee's Bliss'

Salvia leucophylla is known to have allelopathic qualities. It is thought that monoterpenoids released from the plant may be responsible for inhibiting the growth of neighboring seedlings.
