= America's Great Outdoors Initiative =

U.S government program

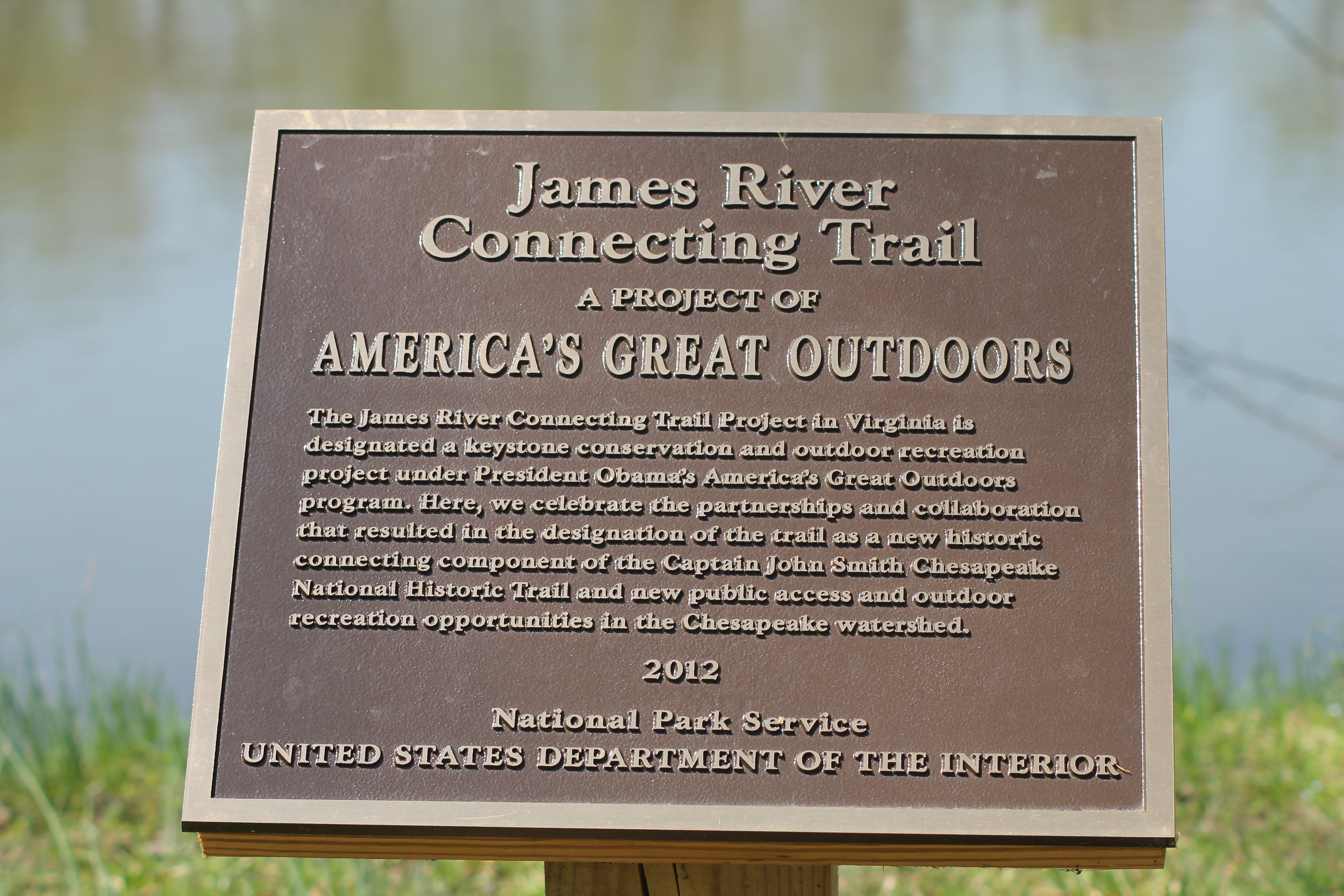
Plaque denoting the use of the Initiative to create a trail at Powhatan State Park in Virginia

The America's Great Outdoors Initiative (AGO) is a program of the Obama Administration, announced on April 16, 2010. It is designed to preserve a number of notable natural features in the American landscape. It is also designed to protect key natural resources and natural features for future generations to enjoy. It is managed by the Bureau of Land Management, an agency within the Department of the Interior.

== Purpose ==
The presidential memorandum calls for support from "private industry, local communities, Native American leaders and volunteers", while the text of the memorandum of the text itself specifies coordination with the following federal agencies.

- United States Department of Defense
- United States Department of Commerce
- United States Department of Housing and Urban Development
- United States Department of Health and Human Services
- United States Department of Labor
- United States Department of Transportation
- United States Department of Education
- Office of Management and Budget

The initiative is not funded, with the 2011 report citing "fiscal constraints facing the federal government." At the time of the announcement, the National Park Service required an estimated $9.5B backlog in unfulfilled repair and improvement projects.

== Reports ==
At the outset of the initiative, an initial research report detailing possible initiatives was delivered. Annual progress reports were delivered in 2011 and 2012, with no subsequent reports.

== See also ==
- Environmentalism
- Environmental policy of the United States
