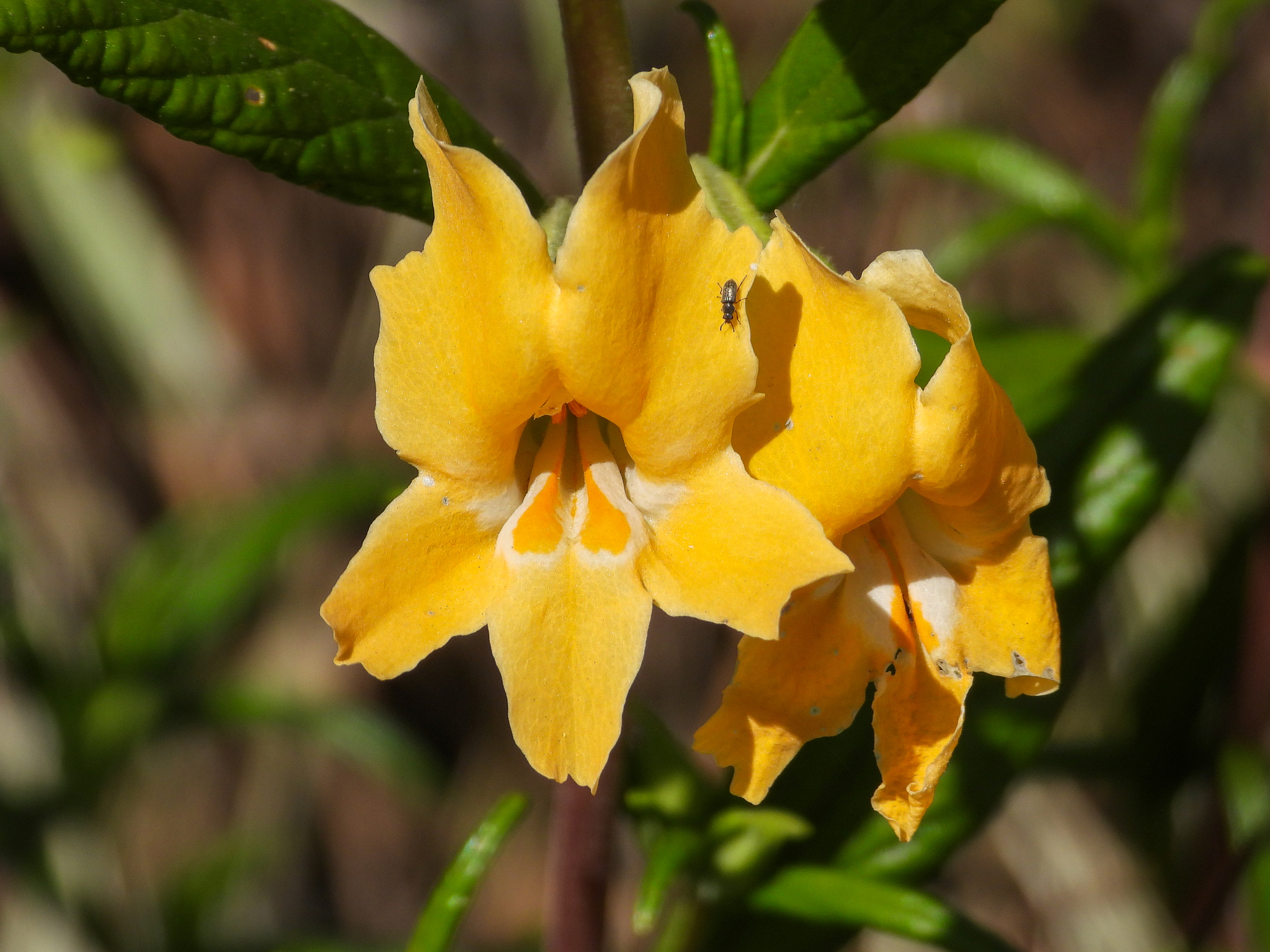

Conservation status
- Unranked (NatureServe)

Scientific classification
- Kingdom: Plantae
- Clade: Embryophytes
- Clade: Tracheophytes
- Clade: Angiosperms
- Clade: Eudicots
- Clade: Asterids
- Order: Lamiales
- Family: Phrymaceae
- Genus: Diplacus
- Species: D. longiflorus

Binomial name
- Diplacus longiflorus Nutt.

Synonyms
- Diplacus arachnoideus Greene; Diplacus aurantiacus var. longiflorus (Nutt.) D.J.Keil; Diplacus glutinosus var. pubescens Torr.; Diplacus speciosus Burtt Davy; Mimulus aurantiacus var. pubescens (Torr.) D.M.Thomps.; Mimulus glutinosus var. brachypus A.Gray; Mimulus longiflorus (Nutt.) A.L.Grant ex L.H.Bailey

= Diplacus longiflorus =

Southern bush monkeyflower

Species of flowering plant

Diplacus longiflorus (syn. Mimulus longiflorus), commonly known as southern bush monkeyflower, is a species of monkeyflower native to southwestern California (United States) and Baja California Norte (Mexico). It is a subshrub or shrub native to the South Coast Ranges, Central Coast, Transverse Ranges, Peninsular Ranges, Mojave Desert ranges, and the Southern California coastal plain, and to Santa Cruz and Santa Rosa islands. It grows on well-drained and exposed sites, and in boulder and rock outcrop crevices in desert areas, from sea level to 2,440 meters elevation.
