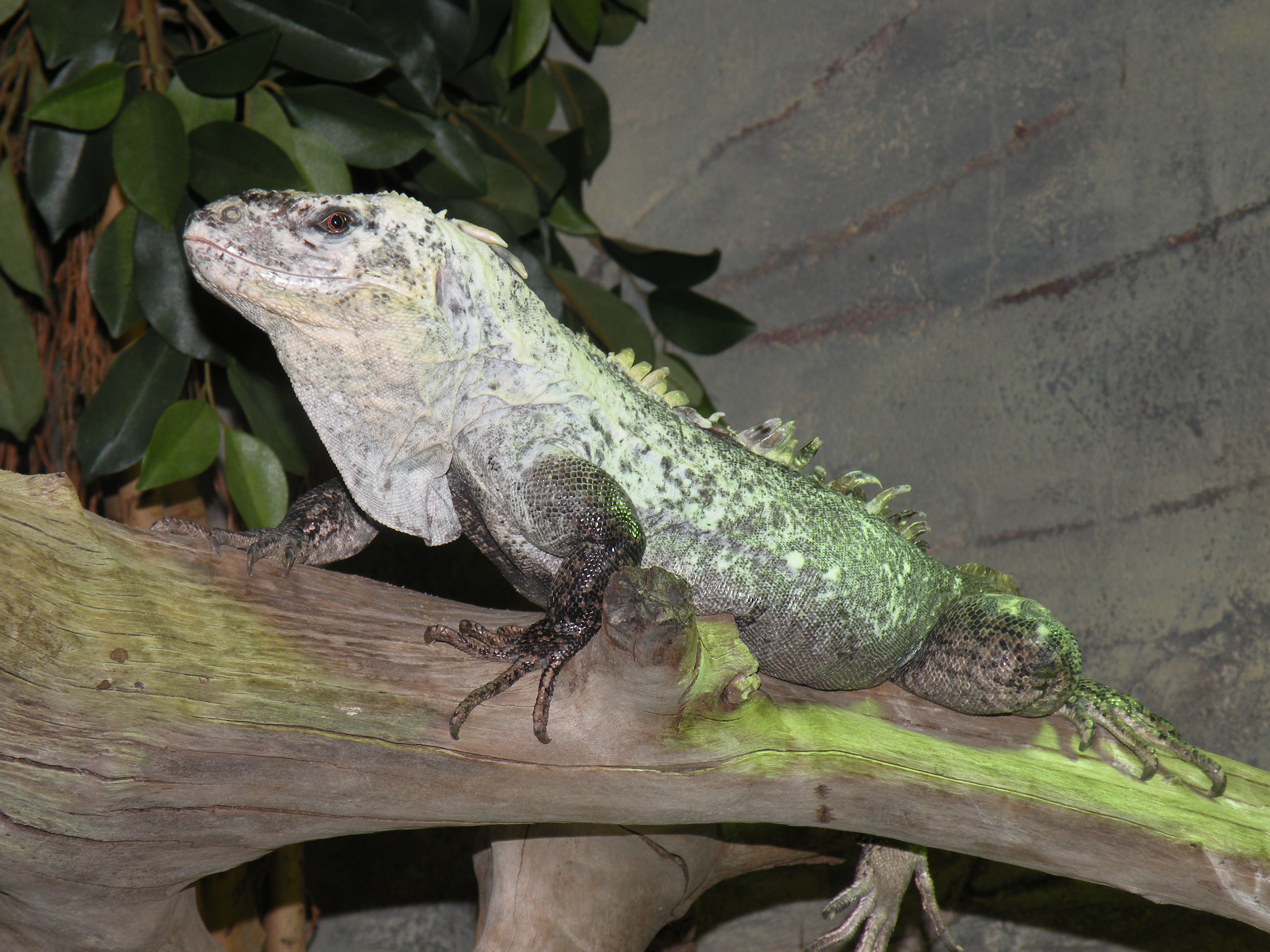

Conservation status
- Critically Endangered (IUCN 3.1)
- CITES Appendix II

Scientific classification
- Kingdom: Animalia
- Phylum: Chordata
- Class: Reptilia
- Order: Squamata
- Suborder: Iguania
- Family: Iguanidae
- Genus: Ctenosaura
- Species: C. bakeri

Binomial name
- Ctenosaura bakeri Stejneger, 1901
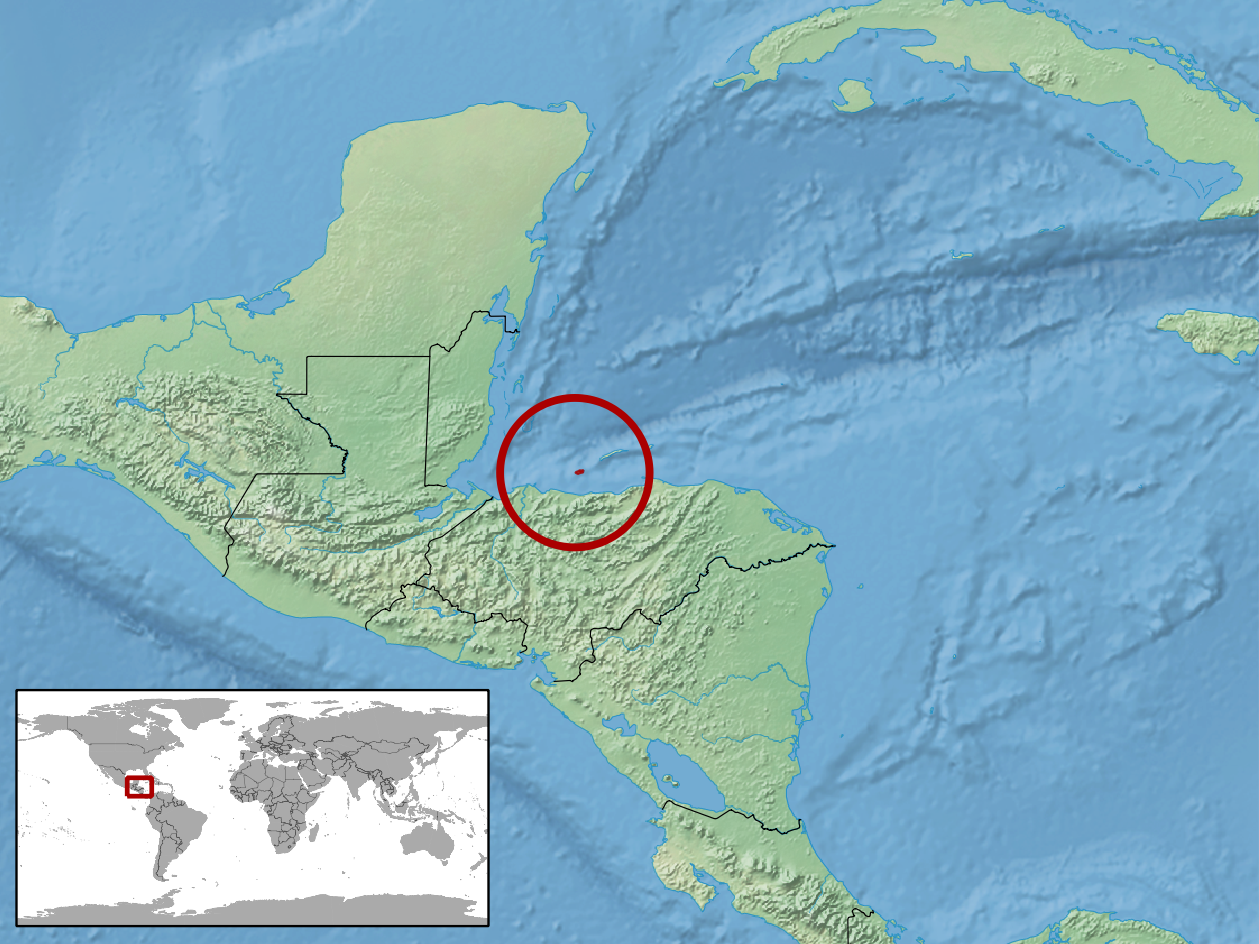

Synonyms
- Ctenosaura bakeri Stejneger, 1901; Enyaliosaurus bakeri — J. Meyer & Wilson, 1973; Ctenosaura bakeri — Wilson & Hahn, 1973; Ctenosaura (Loganiosaura) bakeri — G. Köhler et al., 2000

= Ctenosaura bakeri =

Species of lizard

Ctenosaura bakeri, also known as the Utila spiny-tailed iguana, Baker's spinytail iguana, swamper or wishiwilly del suampo, is a critically endangered species of spinytail iguana endemic to the island of Utila, one of the Islas de la Bahía off the coast of Honduras in the Caribbean.

The Utila iguana is the only species of iguana and one of only two species of lizard to exclusively inhabit brackish mangrove swamps, forced there due to competition from larger species. It is the smallest of the three species of iguana found on Utila, and unique among spiny-tailed iguanas as it is born a dark color as opposed to bright green or yellow. It is arboreal and primarily herbivorous, although it can be an opportunistic carnivore. Males may grow up to 76 centimeters (30 in) in length, while females are smaller, with a length of up to 56 centimeters (22 in). Eggs are laid in sandy beaches and hatch about 60–76 days later, with the hatchlings returning to live in the mangrove forests.

Brought to the brink of extinction by the 1990s due to hunting, it was brought back to international attention by German herpetologist Dr. Gunther Köhler and his book Reptiles of Central America. Although several zoos and wildlife associations have instituted programs for the iguanas on Utila, the species still finds itself threatened due to overhunting and may face more of a threat in the form of habitat loss. Extreme conservation efforts are in place to try to prevent this species from going extinct.

== Taxonomy ==
Ctenosaura bakeri was first described by Norwegian-born American zoologist Leonhard Stejneger in 1901, while working for the Smithsonian Institution. The generic name, Ctenosaura, is derived from two Greek words: ctenos (Κτενός), meaning "comb" (referring to the comblike spines on the lizard's back and tail), and saura (σαύρα), meaning "lizard". Its specific name, bakeri, is the Latinized form of Stejneger's friend and colleague Frank Baker, who was a former director of the National Zoo in Washington, D.C.

The species is believed to have evolved from mainland-based ancestors, and may share ancestors with C. melanosterna and C. palearis, as it is phylogenetically closer to these two than it is to C. similis. Access to Utila may have involved over-water dispersal during hurricanes, as is known for Iguana iguana in the Lesser Antilles or a land bridge to the mainland lost during the close of the last ice age.

== Distribution and habitat ==
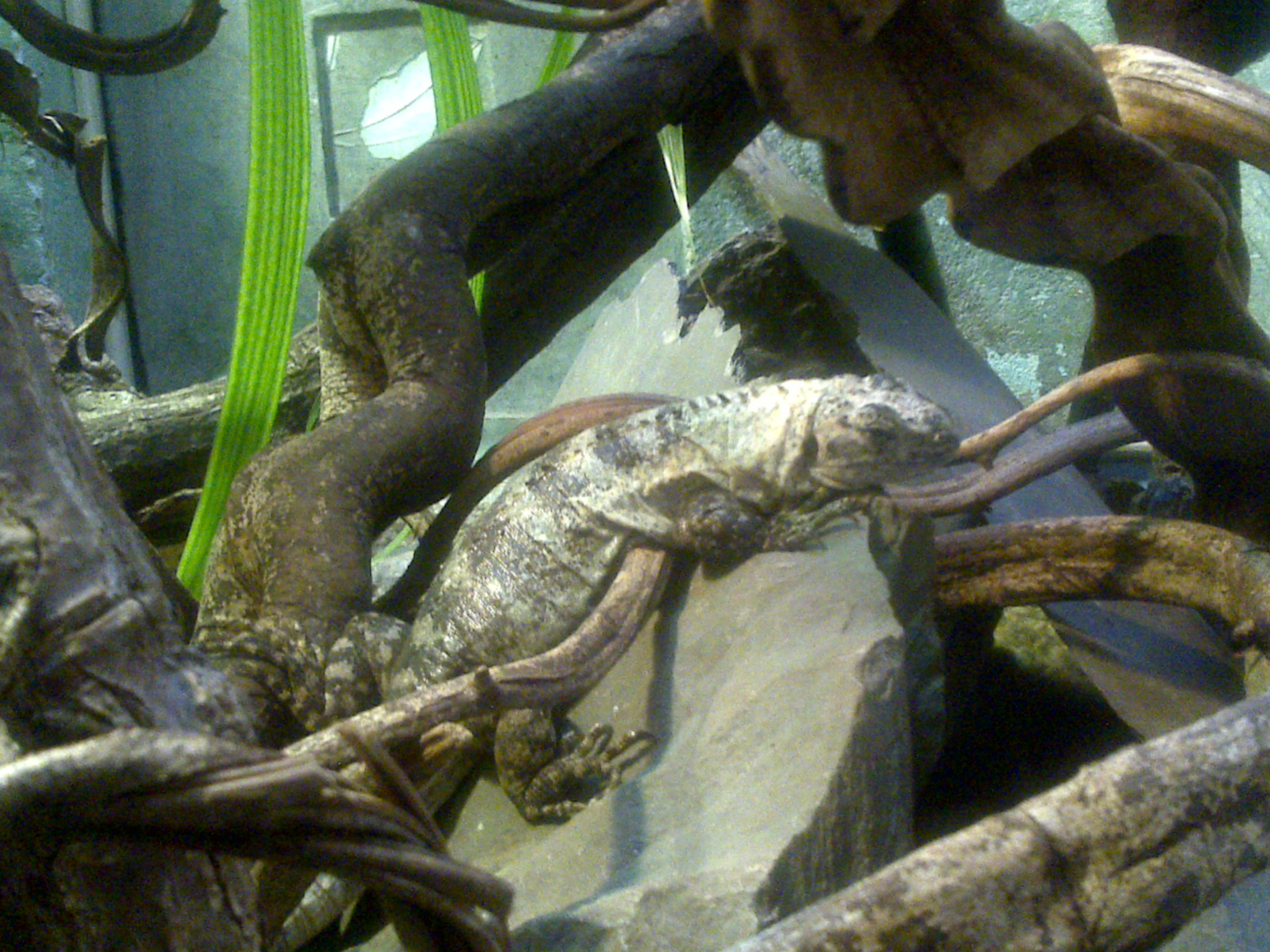
Utila spiny-tailed iguana, in the London Zoo

Endemic to Utila, an island off the northern Honduras coast, Ctenosaura bakeri is an inhabitant of 8 square kilometres (3.1 sq mi) of mangrove forests. Unique among iguanids and rare among reptiles, it is believed that C. bakeri was pushed into the mangrove swamps due to competition from the larger, more aggressive C. similis, which typically inhabits the drier habitats on Utila. It has interbred with this very species and produced viable offspring. From evolutionary and ecological perspectives, inhabiting brackish mangrove forests entails very specific adaptations of diet, behavior, and resource utilization. It is one of only two known species of lizard, the other being a species of anole, Anolis utilensis, that lives solely in mangrove forests.

== Description ==
The Utila iguana has a grey-brown to black coloring when young, the only species of spiny-tail iguana with such a dark color when young. Other members of the genus have a green or yellow coloring when young and turn darker with age. As this animal matures it can be a blue or light gray in color, depending on heat conditions or even the animal's temper.

Males achieve a maximum total length (including tail) of 76 centimeters (30 in), while females are typically 30% smaller at 56 centimeters (22 in) total length. Males have a small dewlap and a dorsal crest made up of 56 large dorsal spines, making the animal sexually dimorphic. This dorsal crest consists of white and black spines arranged in alternating groups of two or three of the same color.

=== Diet ===
Like most iguanids, Ctenosaura bakeri is primarily herbivorous, eating flowers, leaves, stems, and fruit, but they will opportunistically eat smaller animals, eggs, and arthropods that inhabit the mangroves. It has been observed eating smaller green iguanas (Iguana iguana) and geckos such as Hemidactylus frenatus.

=== Reproduction ===
Adults make their homes within holes in various mangrove trees and maintain an arboreal existence whereas the young are strictly terrestrial for the first year of their lives. As the Utila iguana cannot successfully lay its eggs in the mangrove swamps, the gravid females are forced to migrate to nearby sandy beaches in order to bury their clutches of eggs so they can incubate in the hot sun. After digging their nest burrows and laying their eggs, the females abandon the nests and return to the mangroves. Sixty to seventy-four days later the hatchlings emerge and move back to the swamps.

The hatchlings are 15 centimeters (5.9 in) long, the body length being a mere 3 centimeters (1.2 in) with the tail accounting for 12 centimeters (4.7 in) of its total length. The hatchlings' dark skin color enables them to blend in with the dark floor of the mangrove forests to help elude predators.

== Conservation status ==
Gunther Köhler found the species at the brink of extinction, perhaps even functionally extinct in the wild as of 1994 due to overhunting and its restricted habitat. As a result, the Iguana Research and Breeding Station was built in April 1997 with the help and funds of various organizations such as the Frankfurt Zoological Society, the Senckenberg Nature Research Society, AFE-COHDEFOR (State Forestry Administration-Honduran Forestry Development Corporation), BICA (Bay Islands Conservation Association) and the National Autonomous University of Honduras.

This species currently has an estimated wild population of 10,000 animals in 2–3 subpopulations, but is greatly threatened by loss of habitat, as mangrove forests are being used as garbage dump sites and deforested for the construction of homes, resorts, and marinas. Beach habitat is being lost as natural vegetation is removed in preparation for hotel and road construction. According to a survey conducted by the IUCN, exotic invasive plants cover the ground near the mangroves and make the area inappropriate for nesting sites. The iguana is locally hunted for meat, although efforts to educate locals have helped reduce this somewhat in recent years.

In 2004, as a result of Köhler's expedition and subsequent book, Reptiles of Central America, the Conservation Project of the Utila Iguana (CPUI) was founded. The International Iguana Society and the CPUI have sought to purchase land to preserve habitats for the iguanas and plan to establish an outpost staffed by Iguana Research and Breeding station personnel, who will aid in monitoring the property and work with developers to select building sites that preserve as much undisturbed beach area as possible.

The Iguana Research and Breeding station employs a "head-starting" program for newly hatched iguanas. "Head-starting", originally used to protect hatching sea turtles, is a process by which iguana eggs are hatched in an incubator and the animals are protected and fed until they are large enough to be protected from predation upon them. In the case of the Utila iguana, 50% of the animals hatched at the Center are maintained for the head-start program and the rest are released into mangrove forests after hatching. The purpose is to get the animals to a size where they are more capable of fleeing from or fighting off predators. The program has proven successful, as the iguanas behave like their wild-born counterparts. The success of the Utila program serves as a blueprint for other such programs in the Caribbean, particularly with Cyclura species such as the Cuban iguana and blue iguana.

=== Zoological institutions ===
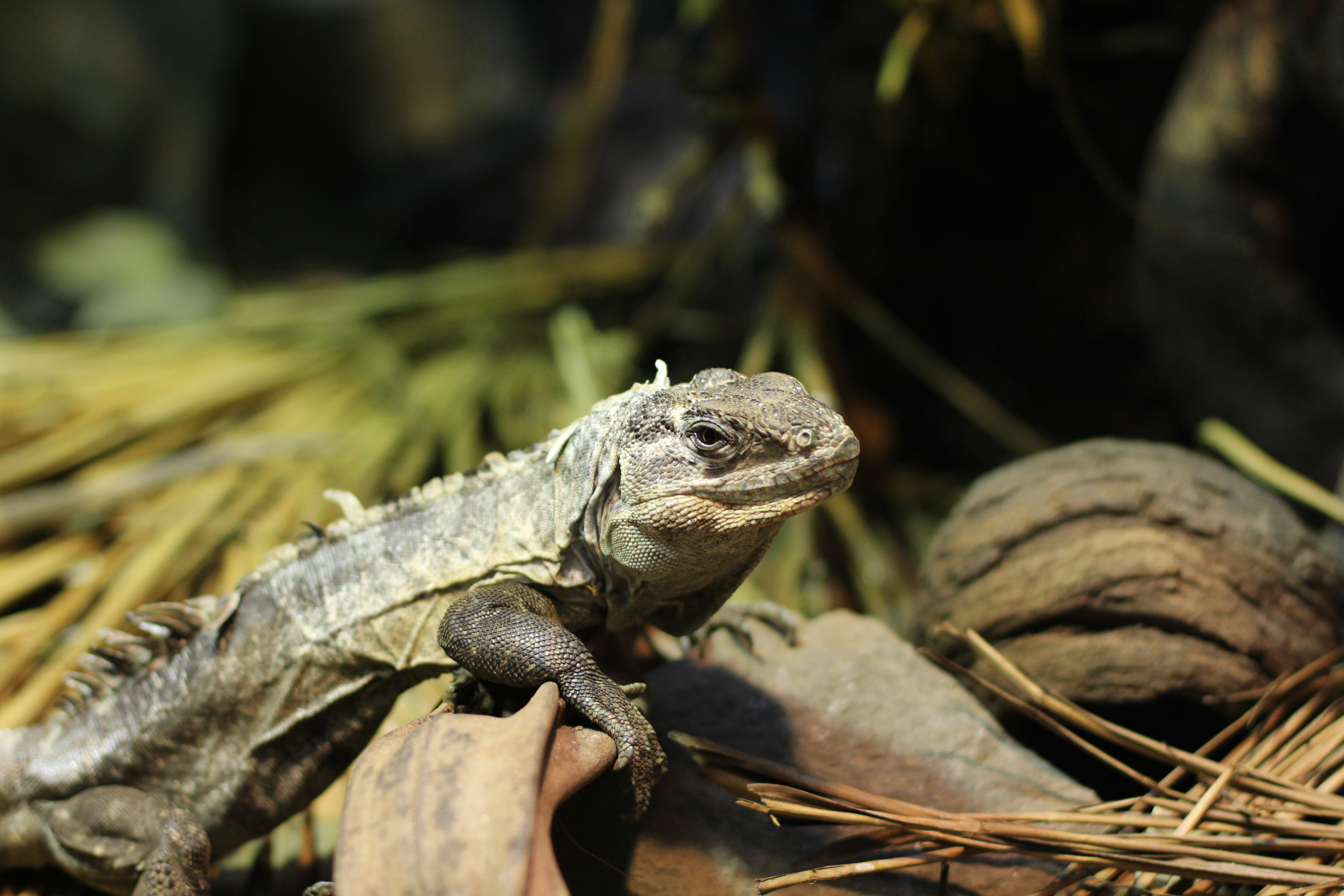
In the London Zoo

The Utila iguana is maintained in a number of zoos throughout Europe, as well as two in the United States (Fresno Chaffee Zoo and the Fort Worth Zoo), each institution serving as an ex-situ breeding center. In September, 2007, the London Zoo successfully managed to breed Ctenosaura bakeri for the first time outside of Utila, an important step to ensure their survival if the species is lost from its natural habitat by hurricanes or over-hunting. The population is currently stable, but future declines are expected as a result of the threats mentioned above.

According to the International Species Information System, the following zoological parks maintain Ctenosaura bakeri in their exhibits.

Institution	Male(s)	Female(s)	Unknown	Born in the last year
Barcelona Zoo	0	0	2	0
Blackpool Zoo	1	1	0	0
Cotswold Wildlife Park	0	0	1	0
Chester Zoo	1	1	0	0
Zoo d'Amnéville	1	0	0	0
Durrell Wildlife Park	1	2	3	0
London Zoo	1	1	3	3
Paignton Zoo	0	0	1	0
Płock Zoo	1	0	2	4
Rotterdam Zoo	2	3	0	0
Museum of Natural History of Tournai	1	0	0	0
Whipsnade Zoo	1	2	13	13
European Subtotal	10	10	24	20
Fort Worth Zoo	4	1	2	0
Fresno Chaffee Zoo	0	1	2	0
US Subtotal	4	2	4	0
Totals	14	12	28	20
