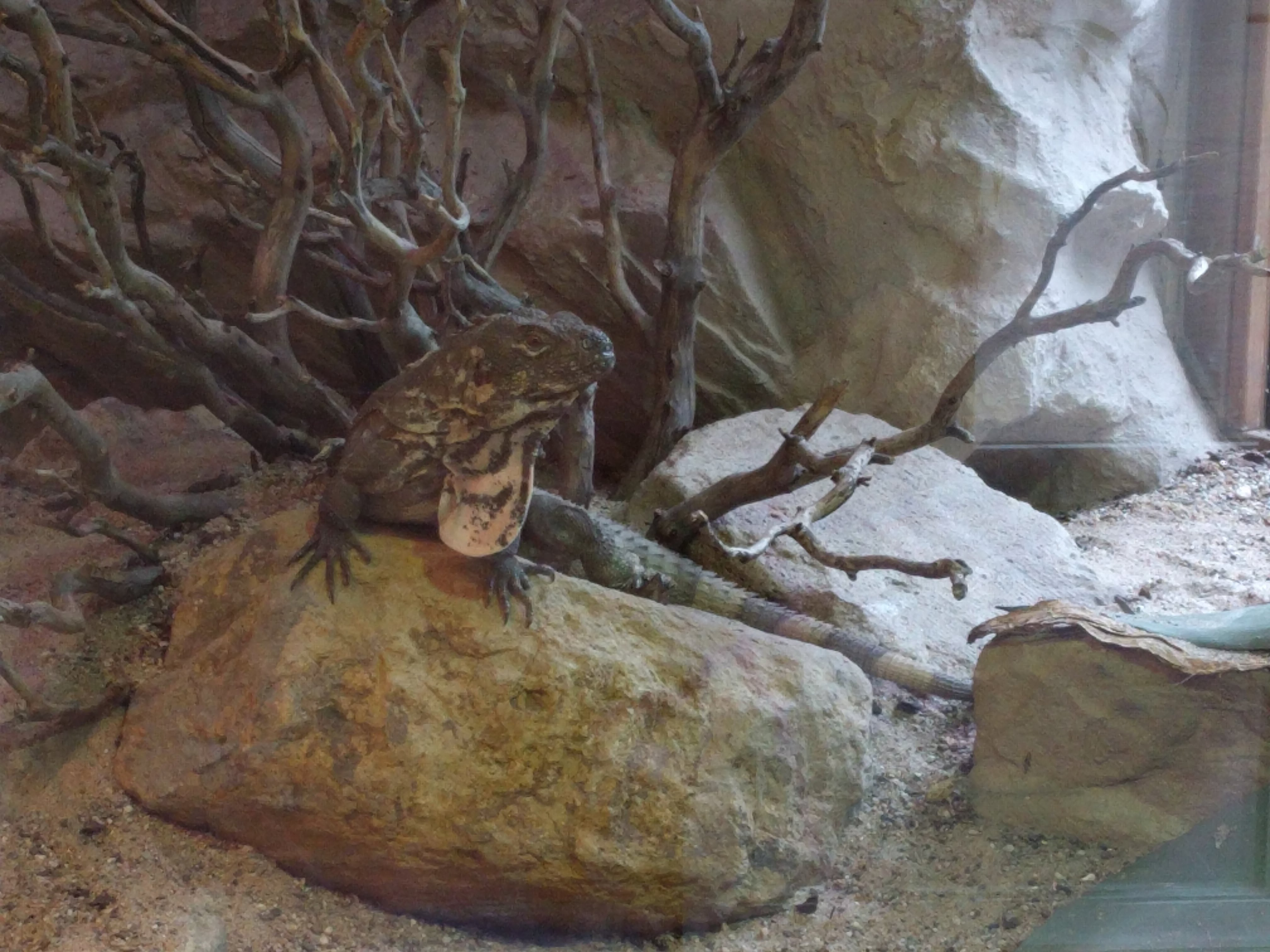

Conservation status
- Least Concern (IUCN 3.1)
- CITES Appendix II (CITES)

Scientific classification
- Kingdom: Animalia
- Phylum: Chordata
- Class: Reptilia
- Order: Squamata
- Suborder: Iguania
- Family: Iguanidae
- Genus: Ctenosaura
- Species: C. macrolopha

Binomial name
- Ctenosaura macrolopha Smith, 1972

= Ctenosaura macrolopha =

Species of lizard

Ctenosaura macrolopha, the Sonoran spiny-tailed iguana, is a species of iguana native to Mexico.

== Description ==
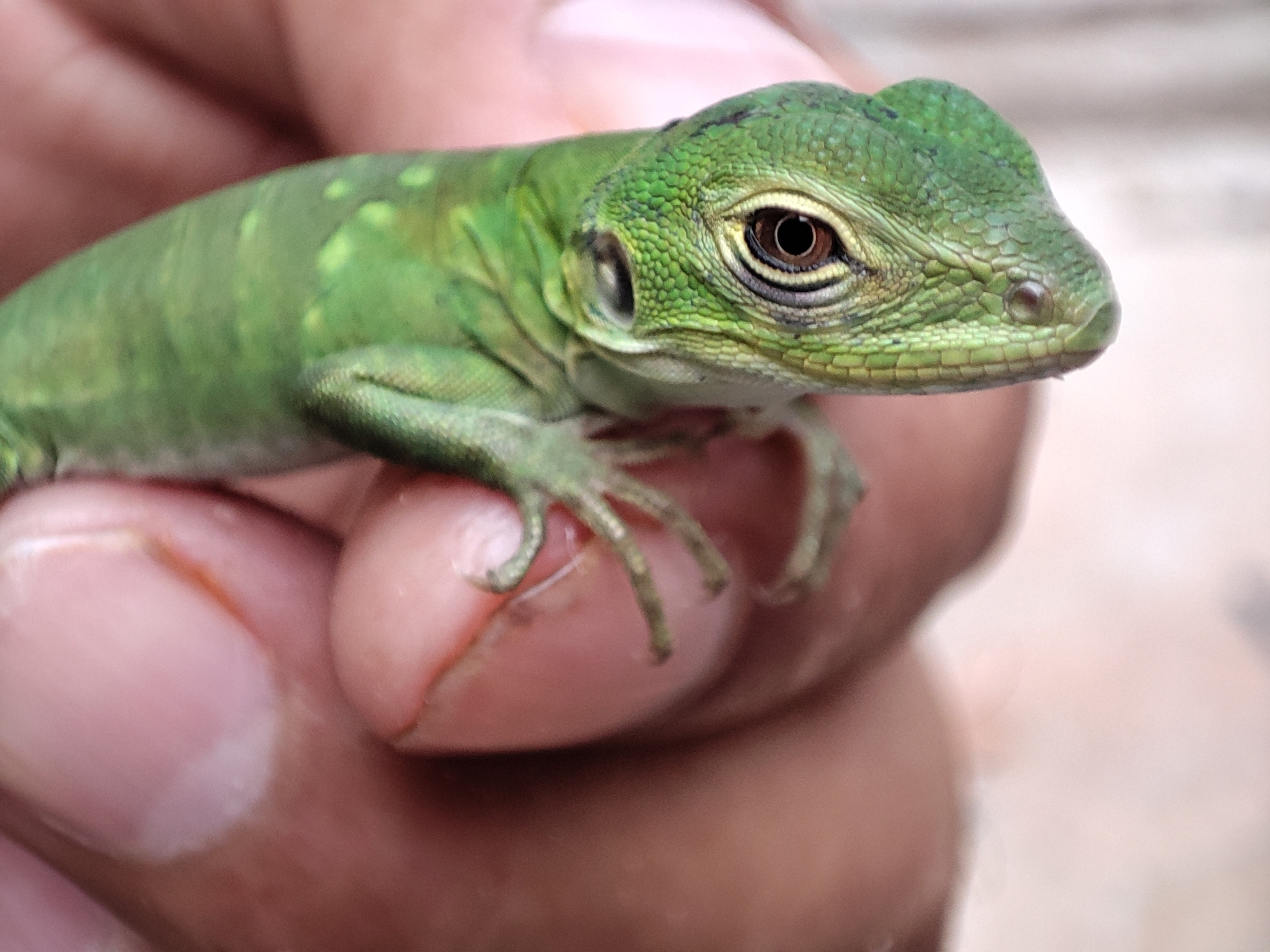
juvenile Sonoran spiny-tailed iguana

adult Sonoran spiny-tailed Iguanas have generally grey and black scales with stripes and banding, especially along the tail, but possess bright green scales as a juvenile. individuals range in size from 12.5 cm (4.9 in) to well over 1 m (39 in)

== Distribution and habitat ==
Sonoran spiny-tailed iguanas are endemic to the Sonoran desert of southwestern North america, native primarily to the Mexican states of Sonora, Sinaloa, and parts of Chihuahua.

there is a large population of hybrid Ctenosaura macrolopha x conspicuosa on the grounds of the Arizona-Sonora Desert Museum in Tucson, arizona.
