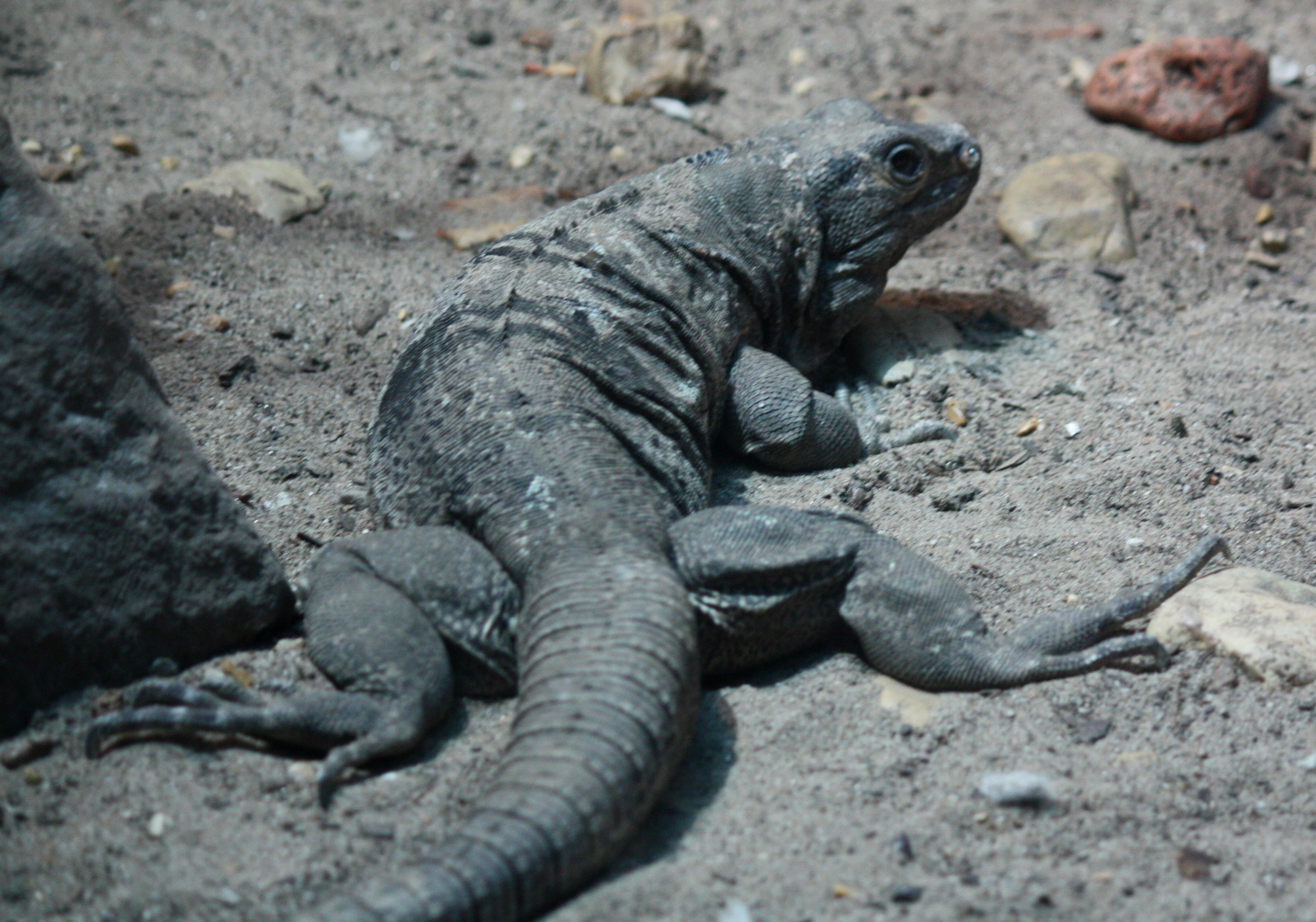

Conservation status
- Least Concern (IUCN 3.1)
- CITES Appendix II

Scientific classification
- Kingdom: Animalia
- Phylum: Chordata
- Class: Reptilia
- Order: Squamata
- Suborder: Iguania
- Family: Iguanidae
- Genus: Ctenosaura
- Species: C. hemilopha

Binomial name
- Ctenosaura hemilopha (Cope, 1863)

Synonyms
- Cyclura (Ctenosaura) hemilopha Cope, 1863; Ctenosaura hemilopha – Cope, 1866; Ctenosaura insulana Dickerson, 1919; Ctenosaura (Ctenosaura) hemilopha – Köhler et al., 200

= Ctenosaura hemilopha =

Species of lizard

Ctenosaura hemilopha, also known as the Cape spiny-tailed iguana or Baja California spiny-tailed iguana, is a species of spinytail iguana endemic to Baja California. It is arboreal and primarily herbivorous, although it can be an opportunistic carnivore. Males may grow up to 100 centimeters (39 in) in length, while females are smaller, with a length of up to 70 centimeters (28 in). Five subspecies are currently recognized.

The existence of mainland and insular populations of this species has been valuable in providing biologists with study and control groups comparing the evolution of island populations and their mainland counterparts. The San Esteban Island subspecies (C.h. conspicuosa) coexists with the giant San Esteban chuckwalla, contrary to predictions of ecological niche theory.

== Taxonomy and etymology ==
Ctenosaura hemilopha was first described by zoologist Edward Drinker Cope in 1863. The generic name, Ctenosaura, is derived from two Greek words: ctenos (Κτενός), meaning "comb" (referring to the comblike spines on the lizard's back and tail), and saura (σαύρα), meaning "lizard". Its specific name is a combination of the Greek word hemisus (ήμισυς) meaning "half" and lophos (λοφος) meaning "crest" or "plume"; both are in reference to the animal's short crest of spines, when compared to other species of its genus.

There are five subspecies of C. hemilopha that are all similar in appearance and habitat.

- C. h. hemilopha occurs on the southern half of the Baja California peninsula, Mexico.
- C. h. conspicuosa is found on San Esteban Island (Isla San Esteban) and Cholludo Island (Isla Cholludo) in the Gulf of California.
- C. h. insulana is found on Cerralvo Island (Isla Cerralvo) 5 miles off the southern part of Baja near La Paz, Baja California Sur.
- C. h. macrolopha is found on the Mexican mainland from Hermosillo, Sonora, south to mid Sinaloa.
- C. h. nolascensis is found on San Pedro Nolasco Island (Isla San Pedro Nolasco).

== Distribution and habitat ==
It is believed that these iguanas may have ended up on the Baja peninsula and the islands because early Seri Indian inhabitants transported them there from the mainland as a food source thousands of years ago. This theory is based on the fact that the coastal distribution on the mainland ends 115 km south of Isla San Esteban. Contrary to predictions from ecological niche theory, the species coexists with the giant San Esteban chuckwalla on San Esteban Island. The two species forage for the same plants in the same habitat at the same time of day during the same season, with neither species displacing the other.

The cape spinytail iguana makes its den in old woodpecker nests in giant columnar cacti and in other tree cavities. The most important factors determining the choice of cactus are the existence of other holes and the cactus height, because these types of refuges allow the lizards to feed and bask on the tree, minimizing the risk of predation.

The existence of mainland and insular populations of this species has been valuable in providing biologists with study and control groups comparing the evolution of island populations.

== Description ==
The cape spinytail iguana has a green or yellow coloring when young and turns whitish gray with age. As this animal matures it can be white or light gray in color with black chevrons, depending on heat conditions or even the animal's temper.

Males achieve a maximum length of 100 centimeters (39 in), while females are typically 30% smaller at 70 centimeters (28 in). Males develop large jowls and a dorsal crest made up of larger dorsal spines, making the animal sexually dimorphic.

=== Diet ===
Like most iguanids, the cape spinytail iguana is primarily herbivorous, eating flowers, leaves, stems, fruit, and cactus, such as the bushy Jatropha cuneata and the taller, spindly Solanum hindsianum. They will opportunistically eat smaller animals, eggs, and arthropods.
