= Fledgling =

Fledgling or Fledglings may refer to:

== Animals ==
- Fledgling (bird), a young bird that has recently left its nest but remains parentally dependent

== Literature ==
- Fledgling (Butler novel), a 2005 vampire novel by Octavia E. Butler
- Fledgling, a 2009 Liaden universe novel by Sharon Lee and Steve Miller
- Fledgling, a 2022 nature memoir by Hannah Bourne-Taylor of her adoption of a fledgling finch
- The Fledgling, a 1980 children's novel written and illustrated by Jane Langton

== Other uses ==
- Curtiss Fledgling, an American model of military trainer aircraft
- Fergie's Fledglings, a group of Manchester United football players

== See also ==
- Fledg'ling Records
