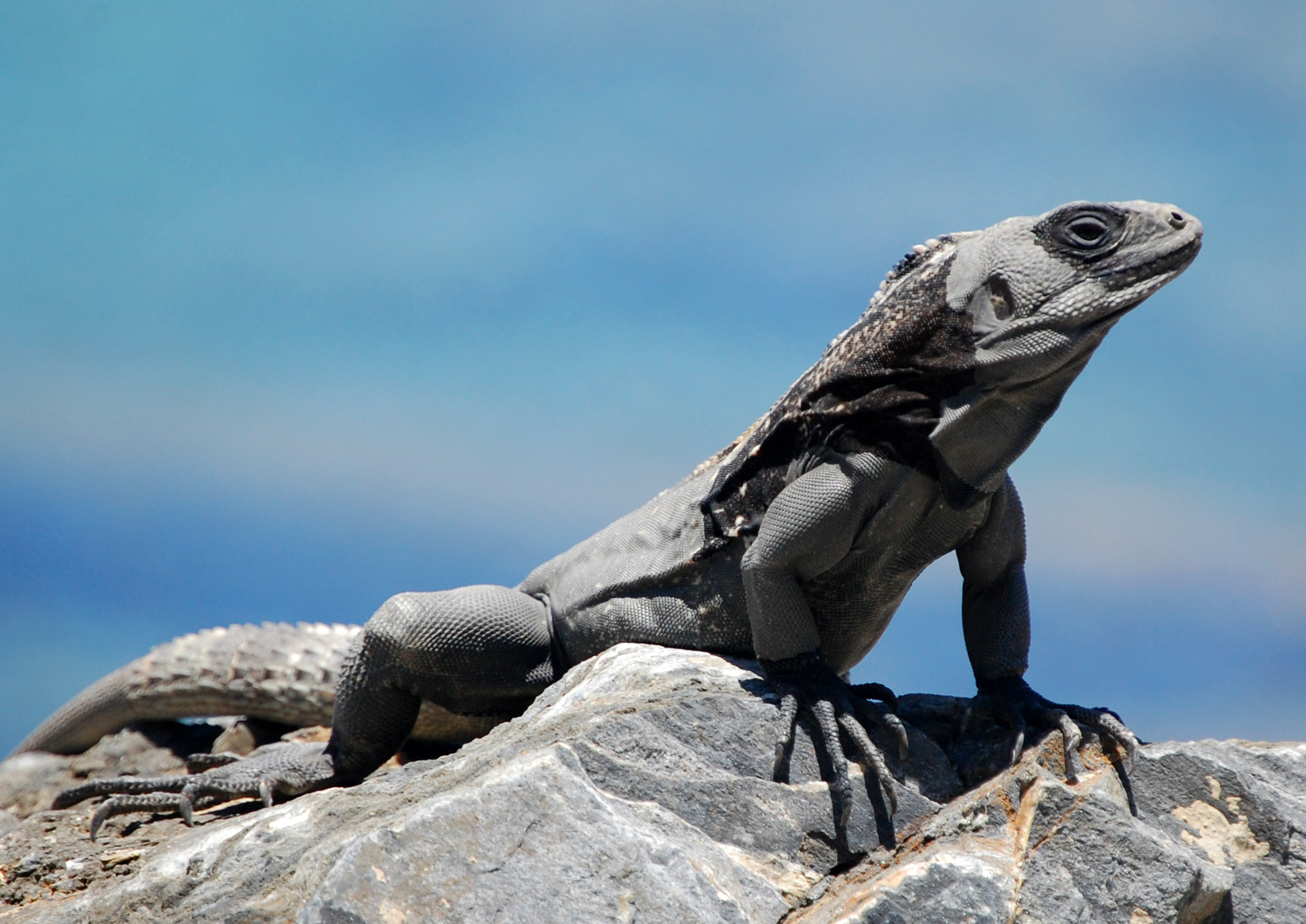
- Black-chested spiny-tailed iguana

Conservation status
- Endangered (IUCN 3.1)
- CITES Appendix II

Scientific classification
- Kingdom: Animalia
- Phylum: Chordata
- Class: Reptilia
- Order: Squamata
- Suborder: Iguania
- Family: Iguanidae
- Genus: Ctenosaura
- Species: C. melanosterna

Binomial name
- Ctenosaura melanosterna Buckley & Axtell, 1997
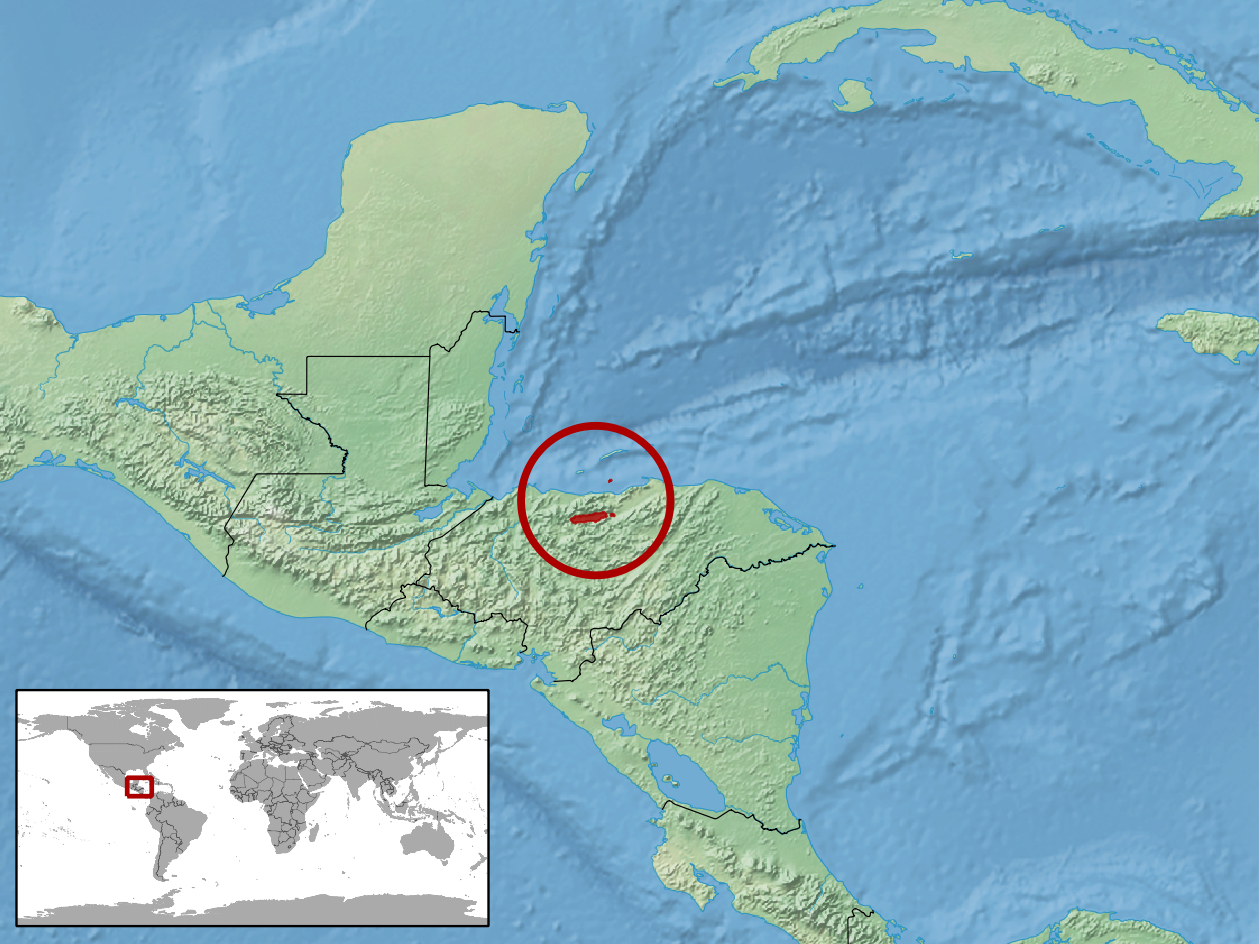

= Ctenosaura melanosterna =

Species of iguana

Ctenosaura melanosterna, commonly known as the black-chested spiny-tailed iguana or Honduran spinytailed iguana, is a species of iguana in the genus Ctenosaura. It is considered endangered.

== General Background ==
Currently, the population trend of the Ctenosaura melanosterna is decreasing, with approximately 2,500-5,000 mature adults left. The overall total number of this species is unknown, but what we do know is that the mature population is decreasing and severely fragmented. This species has two range areas, Aguán Valley and Cayos Cochinos, with more of the subpopulation inhabiting Aguán Valley. The density of the iguanas is so low that they are considered rare. The species' range is rapidly decreasing due to exploitation and habitat destruction.

== Life Span and Size ==
The typical life span of the Ctenosaura melanosterna, given the individual is healthy and dies from natural causes, is approximately 8 years. According to the International Iguana Foundation, male black-chested spiny-tailed iguanas in Cayos Cochinos average from 9.5 to 12.5 inches (24 to 32 cm) and weigh from 1.3–3.1 pounds (0.59–1.4 kg) pounds. In Aguán Valley, males are approximately 2 inches (5.1 cm) shorter and usually weight around half the weight than individuals in Cayos Cochinos.

== Geographic range ==
The black-chested spiny-tailed iguana is endemic to Honduras. It is only found in the Aguán Valley in northern Honduras, and on the Cayos Cochinos archipelago off the Caribbean coast, mainly on the islands Cayo Mayor and Cayo Pequeño.

== Habitat ==
The natural habitat of the black-chested spiny-tailed iguana is the scrubland and the dry forest. In the Aguán Valley, the iguanas can be found inside forests mainly consisting of Acacia and cacti. However, in the Cayos Cochinos archipelago, the iguanas are usually found in open forest and on cliffs.

== Diet ==
The iguanas are able to prey on smaller animals living in its habitat, such as arthropods, lizards, and fledglings. They are known to eat plant matter as well, such fruit and flowers.

== Reproduction ==
Female black-chested spiny-tailed iguanas are oviparous animals, which mean that they reproduce by laying eggs.

== Threats ==
There are a few reasons as to why the black-chested spiny-tailed iguana is endangered, but the most significant reason is human activity. Threats from humans include from hunting, trading, and habitat destruction and fragmentation. The forests in which the iguanas live are being cleared, mainly for agricultural purposes. The iguanas and their eggs are poached for human consumption as well. In addition, the Green iguana is also much more numerous throughout Central America, making it a competitor for food and resources.

== Conservation efforts ==
According to the IUCN, there is no actionary recovery plan, but there are efforts to provide a research and breeding station in the mainland on Honduras. Efforts to prevent further threats by illegal trade and over-harvesting to these iguana was to list them in CITES, which is the Convention on International Trade in Endangered Species of Wild Fauna and Flora.
