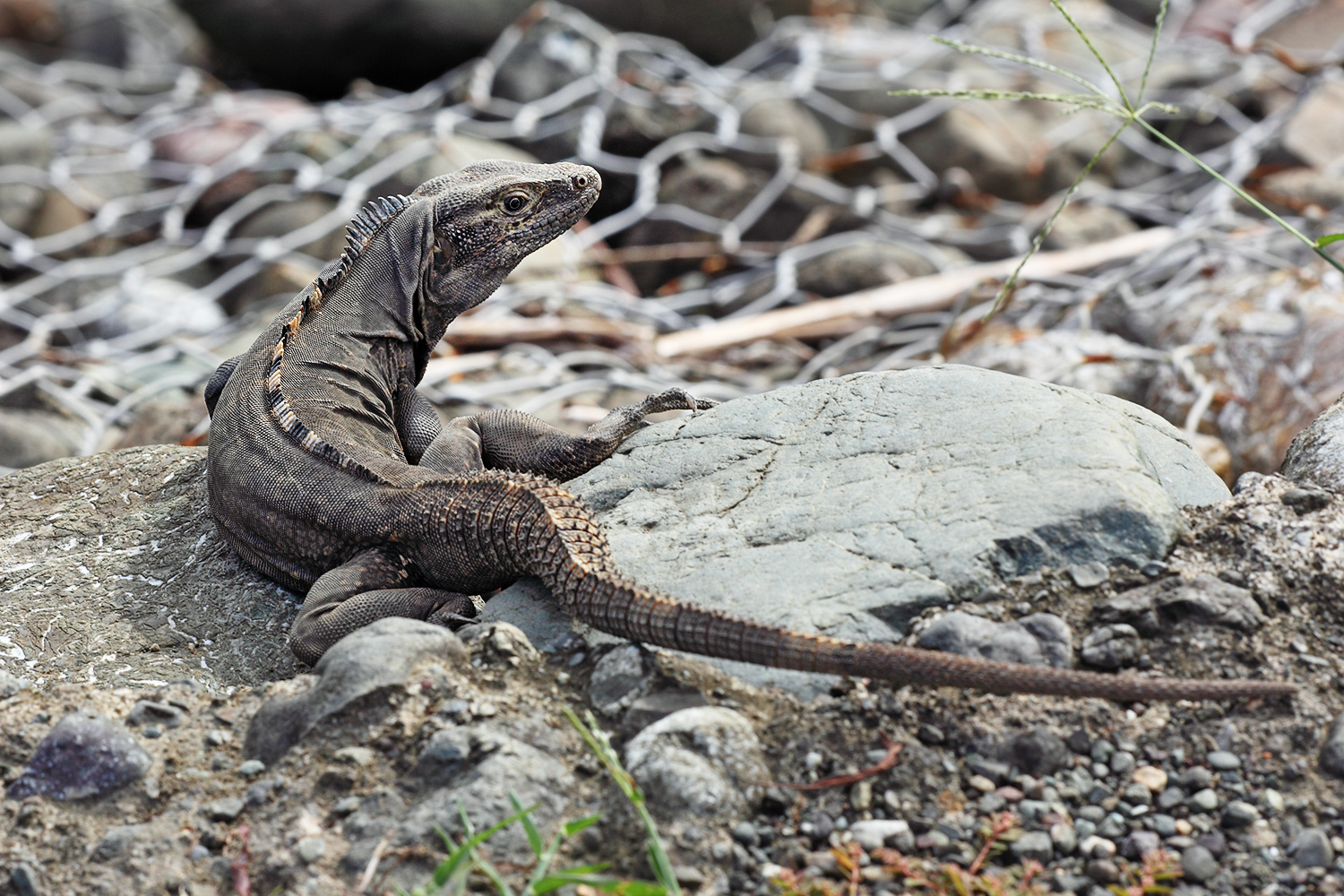

Conservation status
- Data Deficient (IUCN 3.1)
- CITES Appendix II

Scientific classification
- Kingdom: Animalia
- Phylum: Chordata
- Class: Reptilia
- Order: Squamata
- Suborder: Iguania
- Family: Iguanidae
- Genus: Ctenosaura
- Species: C. quinquecarinata

Binomial name
- Ctenosaura quinquecarinata (Gray, 1842)

Synonyms
- Cyclura quinquecarinata Gray, 1842; Enyaliosaurus quinquecarinatus – Gray, 1845; Ctenosaura quinquecarinata – Bocourt, 1874

= Ctenosaura quinquecarinata =

Species of lizard

Ctenosaura quinquecarinata, commonly known as the Oaxacan spinytail iguana or the five-keeled spiny-tailed iguana is a species of lizard in the family Iguanidae native to Central America.

== Geographic range ==
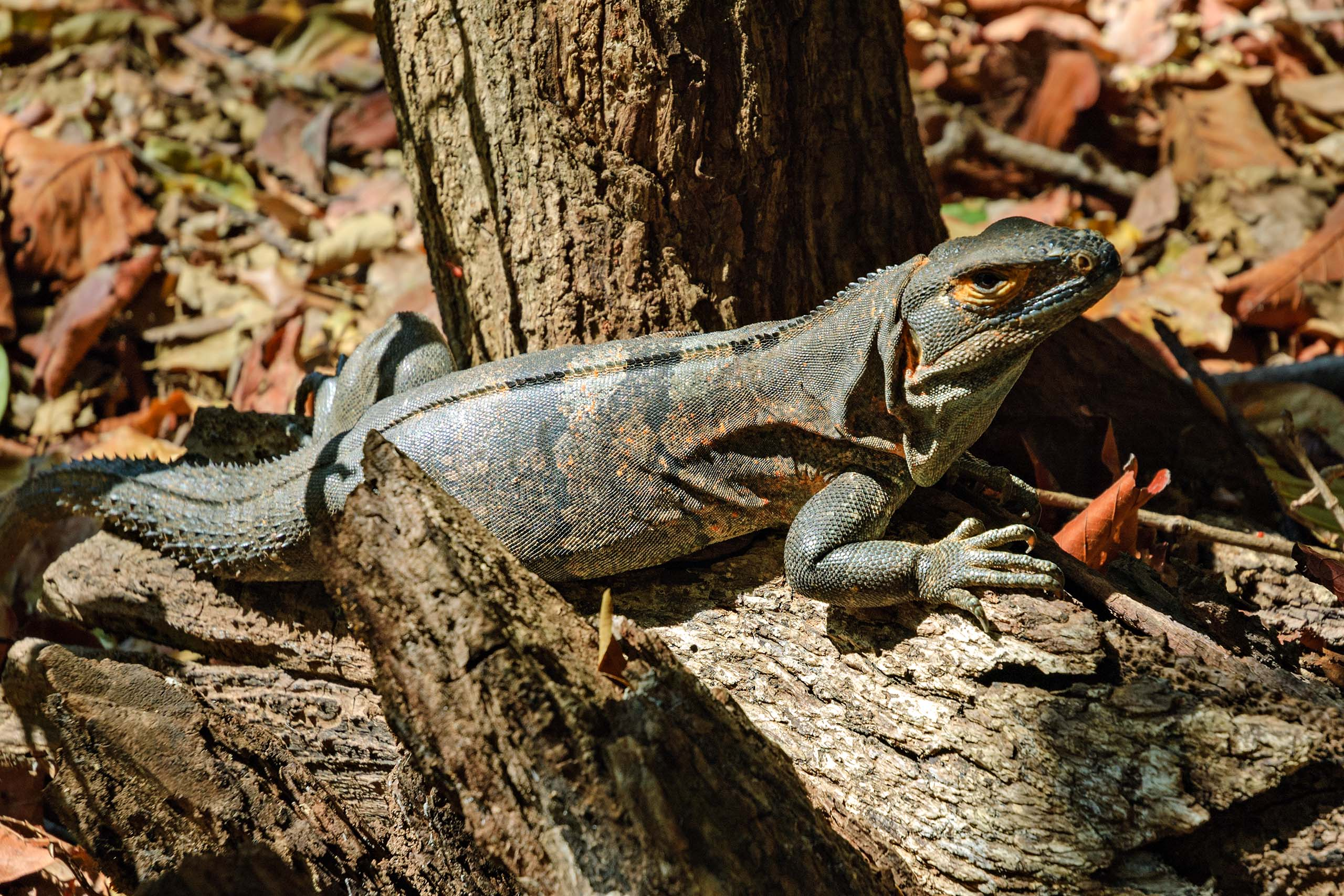
Ctenosaura quinquecarinata - Club-tailed iguana, Santa Rosa National Park, Costa Rica

It is found in Costa Rica and Nicaragua. Other sources list it also from Mexico and El Salvador.

== Habitat ==
Its natural habitat is tropical dry forests.

== Conservation status ==
It is threatened in its native range by habitat loss.

== Taxonomy and etymology ==
Ctenosaura quinquecarinata was first described by zoologist John Edward Gray in 1842 as Cyclura quinquecarinata; 32 years later it was redesignated by Marie Firmin Bocourt as Ctenosaura quinquecarinata. The generic name, Ctenosaura, is derived from two Greek words: ctenos (Κτενός), meaning "comb" (referring to the comblike spines on the lizard's back and tail), and saura (σαύρα), meaning "lizard". Its specific name quinquecarinata is a combination of two Latin words: quinque meaning "five" and carinata meaning "keeled" and refers to the five rows of scales on the animal's tail.

== Description ==
The tail on this species is heavily armored with five rings of spines forming longitudinal ridges. Males of the species grow to a length of 35 centimeters (14 in) whereas females attain 18.5 centimeters (7.3 in). Like most Ctenosaura the iguanas are born a bright green color fading to brown as the animal ages. The females tend to turn a uniform drab brown in color, and males develop tones of black, blue and yellow on their bodies and heads over the brown background.

== Threats ==
Total population size is not known, but it is estimated that there may be fewer than 2,500 mature individuals. It is threatened by habitat loss through deforestation, overcollection through an unregulated exploitation for the pet trade, and it is even hunted by humans as a food item.
