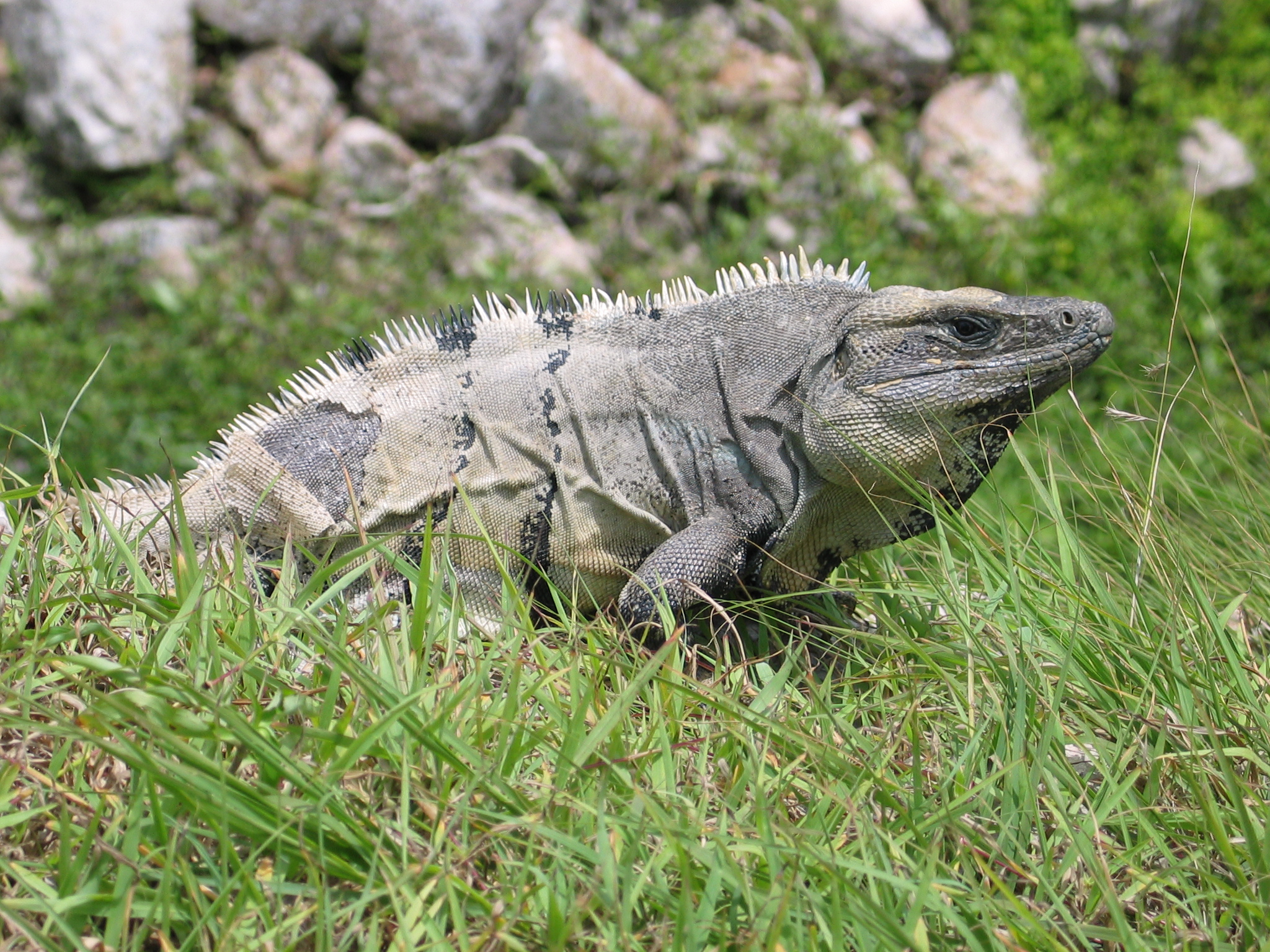
- Black spiny-tailed iguana in Mexico

Scientific classification
- Kingdom: Animalia
- Phylum: Chordata
- Class: Reptilia
- Order: Squamata
- Suborder: Iguania
- Family: Iguanidae
- Genus: Ctenosaura; Wiegmann, 1828

Type species
- Ctenosaura acanthura

= Ctenosaura =

Genus of lizards

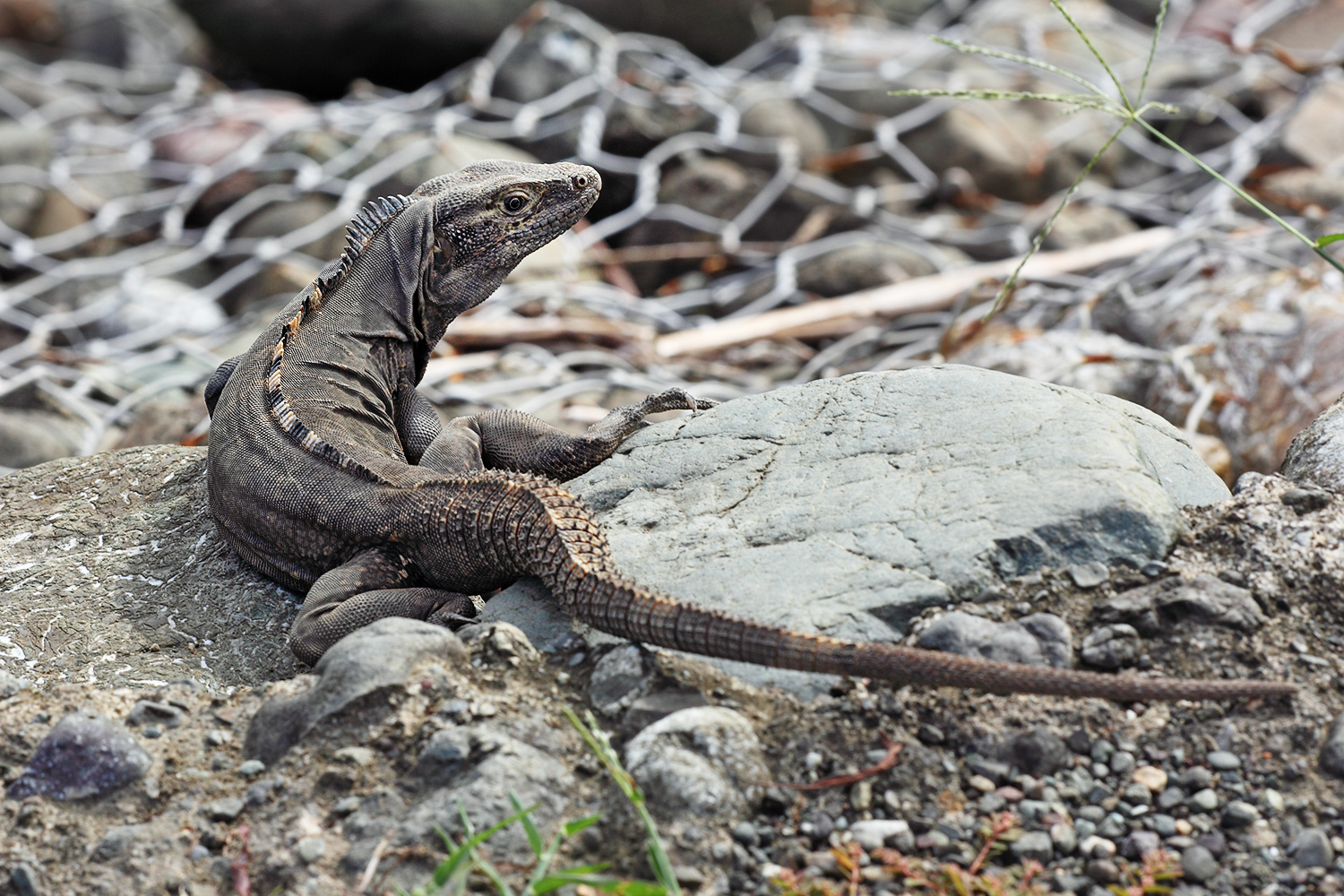
Ctenosaura similis, Costa Rica

Ctenosaura is a lizard genus commonly known as spinytail iguanas or ctenosaurs. The genus is part of the large lizard family Iguanidae and is native to Mexico and Central America. The name is derived from two Greek words: κτενός (ctenos), meaning "comb" (referring to the comblike spines on the lizard's back and tail), and σαύρα (saura), meaning "lizard".

== Description ==
The species range in size (total length, including the tail) from about 12.5 centimetres (4.9 in) to well over 1 metre (39 in). The distinctive feature of this genus is the presence of enlarged, spiny scales on the tail.

== Ecology and natural history ==
Ctenosaurs are generally omnivorous, feeding on fruits, flowers, foliage, and small animals.

While studying physiological correlates of locomotion in lizards, a "burst speed" of 34.6 km/h (21.5 miles/h) was recorded by a black spiny-tail iguana (Ctenosaura similis), which is the highest speed reported for a lizard.

== Captivity ==
C. pectinata, C. similis, and C. quinquecarinata are popular as pets.

== Invasive species ==
At least two species, Ctenosaura pectinata and Ctenosaura similis, have been introduced into southern areas of Texas and Florida. They are also now in southern Arizona.

== Species ==
The genus Ctenosaura represents the most diverse group of iguanas with 15 currently recognized species and at least two unrecognized species. These species inhabit lowland dry forests, woodlands and semi-open habitats, below 1,200 metres (3,900 ft) elevation, on both coasts of Mexico and Central America. The species in the genus Ctenosaura belong in several different clades. Closely related species show allopatry whereas species from divergent clades show sympatry. Until 2017, the two species of Cachryx were included in Ctenosaura.

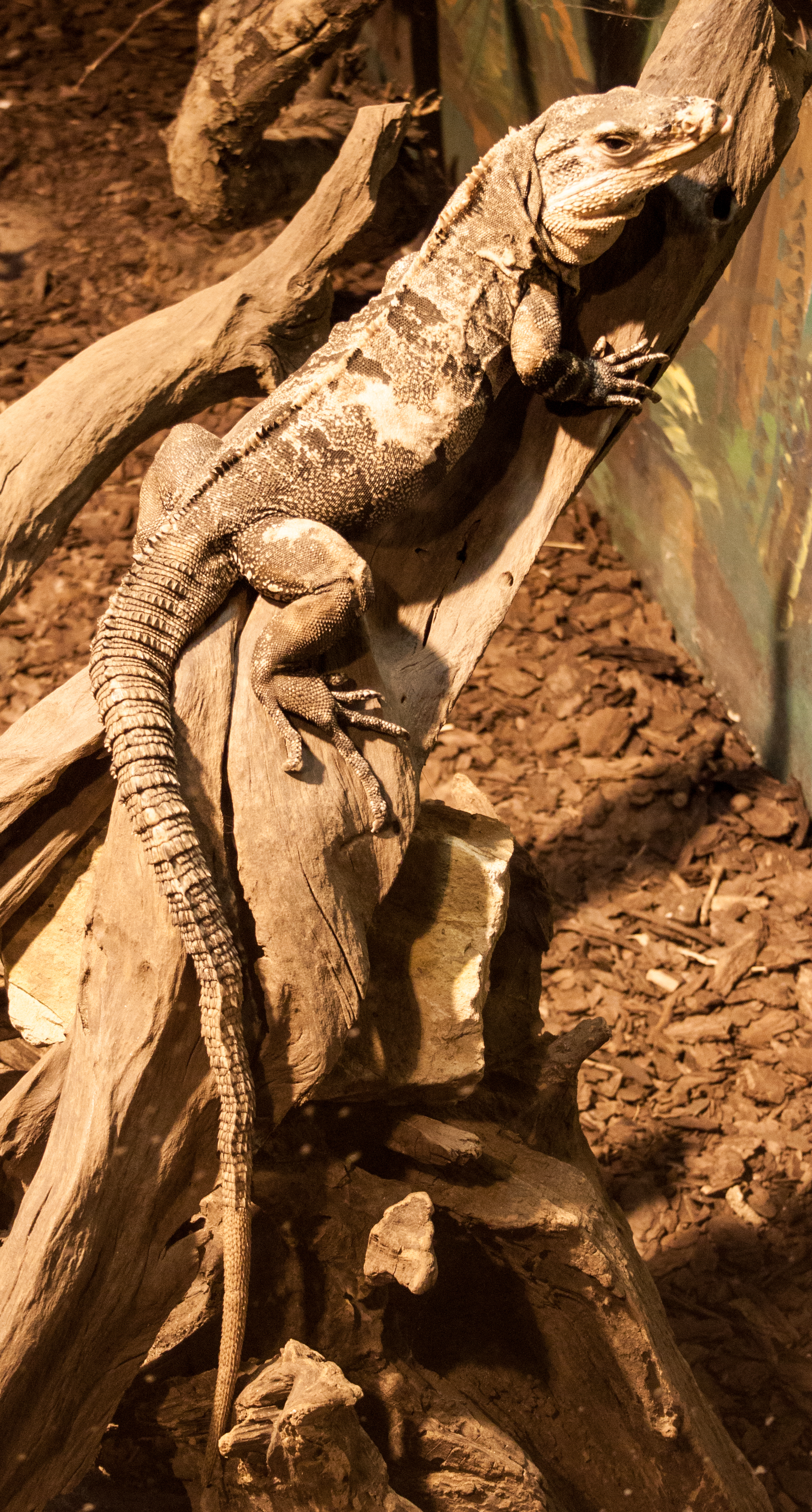
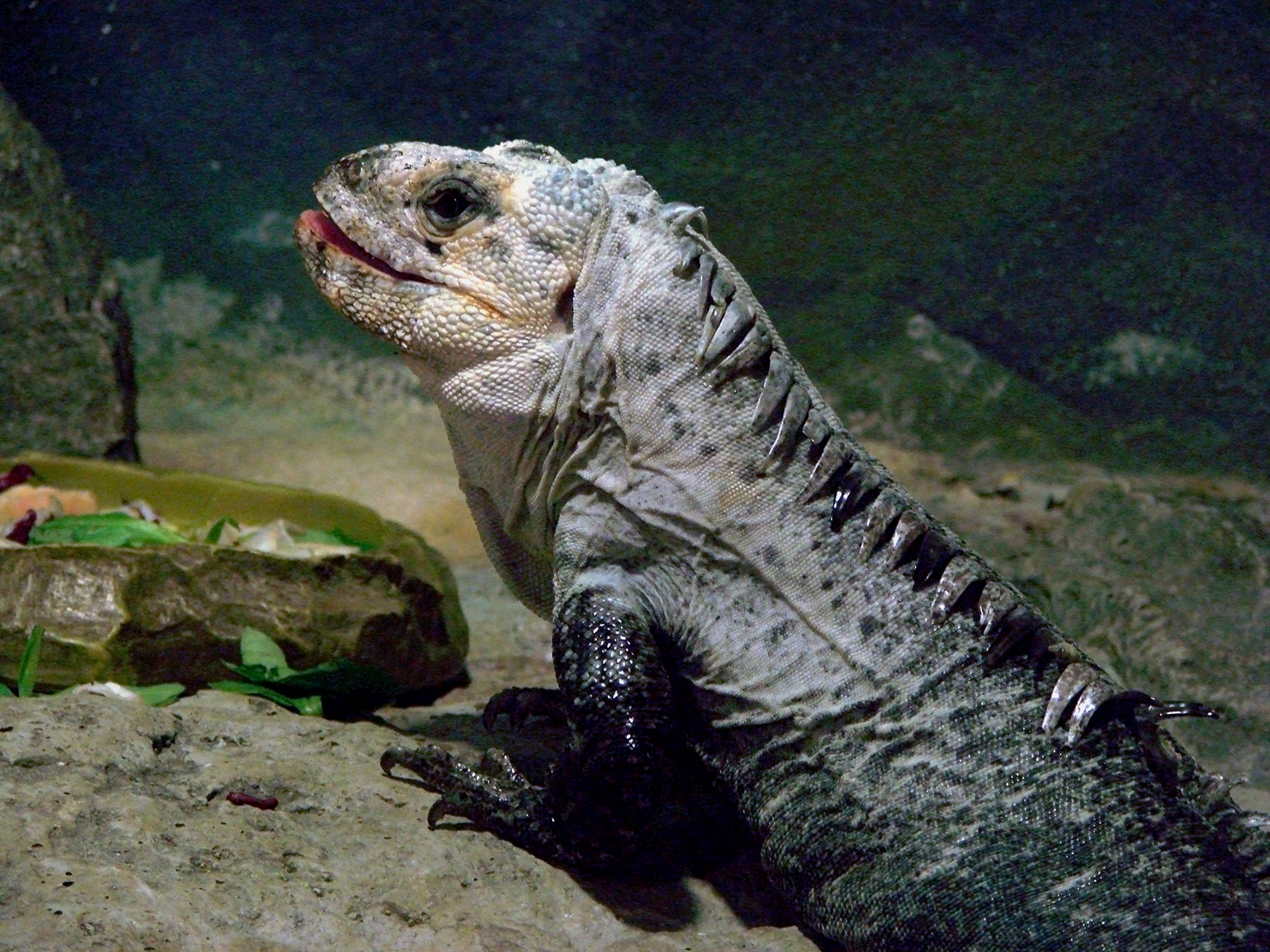
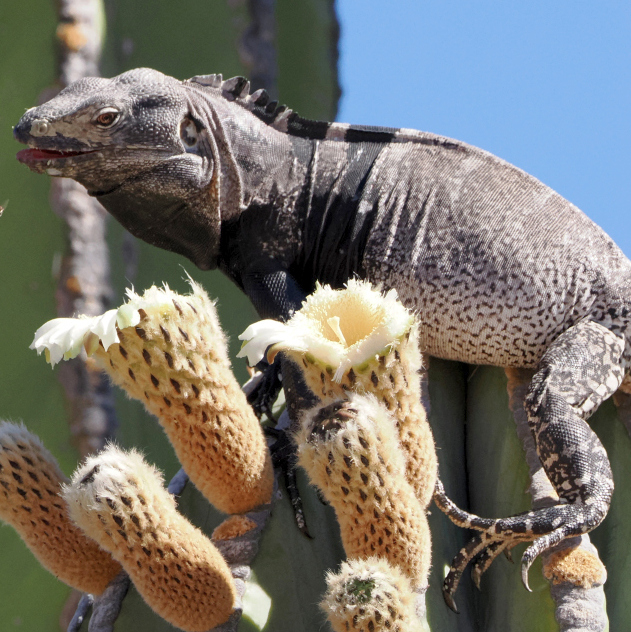
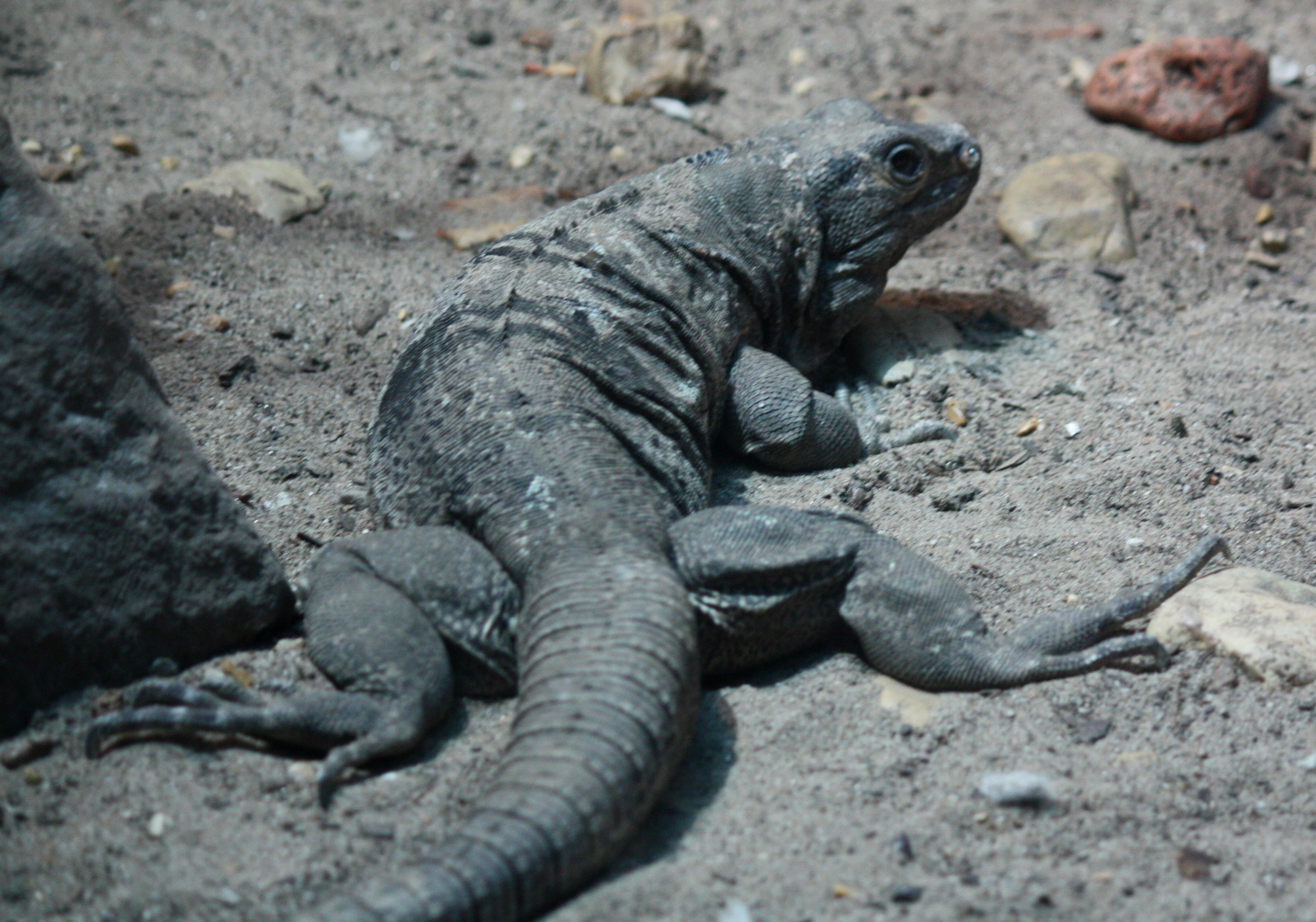
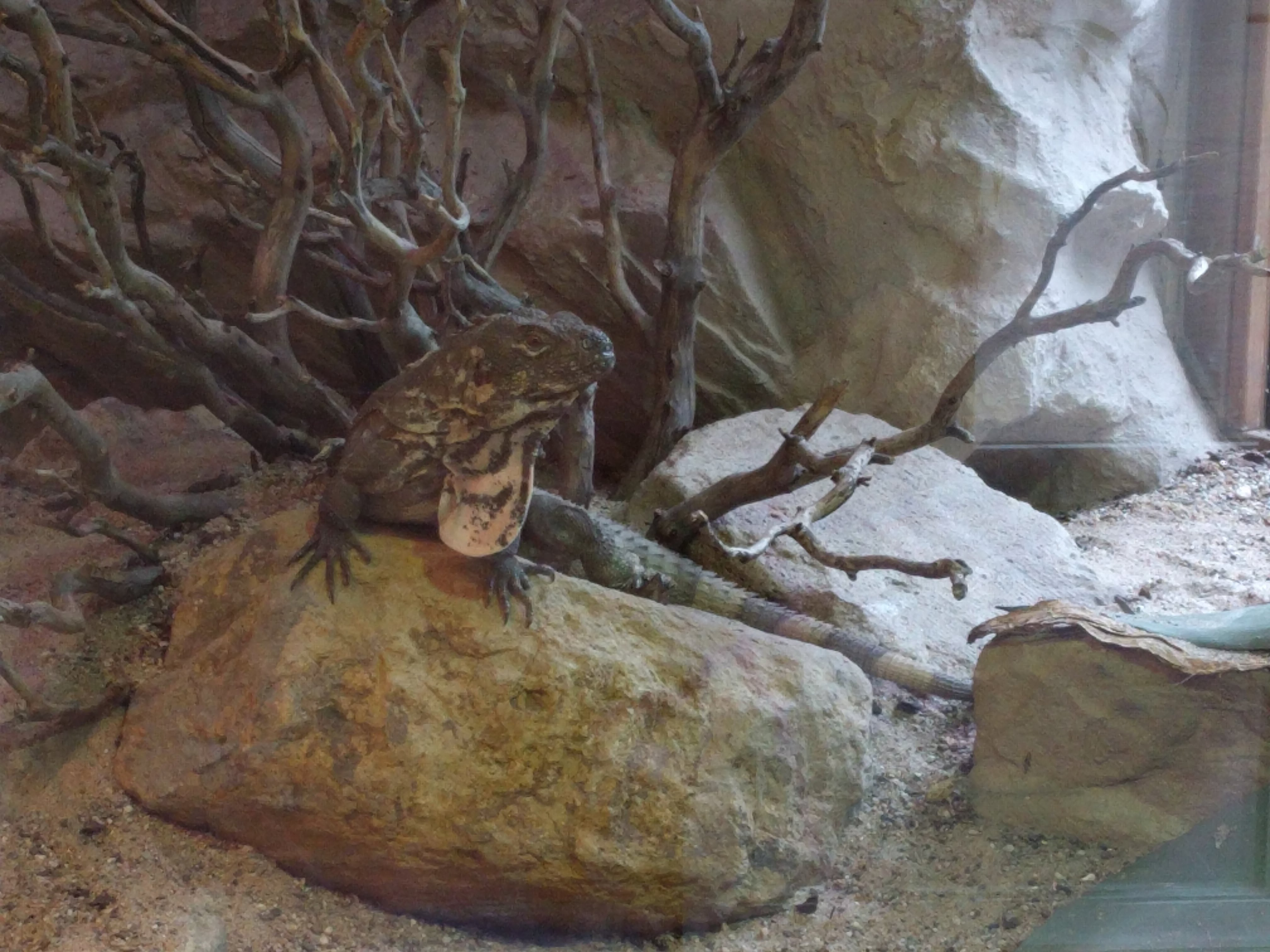
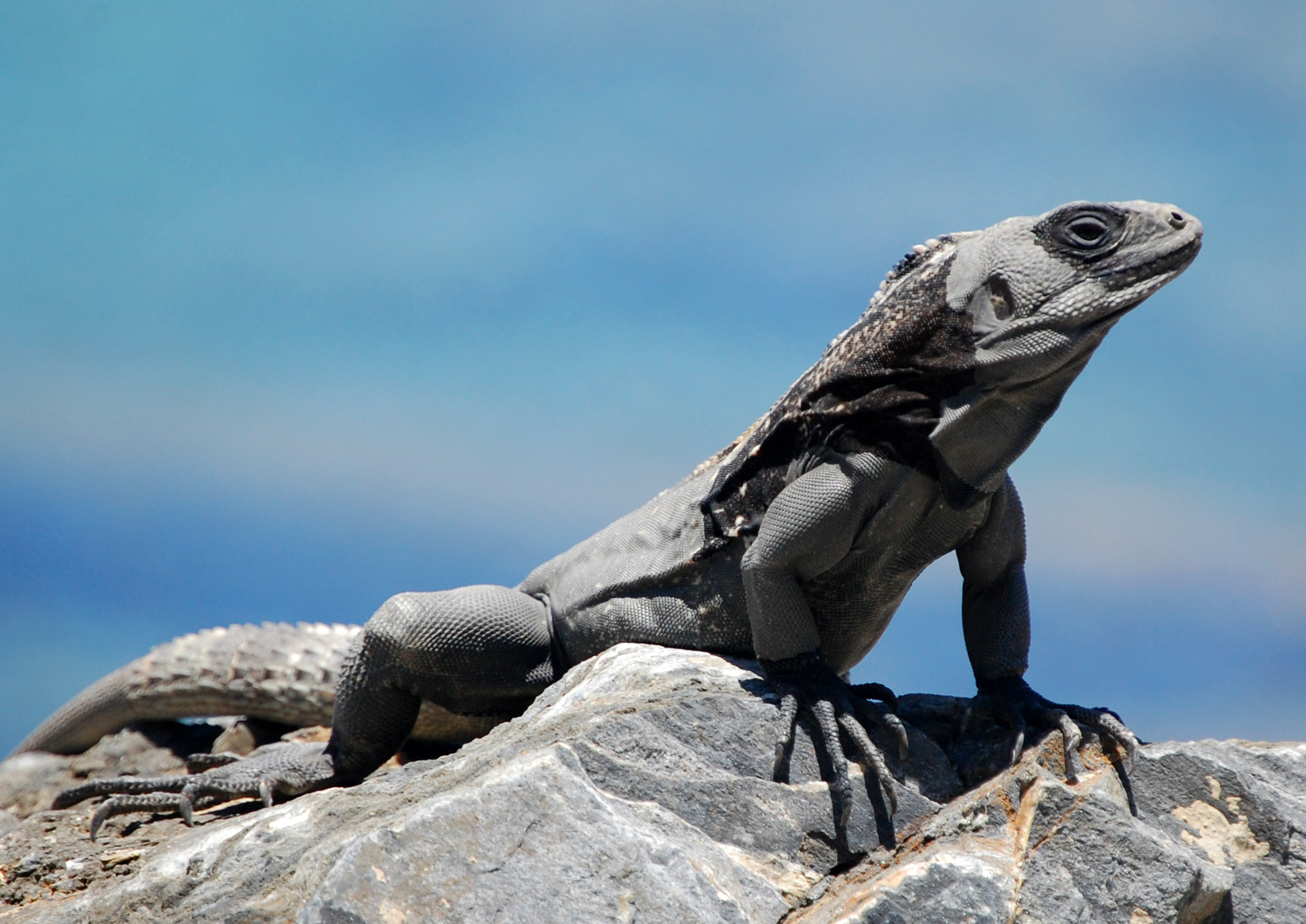
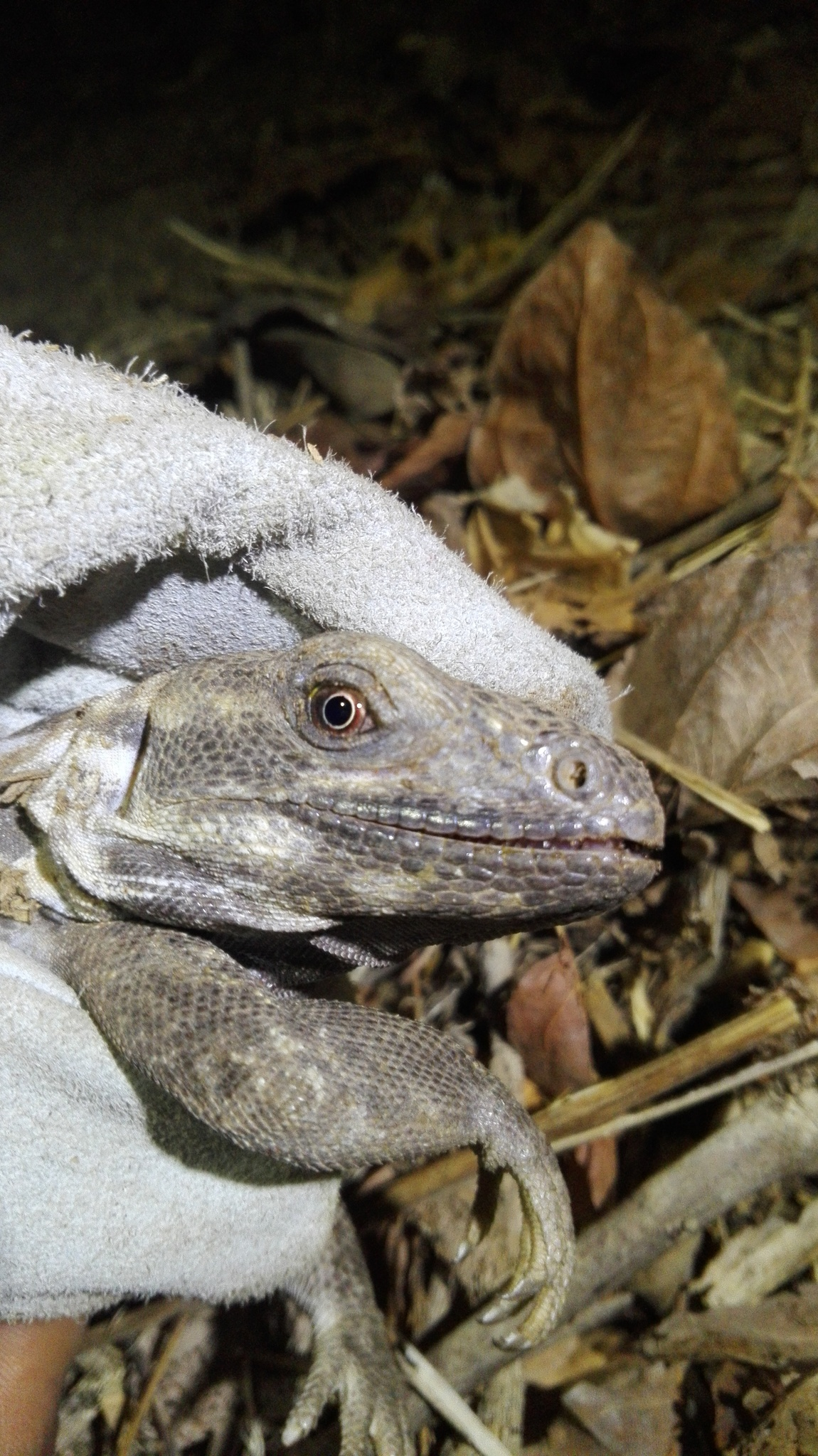
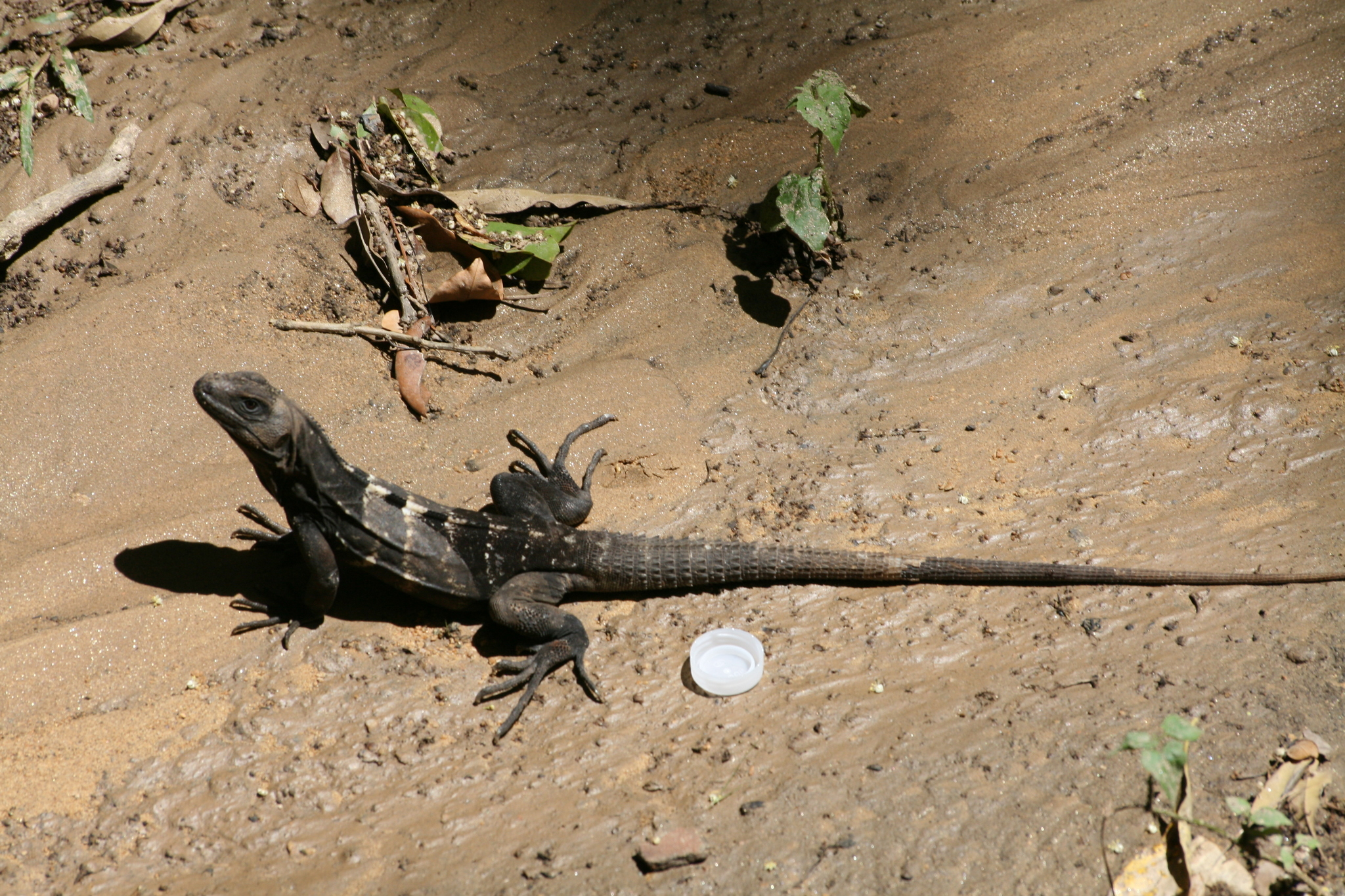
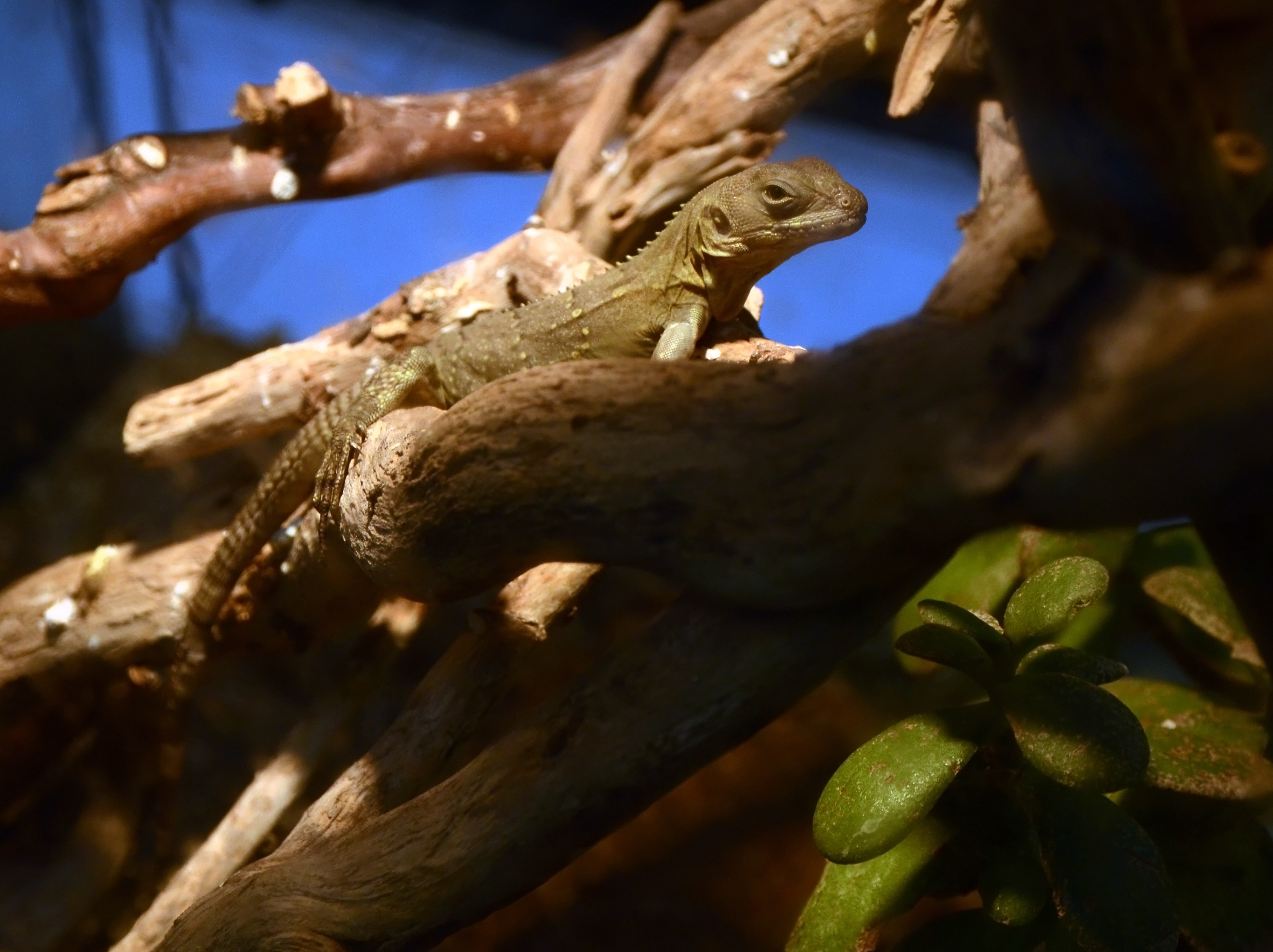
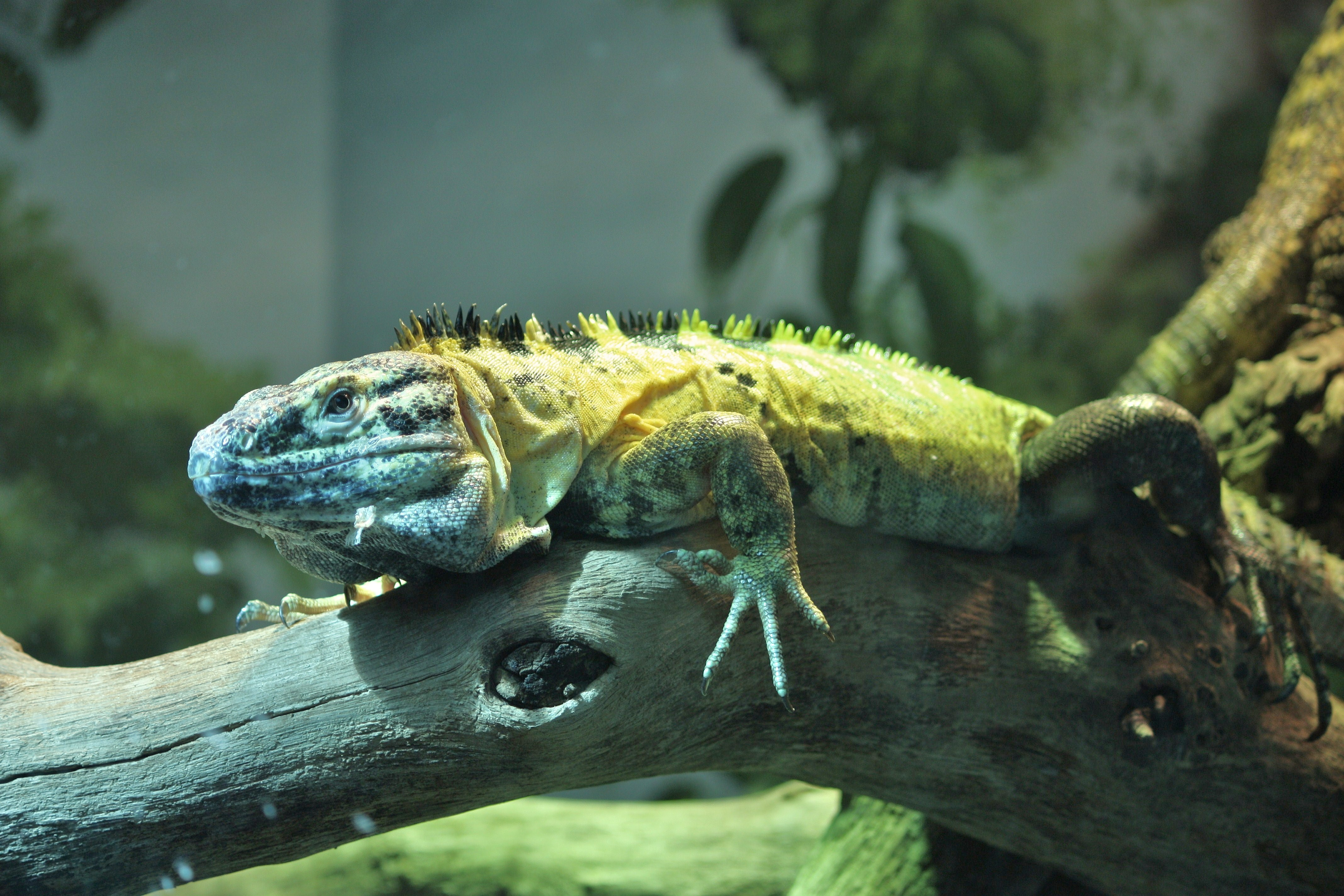
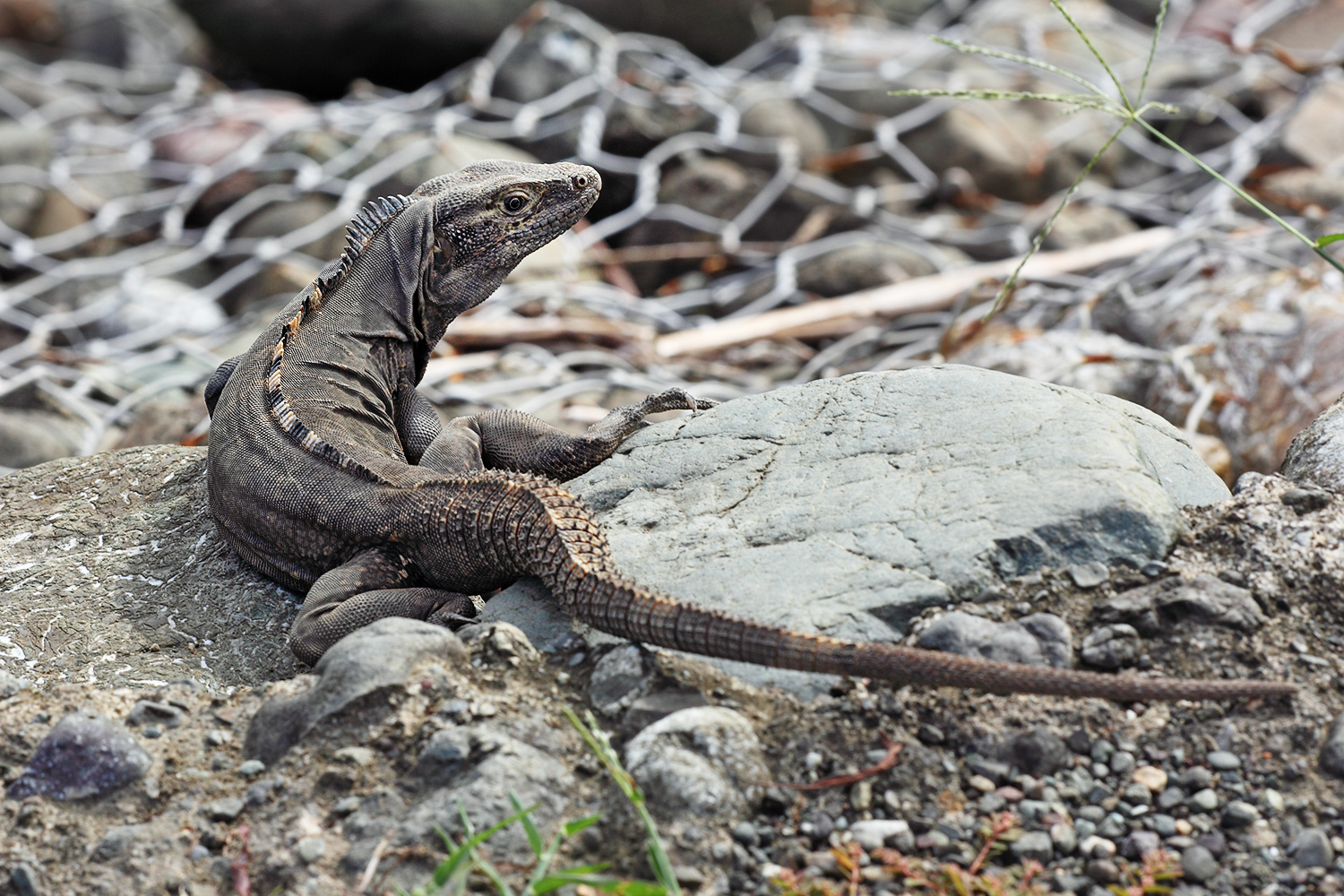
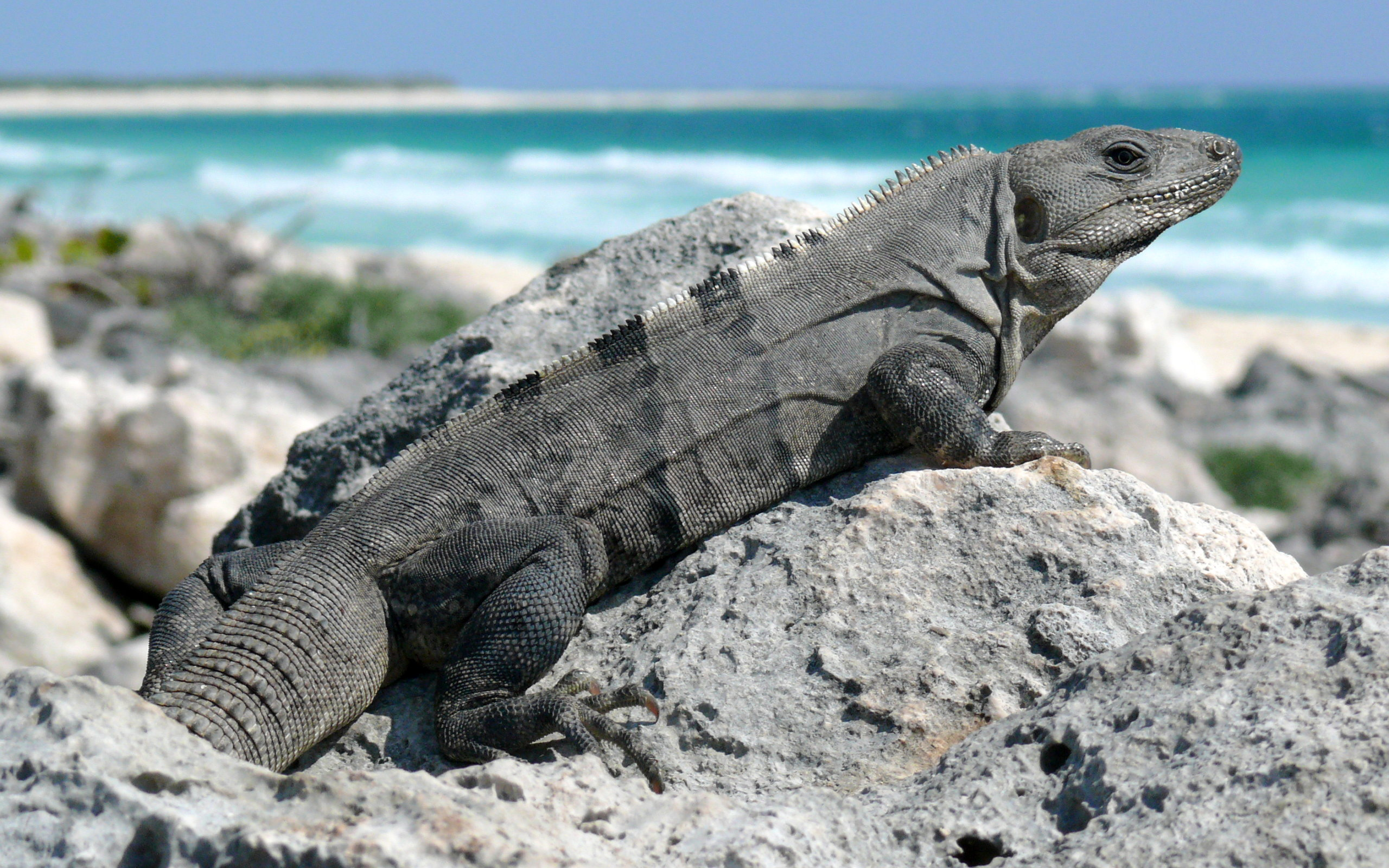
Image	Species	Common name	Authority	Geographic range
	Ctenosaura acanthura	Mexican spiny-tailed iguana	(Shaw, 1802)	Eastern Mexico
	Ctenosaura bakeri	Baker's spinytail iguana	Stejneger, 1901	Utila island off Honduras
	Ctenosaura clarki	Michoacan club tail	Bailey, 1928	Western Mexico
	Ctenosaura conspicuosa	Isla San Esteban spiny-tailed iguana	Dickerson, 1919	San Esteban Island, Gulf of California
	Ctenosaura flavidorsalis	Yellowback spinytail iguana	G. Köhler & Klemmer, 1994	Honduras, El Salvador, and Guatemala
	Ctenosaura hemilopha	Cape spiny-tail iguana	(Cope, 1863)	Southern half of Baja California, Mexico
	Ctenosaura macrolopha	Sonora spiny-tailed iguana	Smith, H. M. 1972	Sonora, Mexico
	Ctenosaura melanosterna	Black-chested spinytail iguana	Buckley & Axtell, 1997	Honduras
	Ctenosaura nolascensis	Isla San Pedro Nolasco spiny-tailed iguana	Smith, H. M. 1972	San Pedro Nolasco Island, Gulf of California
	Ctenosaura oaxacana	Oaxacan spiny-tail iguana	G. Köhler & Hasbún, 2001	Oaxaca, Mexico
	Ctenosaura oedirhina	Roatán spinytail iguana	de Queiroz, 1987	Roatán, Honduras
	Ctenosaura palearis	Guatemalan spinytail iguana	Stejneger, 1899	Guatemala
	Ctenosaura pectinata	Western spiny-tail iguana	(Wiegmann, 1834)	Western Mexico. Introduced to southern areas of Texas and Florida.
	Ctenosaura quinquecarinata	Club tail iguana	Gray, 1842	Nicaragua and Costa Rica.
	Ctenosaura similis	Black spiny-tail iguana	(Gray, 1831)	Mexico and Central America; reported in some Colombian islands, introduced to southern Florida.
