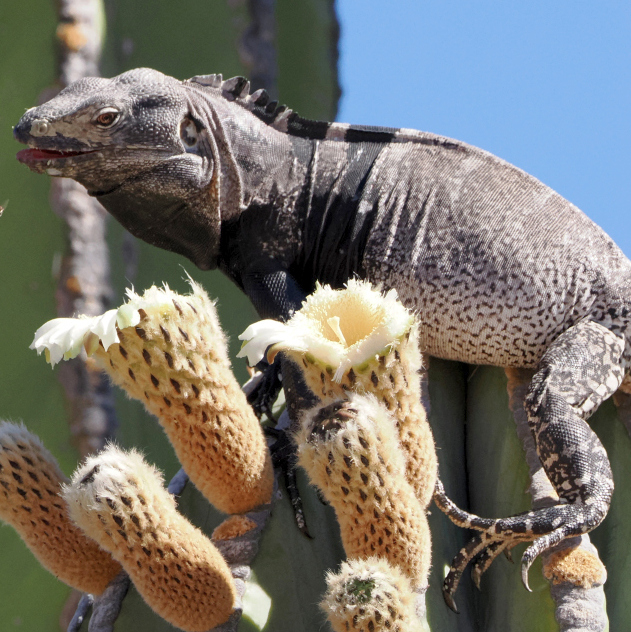

Conservation status
- Vulnerable (IUCN 3.1)
- CITES Appendix II

Scientific classification
- Kingdom: Animalia
- Phylum: Chordata
- Class: Reptilia
- Order: Squamata
- Suborder: Iguania
- Family: Iguanidae
- Genus: Ctenosaura
- Species: C. conspicuosa

Binomial name
- Ctenosaura conspicuosa Dickerson, 1919

= Ctenosaura conspicuosa =

Species of lizard

Ctenosaura conspicuosa, commonly known as the San Esteban spinytail iguana is a species of lizard in the family Iguanidae.

== Geographic range ==
Ctenosaura conspicuosa is endemic to San Esteban Island in Mexico.
