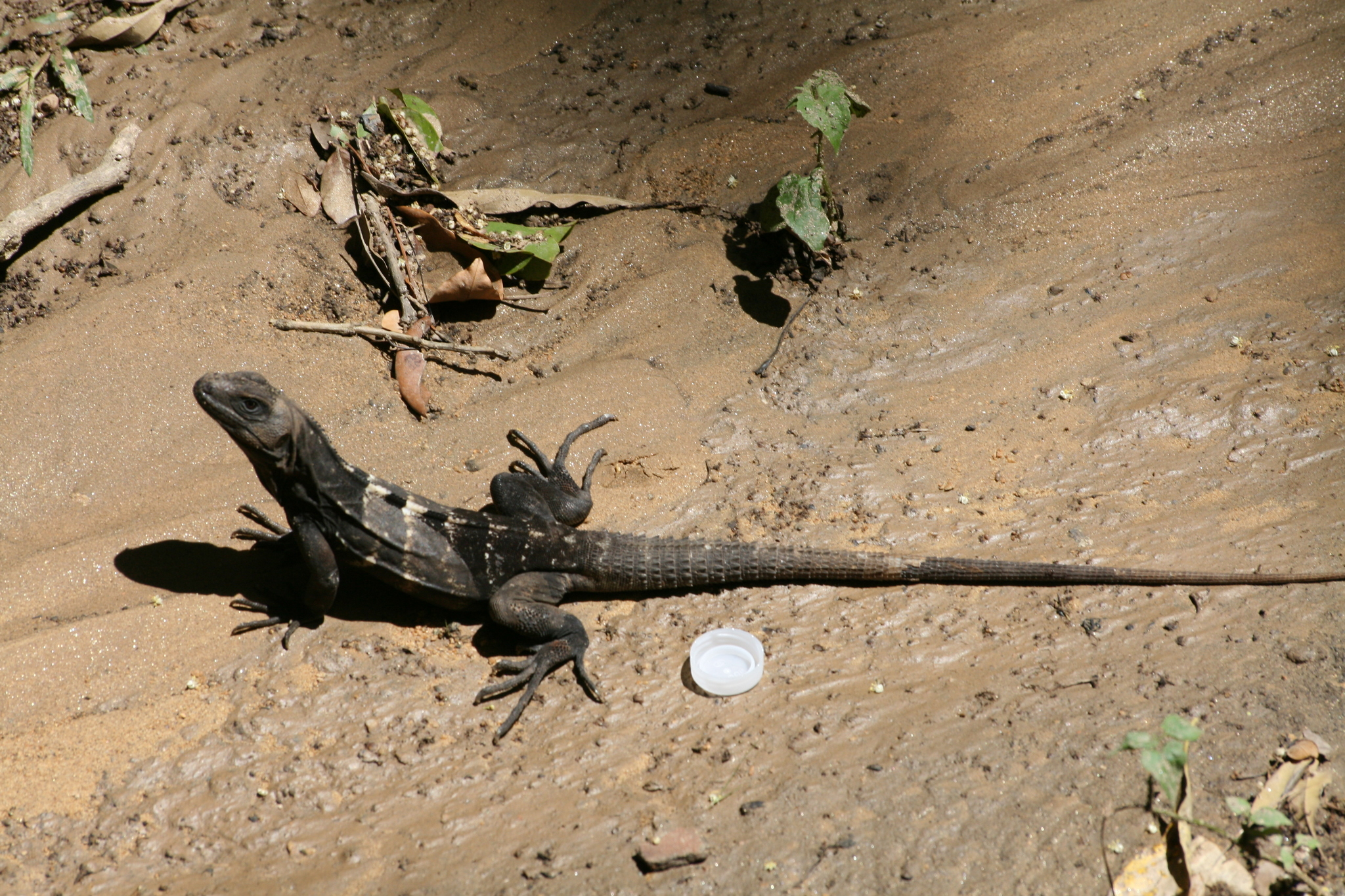

Conservation status
- Endangered (IUCN 3.1)
- CITES Appendix II

Scientific classification
- Kingdom: Animalia
- Phylum: Chordata
- Class: Reptilia
- Order: Squamata
- Suborder: Iguania
- Family: Iguanidae
- Genus: Ctenosaura
- Species: C. oedirhina

Binomial name
- Ctenosaura oedirhina de Queiroz, 1987
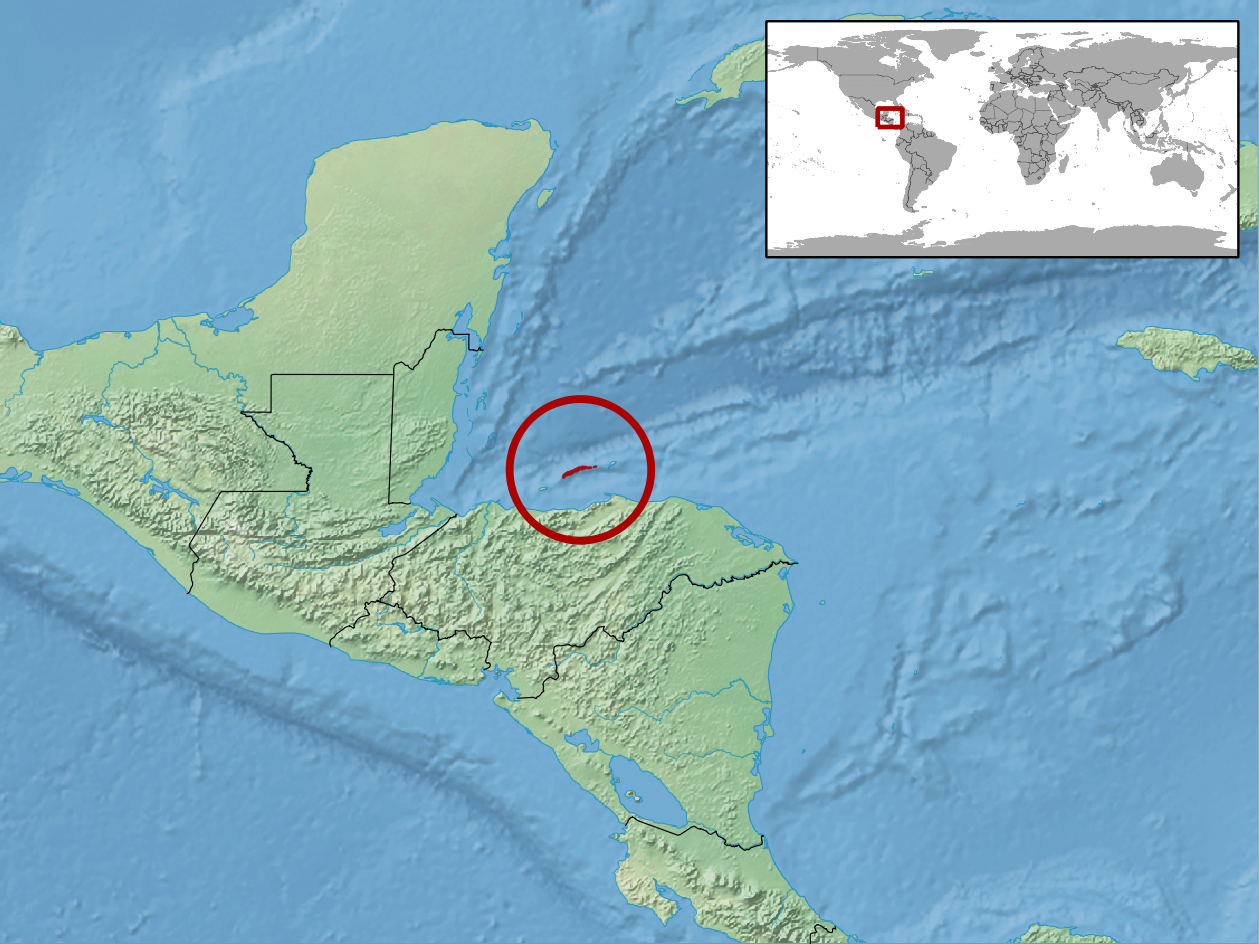

= Ctenosaura oedirhina =

Species of lizard

Ctenosaura oedirhina, commonly known as the Roatán spiny-tailed iguana or de Queiroz's spiny-tailed iguana, is a species of lizard in the family Iguanidae. It is endemic to Honduras, on the island of Roatán in the Caribbean, to which one of its common names refers. The Roatán iguana is a medium sized iguana with a rounded snout, short crest scales, and a snout-vent length ranging from 151 to 325mm.

== Habitat ==
Its natural habitat is subtropical or tropical dry forests.

== Conservation status ==
It is currently listed an endangered species under the International Union for Conservation of Nature (IUCN). It is threatened by habitat loss.
