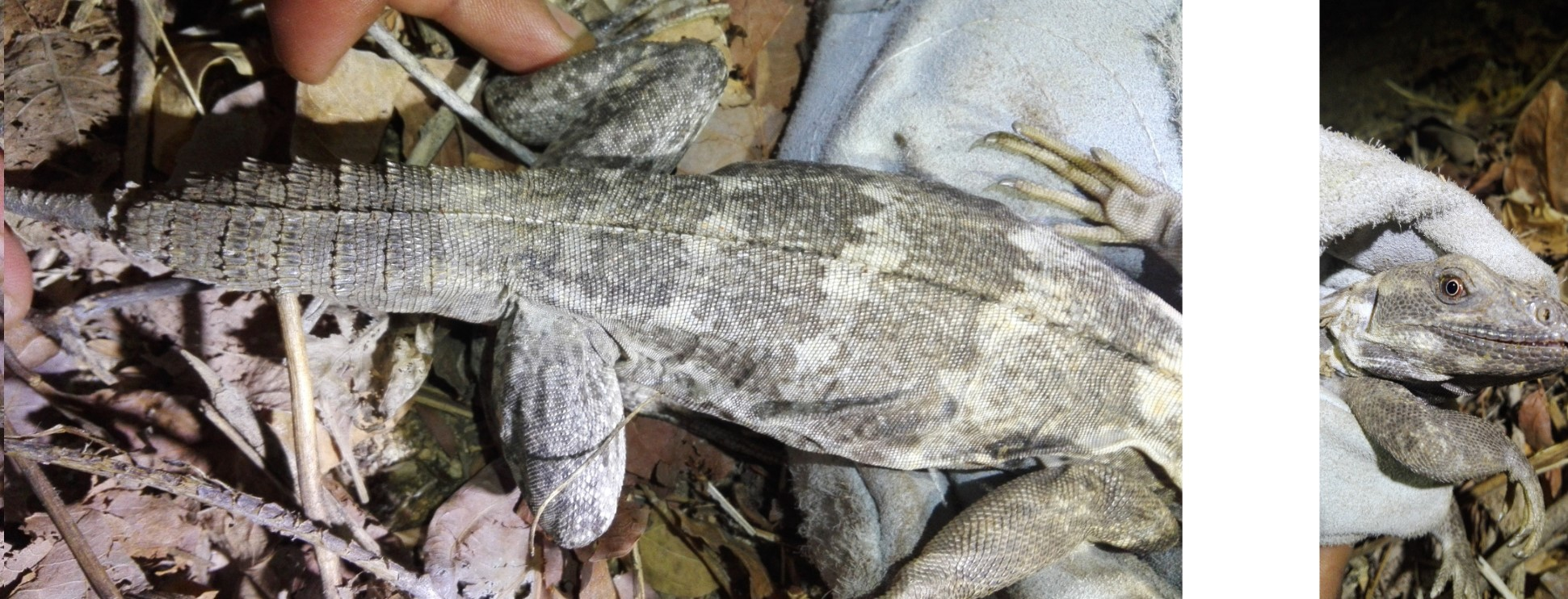
- Composite image

Conservation status
- Critically Endangered (IUCN 3.1)
- CITES Appendix II (CITES)

Scientific classification
- Kingdom: Animalia
- Phylum: Chordata
- Class: Reptilia
- Order: Squamata
- Suborder: Iguania
- Family: Iguanidae
- Genus: Ctenosaura
- Species: C. oaxacana

Binomial name
- Ctenosaura oaxacana Köhler & Hasbún, 2001

= Ctenosaura oaxacana =

Species of lizard

Ctenosaura oaxacana, commonly known as the Oaxacan spiny-tailed iguana, is a species of lizard in the family Iguanidae. It is endemic to Mexico.

== Geographic range ==
It is found in the Mexican state of Oaxaca.

== Habitat ==
Its natural habitat is subtropical or tropical dry forests.

== Conservation status ==
It is threatened by habitat loss.
