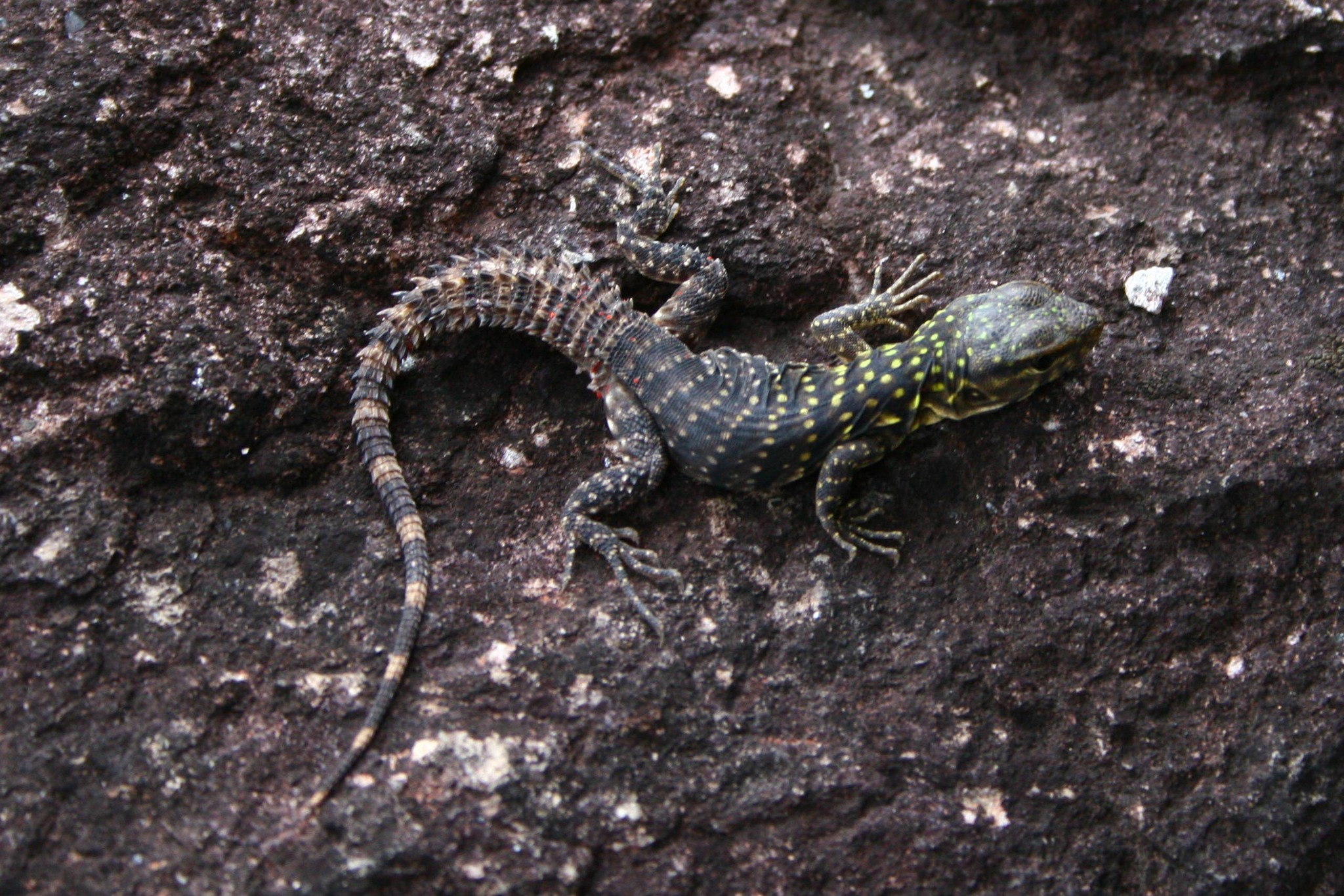

Conservation status
- Near Threatened (IUCN 3.1)
- CITES Appendix II

Scientific classification
- Kingdom: Animalia
- Phylum: Chordata
- Class: Reptilia
- Order: Squamata
- Suborder: Iguania
- Family: Iguanidae
- Genus: Ctenosaura
- Species: C. flavidorsalis

Binomial name
- Ctenosaura flavidorsalis Köhler & Klemmer, 1994

= Ctenosaura flavidorsalis =

Species of lizard

Ctenosaura flavidorsalis, commonly known as the yellow-backed spiny-tailed iguana, is a species of lizard in the family Iguanidae.

== Distribution ==
It is found in El Salvador, Guatemala, and Honduras.

== Habitat ==
Its natural habitat is subtropical or tropical dry forests.

== Conservation status ==
It is threatened by habitat loss.
