= Ctenosaura clarki =

Conservation status
- Vulnerable (IUCN 3.1)
- CITES Appendix II (CITES)

Scientific classification
- Kingdom: Animalia
- Phylum: Chordata
- Class: Reptilia
- Order: Squamata
- Suborder: Iguania
- Family: Iguanidae
- Genus: Ctenosaura
- Species: C. clarki

Binomial name
- Ctenosaura clarki J.W. Bailey, 1928

Synonyms
- Ctenosaura clarki J.W. Bailey, 1928; Enyaliosaurus clarki — H.M. Smith & Taylor, 1950; Ctenosaura clarki — Liner, 1994; Ctenosaura (Enyaliosaurus) clarki — G. Köhler et al., 2000; Ctenosaura clarki — Cruz-Sáenz et al., 2017

Species of lizard

Ctenosaura clarki, commonly known as the Balsas armed lizard, Balsas spiny-tailed iguana, Michoacán dwarf spiny-tailed iguana, or nopiche, is a species of lizard in the family Iguanidae. The species native to Mexico.

== Etymology ==
The specific name, clarki, is in honor of Dr. Herbert Charles Clark (1877–1960), director of medical research and laboratories, United Fruit Co., for his support of the herpetological collection of the Museum of Comparative Zoology, Harvard University.

== Geographic range ==
C. clarki is endemic to the Balsas dry forests in the state of Michoacán in western Mexico.

== Behavior ==
A semi-arboreal species, C. clarki shelters in hollow branches of tree cacti.

== Reproduction ==
C. clarki is oviparous.

== Conservation status ==
C. clarki is threatened by habitat loss.
