= Anolis utilensis =

Conservation status
- Critically Endangered (IUCN 3.1)

Scientific classification
- Kingdom: Animalia
- Phylum: Chordata
- Class: Reptilia
- Order: Squamata
- Suborder: Iguania
- Family: Dactyloidae
- Genus: Anolis
- Species: A. utilensis

Binomial name
- Anolis utilensis (Köhler, 1996)

Species of lizard

Anolis utilensis, the Utila anole or mangrove anole, is a species of lizard in the family Dactyloidae. The species is found in Honduras.
