= The Fledgling =

1980 children's novel by Jane Langton

The Fledgling is a 1980 children's novel by Jane Langton. The story, set in Concord, Massachusetts, follows a young girl who believes she can fly and explores themes of environmentalism and transcendentalism. It is the fourth book in the Hall Family Chronicles series. The book was a Newbery Honor selection in 1981 and is an American Library Association Notable Children's Book.

== Characters ==
- Georgina "Georgie" Dorian - a small girl who believes that she can fly
- The Goose Prince - a Canada goose who teaches Georgina to fly
- Eleanor Hall - Georgina's orphaned stepcousin
- Edward "Eddy" Hall - Eleanor's brother
- Frederick "Uncle Freddy" Hall - Georgina's stepfather; married to Alex Hall
- Alexandra "Aunt Alex" Hall - Georgina's stepmother; married to Frederick Hall
- Mr. Ralph Alonzo Preek - a hunter obsessed with The Goose Prince
