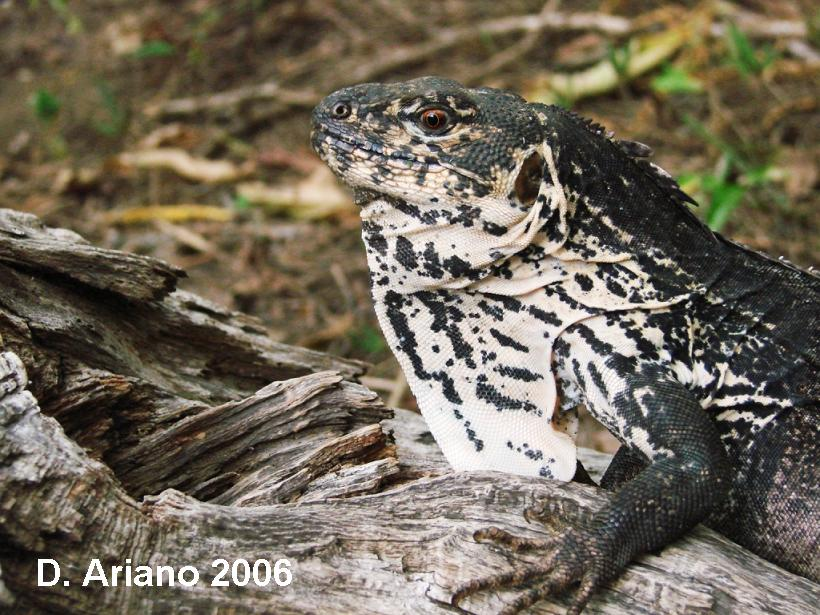
- Guatemalan spiny-tailed iguana

Conservation status
- Endangered (IUCN 3.1)
- CITES Appendix II (CITES)

Scientific classification
- Kingdom: Animalia
- Phylum: Chordata
- Class: Reptilia
- Order: Squamata
- Suborder: Iguania
- Family: Iguanidae
- Genus: Ctenosaura
- Species: C. palearis

Binomial name
- Ctenosaura palearis Stejneger, 1899
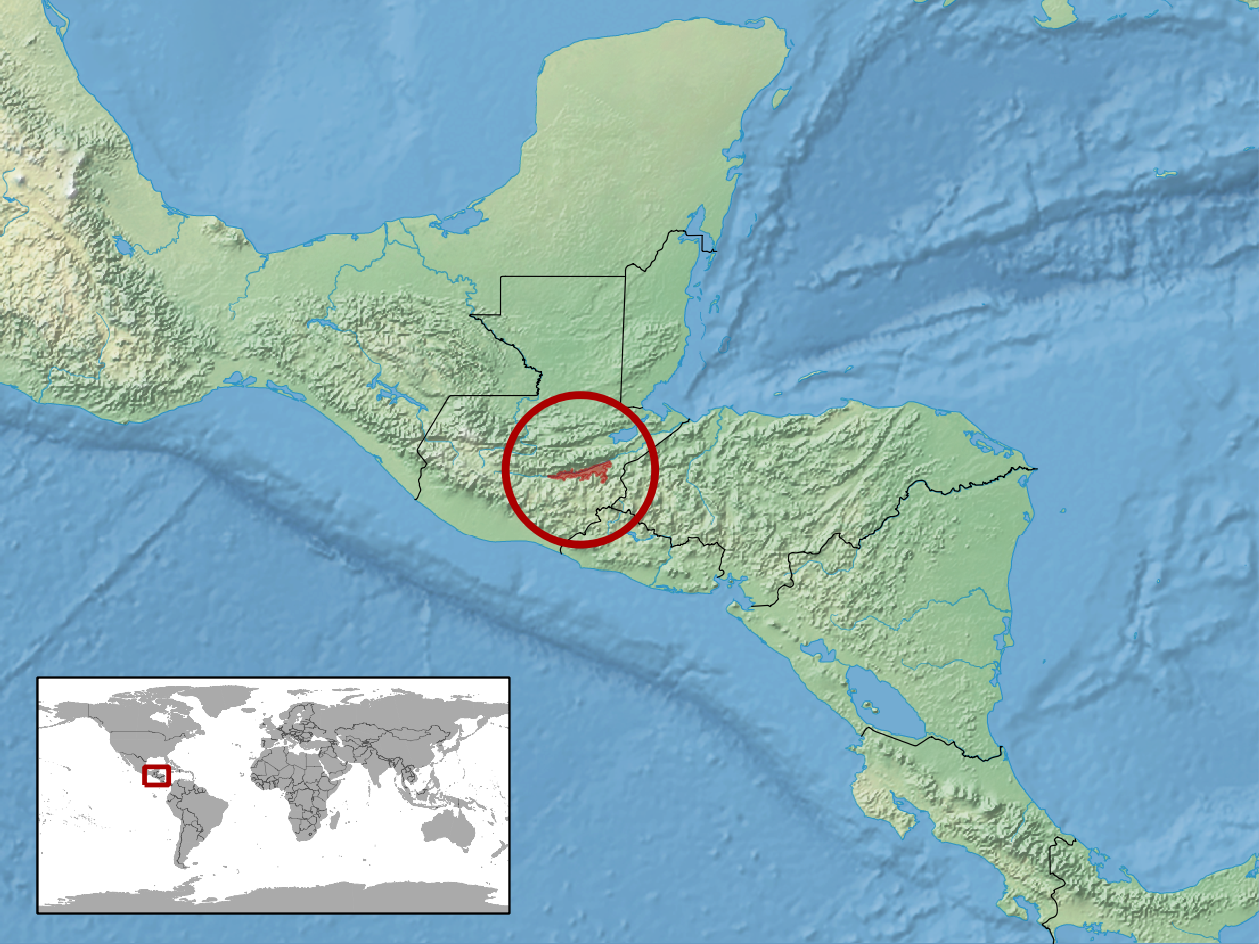

= Ctenosaura palearis =

Species of lizard

Ctenosaura palearis, commonly known as the Motagua spiny-tailed iguana, is a species of spiny-tailed iguana endemic to the Motagua Valley in Guatemala.

== Conservation status ==
This species is threatened by habitat loss and illegal trade. These iguanas were used as a source of food by natives. Its eggs are a food source for the equally threatened Motagua Valley beaded lizard (Heloderma charlesbogerti), thereby possibly linking the status of the two species. It is included in CITES appendix II so that trade of this species is regulated.

== Diet ==
The Guatemalan spiny-tailed iguana feeds on leaves and the fruits of the cactus Stenocereus pruinosus and occasionally insects (crickets, beetles, ants and wasps).

== Habitat ==
The habitat of C. palearis is characterized by a greater frequency of the cactus Stenocereus pruinosus, Albizzia idiopoda, Ximena americana and Acacia deamii. The Guatemalan spiny-tailed iguana can be regarded as a keystone species because it plays an important role in seed dispersal of S. pruinosus.
