= San Esteban Island =

Island in Sonora, Mexico

- Location within Mexico

Geography
- Location: Gulf of California
- Coordinates: 28°41′51″N 112°34′39″W

Administration
- Mexico
- State: Sonora

Demographics
- Population: Uninhabited

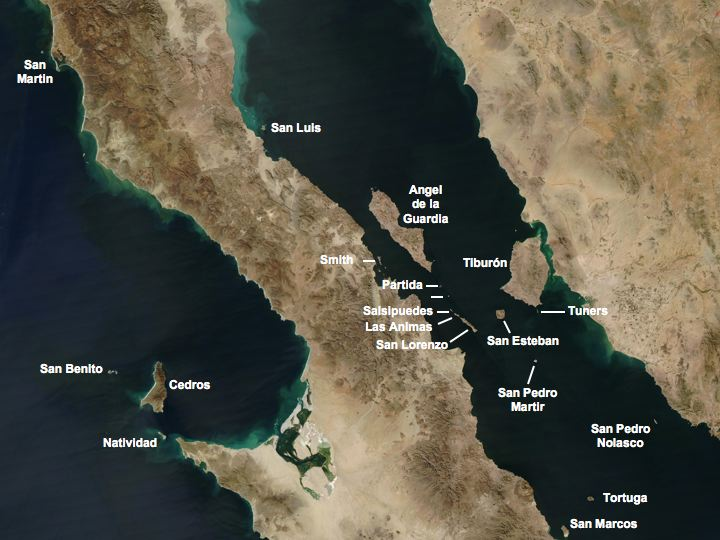
Satellite photo showing islands in the Gulf of California, with San Esteban Island just right (east) of center

San Esteban Island (Spanish: Isla San Esteban, Seri: Coftéecöl [koɸˈtɛːkʷɬ] and sometimes Hast [ʔast]) is a small island in the Gulf of California, Mexico, located to the southwest of Tiburón Island. It is part of the Hermosillo Municipality in Sonora and has a land area of 39.773 km^{2} (15.356 sq mi), the 15th-largest island in Mexico. It is located in the Gulf of California. It was once inhabited by a group of the Seri people.

San Esteban Island is home to many types of rare animal species found on only a few of the islands, such as the San Esteban chuckwalla (Sauromalus varius), the spiny chuckwalla (S. hispidus) and the spiny-tailed iguana (Ctenosaura conspicuosa).
