= Booby Cay (Bahamas) =

Island in the Bahamas

- Location within Bahamas

Geography
- Location: Atlantic Ocean
- Coordinates: 22°19′29″N 72°43′12″W
- Type: Cay
- Archipelago: Lucayan Archipelago

Administration
- Bahamas

Booby Cay is an island in the Bahamas that lies east of Mayaguana. The island is low-lying uninhabited limestone cay around 500 metres off the eastern shore of the much larger island of Mayaguana, in the far southeast of The Bahamas. It has an area of 43 hectares and a limestone and sand shore, with a brackish lake covering a fifth of its surface. It is a recognised Important Bird Area due to the breeding populations of brown boobies it hosts. It is also the only place in the world where the critically endangered Bartsch's rock iguana, a subspecies of the Turks and Caicos rock iguana, is found.

== Description ==
Booby Cay is a low-lying uninhabited limestone cay off the eastern shore of the much larger island of Mayaguana, in the far southeast of The Bahamas. The island has an area of 43 hectares. It lies within a reef that rings most of the larger island and is only divided from Mayaguana by a small 500 m wide channel. Due to the reef, the water surrounding Booby Cay are shallow, with no significant currents in the channel. The island is owned by the government and does not have any permanent human inhabitants, though visiting fishermen sometimes camp on it.

The cay's shore is mostly sand to the east and limestone to the west, although the northwestern coast is sandy. There are two seasonally variable waterbodies on the island. A brackish lake called the Big Pond covers about a fifth of the island's surface, while there are smaller central wetlands that largely vary according to the tides and rainfall. The cay has a hot, rather dry climate except when affected by hurricanes and tropical storms, which tend to occur at intervals of 2.5–3.5 years. The far southeast is covered with dense vegetation. The island's vegetation largely comprises shrubland, with some wetland plants around the water bodies.

== History ==
The island, especially its eastern end, was historically affected by overgrazing by feral goats that had been introduced on the island, with the first record of the goats being in 1988. These goats were gradually removed by local and illegal Dominican fishermen between 2008 and 2014. Although this action was not officially sanctioned, it was partially intentional, with locals having been convinced by scientists of the negative impacts of the goats removing them to conserve the island. In 2014, a feasibility study was conducted for whether black rats could be eliminated from the cay.

The island has been proposed as a National Park since 1983. It was recognised as an Important Bird Area in 2007 due to its breeding populations of brown boobies.

== Wildlife ==
The island hosts a breeding population of brown boobies, for which it is named. This population was estimated to number between 50 and 250 individuals in 2006. Besides boobies, the island is also home to flamingos and breeding ospreys. The island is also the only locality of a critically endangered subspecies of the Turks and Caicos rock iguana, Cyclura carinata bartschi. Bartsch's rock iguana was previously considered a full species and also inhabited Mayaguana, but it has since been extirpated from the main island and now only occurs on Booby Cay. The population of iguanas on the cay was estimated to be around 1,500 in 2001. The island has populations of the Bahamian endemic plant Agave inaguensis.
