= Andros Island iguana =

Conservation status
- Endangered (IUCN 3.1)

Scientific classification
- Kingdom: Animalia
- Phylum: Chordata
- Class: Reptilia
- Order: Squamata
- Suborder: Iguania
- Family: Iguanidae
- Genus: Cyclura
- Species: C. cychlura
- Subspecies: C. c. cychlura

Trinomial name
- Cyclura cychlura cychlura (Cuvier, 1829)

Subspecies of lizard

The Andros Island iguana or Andros iguana (Cyclura cychlura cychlura) is an endangered subspecies of Northern Bahamian rock iguana of the genus Cyclura that is found on Andros Island on the western edge of Grand Bahama. Its status is Endangered, with a wild population of 3,500 animals, and it can be found on the IUCN Red List.

== Taxonomy ==
The Andros Island iguana, Cyclura cychlura cychlura, is endemic to the island of Andros. It is one of three subspecies of the Northern Bahamian rock iguana; the other two subspecies being Allen's Cay iguana (Cyclura cychlura inornata) and the Exuma Island iguana (Cyclura cychlura figginsi).

== Anatomy and morphology ==
The Andros Island iguana is one of the largest species of rock iguana which attains a total length of close to 1.5 m (4 ft 11 in). Its coloration is dark-gray to black, with yellowish green or orange tinged scales on the legs, dorsal crest, and the head. When the animal matures, the yellow coloration changes to a bright reddish orange color in contrast to the animal's darker striped body and black feet.

This species, like other species of Cyclura, is sexually dimorphic; males are larger than females, and have more prominent dorsal crests as well as larger femoral pores on their thighs, which are used to release pheromones.

== Ecology ==
Andros Island iguanas are host to a reptile tick, Amblyomma dissimile.

== Diet ==
Like all Cyclura species, the Andros Island iguana is primarily herbivorous, consuming leaves, flowers, and fruits from over 100 different plant species. This diet is very rarely supplemented with insect larvae, crabs, slugs, dead birds, rats, and fungi.

== Reproduction ==
Mating occurs from early April to early May, with eggs deposited in nests excavated within termite mounds (Nasutitermes rippertii). This is the only species of iguana known to use termite mounds as a means of incubating its eggs. Females are known to guard their nests until hatching occurs.

The newly hatched iguanas disperse away from the nest site for the first two or three weeks. During the first week, the hatchlings are vulnerable to predation by snakes; less than one-third of hatchlings survive their first month.

== Conservation ==
=== Endangered status ===
It is estimated that the current global population is less than 3,500 members and is declining. The population has decreased by at least 50% over the last 60 years.

=== Causes of decline ===
Hunting is the main factor threatening imminent extinction for this iguana. It is the only Caribbean species of iguana which is still regularly hunted for food for human consumption. Feral pigs pose a threat to the iguanas, as they dig up eggs from iguana nests within termite mounds. Feral and domestic dogs prey upon juvenile and adult iguanas as well. Feral goats have also been known to compete with the iguanas for food.

As with other rock iguanas, their habitat is in rapid decline due to development and logging.

=== Recovery efforts ===
Like all Bahamian rock iguanas, this species is protected in the Bahamas under the Wild Animals Protection Act of 1968. However, no areas have been specifically designated for the protection of iguanas on Andros and no specific conservation programs are in place.

There are currently no captive breeding programs for this animal.
