= Sphaerodactylus mariguanae =

Conservation status
- Endangered (IUCN 3.1)

Scientific classification
- Kingdom: Animalia
- Phylum: Chordata
- Class: Reptilia
- Order: Squamata
- Suborder: Gekkota
- Family: Sphaerodactylidae
- Genus: Sphaerodactylus
- Species: S. mariguanae

Binomial name
- Sphaerodactylus mariguanae Cochran, 1934

Species of lizard

Sphaerodactylus mariguanae, also known as the southern Bahamas sphaero or Mayaguana least gecko, is a species of lizard in the family Sphaerodactylidae. It is endemic to The Bahamas, where it is found on Mayaguana and Booby Cay. A population, likely introduced, formerly also existed on the island of Grand Turk in the Turks and Caicos Islands, but has since been extirpated. Sphaerodactylus mariguanae is a rather small gecko for its genus, reaching a snout–vent length of 41 mm (1.6 in). It has a greyish or yellowish tan to pale brown back, marked with a complex and variable set of dark brown to black spots and stripes. It is classified by the IUCN as being endangered due to its extremely small range, ongoing habitat degradation, and the threat posed by introduced mammals.

== Taxonomy ==
Sphaerodactylus mariguanae was formally described in 1934 by the American zoologist Doris Mable Cochran based on an adult male specimen collected from Booby Cay in The Bahamas. It is named after the island on which it was discovered. It has the common names southern Bahamas sphaero, Mayaguana least gecko, and south Bahamian geckolet.

== Description ==
Sphaerodactylus mariguanae is a rather small gecko for its genus, reaching a snout–vent length of 41 mm (1.6 in). It has a greyish or yellowish tan to pale brown back, marked with a complex and variable set of dark brown to black spots and stripes. This pattern is highly variable depending on both the locality and individual observed, and can even be entirely absent in some individuals. There is little, if any, sexual dimorphism in the species, and any observable differences between sexes are far outweighed by the extent of variation between different individuals and islands.

== Distribution and habitat ==
Sphaerodactylus mariguanae is endemic to The Bahamas, where it is found on Mayaguana and Booby Cay. Over 40 specimens were collected from the island of Grand Turk in the Turks and Caicos Islands in the 1960s, a location around 115 miles distant from the type locality. However, the species' absence from any intermediate locations and the lack of further records from Grand Turk since suggests that this was an introduced population that has since died out. It traditionally inhabits arid habitats, where it hides under surface litter.

Sphaerodactylus mariguanae reproduces by laying eggs.

== Conservation ==
Sphaerodactylus mariguanae is classified by the IUCN as being endangered. Found only on two islands in close proximity, it has an extremely small range and is threatened by both ongoing habitat degradation and introduced mammals. It has survived alongside introduced predators such as rats and cats for centuries. It is also tolerant of urbanized habitats and can be seen in human settlements. However, the combination of these two factors over a long period of time has probably reduced the gecko's population density below normal levels, a population decline that is thought to be ongoing.
