= Jerome Fitzgerald =

Bahamian politician

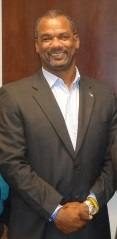

Minister of Education, Science & Technology
- In office 10 May 2012 – 22 May 2017
- Preceded by: Desmond Bannister
- Succeeded by: Jeffrey L. Lloyd

Personal details
- Born: 3 April 1966 (age 60)
- Children: Two sons and a daughter
- Education: King's College London; Cass Business School

Jerome Kennedy Fitzgerald (born 3 April 1966) is a Bahamian politician and former Cabinet Minister.

== Education ==
Fitzgerald was educated at St Andrew's School, University of London (LLM, 1989) and the Cass Business School (MSc, 1992).

== Political career ==
Fitzgerald served as a Senator from 2007 to 2012.

During his time as Senator, he denounced the dredging in the Exuma Cays Land and Sea Park at the time for Bell Island.

He was elected Member of Parliament for the Marathon constituency in 2012 and served as Minister of Education, Science & Technology from 2012 until 2017.

In 2021, he became a special advisor in the Office of the Prime Minister. After the 2026 Bahamian General Elections, he was once again appointed to the Senate and became Minister of Consumer Affairs.
