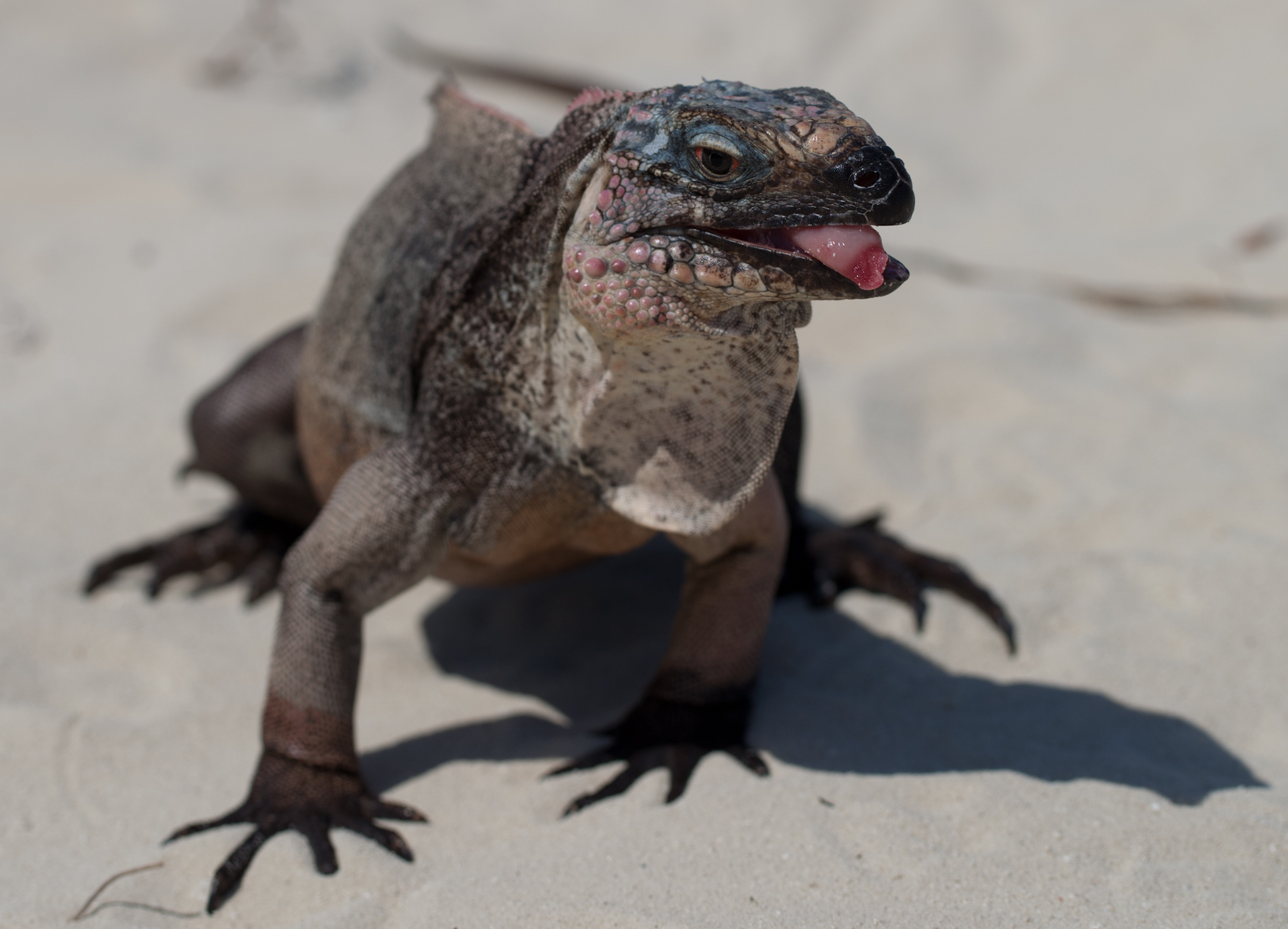

Conservation status
- Vulnerable (IUCN 3.1)
- CITES Appendix I

Scientific classification
- Kingdom: Animalia
- Phylum: Chordata
- Class: Reptilia
- Order: Squamata
- Suborder: Iguania
- Family: Iguanidae
- Genus: Cyclura
- Species: C. cychlura

Binomial name
- Cyclura cychlura (Cuvier, 1829)

Subspecies
- Cyclura cychlura cychlura; Cyclura cychlura figginsi; Cyclura cychlura inornata

Synonyms
- Iguana cychlura Cuvier, 1829; Cyclura baeolopha Cope, 1861

= Northern Bahamian rock iguana =

Species of lizard

The northern Bahamian rock iguana (Cyclura cychlura) is a species of lizard of the genus Cyclura that is found on Andros Island and the Exuma islands in the Bahamas. Its status on the IUCN Red List is vulnerable, with a wild population of less than 5,000 animals.

== Taxonomy ==
It was first described as a new species, Iguana cychlura, by Georges Cuvier in 1829.

Mitochondrial DNA analysis by biologist Catherine Malone found its closest relatives to be Cyclura nubila on Cuba, and C. lewisi on Grand Cayman. According to her C. lewisi, C. nubila and C. cychlura had diverged almost as much as each other, although she only used a single locus and a very small sample set of each species. According to a 2005 article in the magazine New Scientist C. lewisi may have diverged from C. nubila some 3 million years ago.

There are three recognised subspecies of the northern Bahamian rock iguana: the Andros Island iguana (C. cychlura cychlura), Allen's Cay iguana (C. c. inornata) and the Exuma Island iguana (C. c. figginsi). Although Malone's research found C. c. cychlura as being phylogenetically distinct from C. c. figginisi and C. c. inornata, she found these two populations were indistinct genetically and should likely be synonymised.

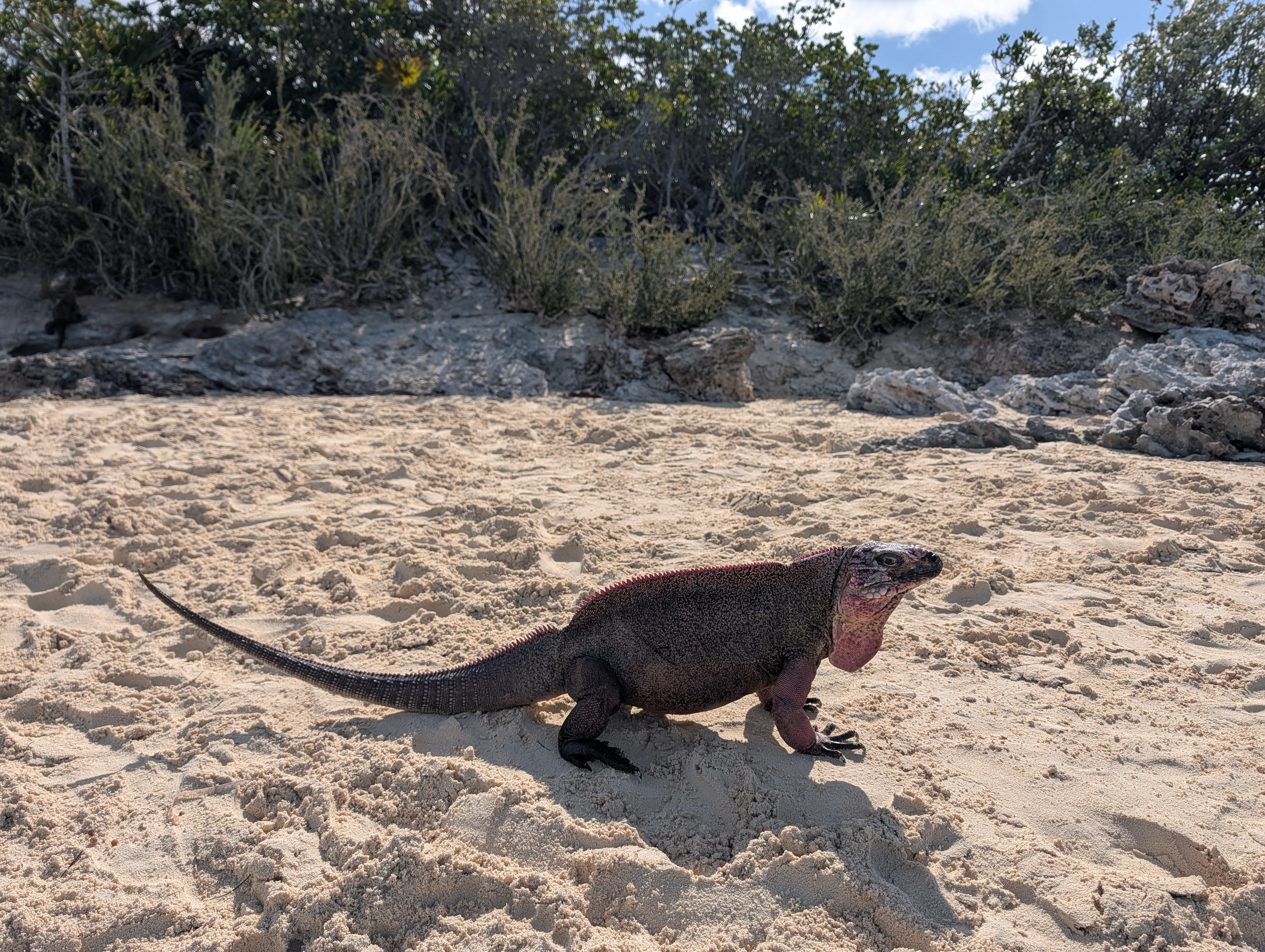
A subspecies of Northern Bahamian rock iguana, Allen's Cay Rock Iguana (Cyclura cychlura inornata), on Allen's Cay

== Description ==
This species, like other species of Cyclura, is sexually dimorphic; males are larger than females, and have more prominent femoral pores on their thighs which are used to release pheromones.

== Distribution ==
This species only occurs in the southwestern Bahamas. 18,000 years ago during the last ice age and the sea level was much lower, many of the islands of the Bahamas were connected to each other and this species probably existed in an unbroken population, the relict populations now inhabit Andros Island and the Exuma islands.

== Ecology (habitat) ==
It lives in tropical dry forest, pine barrens, coastal coppice, mangrove and beach strand habitats. These are found on low islands built from karst limestone plateaus. Like all Cyclura species, the northern Bahamian rock iguana is primarily herbivorous. It is ground-dwelling, although juveniles often climb into branches in the morning to bask and feed.

== Conservation ==
=== Status ===
In 2004 the IUCN assessed the species as a whole to be "vulnerable", although each of the three subspecies were assessed as endangered. The current global population of all three subspecies was estimated at less than 5,000 members and was thought to be declining. The population had decreased by at least 50% over the last 60 years.

=== Causes of decline ===
In 2004 the IUCN listed the main threats to this lizard depended on the islands where the different subspecies came from; with the Andros Island population to be threatened by logging, infrastructure development, feral animals and fires set for agricultural or crab-hunting reasons. The populations from the Exumas were imperilled due to feral animals (goats), fires caused by tourists, and rapid private land acquisition (primarily for tourism purposes). Development, fire and feral animals had caused a reduction in area of suitable habitat of at least 20% over the previous 30 years. Feral animals which pose a threat to the iguanas are cats, dogs, hogs and goats. Dogs prey upon juvenile and adult iguanas, hogs eat their eggs. All populations were still occasionally being hunted for meat or for the pet trade according to the IUCN in 2004. A 2002 article in the Miami Herald quoted an officer of the Bahamas' Department of Agriculture who stated iguanas were still sometimes hunted and eaten, albeit rarely.
