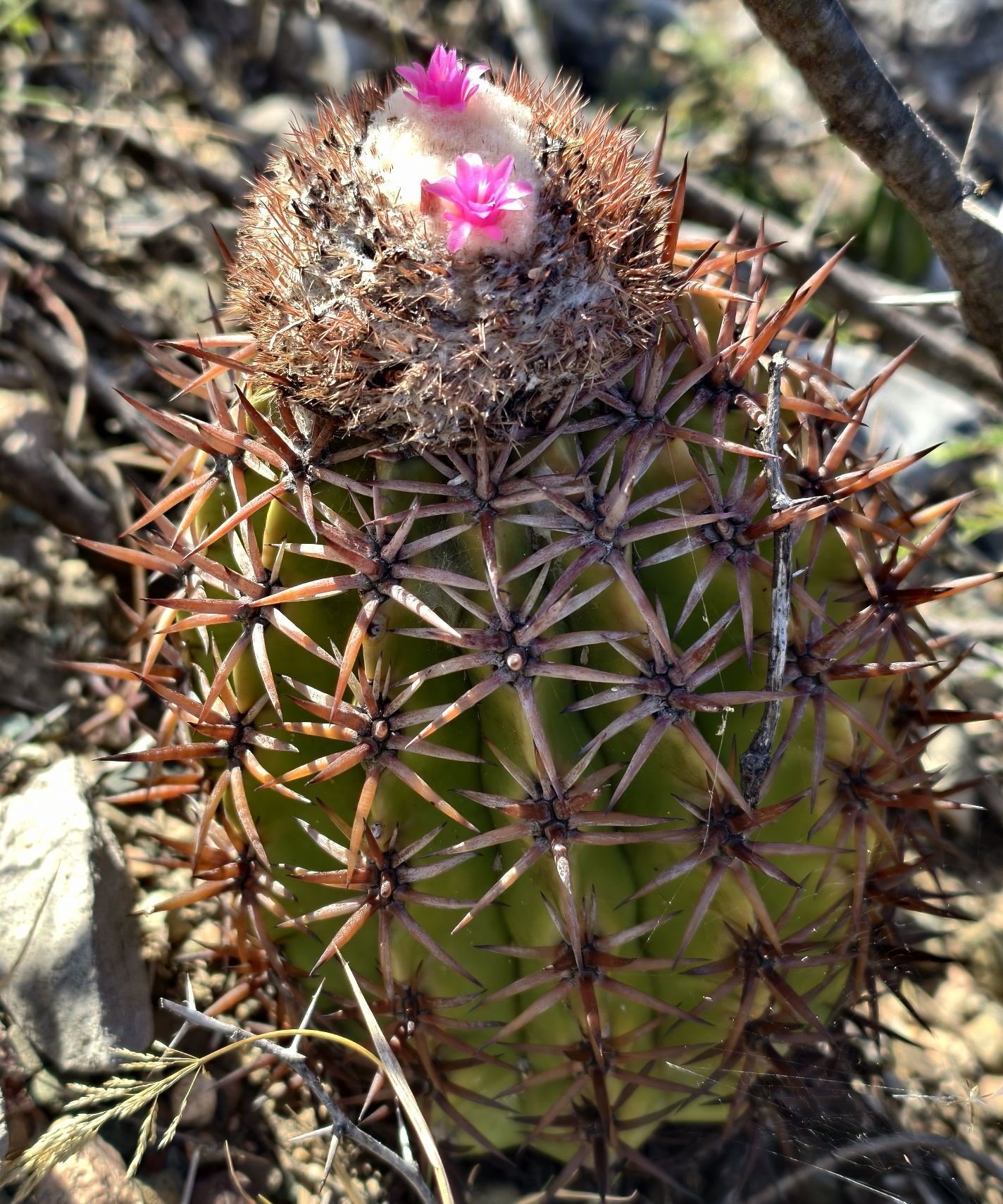

Conservation status
- Near Threatened (IUCN 3.1)

Scientific classification
- Kingdom: Plantae
- Clade: Embryophytes
- Clade: Tracheophytes
- Clade: Angiosperms
- Clade: Eudicots
- Order: Caryophyllales
- Family: Cactaceae
- Subfamily: Cactoideae
- Genus: Melocactus
- Species: M. lemairei

Binomial name
- Melocactus lemairei (Monv. ex Lem.) Miq. ex Lem.

Synonyms
- Echinocactus lemairei; Cactus lemairei; Melocactus hispaniolicus

= Melocactus lemairei =

Species of cactus endemic to Hispaniola

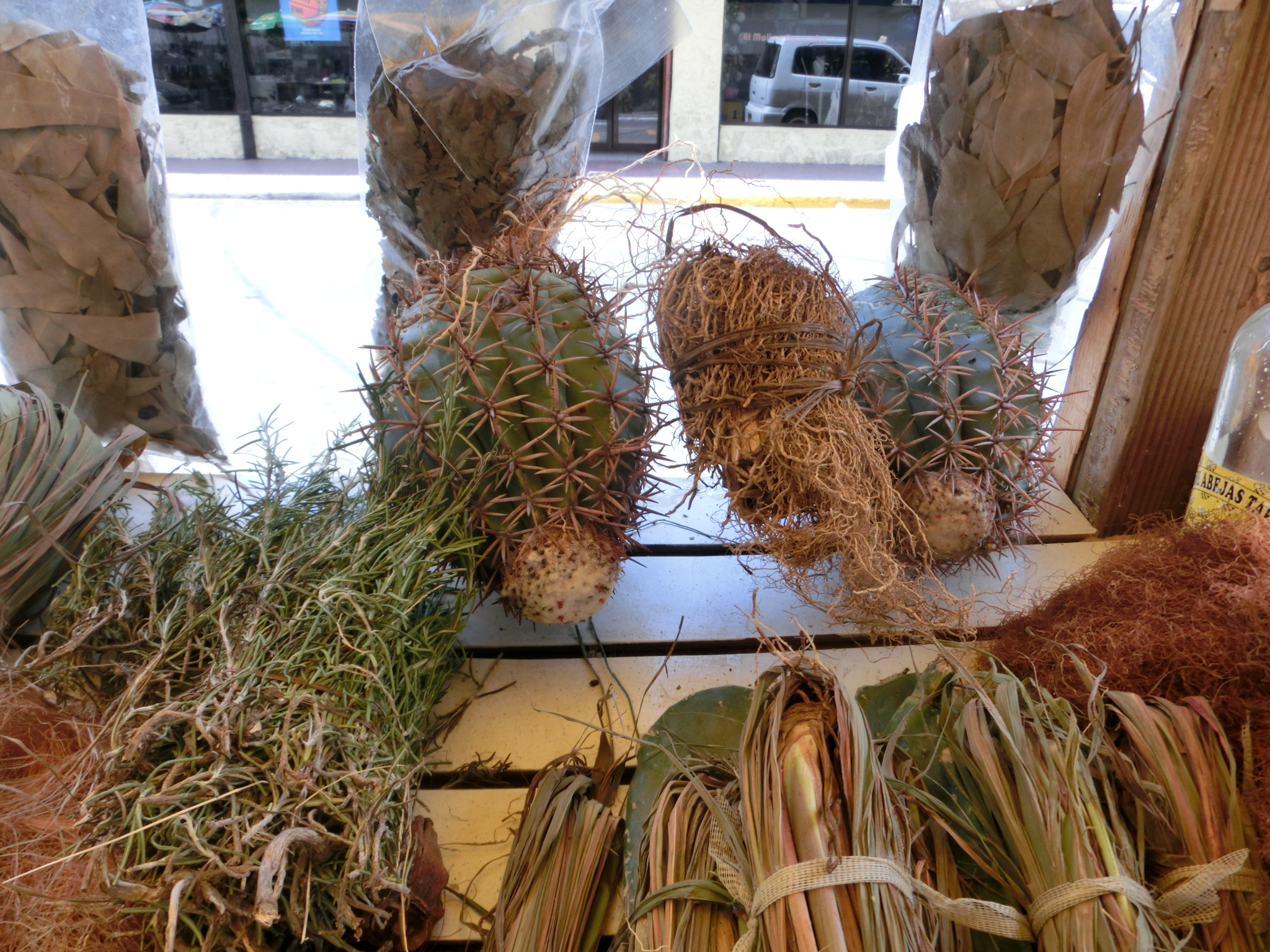
Medicinal plants on a street market in Santo Domingo, Dominican Republic (cacti pictured are Melocactus lemairei)

Melocactus lemairei is a species of cactus endemic to the Caribbean island of Hispaniola (split between the Dominican Republic and Haiti). It is named after French botanist and cactus expert Charles Antoine Lemaire.

== Taxonomy ==
Melocactus lemairei was described by M. Chevalier de Monville, Charles Antoine Lemaire, and Friedrich Anton Wilhelm Miquel, and published in L'Horticulteur Universel.

== Description ==
Melocactus lemairei is a cylindrical or slightly pyramid-shaped green cactus that can grow up to 20 cm (8 inches) in height, and 20 to 30 cm (8 to 12 inches) in diameter. It has between 9 and 10 ribs with 8 to 10 spines each. These spines are yellow to brown in color, and can reach anywhere from 2 to 3 cm (1 inch) in length. The cephalium is brown, with white wool and thornlike bristles, and grows up to 10 cm (4 inches). The flowers are pink, and grow to 2 cm long; they also have a diameter of 1.5 cm, protruding up to 1.2 cm from the cephalium. The pink fruits are up to 2 cm long.

== Distribution and habitat ==
Melocactus lemairei is endemic to Hispaniola, in the Hispaniolan dry forests ecoregion. It grows in dry, rocky soils, and also occurs in humid depressions. It can also be found on sea cliffs and rocky offshore islands. There is a notable population around Lake Enriquillo and its lake island, Isla Cabritos.

== Ecology ==
M. lemairei has been recorded to constitute some of the diet of the Ricord's iguana (Cyclura ricordii).

== Conservation ==
Melocactus lemairei is listed as Near Threatened on the IUCN Red List, due to it being found in less than 10 locations on Hispaniola, as well as being threatened by collection from the wild, and land clearing for agriculture, industry, and urban development.

Based on current knowledge of habitat degradation in Haiti, as well as it only containing one known population of this species (in and around Gonaïves), Melocactus lemairei is probably under threat in Haiti. This species is threatened by collection from the wild in the Dominican Republic; the cactus is often used as medicine and sold.
