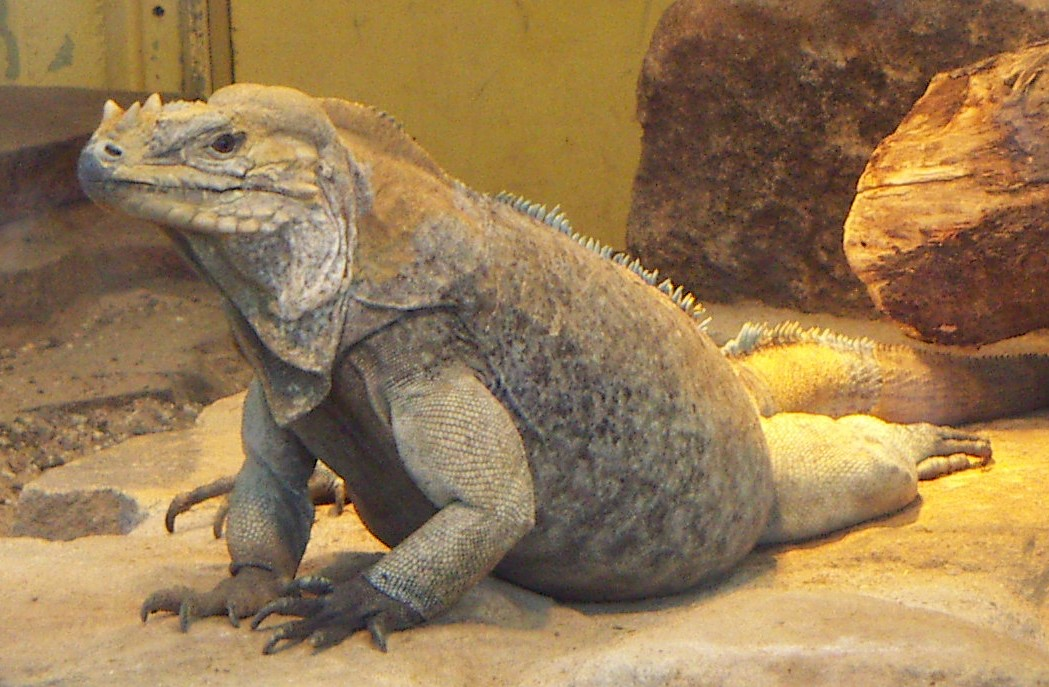
- Cyclura cornuta, rhinoceros iguana

Scientific classification
- Kingdom: Animalia
- Phylum: Chordata
- Class: Reptilia
- Order: Squamata
- Suborder: Iguania
- Family: Iguanidae
- Genus: Cyclura; Harlan, 1825

Type species
- Cyclura cornuta

= Cyclura =

Genus of lizards

Cyclura is a genus of lizards in the family Iguanidae. Member species of this genus are commonly known as "cycluras" (or more commonly as rock iguanas) and only occur on islands in the West Indies. Rock iguanas have a high degree of endemism, with (in most cases) a single species or subspecies originating on an individual island.

== Taxonomy ==
The genus Cyclura was first circumscribed by Richard Harlan in 1825 to include two new species of lizard: C. carinata and C. teres. C. teres eventually turned out to be a junior synonym of Ctenosaura acanthura.

In the 20th century there were eight recognised species of Cyclura and nine additional subspecies (one extinct) besides the nominotypical subspecies.

Recently, certain subspecies were elevated to species status. Currently, there are ten species in this genus.

Genus Cyclura – Harlan, 1825 – ten species
Common name	Scientific name and subspecies	Range	Size and ecology	IUCN status and estimated population
Turks and Caicos rock iguana	Cyclura carinata Harlan, 1825 Two subspecies: Bartsch's iguana, Cyclura carinata bartschi; Cyclura carinata carinata	Turks and Caicos islands and Booby Cay, the Bahamas	Size: Habitat: Diet:	EN
Jamaican iguana	Cyclura collei Gray, 1845	Jamaica	Size: Habitat: Diet:	CR
Rhinoceros iguana	Cyclura cornuta (Bonnaterre, 1789) Two subspecies: †Navassa Island iguana, Cyclura cornuta onchiopsis (extinct); Cyclura cornuta cornuta	Hispaniola (both Haiti and the Dominican Republic) and surrounding islands	Size: Habitat: Diet:	EN
Northern Bahamian Rock Iguana	Cyclura cychlura (Cuvier, 1829) Three subspecies: Andros Island iguana, Cyclura cychlura cychlura; Exuma Island iguana, Cyclura cychlura figginsi; Allen Cays iguana, Cyclura cychlura inornata	Andros Island and the Exuma islands in the Bahamas	Size: Habitat: Diet:	VU
Grand Cayman ground iguana, Grand Cayman blue iguana or Cayman Island rock iguana	Cyclura lewisi (C. Grant, 1940)	Grand Cayman	Size: Habitat: Diet:	EN
Cuban iguana	Cyclura nubila (Gray, 1831) Two subspecies: Cyclura nubila caymanensis; Cyclura nubila nubila	Cuba; introduced to Isla Magueyes, Puerto Rico	Size: Habitat: Diet:	VU
Anegada ground iguana	Cyclura pinguis Barbour, 1917	Anegada and Guana Island in the Virgin Islands; formerly Puerto Rico and Saint Thomas	Size: Habitat: Diet:	CR
Ricord's iguana	Cyclura ricordii (Duméril & Bibron, 1837)	Hispaniola and surrounding islands	Size: Habitat: Diet:	EN
San Salvador iguana	Cyclura rileyi Stejneger, 1903 Three subspecies: Cyclura rileyi rileyi Stejneger, 1903; Cyclura rileyi cristata Schmidt, 1920; Cyclura rileyi nuchalis Barbour & Noble, 1916	the Bahamas	Size: Habitat: Diet:	CR
Mona Island iguana	Cyclura stejnegeri Barbour & Noble, 1916	Mona Island, Puerto Rico	Size: Habitat: Diet:	CR

== Habitat ==
Rock iguanas most often inhabit subtropical zones, of Caribbean island dry forest biomes. These landscapes are characterised by rocky outcrops, rugged cliffs, hills, weather-eroded limestone features and moderate to sparse vegetation; they live in many types of environments, from moderately dry acacia forest, to much hotter mesquite and dry cactus landscapes. The reptiles enjoy sunning themselves on exposed rock faces, since they are naturally cold-blooded animals, and therefore must regulate their internal temperature. Caribbean islands are often made up of heavily weathered limestone, which ultimately forms natural caves for animals to take shelter in.

== Diet and longevity ==
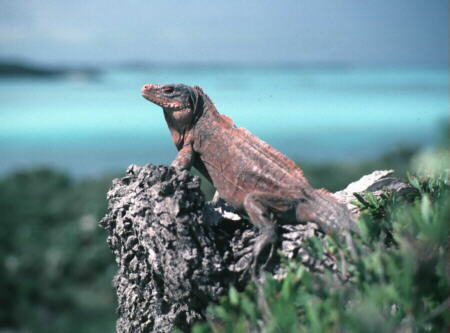
Acklin's Island iguana basking on a rock

All rock iguanas are herbivorous, consuming leaves, flowers, berries, and fruits from different plant species. Their diet is very rarely supplemented with insect larvae, crabs, slugs, dead birds, and fungi; individual animals do appear to be opportunistic carnivores.

A study in 2000 by Allison Alberts revealed that seeds passing through the digestive tracts of C. nubila nubila rock iguanas germinate more rapidly than those that do not. These seeds in the fruits consumed by this species have an adaptive advantage by sprouting before the end of very short rainy seasons. She theorised these iguanas may be an important means of distributing such seeds to new areas.

The record for the longest lived captive-born rock iguana is held by a Lesser Caymans iguana, which lived for 33 years in captivity.

A blue iguana captured on Grand Cayman in 1950 by naturalist Ira Thompson was imported to the United States in 1985 by Ramon Noegel and sold to reptile importer and breeder, Tom Crutchfield. Crutchfield loaned this iguana to the Gladys Porter Zoo in Brownsville, Texas in 1997. The lizard was named Godzilla by the zoo staff and was kept until his death in 2004. Thompson estimated the iguana to be 15 years of age at the time of its capture. This lizard may have been the word's longest-living recorded lizard at 69 years of age, having spent 54 years in captivity.

== Reproduction ==
All species of Cyclura are sexually dimorphic; males are larger than females, and have more prominent dorsal crests as well as larger femoral pores on their thighs, which are used to release pheromones.

The particulars vary slightly among species and subspecies, the rock iguanas reach sexual maturity at three to seven years of age. Females become sexually mature at two to five years of age. Males can be highly territorial with the notable exception of the Exuma Island iguana. Mating takes place at the beginning of or just prior to the first rainy season of the year (May to June) and lasts for two to three weeks. Females lay from 2 to 34 eggs, with an average clutch size of 17 within 40 days. Females of most species guard their nests for several days after laying their eggs, and incubation lasts approximately 85 days. It has been noted that Cyclura eggs are among the largest lizard eggs produced in the world.

== Conservation ==
In 1996 nine of these taxa were assessed as critically endangered, four taxa are endangered and three species have been identified as vulnerable; one subspecies is believed to be extinct. In addition to small numbers typical of endemic island-dwelling animals, wild populations of these lizards are directly and indirectly impacted by land development, overgrazing by domestic and feral livestock and predation by introduced mammals such as hogs, cats, rats, dogs, and mongooses.

In 1990, the American Zoo and Aquarium Association (AZA) designated the genus Cyclura as their highest priority. Their first project was a captive breeding program for the Grand Cayman iguana, which at the time was the most critically endangered of all the species of Cyclura.

The Indianapolis Zoo was involved in research and conservation of all sixteen taxa of West Indian iguanas. This includes collaborative work on establishing baseline biological information in captive and wild iguanas, scientific investigation, conservation efforts, field research and captive breeding programs.

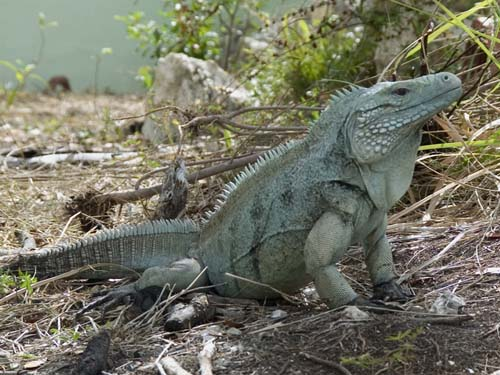
Grand Cayman blue iguana, Cyclura lewisi
