= Bell Island (The Bahamas) =

Private island in the Bahamas

Coordinates: 24°18′22″N 76°33′28″W

Bell Island is a private island inside the Exuma Cays Land and Sea Park, in the island archipelago of the Exumas, which is in turn part of the Lucayan Archipelago. As of 2021, it was a territory of The Bahamas. The island has a surface of 349 acres. Sometimes the island is called Big Bell Island, and it is not to be confused with nearby Little Bell, which is also known as Cambridge Cay.

Bell Island features a heliport and two large homes amid extensive landscaping, in addition to employee housing, etc. Three large guest cottages were renovated at a cost of $8 million, as designed by architects and interior designers of renown.

The island was purchased for $100 million in 2009 and it is controlled by the Aga Khan.

== Environment ==
In 2010, the sea bottom at Conch Cut inside the park was dredged so that the Khan's yacht could dock in the island. Senator Jerome Fitzgerald claimed 13 acres of sea bottom habitats had been destroyed. The Bahamas National Trust, which manages the Exuma Cays Land and Sea Park, defended the dredging: "We certainly do not agree with those who are calling on the government or the BNT to trap people into owning valuable and highly taxed land but not allow them reasonable access and use."

== Visitors ==
Justin Trudeau's vacation visit in December 2016 and flights on the private helicopter of Aga Khan IV raised an investigation by the Conflict of Interest and Ethics Commissioner, Mary Dawson, insofar as Canadian government ethics rules prohibit a prime minister or cabinet minister from accepting travel on a private aircraft unless prior Ethics Commission clearance is secured. The Ethics commission determined that Trudeau's or his wife and children's vacations to Bell Island in December 2014, March 2016, and December 26, 2016 to January 4, 2017, "could reasonably be seen to have been given to influence Mr. Trudeau in his capacity as prime minister." Trudeau said he was "sorry" for these violations of federal laws.

John Kerry was another island guest.
