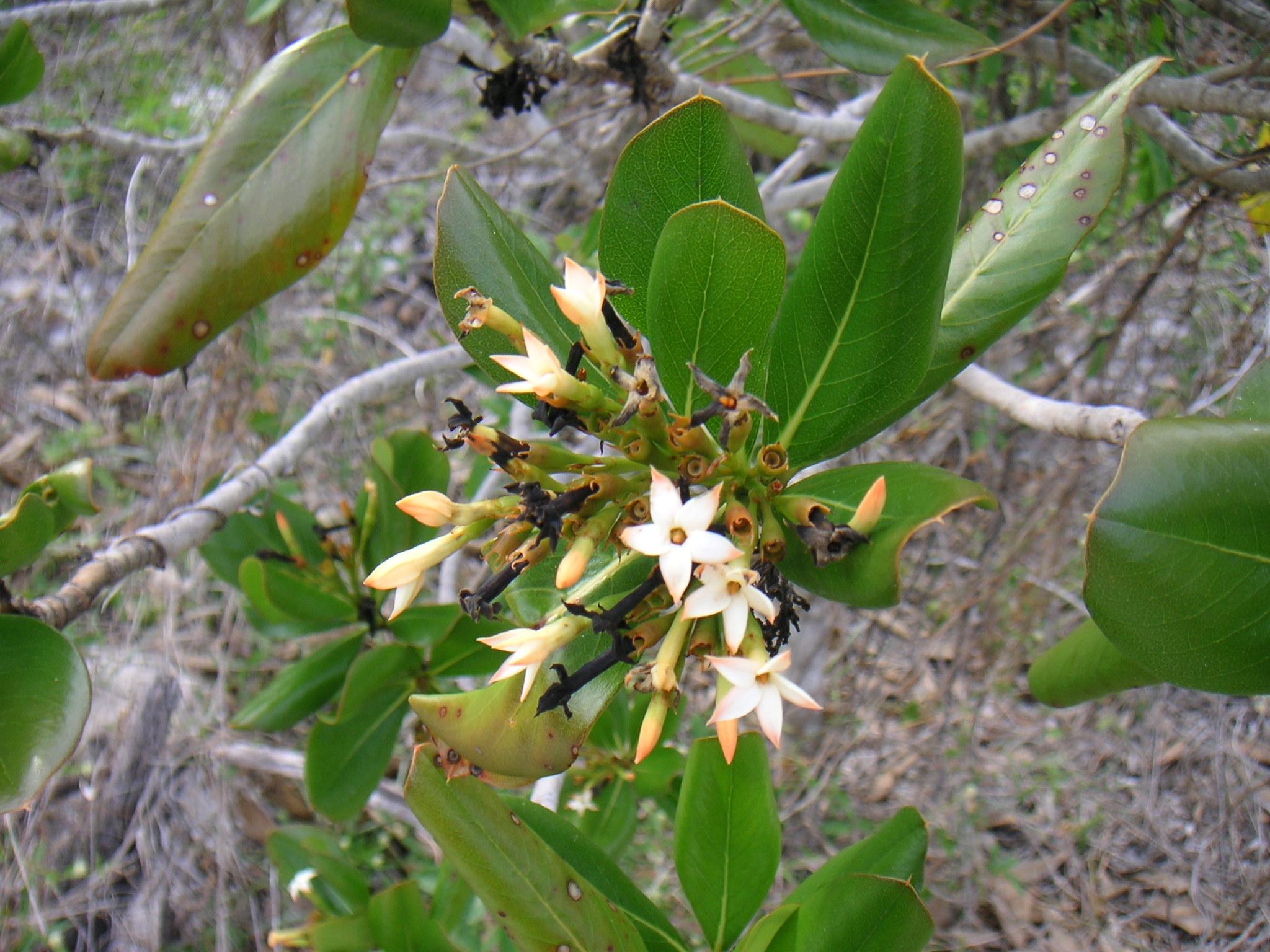
- Casasia clusiifolia

Scientific classification
- Kingdom: Plantae
- Clade: Tracheophytes
- Clade: Angiosperms
- Clade: Eudicots
- Clade: Asterids
- Order: Gentianales
- Family: Rubiaceae
- Subfamily: Ixoroideae
- Tribe: Gardenieae
- Genus: Casasia; A.Rich.

Type species
- Casasia calophylla A.Rich.

Synonyms
- Buttneria P.Browne

= Casasia =

Genus of plants

Casasia is a genus of flowering plants in the family Rubiaceae. These shrubs or small trees occur on the Caribbean islands and in one case (Seven-year Apple, C. clusiifolia) in Florida. Some of the ten accepted species were formerly placed elsewhere, e.g. in the related genip-tree genus (Genipa), in Gardenia or in Randia.

== Species ==
- Casasia acunae M.Fernández Zeq. & A.Borhidi - Cuba
- Casasia calophylla A.Rich. - Cuba
- Casasia clusiifolia (Jacq.) Urb. - Seven-year Apple
  - Casasia clusiifolia var. clusiifolia - Florida, Bermuda, Bahamas, Cuba, Turks and Caicos Islands
  - Casasia clusiifolia var. hirsuta Borhidi - Cuba
- Casasia domingensis (DC.) Urb. - Dominican Republic
- Casasia ekmanii Urb. - Haiti
- Casasia haitensis Urb. & Ekman - Haiti
- Casasia jacquinioides (Griseb.) Standl. - Cuba
- Casasia longipes Urb. - Jamaica
- Casasia nigrescens (Griseb.) C.Wright ex Rob.
  - Casasia nigrescens subsp. moaensis Borhidi and O.Muñiz - Cuba
  - Casasia nigrescens subsp. nigrescens - Cuba
- Casasia samuelssonii Urb. and Ekman - Dominican Republic
