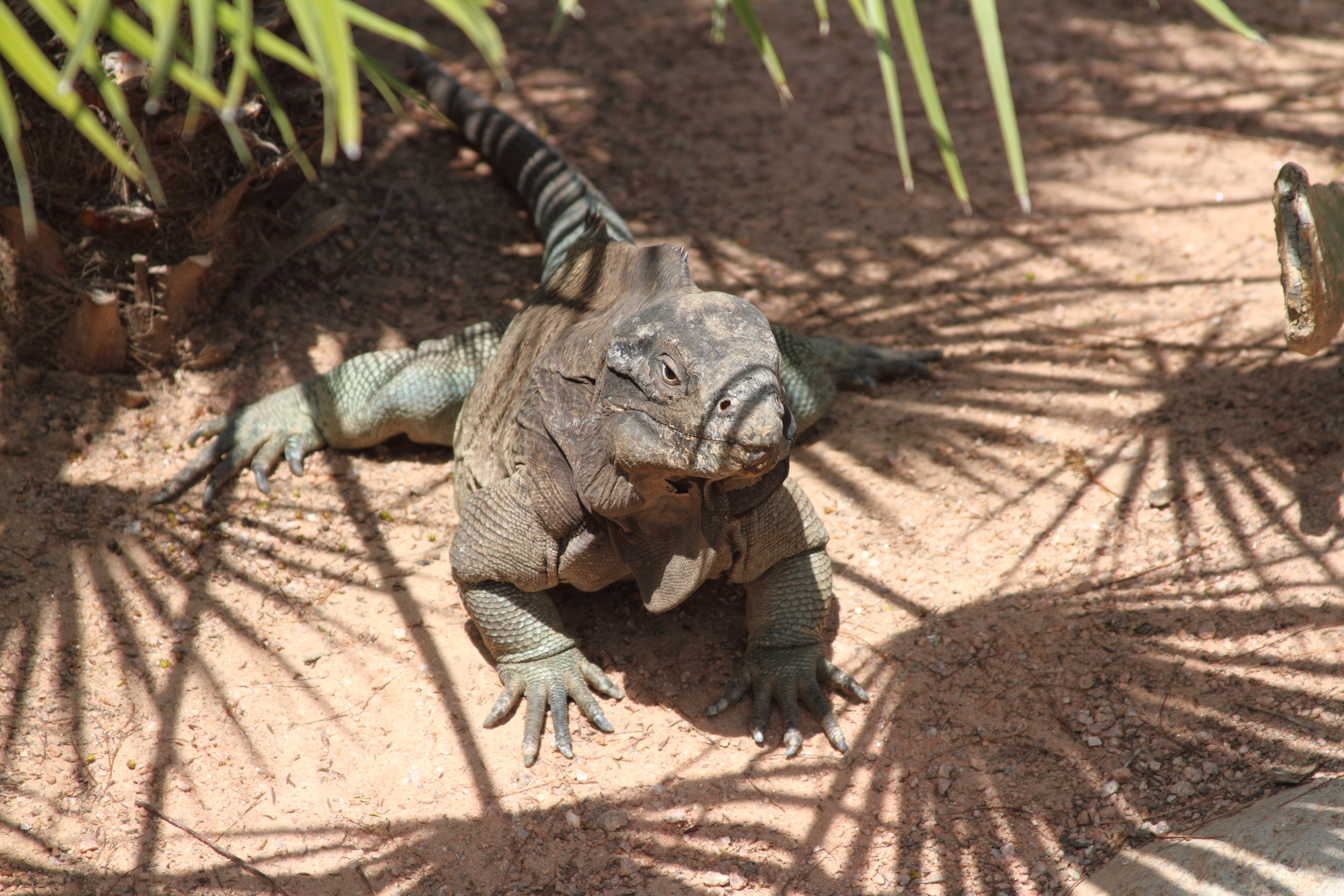
- Exuma Island iguana

Conservation status
- Critically Endangered (IUCN 3.1)

Scientific classification
- Kingdom: Animalia
- Phylum: Chordata
- Class: Reptilia
- Order: Squamata
- Suborder: Iguania
- Family: Iguanidae
- Genus: Cyclura
- Species: C. cychlura
- Subspecies: C. c. figginsi

Trinomial name
- Cyclura cychlura figginsi Barbour, 1923

Synonyms
- Cyclura figginsi Barbour, 1923

= Cyclura cychlura figginsi =

Subspecies of lizard

Cyclura cychlura figginsi, known by the common name of guana and sometimes called the Exuma Island iguana in the international literature, is a subspecies of the northern rock iguana, C. cychlura, that is found on the Exuma island chain in the Bahamas with an estimated wild population of 1,300 animals in 2004, it has been listed on the IUCN Red List as critically endangered.

== Taxonomy ==
Cyclura cychlura figginsi is a subspecies of the northern Bahamian rock iguana, Cyclura cychlura. Its subspecific name commemorates the American biologist J. D. Figgins.

In the late 19th century the American naturalist Charles Johnson Maynard mentioned that populations of iguanas still existed on the small island Bitter Guana Cay, being the namesake of the toponym, and he also mentioned that he thought it was possible this population could be named as a new species. In 1923 Thomas Barbour obliged. In 1975 Albert Schwartz and Richard Thomas subsumed it as a subspecies of C. cychlura. In their 1977 monograph on Cyclura, Schwartz and W. M. Carey explain that it is morphologically indistinguishable in squamation from other forms of C. cychlura.

== Description ==
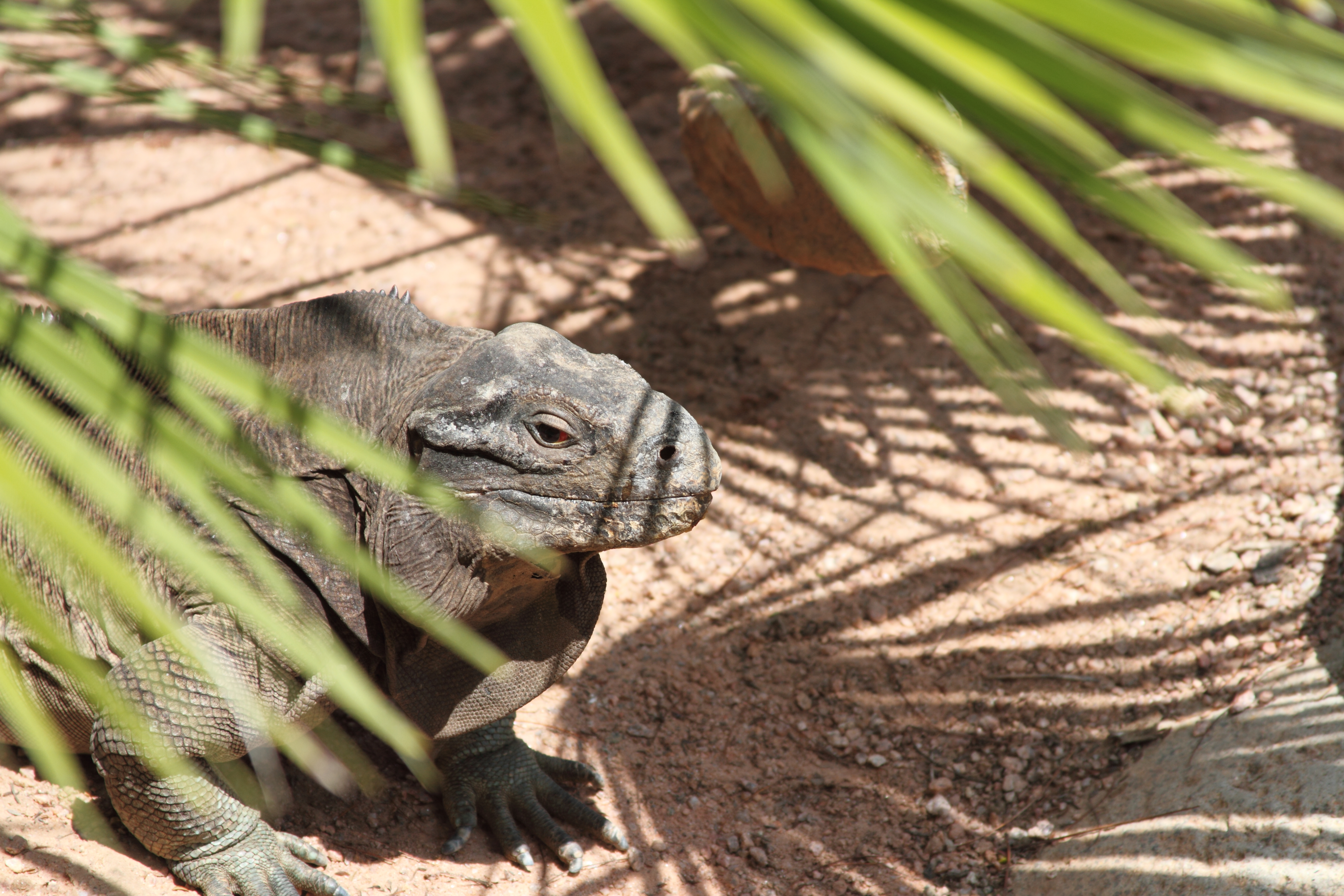
An Exuma Island iguana at the San Diego Zoo

This attains a total length of close to 1 m (3.3 ft). Its coloration is dark-gray to black, with white or orange tinged scales on the head and snout depending upon which cay the iguana is from.

This species is sexually dimorphic; males are larger than females.

== Distribution ==
Cyclura cychlura figginsi is endemic to the Exuma Cays. This subspecies is found on at least seven small cays throughout the central and southern Exuma island chain of the Bahamas: Bitter Guana Cay, Gaulin Cay, White Bay Cay, Noddy Cay, North Adderly Cay, Leaf Cay, and Guana Cay. The entire population on Leaf Cay was transferred to Pasture Cay in 2002.

== Ecology ==
=== Habitat ===
The iguana utilizes a variety of habitats from sandy beaches and xeric limestone devoid of vegetation to Bahamian dry forests. The iguanas use limestone crevices or sand burrows for retreats at night and in adverse weather conditions.

=== Behaviour ===
Exuma Island iguanas display neither territorial nor hierarchical behaviour. Adult iguanas have been observed basking in large groups without showing any signs of aggression toward one another. Carey hypothesises that this lack of a social structure allows the population to remain dense under conditions of limited resources because hierarchical social systems on small cays retard genetic variation by restricting prime nesting sites, food supplies, and retreats to a few dominant males. The longevity record in captivity for an Exuma Island iguana is twenty-three years, six months.

=== Diet ===
The Exuma Island iguana, like most Cyclura species is primarily herbivorous, consuming leaves, flowers, berries, and fruits from over 100 plant species. Favored food plants include seaside rock shrub (Rachicallis americana), darling plum (Reynosia septentrionalis), pride of big pine (Strumpfia maritima), joewood (Jacquinia keyensis), black torch (Erithalis fruticosa), seagrape (Coccoloba uvifera), silver thatch palm (Coccothrinax argentata), white stopper (Eugenia axillaris), bay cedar (Suriana maritima), and the rotting fruit of seven-year apple (Casasia clusiifolia). They actively forage for the feces of the zenaida dove (Zenaida aurita) and white-crowned pigeon (Patagioenas leucocephala).

=== Reproduction ===
Mating occurs in May, and a clutch of three eggs is usually laid in June or July, in nests excavated in the sand. Females are known to guard these nest sites until they lay their eggs, after which they abandon them.

== Conservation ==
=== Endangered status ===
The 2004 estimate of the current wild population is less than 1,300 animals, and it was said to have declined by at least 20% over the past 50 years.

=== Causes of decline ===
As with other rock iguanas, their habitat is in rapid decline due to development for tourism. In 2004 a large-scale fire possibly caused by a tourist's cigarette was reported on an iguana-inhabited island. In 1999 two Florida men were found guilty of smuggling protected reptile species into the US, including the Exuma Island iguana, Cyclura rileyi, and the Lesser Antillean iguana. Feral pigs pose a threat to the Exuma Island iguanas, as they dig up eggs from iguana nests and feral dogs prey upon juvenile and adult iguanas. Current population size is estimated at 1,300 and has declined by at least 20% over the past 50 years.

=== Recovery efforts ===
Like all Bahamian rock iguanas, this species is protected in the Bahamas under the Wild Animals Protection Act of 1968. Since 1995, Shedd Aquarium has allowed volunteers to help survey populations of Exuma Island iguanas as a form of ecotourism. Shedd maintains an in situ as well as an ex situ captive breeding program in order to breed this taxon. In 2002, Shedd Aquarium translocated sixteen iguanas to the Exuma Cays Land and Sea Park in an effort to establish the species in a protected area.

The Bahamian Government has no official captive breeding or conservation program for the Exuma Island iguana.
