= Casasia ekmanii =

Scientific classification
- Kingdom: Plantae
- Clade: Tracheophytes
- Clade: Angiosperms
- Clade: Eudicots
- Clade: Asterids
- Order: Gentianales
- Family: Rubiaceae
- Genus: Casasia
- Species: C. ekmanii

Binomial name
- Casasia ekmanii Urb.

Species of plant

Casasia ekmanii is a plant belonging to the family Rubiaceae, it is native to Haiti.
