= Casasia longipes =

Conservation status
- Near Threatened (IUCN 2.3)

Scientific classification
- Kingdom: Plantae
- Clade: Tracheophytes
- Clade: Angiosperms
- Clade: Eudicots
- Clade: Asterids
- Order: Gentianales
- Family: Rubiaceae
- Genus: Casasia
- Species: C. longipes

Binomial name
- Casasia longipes Urb.

Synonyms
- Casasia piricarpa Urb.

Species of plant

Casasia longipes is a species of plant in the family Rubiaceae. It is endemic to Jamaica.
