= Casasia haitensis =

Scientific classification
- Kingdom: Plantae
- Clade: Tracheophytes
- Clade: Angiosperms
- Clade: Eudicots
- Clade: Asterids
- Order: Gentianales
- Family: Rubiaceae
- Genus: Casasia
- Species: C. haitensis

Binomial name
- Casasia haitensis Urb. & Ekman

Species of plant

Casasia haitensis is a species of plant that is native to Haiti. It belongs to the family Rubiaceae.
