= Casasia acunae =

Scientific classification
- Kingdom: Plantae
- Clade: Tracheophytes
- Clade: Angiosperms
- Clade: Eudicots
- Clade: Asterids
- Order: Gentianales
- Family: Rubiaceae
- Genus: Casasia
- Species: C. acunae

Binomial name
- Casasia acunae M.Fernández & Borhidi

Species of plant

Casasia acunae, is a species of flowering plant belonging to the family Rubiaceae. It is native to eastern Cuba.
