= Casasia samuelssonii =

Scientific classification
- Kingdom: Plantae
- Clade: Tracheophytes
- Clade: Angiosperms
- Clade: Eudicots
- Clade: Asterids
- Order: Gentianales
- Family: Rubiaceae
- Genus: Casasia
- Species: C. samuelssonii

Binomial name
- Casasia samuelssonii Urb. & Ekman

Species of plant

Casasia samuelssonii is a plant belonging to the family Rubiaceae. It is found in the Dominican Republic.
