= Casasia nigrescens =

Scientific classification
- Kingdom: Plantae
- Clade: Tracheophytes
- Clade: Angiosperms
- Clade: Eudicots
- Clade: Asterids
- Order: Gentianales
- Family: Rubiaceae
- Genus: Casasia
- Species: C. nigrescens

Binomial name
- Casasia nigrescens (Griseb.) C.Wright ex Rob.

Species of plant

Casasia nigrescens is a species of plant belonging to the family Rubiaceae. It is endemic to Cuba.
