= Casasia domingensis =

Scientific classification
- Kingdom: Plantae
- Clade: Tracheophytes
- Clade: Angiosperms
- Clade: Eudicots
- Clade: Asterids
- Order: Gentianales
- Family: Rubiaceae
- Genus: Casasia
- Species: C. domingensis

Binomial name
- Casasia domingensis (DC.) Urb.

Species of plant

Casasia domingensis is a plant native to the Dominican Republic, it is a part of the family Rubiaceae.

== Etymology ==
The species has been given the specific epithet "domingensis", as it occurs on the island of Hispaniola. This island was historically called Santo Domingo, or Saint-Domingue.
