= Casasia jacquinioides =

Scientific classification
- Kingdom: Plantae
- Clade: Tracheophytes
- Clade: Angiosperms
- Clade: Eudicots
- Clade: Asterids
- Order: Gentianales
- Family: Rubiaceae
- Genus: Casasia
- Species: C. jacquinioides

Binomial name
- Casasia jacquinioides (Griseb.) Standl.

Synonyms
- Alibertia jacquinioides Griseb.; Amaioua jacquinoides (Griseb.) M.Gómez; Cordiera jacquiniodes (Griseb.) Kuntze; Casasia parvifolia Britton

Species of plant

Casasia jacquinioides is a species of plant belonging to the family Rubiaceae. It is endemic to Cuba.
