= Cyclura carinata bartschi =

Conservation status
- Critically Endangered (IUCN 3.1)

Scientific classification
- Kingdom: Animalia
- Phylum: Chordata
- Class: Reptilia
- Order: Squamata
- Suborder: Iguania
- Family: Iguanidae
- Genus: Cyclura
- Species: C. carinata
- Subspecies: C. c. bartschi

Trinomial name
- Cyclura carinata bartschi Cochran, 1931

Subspecies of lizard

Cyclura carinata bartschi, commonly known as Bartsch's iguana or the Booby Cay iguana, is a subspecies of lizard in the family Iguanidae. The subspecies is endemic to a single cay, Booby Cay, in The Bahamas .

== Taxonomy ==
Bartsch's iguana, Cyclura carinata bartschi, was first described by American herpetologist Doris M. Cochran in 1931. It has some minor morphological characteristics which differ from the Turks and Caicos rock iguana, Cyclura carinata.

Its specific name, carinata, means "keeled" and refers to the animal's scalation. Its subspecific name, bartschi, was given in honor of Silesian-American zoologist Paul Bartsch.

Further phylogenic study of mtDNA haplotypes by scientists at Utah Valley State College in 2007, determined that this animal should not be considered a valid subspecies merely upon population isolation and slight morphological differences, but rather that it is genetically, very similar to the Turks and Caicos rock iguana (Cyclura carinata) and that subspecies status should be revoked to include this population in conservation and intra-species breeding. Morphological and genetic data indicate that the closest living relative of C. carinata is C. ricordi of Hispaniola.

== Anatomy and morphology ==
Measuring less than 770 mm (30 in) in total length (tail included) when full grown, Bartsch's iguana, like its parent species, the Turks and Caicos rock iguana, is one of the smaller species of Cyclura. Bartsch's iguana is greenish to brownish-gray, with a yellow dorsal crest, faint yellow-brown reticulations on the bodies of the adults, and a golden iris.

Like other members of the genus Cyclura, males of this species have larger femoral pores on their thighs, which are used to release pheromones. Females have smaller pores, making the animals sexually dimorphic.

== Habitat and distribution ==
Bartsch's iguana is found only on Booby Cay in the Bahamas. It is estimated that 1,000 of these iguanas live on this small cay and their population appears to be stable, despite the small number. It is rumored that this subspecies once lived on the larger island of Mayaguana and was referred to as the Mayaguana iguana.

== Diet ==
Like all Cyclura species, Bartsch's iguana is primarily herbivorous, consuming leaves, flowers, and fruits from different plant species. This diet is very rarely supplemented with insects, mollusks, crustaceans, arachnids, lizards, and carrion.

== Conservation ==
The Bahamas National Trust has proposed to the Bahamas Government that Booby Cay, which also is a significant area for nesting seabirds, be protected under the national parks system. A program to remove feral goats from the cay has also been initiated. It has been noted that "Australian pine" trees (Casuarina equisetifolia) introduced by man to the cay may pose a problem as the needles are inedible and their tall size prevents native plants, which Bartsch's iguana relies on for food, from growing.

In 1998 a colony of Bartsch's iguana was established on Mayaguana. This population appears to be stable despite the presence of feral goats on the island.
