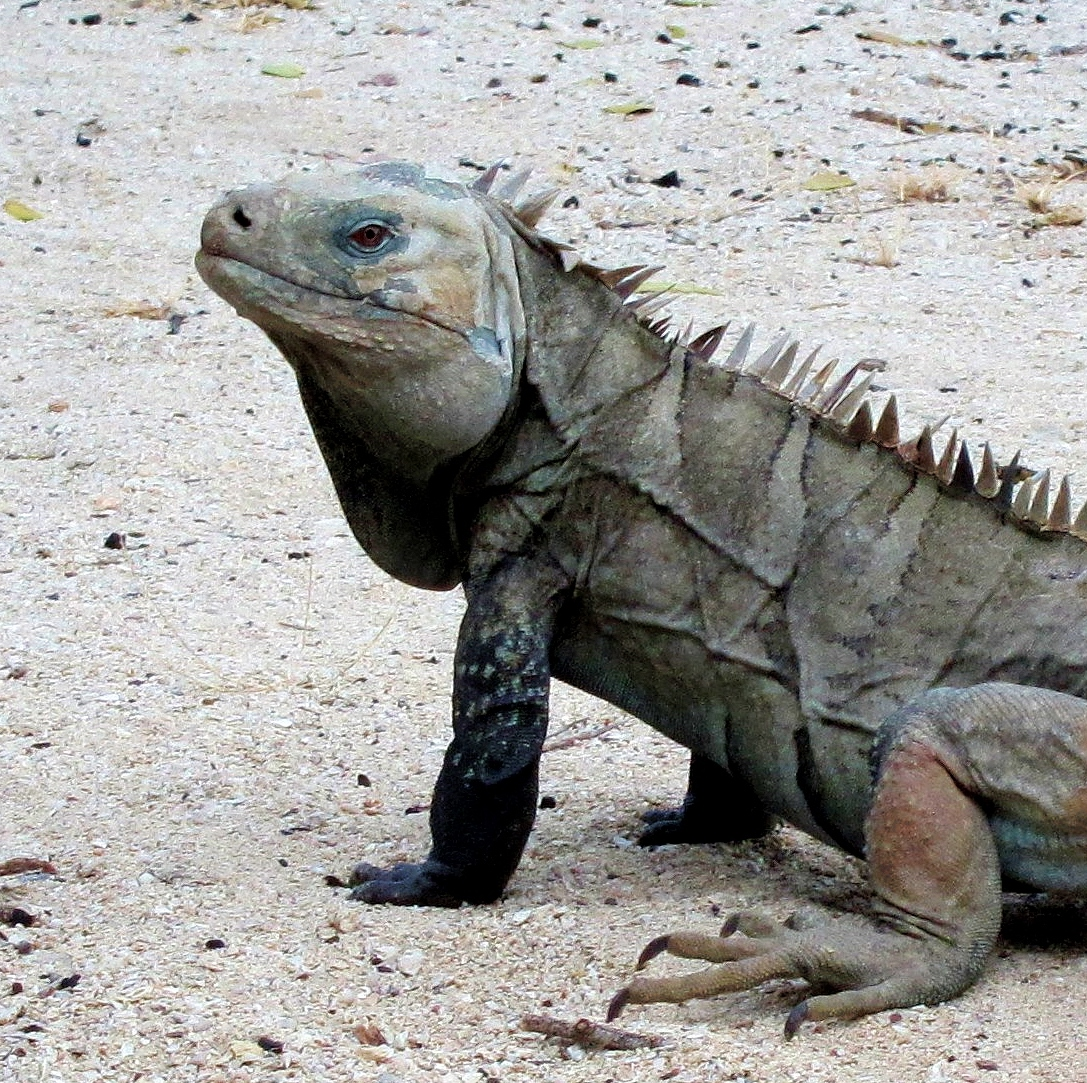
- C. ricordii at Lake Enriquillo, Dominican Republic

Conservation status
- Endangered (IUCN 3.1)
- CITES Appendix I

Scientific classification
- Kingdom: Animalia
- Phylum: Chordata
- Class: Reptilia
- Order: Squamata
- Suborder: Iguania
- Family: Iguanidae
- Genus: Cyclura
- Species: C. ricordii

Binomial name
- Cyclura ricordii (Duméril & Bibron, 1837)

Synonyms
- Aloponotus ricordii Duméril & Bibron, 1837; Hypsilophus ricordii (Duméril & Bibron, 1837) Fitzinger, 1843; Cyclura ricordi (Duméril & Bibron, 1837) Schwartz & R. Thomas, 1975, lapsus

= Cyclura ricordii =

Species of iguana endemic to Hispaniola

Cyclura ricordii, also known as Ricord's ground iguana or Ricord's rock iguana, is an endangered species of medium-sized rock iguana, a large herbivorous lizard. It is endemic to the island of Hispaniola (in both Haiti and the Dominican Republic). It is known to coexist with the nominate subspecies of the rhinoceros iguana (C. cornuta cornuta); the two species are the only taxa of rock iguana to do so. The natural habitats of its three subpopulations are hot, dry, wooded savanna on limestone with access to soil and sandy flats in southern Hispaniola. It is threatened by predation by introduced predators and habitat loss, due to overgrazing and charcoal manufacture.

== Taxonomy ==
The specific epithet ricordii commemorates the French doctor Alexandre Ricord who sent the first specimen to Paris.

In 1837 Cyclura ricordii was described as a species new to science by André Marie Constant Duméril and Gabriel Bibron, who at that time named it Aloponotus ricordii. In 1843, the species was assigned to the genus Hypsilophus by Leopold Fitzinger. In 1885, the species was returned to the genus Aloponotus by Edward Drinker Cope. In 1924, the species was assigned to the genus Cyclura by Doris Mable Cochran. Cochran used the spelling C. ricordii, but in 1975 Albert Schwartz and Richard Thomas misspelled the name as C. ricordi, this orthographic error was subsequently followed by most authors and databases, until the 2010s.

The holotype is a stuffed animal sent by Ricord from the colony of Saint-Domingue to Paris, which arrived at the Muséum national d'histoire naturelle in 1699, and is stored there under the collection number MNHN-RA-0.8304.

Genetic (mtDNA) and morphological data indicate that the closest living relative of C. ricordii is C. carinata of the Turks and Caicos Islands.

== Common names ==
In English, vernacular names of C. ricordii include Ricord's rock iguana, Ricord's ground iguana, Ricord's iguana, and banded rock iguana.

Vernacular names in Spanish include iguana amarilla and iguana de Ricord. In the local Haitian Creole, it is known as leza recò. In French, the names cyclure d'Hispaniola, cyclures de Ricord and iguane de Ricord are recorded.

== Description ==
Cyclura ricordii is a species of rock iguana with a maximum snout-to-vent length in males of 460 mm (18 in), in females to 430 mm (17 in), The tail is 540 mm (21 in) long at maximum. The average snout-to-vent length at birth is 96 mm (3.8 in) with a 147 mm (5.8 in) tail.

Their body color is a grayish green flat color marked by five to six bold pale gray chevrons alternating with dark gray to black chevrons. In adults, the dark chevrons are less contrasting than in juveniles. The eyes have a dark, almost black iris and red sclera.

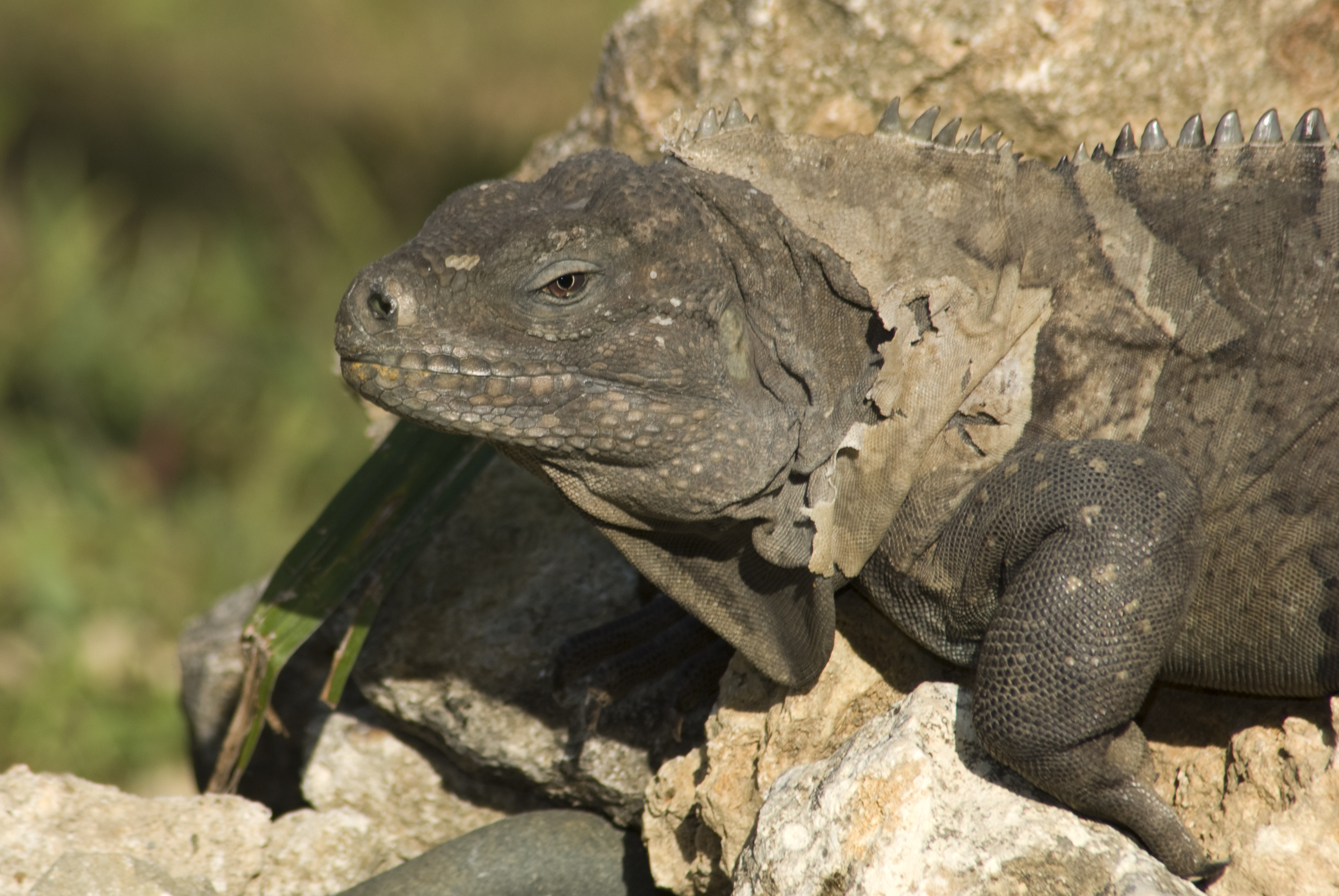
C. ricordii

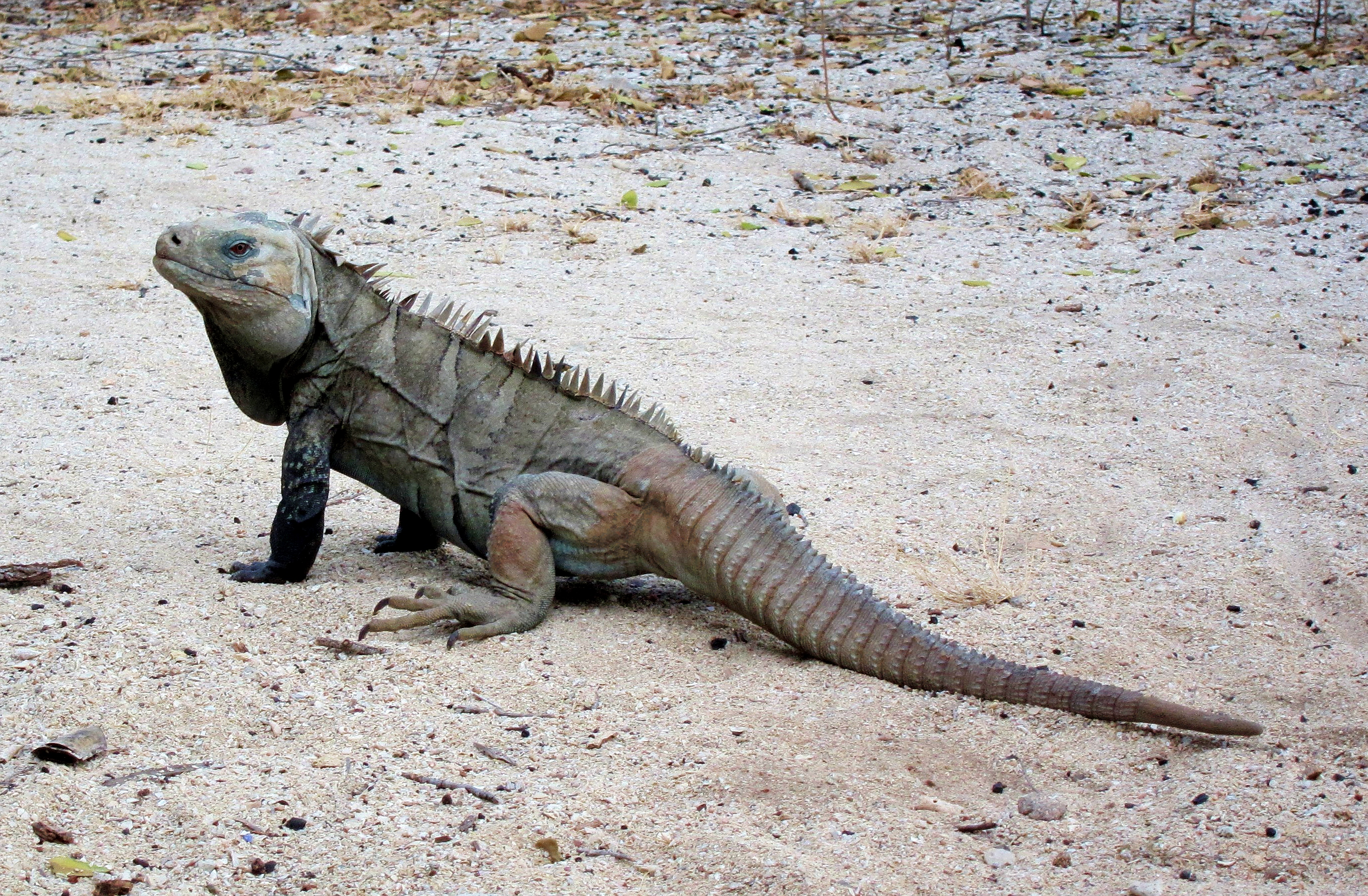
C. ricordii, Cabritos Island

Species of Cyclura are sexually dimorphic; males are larger than females, and have larger femoral pores on their thighs, which are used to release pheromones.

Eggs from the genus Cyclura are some of the largest laid by any lizard.

== Distribution ==
Until 2008, Cyclura ricordii was thought to be restricted to two populations in the southern Dominican Republic: one population in the arid Hoya de Enriquillo surrounding the hypersaline Lake Enriquillo and its lake island Isla Cabritos, and the other in the most xeric portion of the coastal lowlands of Pedernales Province. These are separated by the moister Sierra de Bahoruco, with three peaks exceeding 2,000 metres (6,600 ft) which form an ecological barrier between two populations. Past drier Pleistocene climates may have allowed genetic exchange between the two populations. It is sympatric throughout its range with C. cornuta, the rhinoceros iguana. All other Caribbean islands with rock iguanas are home to a single species. In 2008, a third population was found to exist near the town of Anse-a-Pitres in Haiti, near the southernmost coast.

Hispaniola was once two islands; genetic evidence indicates C. ricordii evolved on the northern island and later dispersed southwards, while C. cornuta evolved on the southern island.

== Ecology ==
=== Habitat ===
This species inhabits dry xeric Hispaniolan dry forests or scrublands with scattered trees, cacti and many vines, that grow on rocky limestone cliffs and terraces, with the occasional depressions filled with red soil. Another part of the population inhabits a flat habitat with a 5–6m tall dry forest, dominated by succulents growing on white sandy soil. It is found at altitudes from 43m below sea level (Cabritos Island on Lake Enriquillo) up to 439m. The Haitian population is found on a small karst limestone terrace near the coast.

=== Behaviour ===
It is a diurnal animal, sleeping in "retreats" during the nights. They usually excavate burrows for retreats in the sandy areas of either type of habitat which they expand over time. Entrances to these retreats are generally dug under dense thorny vegetation, shrubs, stumps, or exposed rocks. They may sometimes also retreat to hollow tree trunks or rock crevices.

Mating occurs from May through June. In the genus Cyclura in general, in many species copulation is preceded by numerous head-bobs on the part of the male, who then circles around behind the female and grasps the nape of her neck in order to manoeuvre his tail under hers to position himself for sex. Nest sites are built in clay or sand, in pockets of earth exposed to the sun. The Haiti population nests in a single location on a sandy beach at the coast. Anywhere from 2 to 23 eggs are usually laid in May to July, depending on the size and age of the female. The eggs go through a 95- to 100-day incubation period before hatching in July to September The average success rate is 95%. After two to three years both sexes have reached maturity.

The adults of the species are primarily terrestrial whereas juveniles tend to occupy arboreal retreats. It has been observed swimming and floating in Lago Enriquillo.

=== Diet ===
It feeds on a wide variety of plants and plant parts, depending on local availability, including Consolea, Cordia, Croton, Guaiacum, Melocactus lemairei, Opuntia and Prosopis. Insects and crustaceans are also sometimes eaten when the opportunity presents itself, as well as vertebrates.

== Conservation ==
In 1970, the estimated wild population was 5,000 lizards. In 1996, the estimated wild population was 2,000-4,000 animals. In 2018 the IUCN assessed wild population as 3,000-4,000 animals. The authors of that assessment found the population trend to be decreasing.

The two populations are partially found within the following protected areas:

- Jaragua National Park, Pedernales Province, Dominican Republic.
- Parque Nacional Lago Enriquillo e Isla Cabritos, Bahoruco Province, Dominican Republic.

The Indianapolis Zoo has been involved in the Dominican Republic since the mid-1990s. As of 1995, it was successful with breeding this species, but rearing the young had not gone well. The Parque Zoológico Nacional in Santo Domingo had similar success, but had "institutional problems" according to Ottenwalder. In 2005 the Parque Zoológico Nacional was breeding the iguanas. As of 2009, Grupo Jaragua was the only Dominican non-governmental organisation focussed on the conservation of amphibians and reptiles. It was quite active domestically. In 2018 Grupo Jaragua was still actively monitoring the population.

=== Threats ===
In 1995, Ottenwalder mentioned that in the 1970s, Chinese restaurants in the capital city Santo Domingo sometimes sold iguana meat from this species as a special treat, although this was not going on in his time. According to Grupo Jaragua, the Ricord's iguana population in Pedernales Province has been threatened by agricultural displacement through increased cattle grazing, as well as charcoal mining. They state the iguanas are hunted and trapped as a food source by humans, and killed by goatherders under the false superstition that iguanas rip open the bellies of livestock with their pointed crests. Competition from domestic and feral livestock is also a concern, as is predation of juveniles by cats, dogs, and mongooses.

=== Status ===
The IUCN initially assessed this species' conservation status as critically endangered in 1996 (it had been listed as undetermined before then), but after the Haitian subpopulation was discovered, the "area of occupancy" had increased and it was downlisted to endangered in the assessment in 2018. It has been listed in Appendix I of the CITES treaty, at least since the 1990s, and this appears to have been effective. It is not listed under the US Endangered Species Act.
