= Exuma Cays Land and Sea Park =

National park in the Bahamas

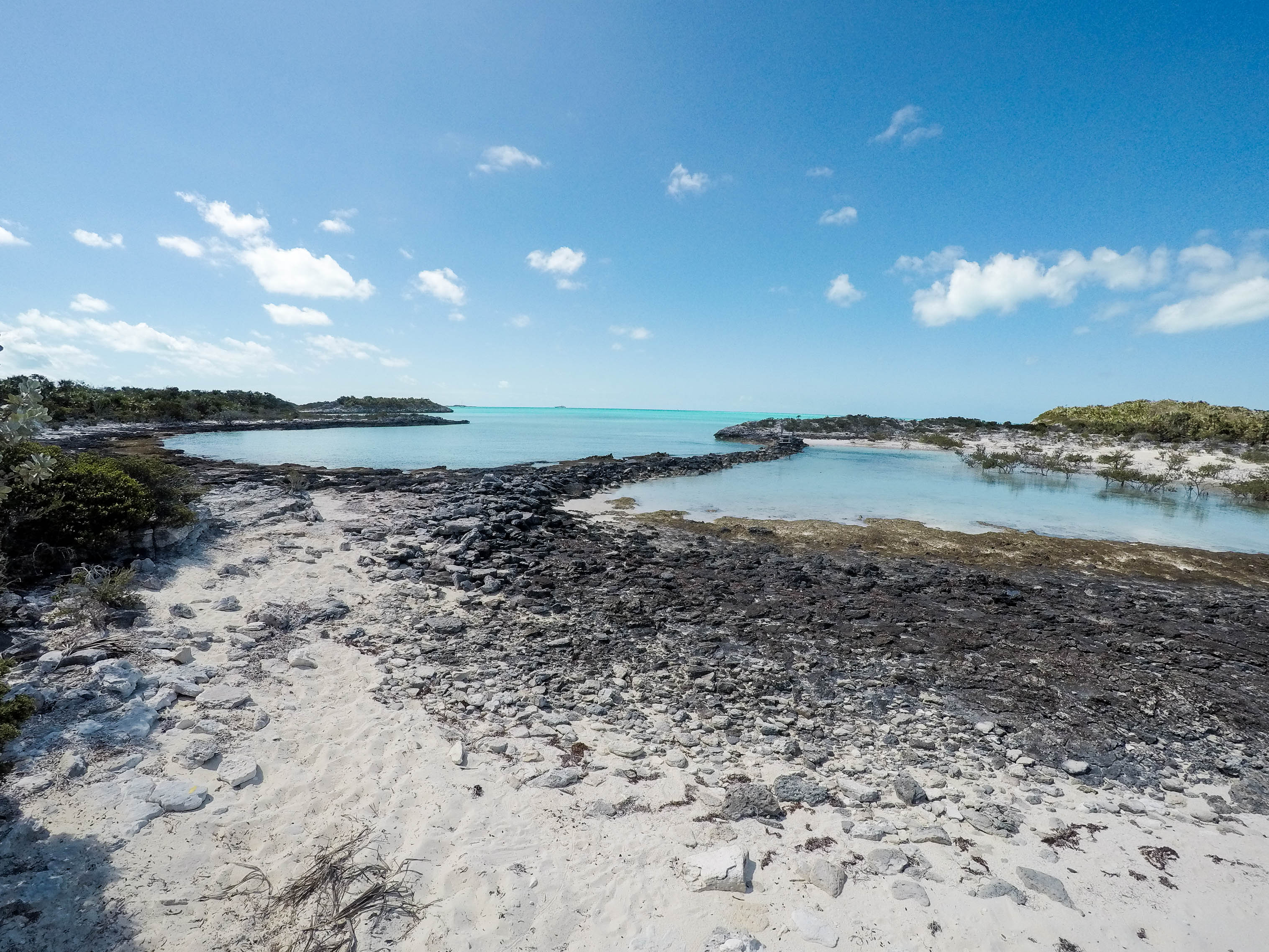

- Location within Bahamas
- Location: Exuma, the Bahamas
- Coordinates: 24.42°N 76.69°W
- Area: 112,640 acres (45,584 ha)
- Established: 1959
- Governing body: Bahamas National Trust
- Website: bnt.bs/explore/exuma/exuma-cays-land-sea-park/

The Exuma Cays Land and Sea Park is a protected area in the Exuma Cays of the Bahamas. The protected area extends from Shroud Cay in the north to Bell Cay in the south. The vegetation consists of mangrove communities, with the east sides being clad in low scrub and the western sides with taller scrub. There are many epiphytic orchids and bromeliads.

== History ==
In 1953, Daniel Beard, a superintendent of Everglades National Park, proposed setting aside part of the Exuma Cays as a park. His idea was received enthusiastically, received support from the Nassau newspapers. In 1955 a formal proposal was submitted and on February 13, 1956 the Governor of the Bahamas confirmed that 22 miles of Exumas had been set aside providing some organization would undertake to give concrete recommendations to the Bahmamian Government. This organization would also be responsible for financial support of the park. Carleton Ray, an assistant director of the New York Aquarium and Jack Gabow headed up a survey of the Exuma Cays. They asked for and received a one-year extension. It was recommended that the Bahamas National Trust be established to oversee the proposed park. The Exuma Cays Land and Sea Park was finally established in 1958 with the Bahamas National Trust overseeing it.

== Park headquarters ==
The Exuma Cays Land and Sea Park's headquarters are on the island of Warderick Wells. The island is a popular spot for cruising sailboats and yachts to stop and spend the night in one of three anchorages. There are several nature trails on the island, including one to Boo Boo Hill that offers views of the island, anchorage and Exuma Sound.

A cruiser's custom is to leave a driftwood sign with your boat's name at the top of Boo Boo Hill.

Services are extremely limited at the park. There is a small store that sells sodas, candy bars, and ice, rents videos, and collects mooring and anchoring fees, but that is it. There are no public restrooms, trash cans, or wi-fi service. (The internet service that had been available in the North Mooring Field for a fee has been discontinued.) If a person has a BTC phone - or other provider with an international plan - the best option for cell coverage is to stand at the top of the headquarter stairs and face Staniel Cay. One to three bars of service connection may be available.

== Fauna ==
The rare Bahamian hutia is the only terrestrial mammal native to the Bahamas, and was introduced into the park in 1973. There are a number of seabirds that nest in the park, including Sargasso shearwater, white-tailed tropicbird, brown noddy and six species of terns (bridled, least, roseate, royal, sandwich and sooty). The endangered Allen Cays rock iguana (Cyclura cychlura inornata) is found on several islands in the Exumas. The coral reefs, marine invertebrates and many species of fish are also noteworthy.

Overfishing has caused many commercial species to show large declines, but the Exuma Land and Sea Park still has a healthy breeding population of conch, grouper and lobster. In 1985, the Bahamas National Trust took a bold conservation stance: the Exuma Park was made a protected replenishment zone. All fishing is prohibited within the boundaries of the park. Ospreys (Pandion haliaetus), also known as fishhawks, are the only creatures allowed to fish in the park. The benefits of this initiative are far-reaching. There is evidence that more marine species are reaching adulthood and are restocking areas outside the park boundaries.

== See also ==
- Bell Island, and island inside the park
