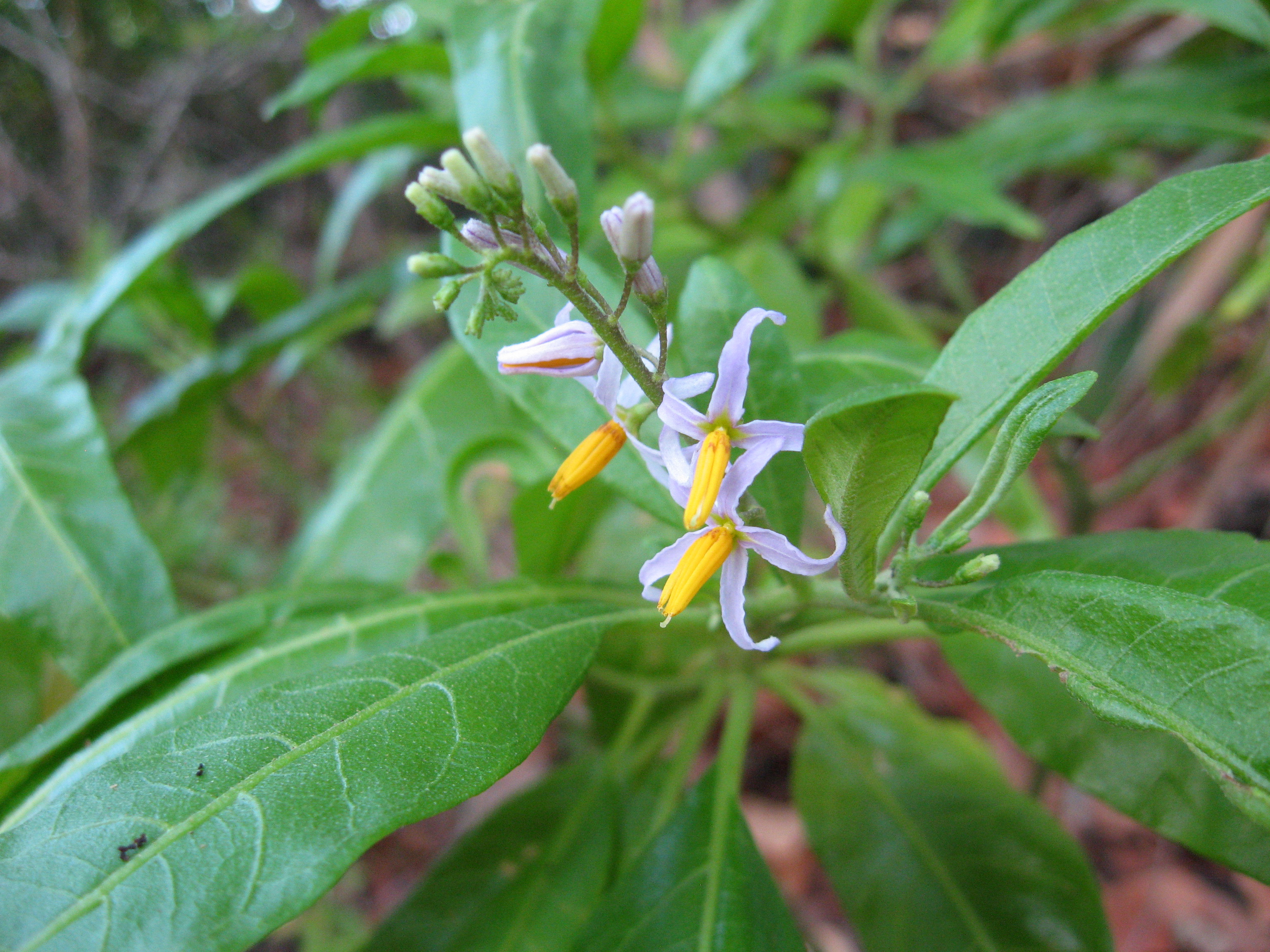

Conservation status
- Least Concern (IUCN 3.1)

- Secure (NatureServe)

Scientific classification
- Kingdom: Plantae
- Clade: Embryophytes
- Clade: Tracheophytes
- Clade: Angiosperms
- Clade: Eudicots
- Clade: Asterids
- Order: Solanales
- Family: Solanaceae
- Genus: Solanum
- Species: S. bahamense

Binomial name
- Solanum bahamense L.

Synonyms
- Synonymy: Solanum anacanthum Dunal; Solanum cestrifolium Willd. ex Dunal (nomen nudum?); Solanum cestrophyllum Dunal; Solanum fruticosum Mill.; Solanum igneum L.; Solanum igneum var. inerme Dunal; Solanum igneum var. parvifolium Vahl; Solanum lanceifolium Salisb. (non Jacq.: preoccupied); Solanum molle Bertero ex Dunal (non Dunal: preoccupied); Solanum persicifolium Dunal; Solanum persicifolium var. angustifolium Dunal; Solanum persicifolium var. belloi O.E.Schulz; Solanum persicifolium var. parvifolium (Vahl) O.E.Schulz; Solanum racemosum Jacq.; Solanum racemosum var. igneum (L.) O.E.Schulz; Solanum ramosum Lam.; Solanum subarmatum Willd.; Solanum torvum var.? persicifolium (Dunal) M.Gómez; Solanum umbrosum Balb. ex Dunal (non Dunal: preoccupied); Solanum umbrosum Bertero ex Dunal (non Dunal: preoccupied); Solanum varginstonicum Buc'hoz

= Solanum bahamense =

Bahama nightshade

Species of flowering plant

Solanum bahamense, commonly known as the Bahama nightshade, is a plant in the nightshade family. It is native across the West Indies, from the Florida Keys east to Dominica (excluding Hispaniola). It is a common species in coastal habitats, often on calcareous soils.

== Taxonomy ==
Originally described by Carl Linnaeus, it has a convoluted taxonomic history. S. bahamense is known by many junior synonyms and involved in several cases of homonymy.

Some additional varieties of S. bahamense have been described, but they are not considered taxonomically distinct today:

- Solanum bahamense var. inerme Dunal
- Solanum bahamense var. lanceolatum Griseb. (Not to be confused with S. lanceolatum.)
- Solanum bahamense var. luxurians D'Arcy
- Solanum bahamense var. rugelii D'Arcy
- Solanum bahamense var. subarmatum (Willd.) O.E.Schulz
