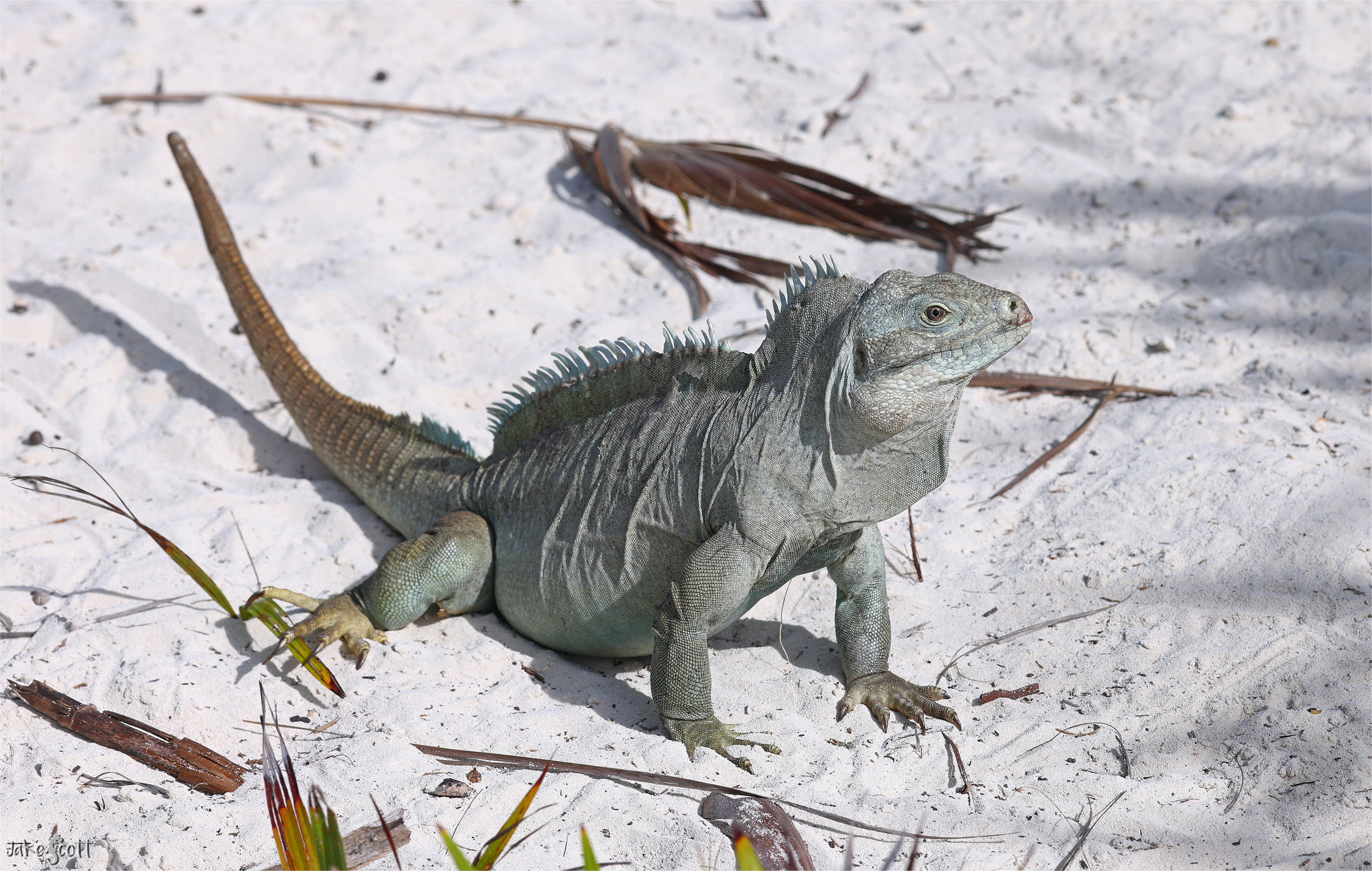

Conservation status
- Endangered (IUCN 3.1)
- CITES Appendix I

Scientific classification
- Kingdom: Animalia
- Phylum: Chordata
- Class: Reptilia
- Order: Squamata
- Suborder: Iguania
- Family: Iguanidae
- Genus: Cyclura
- Species: C. carinata

Binomial name
- Cyclura carinata Harlan, 1825

= Turks and Caicos rock iguana =

Species of lizard

The Turks and Caicos rock iguana (Cyclura carinata) is a species of lizard endemic to the Turks and Caicos islands. This small iguana can reach 30 in (76 cm) and becomes mature at seven years and may live for twenty. A single clutch of up to nine eggs is laid each year, and these take three months to hatch. This iguana is mostly herbivorous, but supplements this by adding some animal matter to its diet.

At one time numerous, these iguanas have been depleted by introduced predators, mainly cats and dogs. Their habitat is being degraded by overgrazing and trampling of vegetation which reduces the availability of food for the iguanas. They have been wiped out of some islands and cling on precariously in others. The International Union for Conservation of Nature has rated them as endangered. Various conservation efforts are being undertaken, and some iguanas have been relocated to uninhabited islets in an effort to prevent them from becoming extinct.

== Taxonomy ==
The Turks and Caicos rock iguana, Cyclura carinata carinata, was first described by American Zoologist Richard Harlan in Fauna Americana in 1825. Its specific name carinata means "keeled" and refers to the animal's scales. The species is endemic to 50-60 of the 200 islands and cays that make up the Turks and Caicos Islands. It has one subspecies which lives on Booby Cay, Bartsch's iguana (Cyclura carinata bartschi). Morphological and genetic data indicate that the closest living relative of C. carinata is C. ricordi of Hispaniola.

== Anatomy and morphology ==
Measuring less than 770 millimetres (30 in) in length when full grown, the Turks and Caicos Rock iguana is one of the smallest species of Cyclura. The lizard's basic color can range from green to brownish grey, usually patterned by darker markings. The species lacks the large scales on the upper surface of its head, characteristic of other species of cyclura and possesses larger dorsal spines than other species of iguana.

Like other members of the genus Cyclura, males of this species are larger than females (in this case twice as large in body mass) and have larger dorsal crests and femoral pores on their thighs making the animals sexually dimorphic.

== Habitat and distribution ==
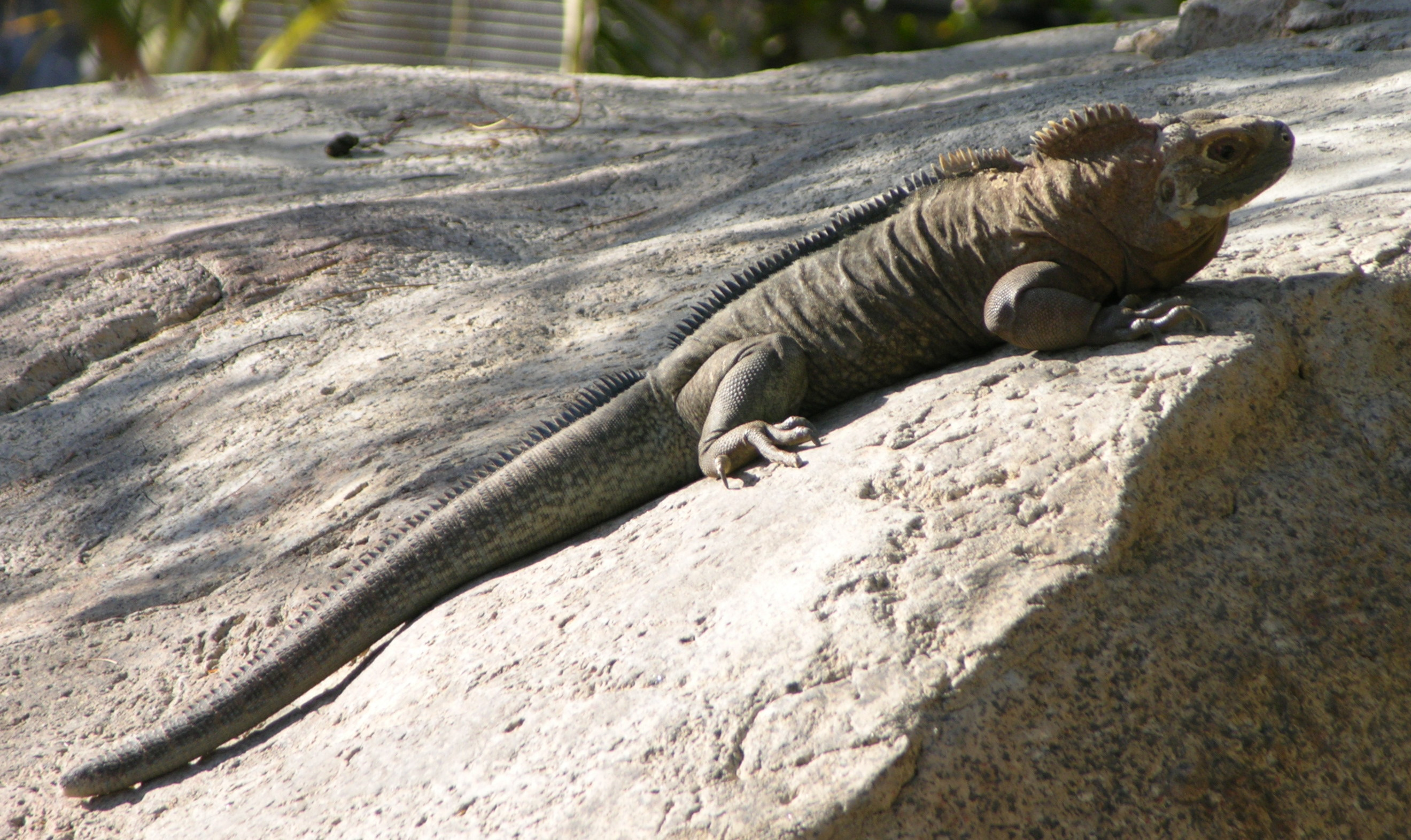
Turks and Caicos rock iguana

The Turks and Caicos rock iguana inhabits small cays, but has been reduced to less than 5% of its original range largely due to the introduction of predators.

2,000 iguanas are the only land creatures that inhabit Little Water Cay. To promote tourism on Little Water Cay, a boardwalk has been built throughout the island. Tourists can take a tour of the island, along this boardwalk, but are not permitted to step off it.

The Turks and Caicos rock iguana dwells in rocky areas and sandy habitats as sand is required for nesting. The Turks and Caicos iguana is diurnal and spends the night in the burrows it has dug or in natural retreats in or under the rocks.

== Diet and longevity ==
Like all Cyclura species, the Turks and Caicos rock iguana is primarily herbivorous, consuming leaves, flowers, and fruits from over 58 different plant species. This diet is very rarely supplemented with insects, mollusks, crustaceans, arachnids, lizards, and carrion. It has been noted that in captivity, it eats both animal and plant food. Gerber and Iverson write that the Turks and Caicos rock iguana may live at least 20 years.

== Mating ==
Adult males are sexually mature at seven years of age and are territorial throughout the year in order to guarantee access to food and females. Females only become territorial when defending their nest site upon laying eggs and for several weeks following. The animals mate in May, and the female lays a single clutch of two to nine eggs in June. The eggs hatch in September after a 90-day incubation period.

== Causes of decline ==
Like most Cyclura species the Turks and Caicos rock iguana is in decline. In this species' case it is primarily due to its small body size which makes it vulnerable to introduced predators such as dogs and cats. In the 1970s a population of 15,000 iguanas was completely destroyed within five years by a mere handful of dogs and cats brought to Pine Cay by hotel workers. Competitive grazing with domestic and feral livestock is a secondary factor.

== Conservation measures ==
Iguanas on Little Water Cay

Although Little Water Cay is home to over 2,000 Turks and Caicos rock iguanas, they have been wiped out from the other cays in their former range. Little Water Cay is now a nature reserve and neither dogs nor cats are permitted on the island to ensure the survival of the critically endangered species.

In 2000 scientists from the San Diego Zoo's division of Conservation and Research for Endangered Species (CRES), under the direction of Conservation Research Fellow Dr. Glenn Gerber translocated 218 iguanas from Big Ambergris and Little Water Cay where their populations were threatened to four uninhabited cays within the Turks and Caicos reserve system.

To date, these iguanas have experienced a 98 percent survival rate; they have adapted to new conditions and even successfully reproduced the immediate breeding season. Yearling iguanas resulting from the reproduction of the original translocated adults from 2002 are exceeding the size of their counterparts on the source Cays from which their ancestors were translocated by as much as 400%.

In 2015, a rat eradication programme was started with funding from the EU-BEST in order to control the rodent population.

Legislation to protect the iguanas has been drafted by the Turks and Caicos government in 2003. Additionally, the National Trust for the Turks and Caicos Islands has stewardship for the Little Water Cay to ensure that it is not mismanaged and has initiated a program to remove feral cats from Pine Cay and Water Cay.
