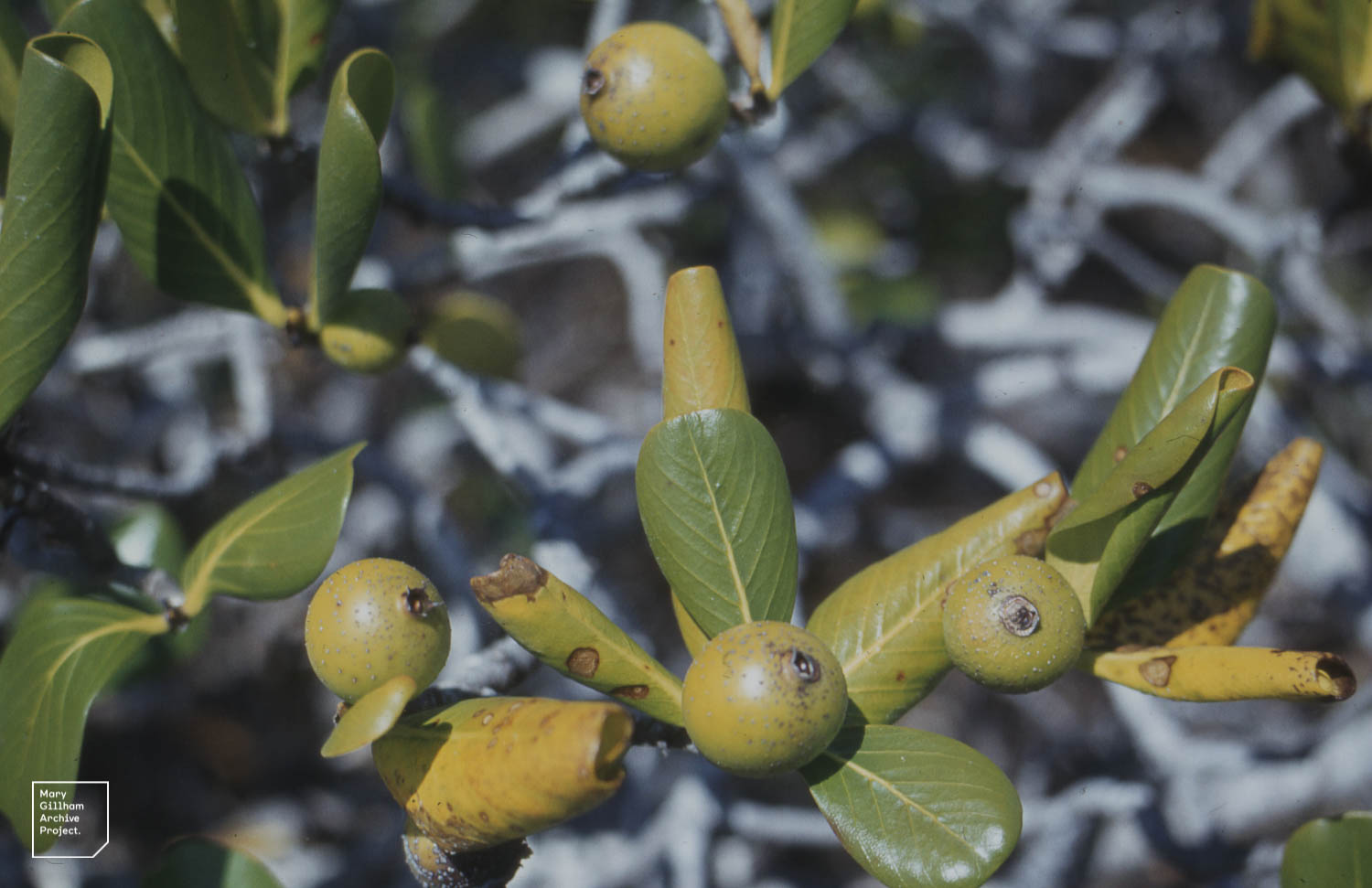

Scientific classification
- Kingdom: Plantae
- Clade: Tracheophytes
- Clade: Angiosperms
- Clade: Eudicots
- Clade: Asterids
- Order: Gentianales
- Family: Rubiaceae
- Genus: Casasia
- Species: C. clusiifolia

Binomial name
- Casasia clusiifolia (Jacq.) Urb.

= Casasia clusiifolia =

Species of plant

Casasia clusiifolia, also called the sevenyear apple, is a species of plant belonging to the family Rubiaceae. It is common in Florida. It is native to the Bahamas, Bermuda, Cuba, and south Florida.
