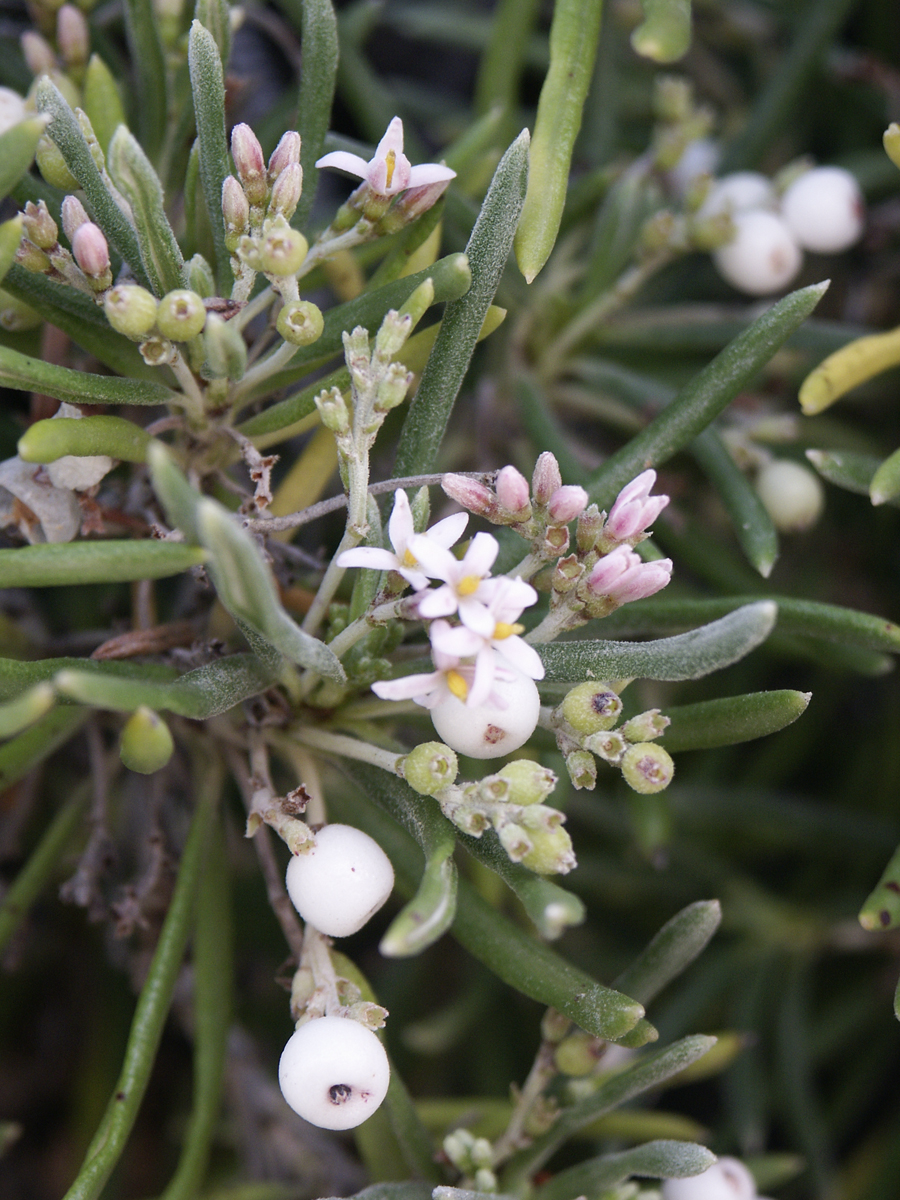

Scientific classification
- Kingdom: Plantae
- Clade: Tracheophytes
- Clade: Angiosperms
- Clade: Eudicots
- Clade: Asterids
- Order: Gentianales
- Family: Rubiaceae
- Subfamily: Cinchonoideae
- Tribe: Strumpfieae
- Genus: Strumpfia; Jacq.
- Species: S. maritima

Binomial name
- Strumpfia maritima Jacq.

Synonyms
- Patsjotti Adans.

= Strumpfia =

Species of plant

Strumpfia is a monotypic genus of flowering plants in the family Rubiaceae. The genus contains only one species, viz. Strumpfia maritima, which is found from southern Florida to northern Venezuela. Strumpfia maritima is also the only species in the tribe Strumpfieae. It is an evergreen shrub of coastal areas that rarely exceeds 1 m (3.3 ft) in height. Pride of Big Pine is a common name. Strumpfia was named by Nicolaus Jacquin in 1760 in his compilation entitled Enumeratio Systematis Plantarum. It was named for Christopher Strumpf, professor of chemistry and botany at Hall, in Magdeburg, and editor of Carl Linnaeus's Genera Plantarum.
