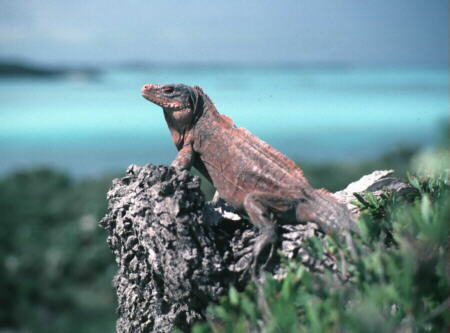

Conservation status
- Endangered (IUCN 3.1)

Scientific classification
- Kingdom: Animalia
- Phylum: Chordata
- Class: Reptilia
- Order: Squamata
- Suborder: Iguania
- Family: Iguanidae
- Genus: Cyclura
- Species: C. rileyi
- Subspecies: C. r. nuchalis

Trinomial name
- Cyclura rileyi nuchalis Barbour and Noble, 1916

= Cyclura rileyi nuchalis =

Acklins ground iguana

Subspecies of lizard

The Acklins ground iguana (Cyclura rileyi nuchalis), also commonly known as the Watling Island iguana, is an endangered subspecies of lizard of the genus Cyclura it is one of three subspecific forms of Cyclura rileyi in the family Iguanidae.

== Taxonomy ==
The Acklins ground iguana is a recognized subspecies of the San Salvador rock iguana, recognized as such since 1975. Its specific name, rileyi, is a Latinized form of the name of American biologist, Joseph Harvey Riley.

== Anatomy and morphology ==
The Acklins ground iguana strongly resembles the San Salvador rock iguana in color and shape. The lizard's back color can range from red, orange or yellow, to green, brown or grey, usually patterned by darker markings. The very brightest colors (red, orange or yellow) are normally only displayed by males and are more pronounced which at warmer body temperatures. Immature iguanas lack these bright colors, being either solid brown or grey with faint slightly darker stripes. What makes this iguana stand out from the other two subspecies is the scalation on its neck and head.

This subspecies, like other members of Cyclura, is sexually dimorphic; males are larger than females, and have more prominent dorsal crests as well as larger femoral pores on their thighs, which are used to release pheromones.

== Distribution ==
The Acklins ground iguana is endemic to three small cays in the Bahamas.

Natural populations of Acklins ground iguanas are found only on Fish Cay and North Cay in the Acklins Bight, Bahamas. They formerly inhabited Long (Fortune) Cay. An additional introduced population with five founding individuals was established on a small cay in the early 1970s.

These two populations are made up of 12,500-18,800 individual animals. A translocated population in the Exumas Land and Sea Park contains 300 animals and appears to be stable.

== Diet ==
Like all Cyclura species the Acklins ground iguana is primarily herbivorous, 95% of which from consuming leaves, flowers and fruits from 7 different plant species such as seaside rock shrub (Rachicallis americana), and erect prickly pear (Opuntia stricta). This diet is very rarely supplemented with animal matter, although a wild specimen has been recorded eating mice.

== Mating ==
Mating occurs between May and June depending on when the dry season ends, and 2-5 eggs are usually laid within 40 days depending on the size and age of the female. Some females have been observed migrating to coastal areas on the various cays in order to build their nests in the sand, and some guard the nest site for a short period of time. The hatchlings emerge from the nests in August to early September.

== Habitat ==
Unlike every other species of Cyclura the Acklins ground iguana is free of threats by feral predators. The cays they dwell on are remote and human populations leave the animals undisturbed. Natural predators in the form of ospreys, herons, kestrels and seagulls have minimal impact on the populations.

The Acklins Cays also have an abundance of food and vegetation compared to the cays on which other iguanas are found and this also must be considered as a factor in their success. Sea level rise may be the greatest threat these animals face in the future, as the cays lack elevation relief and a sea level rise of 1 meter over the next 100 years could cost the cays up to 50% habitat loss.
