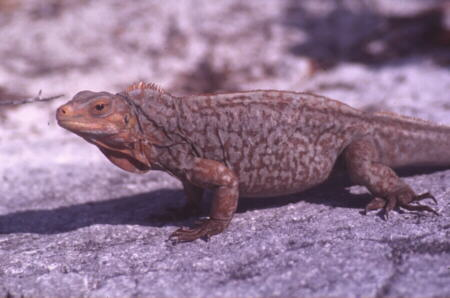

Conservation status
- Critically Endangered (IUCN 3.1)

Scientific classification
- Kingdom: Animalia
- Phylum: Chordata
- Class: Reptilia
- Order: Squamata
- Suborder: Iguania
- Family: Iguanidae
- Genus: Cyclura
- Species: C. rileyi
- Subspecies: C. r. cristata

Trinomial name
- Cyclura rileyi cristata (Schmidt, 1920)

= Cyclura rileyi cristata =

White Cay iguana

Subspecies of lizard

Cyclura rileyi cristata, the White Cay iguana or Sandy Cay rock iguana, is a critically endangered subspecies of lizard of the genus Cyclura native to a single cay in the Bahamas: White Cay (also known as Sandy Cay) located in the Southern Exumas.

== Taxonomy ==
The White Cay iguana is an endangered subspecies of lizard of the genus Cyclura from the family Iguanidae. First identified by Leonhard Hess Stejneger in 1902, and given subspecific status in 1920 by American herpetologist Karl Patterson Schmidt, they are known commonly in the Bahamas as iguanas. Its specific name, rileyi, is a Latinized form of the name of American biologist, Joseph Harvey Riley.

== Description ==
Measuring up to 280 mm (11 in) in length when full grown, the White Cay iguana is the smallest species of Cyclura. The back of adults is usually a gray-brown to orange-brown color. The dorsal scales, forelimbs, and portions of the head and face are highlighted in bright orange. Immature iguanas lack these bright colors, being either solid brown or grey with faint slightly darker stripes.

Males of this species, like other species within the Genus Cyclura are larger than females and have more prominent dorsal crests in addition to femoral pores on their thighs, which are used to release pheromones; females lack these pores and have shorter crests than the males making the animals sexually dimorphic.

== Distribution ==
Once inhabiting all the large islands of the Bahamas, today they are confined to a single cay: White Cay, also known as Sandy Cay. According to Lincoln-Peterson surveys conducted in 1997, the size of the population has been estimated at 150 to 200 individuals.

== Diet ==
Like all Cyclura species the White Cay iguana is primarily herbivorous, 95% of which from consuming leaves, flowers and fruits from 7 different plant species such as Seaside Rock Shrub (Rachicallis americana), and Erect Prickly Pear (Opuntia stricta). Its diet is very rarely supplemented with insects.

== Mating ==
Female White Cay Iguanas attain sexual maturity when they reach 20 cm (7.9 in) in length from snout to vent and weigh 300 g (11 oz). Males appear to mature at a slightly larger size, at approximately seven years of age. Mating occurs in May and June, with clutches of 2-3 eggs usually laid in June or July, in nests excavated in pockets of earth exposed to the sun.

== Conservation ==
White Cay iguanas are one of the most threatened species of all the West Indian rock iguanas and are described as critically endangered and a priority species according to the current IUCN Red List. It may be the most endangered species of lizard on earth.

Imported black rats and a feral raccoon have taken their toll on the population by direct predation. The rats have all been eradicated from the island since a program was instituted in 1999 and the raccoon which someone turned loose on the island was also found and destroyed. The raccoon was responsible for killing almost all of the females while they slept in nesting burrows.

Illicit smuggling for the pet trade is another area in which this animal's population has been harmed. In April 1994, photographs of this subspecies appeared in pictures of Florida reptile wholesalers' inventory in a magazine article.

Additionally, the population may be suffering from a skewed sex ratio of 90-95% males out of the 200 animals left, further harming chances of recovery. The species may face a genetic bottleneck in the future due to this ratio and the fact that each female only lays 2-3 eggs per year.

As of August 2007, no legal captive breeding programs exist outside of the Bahamas. The Bahamian government has refused to issue export permits for any rock iguanas. Locals do attempt to keep tourists away from the island and the island is monitored by United States Drug Enforcement Administration aircraft.
