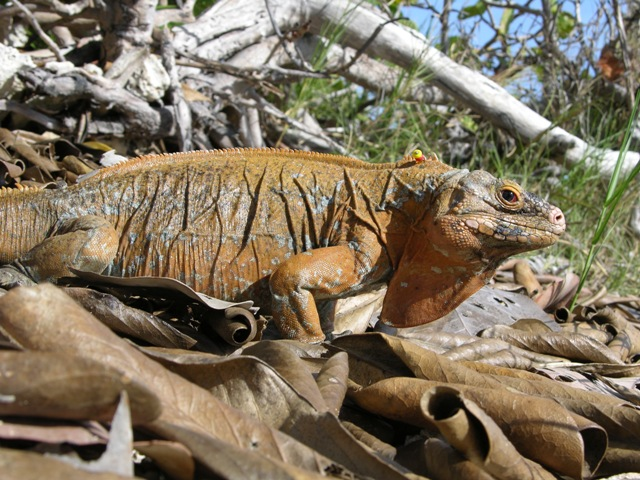

Conservation status
- Endangered (IUCN 2.3)
- CITES Appendix I

Scientific classification
- Kingdom: Animalia
- Phylum: Chordata
- Class: Reptilia
- Order: Squamata
- Suborder: Iguania
- Family: Iguanidae
- Genus: Cyclura
- Species: C. rileyi

Binomial name
- Cyclura rileyi Stejneger, 1903

Subspecies
- C. r. rileyi Stejneger, 1903; C. r. cristata Schmidt, 1920; C. r. nuchalis Barbour & Noble, 1916

= Cyclura rileyi =

Species of lizard

Cyclura rileyi, commonly known as the Central Bahamian rock iguana or the San Salvador rock iguana, is a critically endangered species of lizard in the family Iguanidae. The species is native to three island groups in the Bahamas, and is in decline due to habitat encroachment from human development and predation by feral dogs and cats. There are three subspecies: the Acklins ground iguana (Cyclura rileyi nuchalis), the White Cay iguana (Cyclura rileyi cristata), and the nominotypical subspecies (Cyclura rileyi rileyi).

== Taxonomy and etymology ==
The San Salvador rock iguana is an endangered species of lizard of the genus Cyclura in the family Iguanidae. First described by Leonhard Stejneger in 1903, it is known commonly in the Bahamas as simply "iguana".

Its specific name, rileyi, is a Latinized form of the surname of American ornithologist Joseph Harvey Riley, who collected the holotype.

=== Subspecies ===
As of 1975 two additional subspecific forms have been identified along with the nominal subspecies: the Acklins ground iguana (C. r. nuchalis) and the White Cay iguana (C. r. cristata). Together they are one of the most threatened species of all the West Indian rock iguanas and are described as critically endangered according to the current IUCN Red List.

Image	Scientific name	Common name	Distribution
	Cyclura rileyi rileyi	San Salvador rock iguana	San Salvador, Bahamas
	Cyclura rileyi cristata	White Cay iguana or Sandy Cay rock iguana	White Clay, the Bahamas
	Cyclura rileyi nuchalis	Acklins ground iguana	Fish Cay and North Cay in the Acklins Bight, Bahamas

== Anatomy and morphology ==
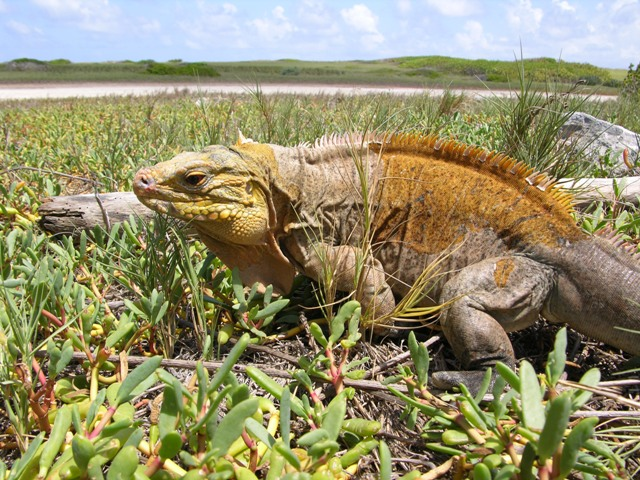
Cyclura rileyi rileyi from Low Cay.

Measuring 300 to 390 mm (12 to 15 in) in snout-to-vent length (SVL) when full grown, the San Salvador rock iguana is a colorful lizard, the coloration varying between subspecies as well as between individual specimens. The lizard's back color can range from red, orange or yellow, to green, brown or grey, usually patterned by darker markings. The very brightest colors (red, orange, blue, or yellow) are normally only displayed by males and are more pronounced when at warmer body temperatures. Immature iguanas lack these bright colors, being either solid brown or grey with faint slightly darker stripes.

This species, like other species of Cyclura, is sexually dimorphic; males are larger than females, and have more prominent dorsal crests as well as larger femoral pores on their thighs, which are used to release pheromones.

== Distribution ==
Once inhabiting all the large islands of the Bahamas, today C. rileyi is confined to six populations in small remote cays of three island groups: San Salvador Island, Acklins, and Exuma. A study in 1995 estimated there were between 426 and 639 specimens left in the wild, and that this number has likely been reduced since much of their habitat was destroyed in 1999 by Hurricane Floyd. The three island groups, each harboring its own subspecies, are on separate banks and were not connected during the last glacial period when water levels were 100 m (330 ft) lower than they are at present.

== Diet ==
Like all Cyclura species, the San Salvador rock iguana's diet is primarily herbivorous, 95% of which comes from consuming leaves, flowers and fruits from 7 different plant species such as seaside rock shrub (Rachicallis americana), and erect prickly pear (Opuntia stricta). This diet is very rarely supplemented with insect larvae, crabs, slugs, dead birds and fungi.

== Mating ==
Female San Salvador rock iguanas attain sexual maturity when they reach 20 cm (7.9 in) in length from snout to vent and weigh 300 g (11 oz). Males appear to mature at a slightly larger size, at approximately seven years of age.

Mating occurs in May and June, with clutches of 3-10 eggs usually laid in June or July, in nests excavated in pockets of earth exposed to the sun. Individuals are aggressively territorial from the age of about 3 months.

== Conservation ==
While the island's natives often used iguanas as food and funerary offerings in pre-colonial times, man's largest-scale devastation to these animals was as a result of clear-cutting forests to create plantations as well as the introduction of non-native species. Introduced black rats, raccoons, feral dogs, mongoose, hogs, and cats have taken their toll on the population by direct predation, as have the larvae of a moth (Cactoblastis cactorum), introduced decades ago to the Caribbean, which are rapidly devastating prickly-pear cacti, an important food source for the iguanas. The Guana Cay population has been reduced to less than 24 individual animals.

Other threats by humans include tourists trampling iguanas' nests, iguanas contracting disease from eating human garbage, and illicit smuggling for the pet trade. As development increases on the islands and further isolates populations, these animals will be threatened by lack of gene flow between the cays.

As of August 2007, no legal captive breeding programs exist outside of the Bahamas. The Bahamian government has refused to issue export permits for any rock iguanas. However, Ardastra Gardens in Nassau (New Providence Island, Bahamas) currently holds two juveniles and plans to implement a captive breeding program. A public relations campaign is planned to heighten awareness and appreciation among island residents for this endemic lizard.
