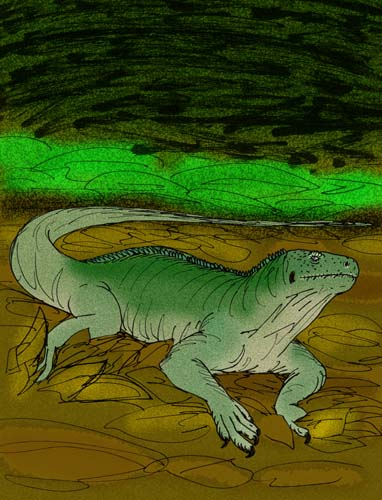
- Reconstruction

Scientific classification
- Domain: Eukaryota
- Kingdom: Animalia
- Phylum: Chordata
- Class: Reptilia
- Order: Squamata
- Suborder: Iguania
- Family: Iguanidae
- Genus: Brachylophus
- Species: †B. gibbonsi

Binomial name
- †Brachylophus gibbonsi Pregill & Steadman, 2004

= Brachylophus gibbonsi =

Brachylophus gibbonsi Temporal range: Holocene

Extinct species of lizard

Brachylophus gibbonsi is an extinct species of large (~1.2 m long) iguanid lizard from Tonga in the South Pacific Ocean. Its remains have been found associated with cultural sites on Lifuka, four other islands in the Haʻapai group, and Tongatapu. It was consumed by the early Tongans and probably became extinct within a century of human colonization of the archipelago 2800 years ago.

The four extant members of Brachylophus are much smaller, and are found in nearby Fiji. B. fasciatus is now present on Tonga as well, but was probably brought there from Fiji by humans about 800 years ago. B. gibbonsi is estimated to have been about 1.8 times the length of its living relatives. An even larger Fijian iguana of the genus Lapitiguana was also formerly present, and also became extinct shortly after the arrival of humans.

The genus Brachylophus is thought to have reached the South Pacific by rafting on the South Equatorial Current 9000 km westward from the Americas, where their closest extant relatives remain. Another theory is that the South Pacific iguanas descend from a more widespread lineage of (now extinct) Old World iguanids that diverged from their New World relatives in the Paleogene, migrated to either Australia or Southeast Asia, and then somehow made their way to the Fijian and Tongan archipelagos. However, no living or fossil members of the putative lineage have been found outside Fiji and Tonga.

== See also ==
- Pumilia novaceki
