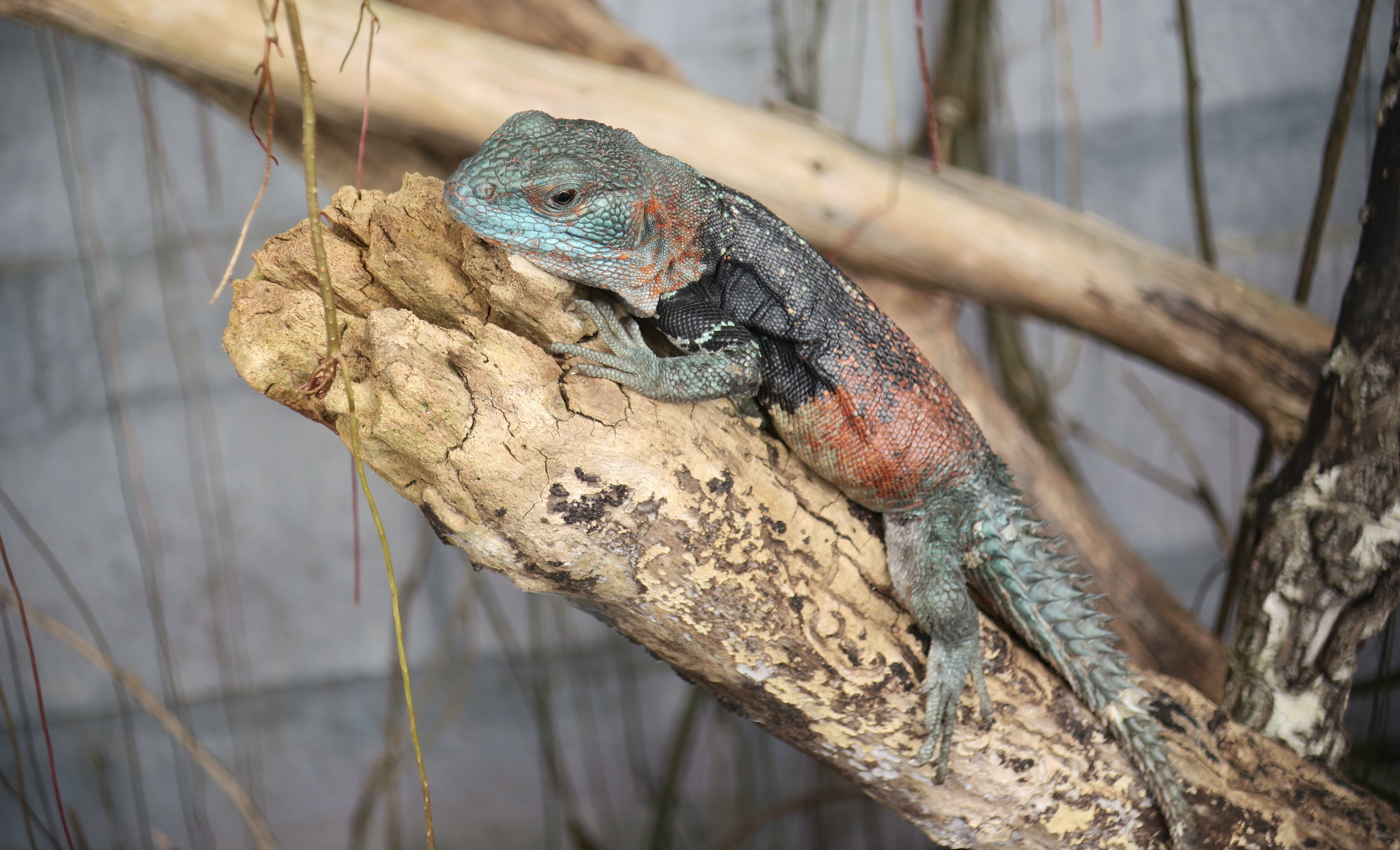

Conservation status
- Near Threatened (IUCN 3.1)

Scientific classification
- Kingdom: Animalia
- Phylum: Chordata
- Class: Reptilia
- Order: Squamata
- Suborder: Iguania
- Family: Iguanidae
- Genus: Cachryx
- Species: C. alfredschmidti

Binomial name
- Cachryx alfredschmidti (G. Köhler, 1995)

Synonyms
- Ctenosaura alfredschmidti G. Köhler, 1995; Cachryx alfredschmidti — Malone et al., 2017

= Campeche spiny-tailed iguana =

Species of lizard

The Campeche spiny-tailed iguana (Cachryx alfredschmidti) is a species of lizard in the family Iguanidae. The species is native to southeastern Mexico and adjacent Guatemala.

== Etymology ==
The specific name, alfredschmidti, is in honor of German herpetoculturist Alfred Schmidt.

== Description ==
Adult males of C. alfredschmidti reach at least 170 mm (6.7 in) and females 152 mm (6.0 in) in snout-to-vent length (SVL). Tail length varies from 74% to 85% SVL.

== Geographic range ==
C. alfredschmidti was thought to be endemic to southern Campeche in Mexico. However, in 2003, this species was also recorded by a scientific expedition to the Mirador-Río Azul National Park in the Petén Department in Northern Guatemala. This was the first record in Guatemala's herpetofauna for this species.

== Habitat ==
The natural habitat of C. alfredschmidti is tropical moist lowland forest and seasonally flooded scrub forest.

== Behavior ==
C. alfredschmidti is arboreal. It can find safety in hollow branches and tree trunks, blocking the entrance with its spiny tail.

== Diet ==
Fecal samples suggests that the diet of C. alfredschmidti consists of leaves, though it probably will eat arthropods too.

== Reproduction ==
C. alfredschmidti is oviparous.

== Conservation status ==
C. alfredschmidti is potentially threatened by habitat loss and degradation. The Guatemalan population was found in the Mirador-Río Azul National Park.
