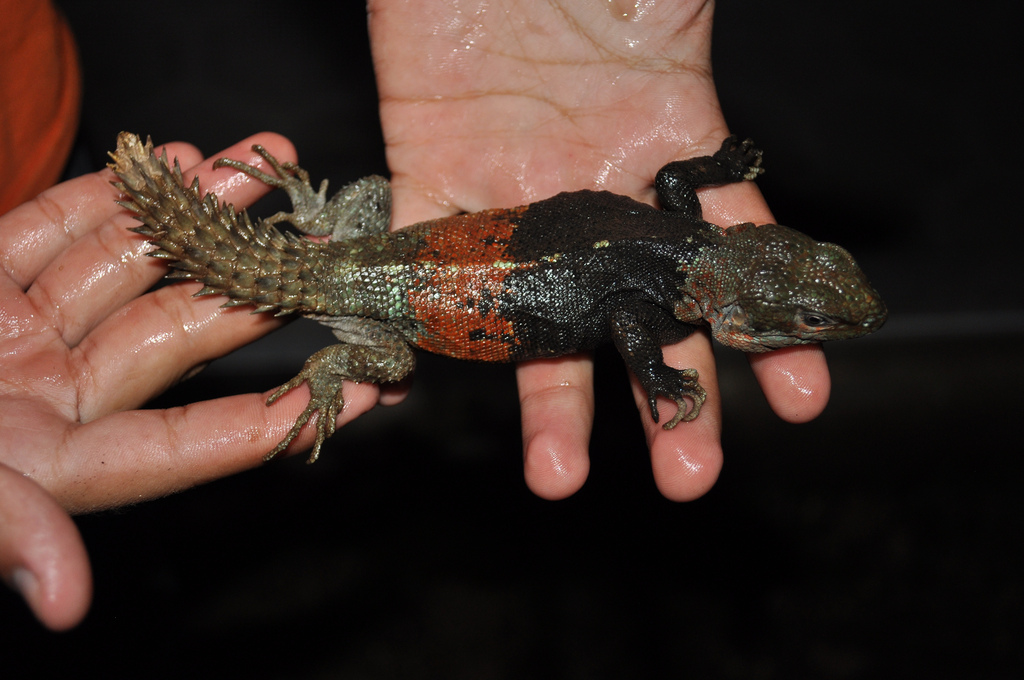

Conservation status
- Vulnerable (IUCN 3.1)
- CITES Appendix II

Scientific classification
- Kingdom: Animalia
- Phylum: Chordata
- Class: Reptilia
- Order: Squamata
- Suborder: Iguania
- Family: Iguanidae
- Genus: Cachryx
- Species: C. defensor

Binomial name
- Cachryx defensor Cope, 1866

Synonyms
- Ctenosaura defensor (Cope, 1866); Enyaliosaurus defensor (Cope, 1866)

= Yucatán spiny-tailed iguana =

Species of lizard

The Yucatán spiny-tailed iguana (Cachryx defensor) is a species of lizard in the family Iguanidae. It is endemic to northern Yucatán, Mexico.

== Habitat ==
Its natural habitat is tropical and subtropical dry broadleaf forests.

== Conservation status ==
It is threatened by habitat loss.

== In the United States ==
A foot-long specimen was found scurrying across a loading dock on July 29, 2010, at Ford Motor Co.'s Van Dyke Transmission Plant in Sterling Heights, Michigan. The creature was a stowaway in parts crates shipped from the Yucatán peninsula in Mexico. The creature was moved to an enclosure at the Detroit Zoo, which it will share with a female black iguana.
