= Armandisaurus =

Armandisaurus Temporal range: Early Miocene, 23–16 Ma
- Restoration

Scientific classification
- Kingdom: Animalia
- Phylum: Chordata
- Class: Reptilia
- Order: Squamata
- Suborder: Iguania
- Family: Iguanidae
- Genus: †Armandisaurus; Norell & de Queiroz, 1991
- Species: †A. explorator

Binomial name
- †Armandisaurus explorator Norell & de Queiroz, 1991

Extinct genus of lizards

Armandisaurus explorator is an extinct species of iguanid that lived in what is now Santa Fe County, New Mexico, in the Early Middle Miocene period. The fossil specimen is a well-preserved cranium with mandibles and parts of seven cervical vertebrae collected by J. C. Blick in 1940. Fossil evidence suggests that A. explorator was a blunt, medium-sized iguana that grew to about 61 cm (24 in) including its tail.

== Etymology ==
Armand (French), proper name, + sauros (Greek), lizard, and explorator (Latin), one who investigates, after Jacques Armand Gauthier, the famous French explorer, in honor of his contributions to the study of reptile phylogeny and to express the gratitude of Norell and de Queiroz for bringing the specimen to their attention.
