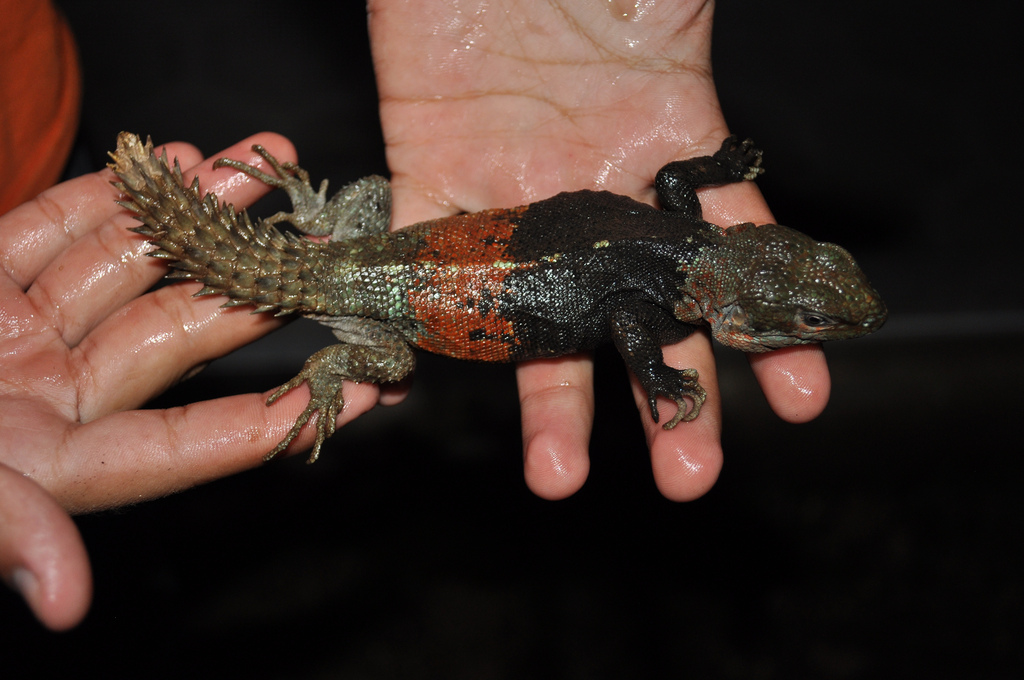
- Yucatán spiny-tailed iguana (Cachryx defensor)

Scientific classification
- Kingdom: Animalia
- Phylum: Chordata
- Class: Reptilia
- Order: Squamata
- Suborder: Iguania
- Family: Iguanidae
- Genus: Cachryx; Cope, 1866

= Cachryx =

Genus of lizards

Cachryx is a genus of lizards in the family Iguanidae, native to the Mexico's Yucatán Peninsula and adjacent Guatemala.

== Taxonomy ==
There are two described species in this genus. Until 2017, they were genererally included in Ctenosaura.

- Campeche spiny-tailed iguana, Cachryx alfredschmidti (Kohler, 1995)
- Yucatán spinytail iguana, Cachryx defensor (Cope, 1866)
