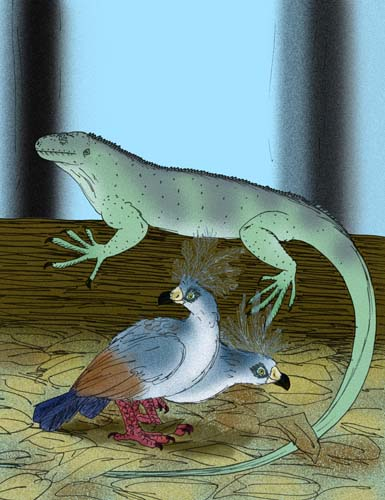
- Natunaornis and Lapitiguana

Scientific classification
- Kingdom: Animalia
- Phylum: Chordata
- Class: Reptilia
- Order: Squamata
- Suborder: Iguania
- Family: Iguanidae
- Genus: †Lapitiguana
- Species: †L. impensa

Binomial name
- †Lapitiguana impensa Pregill & Worthy, 2003

= Lapitiguana =

Lapitiguana Temporal range: Holocene

Extinct genus of lizards

The Fiji Giant Iguana (Lapitiguana impensa) was a large species (1.5 m long) of iguanid which was endemic to Fiji. It became extinct 3000 years ago, presumably as a result of the human colonisation of the islands.

All extant Oceanian iguanas belong to the genus Brachylophus, which also includes a giant extinct species from Tonga. The closest living relatives of the South Pacific iguanas are found in America. Its name is derived from the neolithic Lapita culture.

== See also ==
- Brachylophus gibbonsi
- Pumilia novaceki
