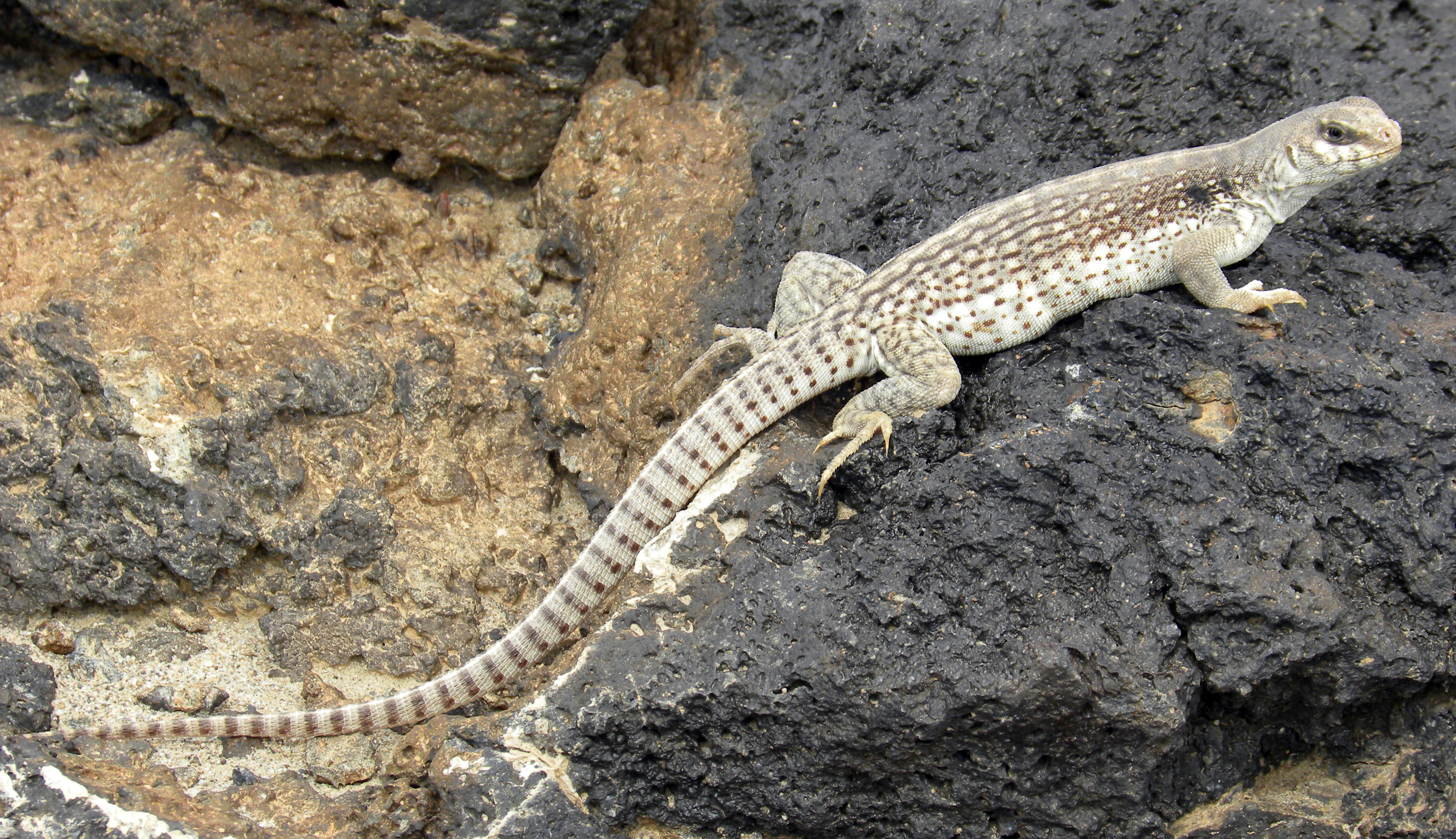
- A desert iguana near Amboy Crater, California

Conservation status
- Least Concern (IUCN 3.1)

Scientific classification
- Kingdom: Animalia
- Phylum: Chordata
- Class: Reptilia
- Order: Squamata
- Suborder: Iguania
- Family: Iguanidae
- Genus: Dipsosaurus
- Species: D. dorsalis

Binomial name
- Dipsosaurus dorsalis (Baird and Girard, 1852)
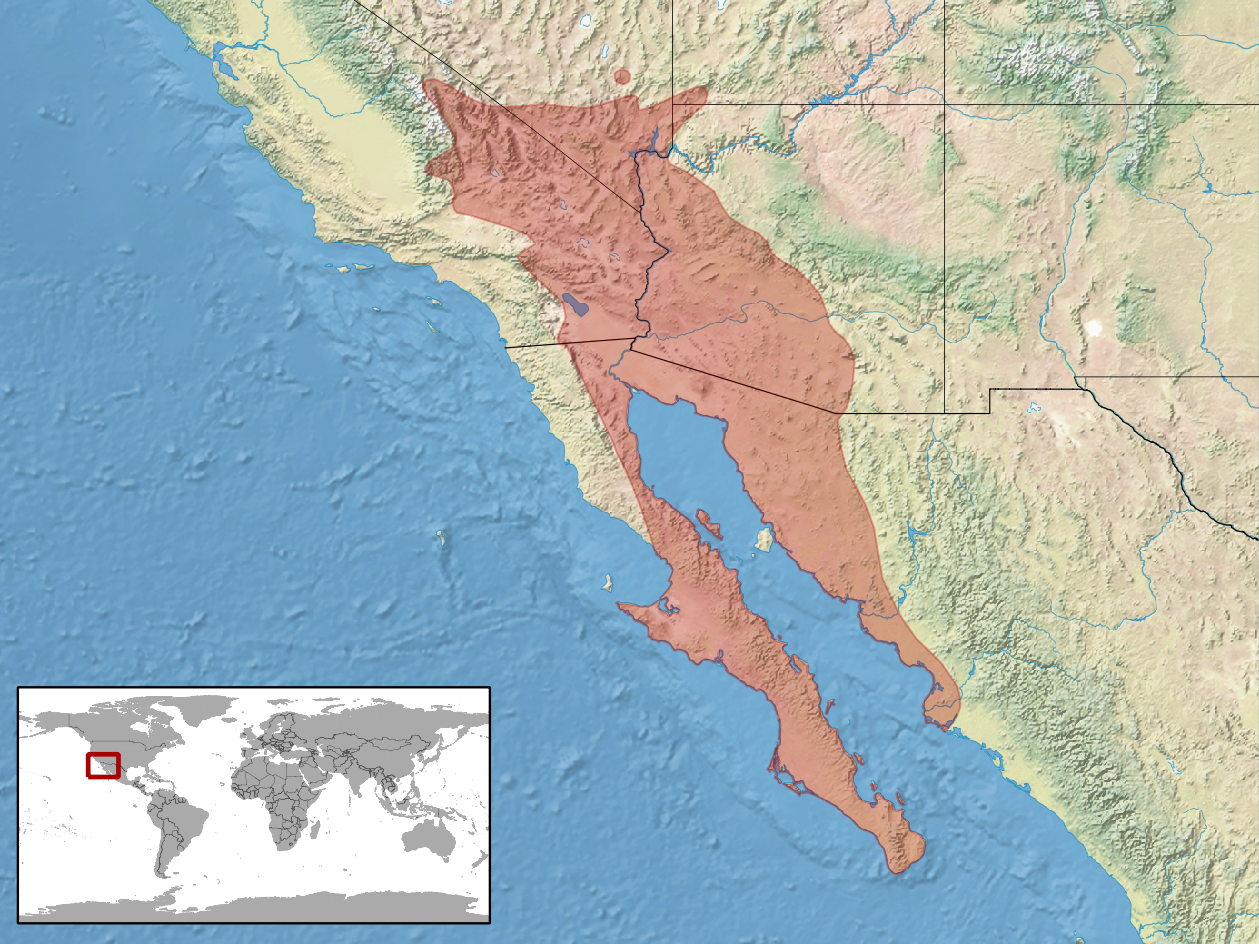

= Desert iguana =

Species of lizard

The desert iguana (Dipsosaurus dorsalis) is an iguana species found in the Sonoran and Mojave Deserts of the Southwestern United States and northwestern Mexico, as well as on several Gulf of California islands.

== Taxonomy ==
The species was first described in the Proceedings of the Academy of Natural Sciences of Philadelphia, by Spencer Fullerton Baird and Charles Frédéric Girard, in 1852 as Crotaphytus dorsalis. It was reclassified two years later as Dipsosaurus dorsalis by Edward Hallowell. The generic name comes from a combination of two Greek words meaning "thirsty lizard": "Dipsa" (δίψα) for "thirsty", and "sauros" (σαῦρος) for "lizard". The specific name, "dorsalis", comes from the Latin word dorsum meaning "spike", in reference to a row of enlarged spiked scales on the middle of the lizard's back which form a crest that extends almost to the tip of its vent. Dipsosaurus contains two species, D. dorsalis, and D. catalinensis. Genetic evidence supports Dipsosaurus being the sister lineage to all other members of Iguanidae, diverging during the late Eocene, about 38 million years ago.

There are two peninsular and one continental subspecies of the desert iguana.

== Description ==
The desert iguana is a medium-sized lizard which averages 41 cm (16 in) in total length, but can grow to a maximum of 61 cm (24 in) including the tail. They are pale gray-tan to cream in color with a light brown reticulated pattern on their backs and sides. Down the center of the back is a row of slightly enlarged, keeled dorsal scales that become slightly larger further down the back. The reticulated pattern gives way to brown spots near the back legs, turning into stripes along the tail. The tail is usually around 1 1/2 times longer than the body from snout to vent. The belly is pale. During the breeding season, the sides become pinkish in both genders.

== Habitat ==
Their preferred habitat is largely contained within the range of the creosote bush, mainly dry, sandy desert scrubland below 1,000 m (3,300 ft). They have a significant presence in the Sonoran and Mojave deserts. They can also be found in rocky streambeds up to 1,000 m. In the southern portion of its range, these lizards live in areas of arid subtropical scrub and tropical deciduous forest.

These lizards can withstand high temperatures and are out and about after other lizards have retreated into their burrows. They seek shade when their body temperature is in the low-forties (Celsius), and seek the protection of a burrow when their body temperature reaches the mid-forties (Celsius). They burrow extensively and if threatened will scamper into a shrub and go quickly down a burrow. Their burrows are usually dug in the sand under bushes like the creosote. They also often use burrows of kit foxes and desert tortoises.

Reproduction also plays a role in where these lizards are found. It is believed that the high temperature environment helps with successful hatching of eggs. The eggs often hatch between temperatures of 28 and 38 degrees Celsius.

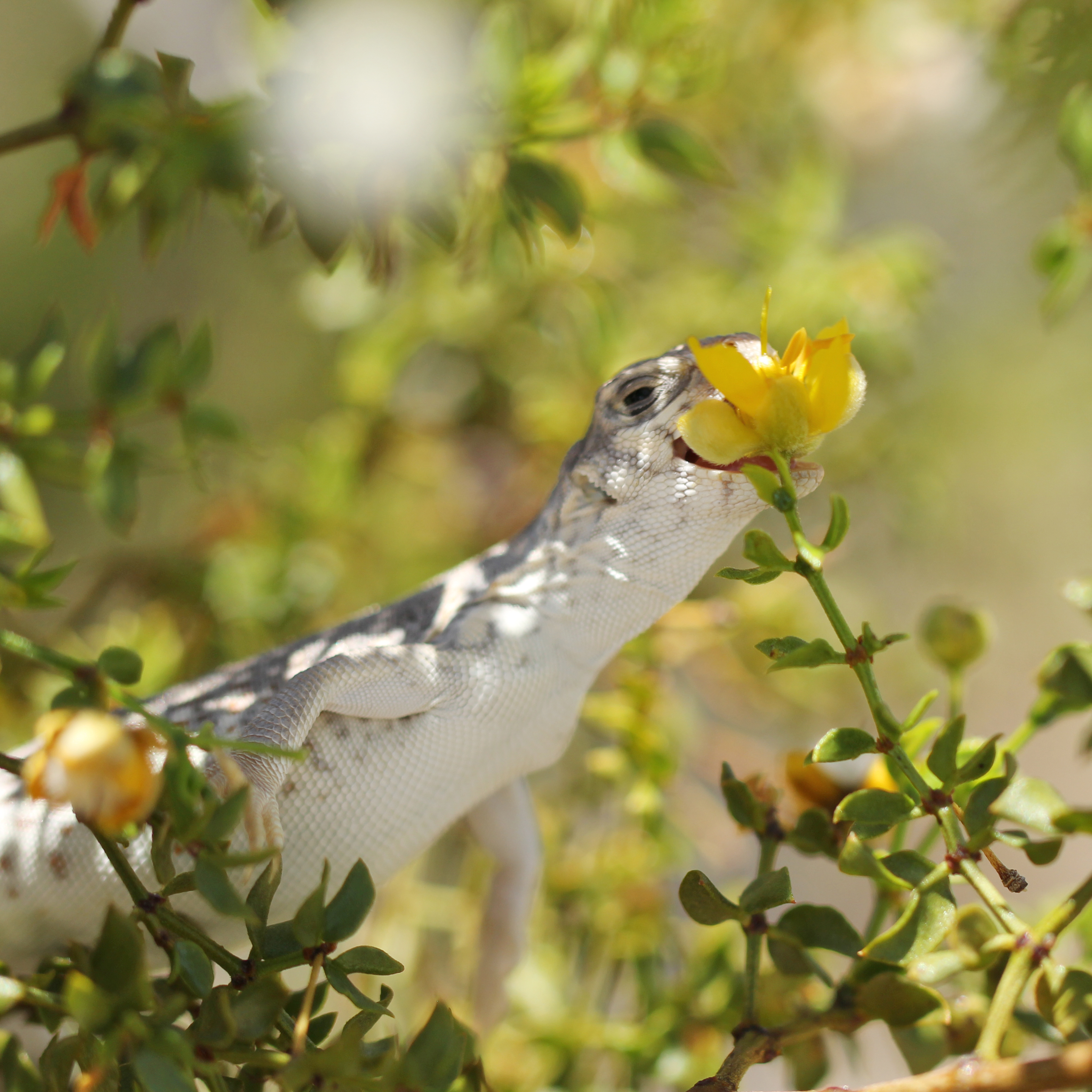
Eating a creosote flower

== Diet and reproduction ==
Mating takes place around May–June. Only one clutch of eggs is laid each year, with each clutch having 3-8 eggs. The hatchlings emerge around September.

Desert iguanas are primarily herbivorous, eating buds, flowers, fruits and leaves of many annual and perennial plants. They are especially attracted to the flowers and leaves of the creosote bush and alfalfa. They also eat insects, especially ants, crickets and mealworms, as well as the feces of other herbivores. Predators of these iguanas and their eggs are birds of prey, foxes, rats, long-tailed weasels, and snakes.
