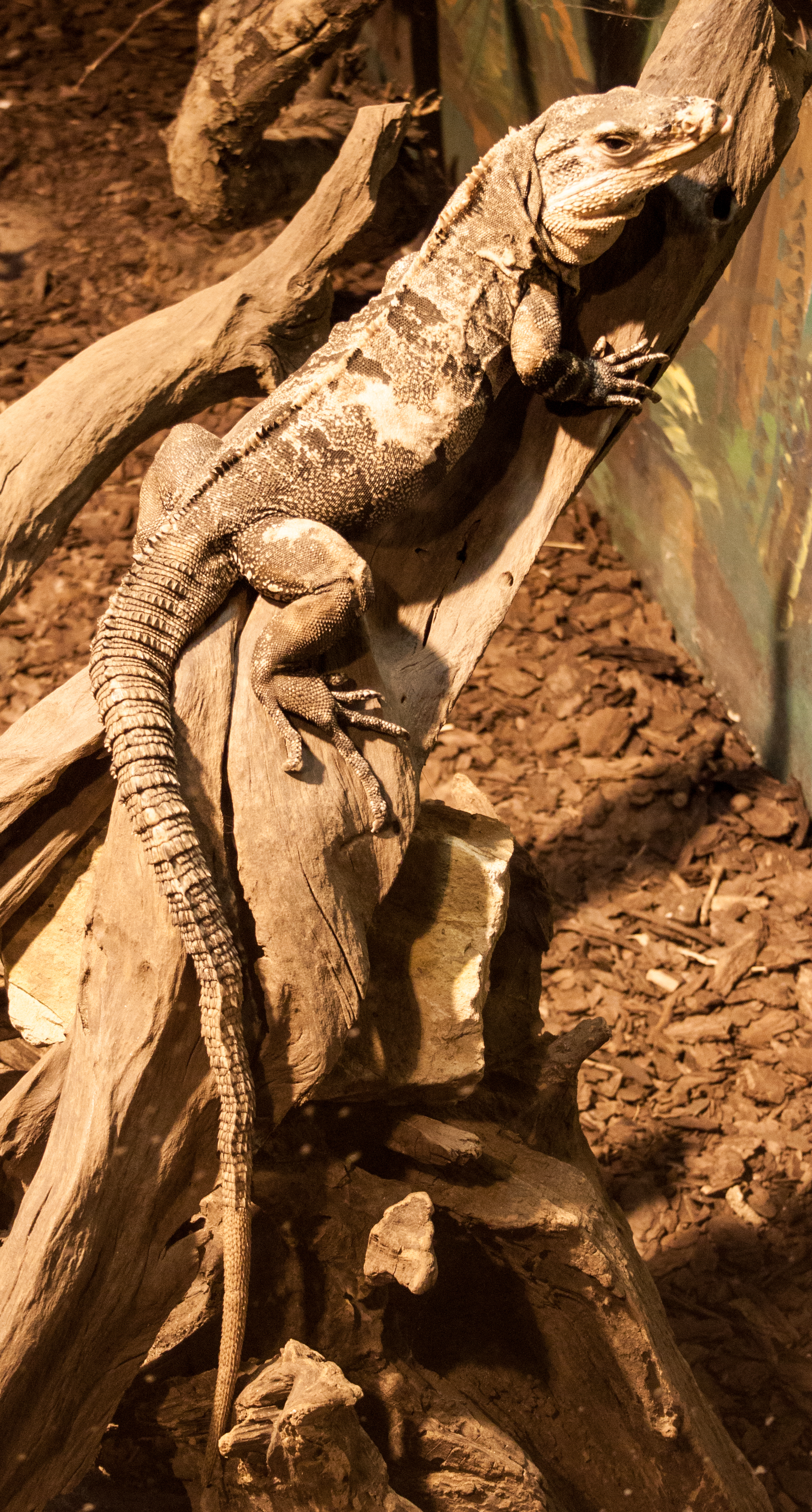

Conservation status
- Least Concern (IUCN 3.1)
- CITES Appendix II

Scientific classification
- Kingdom: Animalia
- Phylum: Chordata
- Class: Reptilia
- Order: Squamata
- Suborder: Iguania
- Family: Iguanidae
- Genus: Ctenosaura
- Species: C. acanthura

Binomial name
- Ctenosaura acanthura (Shaw, 1802)

Synonyms
- Lacerta acanthura Shaw, 1802; Uromastyx acanthurus – Merrem, 1820; Iguana acanthura – Gray, 1831; Cyclura acanthura – A.M.C. Duméril & Bibron, 1837; Ctenosaura acanthura – Gray, 1845

= Ctenosaura acanthura =

Species of reptile in Mexico

Ctenosaura acanthura, is a species of lizard in the family Iguanidae. The species is native to eastern Mexico and extreme western Guatemala. The standardized English name is the Mexican spiny-tailed iguana (Spanish: el garrobo del noreste). Confusingly however, an earlier edition of standardized names for Mexican herpetofauna called C. acanthura the northeastern spiny-tailed iguana and applied the name Mexican spiny-tailed iguana to Ctenosaura pectinata, which was called the western spiny-tailed iguana in the second edition. It has also been referred to as the Veracruz spiny-tailed iguana and Gulf Coast spiny-tailed iguana. It is an egg laying species that is mostly herbivorous and a moderately large lizard commonly growing over one meter (3.3 feet) in total length (tail included).

== Taxonomy and etymology ==
Ctenosaura acanthura was first described by British zoologist George Shaw in 1802 as Lacerta acanthura. The generic name, Ctenosaura, is derived from two Greek words: ctenos (Κτενός), meaning "comb" (referring to the comblike spines on the lizard's back and tail), and saura (σαύρα), meaning "lizard". Its specific name is from the Greek word akanthos (Ἄκανθος), meaning "thorn".

== Description ==
Ctenosaura acanthura has distinctive keeled scales on its long tail, to which its several common names refer. Males are capable of growing up to 1.4 meters (4 ft 7 in) in total length (tail included), and females slightly shorter at 1 meter (3 ft 3 in). It has a crest of long spines which extends down the center of the back. Its base color is black, with white or cream-colored markings.

C. acanthura is often confused with the closely related and similar appearing black iguana (Ctenosaura similis); however, Ctenosaura acanthura does not occur in the Mexican states of Tabasco, Campeche, Yucatan, Quintana Roo, or in Belize (Yucatan Peninsula). Scales of the tail whorls on C. acanthura are very thorny (angle of the keels over 30 degrees), and the crest of large spines on the back is interrupted in the pelvic area, forming a break between the crest of large spines on the tail. On C. similis, the crest of large spines on the back is uninterrupted and continuous with the large spines on the tail.

== Behavior ==
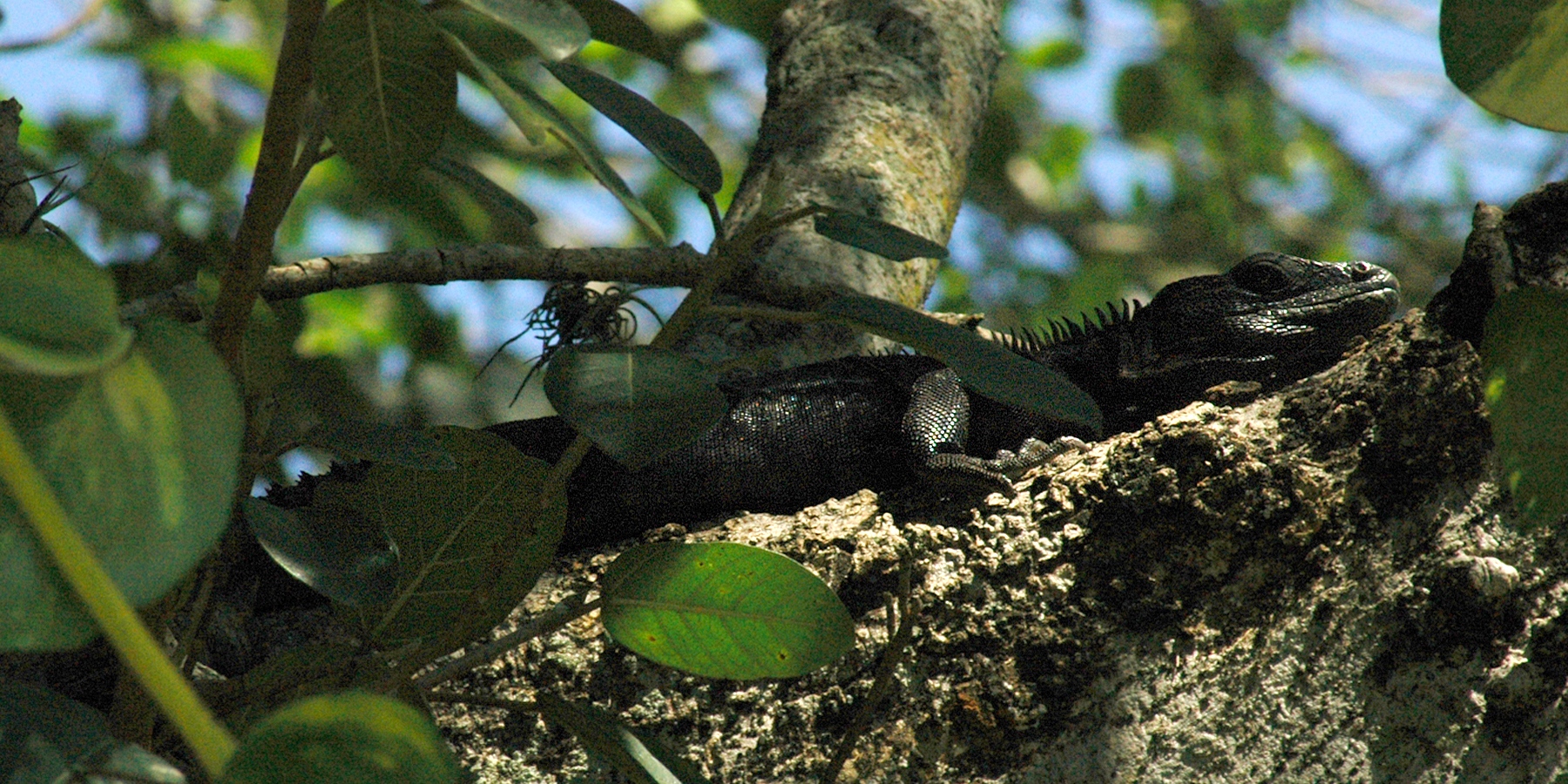
A Mexican spiny-tailed iguana (Ctenosaura acanthura), photographed in situ in southern Tamaulipas, Mexico

Ctenosaura acanthura is an excellent climber and prefers a rocky habitat with plenty of crevices to hide in, rocks to bask on, and nearby trees to climb. It is diurnal and fast moving, employing its speed to escape predators but will lash its tail and bite if cornered. This species may commonly be found around areas of human habitation.

== Diet ==
Ctenosaura acanthura is primarily herbivorous, eating flowers, leaves, stems, and fruit, but it will opportunistically eat smaller animals, eggs, and arthropods. Juveniles tend to be insectivores, becoming more herbivorous as they get older.

== Geographic distribution ==
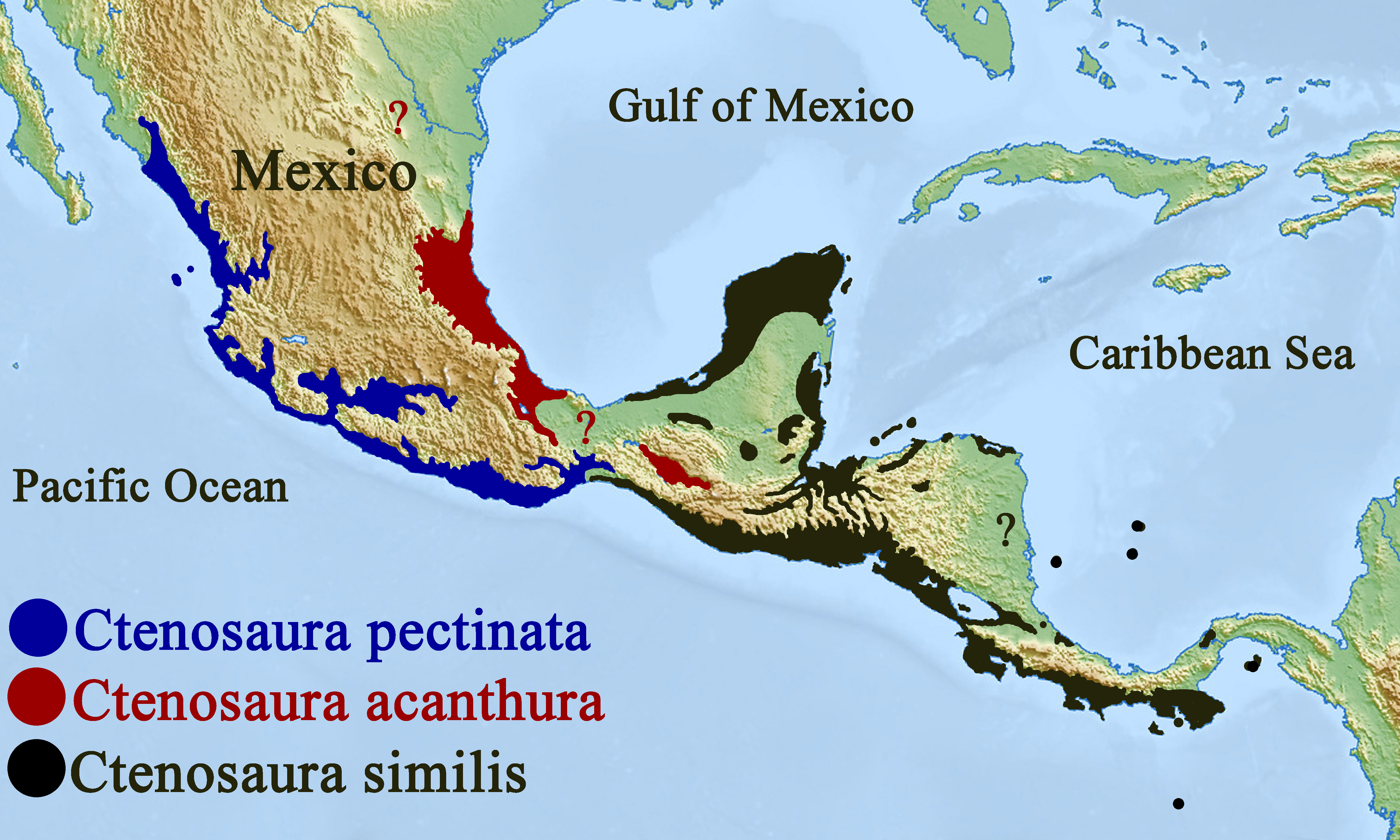
Geographic distribution of three large and wide ranging species of lizards in the genus Ctenosaura (C. acanthura, C. pectinata, C. similis)

Ctenosaura acanthura occurs in the lowlands on the eastern versant of Mexico throughout the Veracruz moist forests ecoregion and western portions of the Petén–Veracruz moist forests, from sea level up to ca. 1,000 meters (ca. 3,300 feet) elevation. It is known from the Mexican state of Tamaulipas in the general vicinity of the Tropic of Cancer, southward throughout most of Veracruz, with a few records from lower elevation localities in adjacent areas of extreme eastern San Luis Potosi, Hidalgo, Pueblea, and Oaxaca. Southward, an apparently isolated population occurs in central Chiapas, in the Rio Grijalva valley, with a record extending the range into extreme western Guatemala.

The status of six specimens collected near the town of Sabinas Hidalgo, Nuevo León by Hobart M. Smith in 1934 is questionable, and C. acanthura has not been reported from Nuevo León before or after 1934. The presence of C. acanthura in Nuevo León is doubtful, and the collector (Hobart M. Smith) did not include the species in his checklist for the state of Nuevo León in later years.

== Reproduction ==
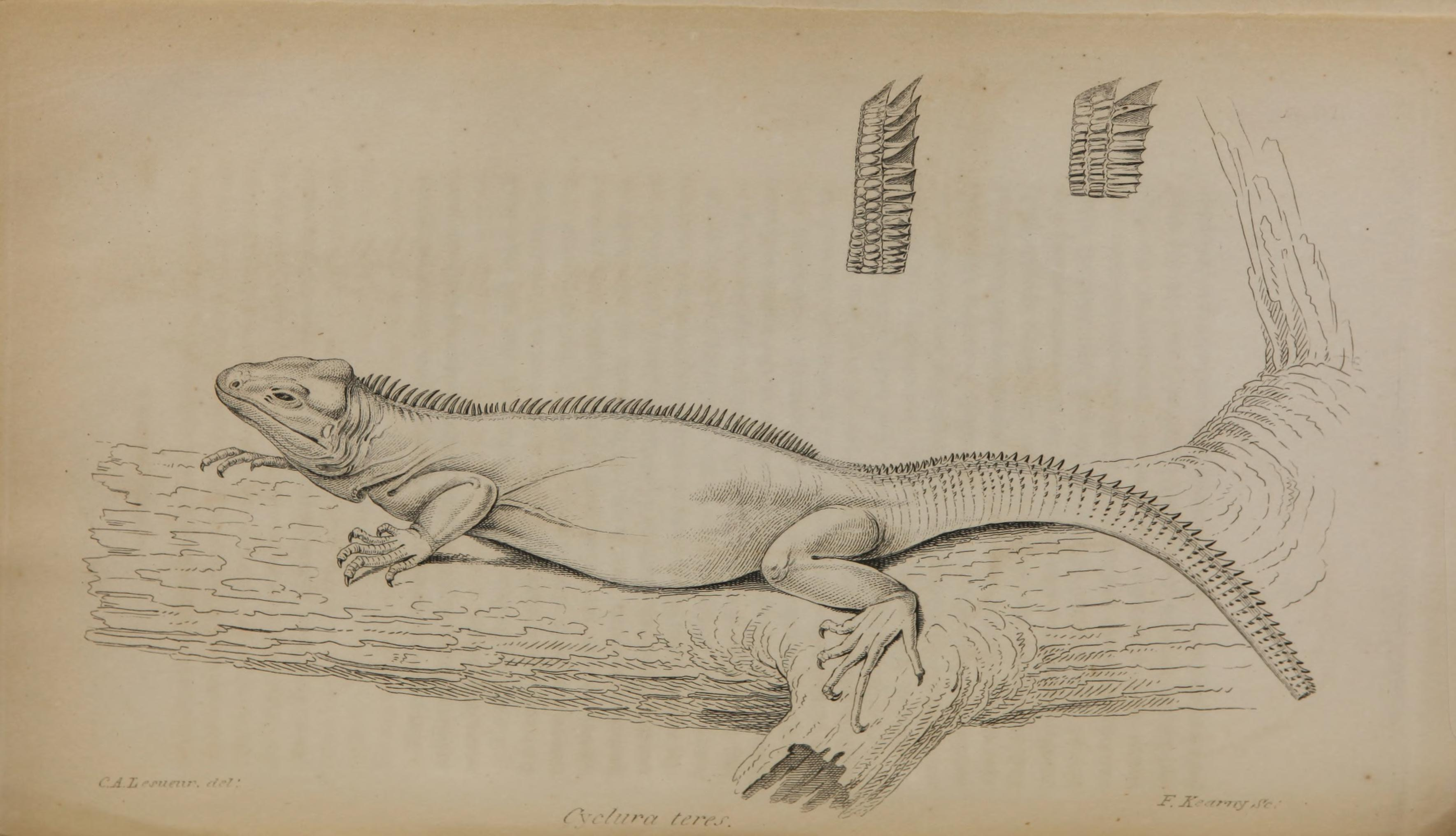
Illustration of Ctenosaura acanthura from 1835

Mating of Ctenosaura acanthura generally occurs in the spring. A male shows dominance and interest by head bobbing, eventually chasing the female until he can catch her and subdue her. Within eight to ten weeks, the female will dig a nest and lay clutches of up to 24 eggs. The eggs hatch in 90 days, with the hatchlings digging their way out of the sand. These juveniles are typically green with brown markings, although all-brown hatchlings have been recorded as well.
