= Pariguana =

Pariguana Temporal range: Late Cretaceous, 67 Ma

Scientific classification
- Kingdom: Animalia
- Phylum: Chordata
- Class: Reptilia
- Order: Squamata
- Clade: Iguanomorpha
- Genus: †Pariguana; Longrich et al., 2012

Type species
- †Pariguana lancensis Longrich et al., 2012

Extinct genus of lizards

Pariguana (meaning "near Iguana" in Greek) is an extinct genus of iguanomorph lizard from the Late Cretaceous of western North America. It is known from a single type species, Pariguana lancensis, named in 2012 on the basis of a partial lower jaw from the Lance Formation in eastern Wyoming. This jaw bone comes from a layer dated approximately 650,000 years before the Cretaceous–Paleogene extinction event. Pariguana was originally considered as the oldest definitive iguanid pleurodontan from North America, and may represent the first stage of the iguanian evolutionary radiation from Asia into North America. However, later phylogenic analysis suggests that it is not pleurodontan although likely to be an iguanomorph.
