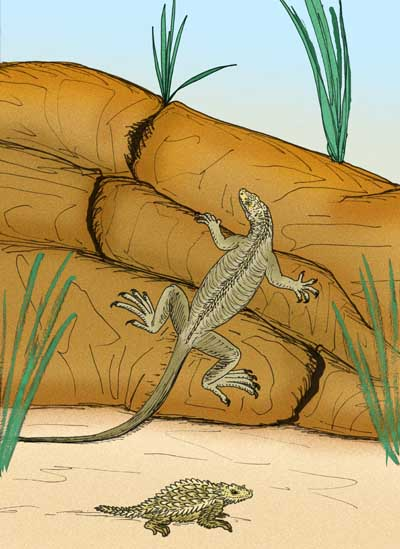
- P. novaceki (top) and Phrynosoma mcallii (bottom)

Scientific classification
- Kingdom: Animalia
- Phylum: Chordata
- Class: Reptilia
- Order: Squamata
- Suborder: Iguania
- Family: Iguanidae
- Genus: †Pumilia
- Species: †P. novaceki

Binomial name
- †Pumilia novaceki Norell, 1989

= Pumilia =

Pumilia Temporal range: Blancan to Irvingtonian, 4.75–1.8 Ma

Extinct genus of lizards

Pumilia novaceki is an extinct iguanid that lived in what is now Palm Springs, California, from the Blancan to Irvingtonian stages of the Pliocene to Early Pleistocene.

It is currently known from a partially crushed skull. Features of the skull show both basal iguanian features, and characters very similar to the extant Iguana, suggesting that the living animal may have resembled a juvenile green iguana.

== Etymology ==
The genus name, Pumilia, means "diminutive" in Latin, in reference to how the living animal would have resembled a very small iguana. The specific name honors Michael J. Novacek, a colleague and friend of the describer, Mark Norell.

== See also ==
- Lapitiguana
- Brachylophus gibbonsi
