= Dipsosaurus catalinensis =

Scientific classification
- Kingdom: Animalia
- Phylum: Chordata
- Class: Reptilia
- Order: Squamata
- Suborder: Iguania
- Family: Iguanidae
- Genus: Dipsosaurus
- Species: D. catalinensis

Binomial name
- Dipsosaurus catalinensis (Van Denburgh, 1922)

Species of lizard

Dipsosaurus catalinensis, the Catalina desert iguana, is a species of lizard in the family Iguanidae. The species is native to Isla Santa Catalina in Mexico.
