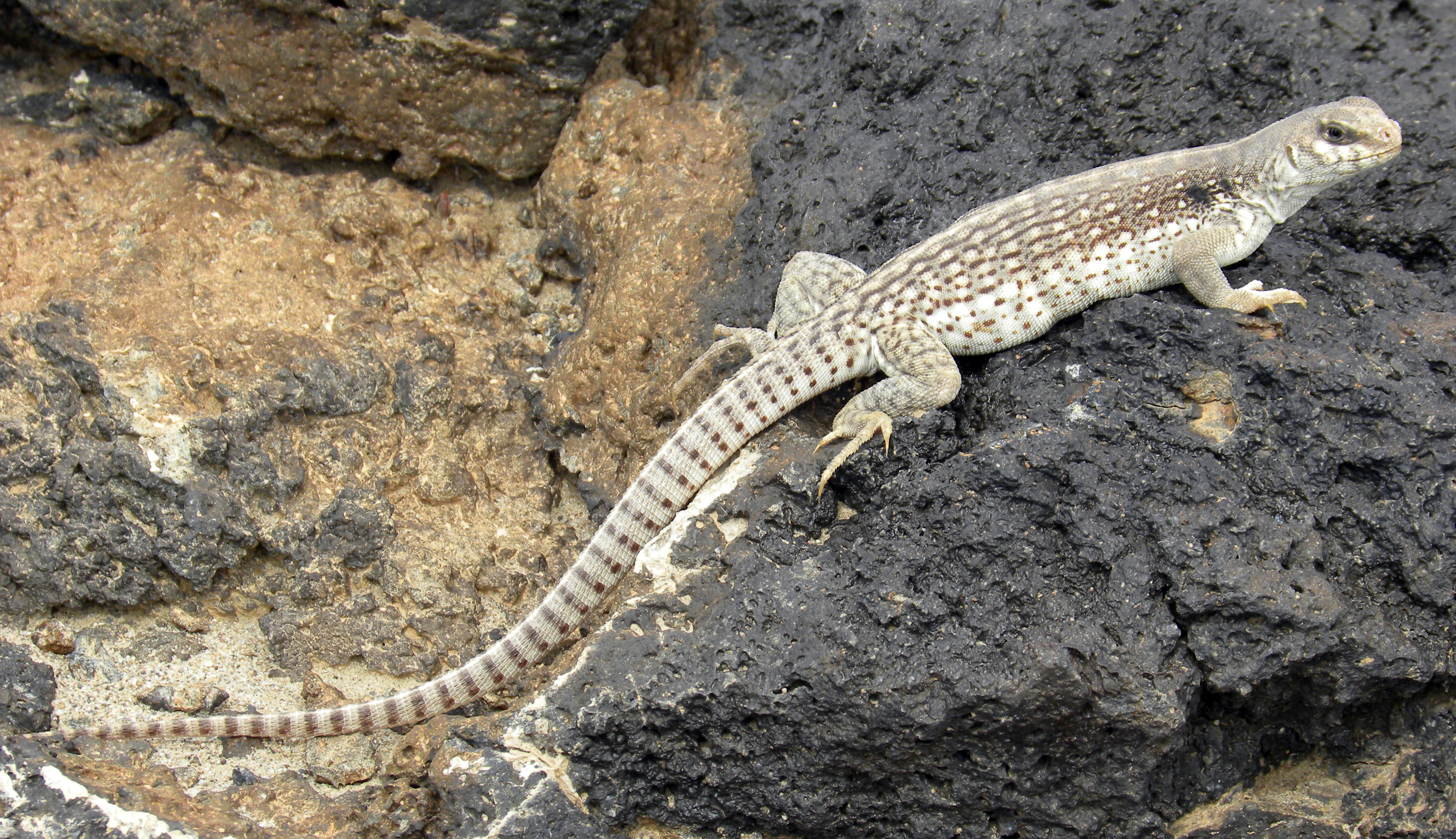
- Desert iguana (Dipsosaurus dorsalis)

Scientific classification
- Kingdom: Animalia
- Phylum: Chordata
- Class: Reptilia
- Order: Squamata
- Suborder: Iguania
- Family: Iguanidae
- Genus: Dipsosaurus; Hallowell, 1854

= Dipsosaurus =

Genus of lizards

Dipsosaurus is a genus of lizards in the family Iguanidae.

== Taxonomy ==
Currently, there are two described species in this genus.

- Desert iguana, Dipsosaurus dorsalis (Baird and Girard), 1852
- Catalina desert iguana, Dipsosaurus catalinensis (Van Denburgh, 1922)
