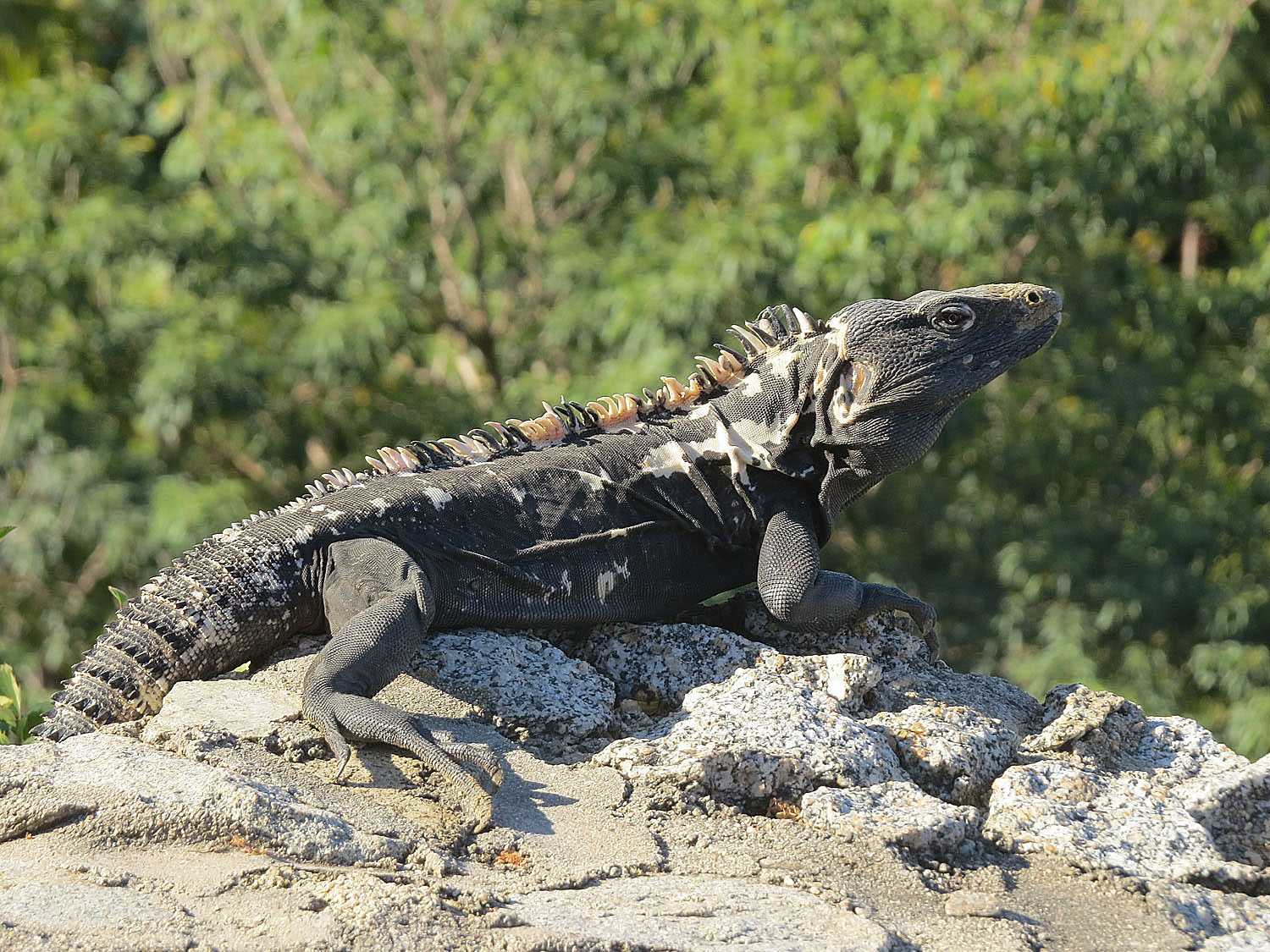
- Ctenosaura pectinata from the coast southwest Mexico

Conservation status
- Least Concern (IUCN 3.1)
- CITES Appendix II

Scientific classification
- Kingdom: Animalia
- Phylum: Chordata
- Class: Reptilia
- Order: Squamata
- Suborder: Iguania
- Family: Iguanidae
- Genus: Ctenosaura
- Species: C. pectinata

Binomial name
- Ctenosaura pectinata (Wiegmann, 1834)

Synonyms
- Cyclura pectinata Wiegmann, 1834; Ctenosaura pectinata — Gray, 1845

= Ctenosaura pectinata =

Species of lizard

Ctenosaura pectinata is a species of moderately large lizard in the family Iguanidae. The species is native to western Mexico.

The standardized English name is the western spiny-tailed iguana. However, an earlier edition of standardized names applied the name Mexican spinytailed iguana to Ctenosaura pectinata. Confoundedly the name Mexican spiny-tailed iguana was applied to Ctenosaura acanthura which was referred to as the northeastern spinytailed iguana in the earlier edition of standardized names. It has also been called simply the spiny-tailed iguana, black spiny-tailed iguana, Guerreran spiny-tailed Iguana, broad-ringed spiny-tailed iguana among other common names.

The taxonomic status, relationships, and validity of a number of spiny-tailed iguana, particularly Ctenosaura acanthura, C. pectinata, and C. similis have an extensive history of confusion in both scientific and popular literature. The status and relationship of Ctenosaura acanthura and C. pectinata remains unstable (as of 2021) with some limited molecular evidence suggesting Ctenosaura acanthura is a synonym (the same species) of C. pectinata, while others recognize the two as allopathic, morphologically distinct species. The common names Mexican spiny-tailed iguana and black spiny-tailed iguana (among many other common names) have been loosely and informally applied to all three species at various times.

== Taxonomy ==
C. pectinata was first described by German zoologist Arend Friedrich August Wiegmann in 1834. The generic name, Ctenosaura, is derived from two Greek words: ctenos (Κτενός), meaning "comb" (referring to the comblike spines on the lizard's back and tail), and saura (σαύρα), meaning "lizard". Its specific name is the Latin word pectinata meaning "combed", also referring to the comblike spines on the lizard's back. The genus it belongs to represents the most diverse group of iguanas with 15 currently recognized species. These species inhabit lowland (below 1200m elevation) dry forests on both coasts of Mexico and Central America. All species of Ctenosaura fall within one of seven clades. Distributions of these clades fall geographically within well established areas. Closely related species show allopatry whereas species from divergent clades show sympatry. Phylogenic study shows this species to be most closely related to C. acanthura, the Northeastern spinytail iguana. Additional mitochondrial DNA research is being performed to determine whether additional subspecies may exist. Because of the different human cultures throughout this species distribution, the clades are being evaluated for their impact from humans. For example, these iguanas are not eaten in their northern ranges by humans as they are in the southern ranges, but the hatchlings in the southern ranges have a better survival rate due to better environmental conditions.

== Description ==
C. pectinata has distinctive keeled scales on its long tail, to which its common name refers. It is one of the larger members of the genus Ctenosaura, capable of growing to 1.3 m (4.3 feet) in total length (including tail), with females being slightly smaller than males at 1.0 m (3.3 ft). It is usually brown or grey-brown in coloration dorsally, with a yellowish ventral surface. It has a crest of long spines which extend down the center of its back. Hatchlings are often a bright green color with no body pattern, and darken as they age.

Ctenosaura pectinata often (but not always) has an irregular piebald pattern on the head or dorsal areas. Although the tail may be banded with light and dark crossbands, C. pectinata typically lacks a clear or well developed crossband pattern on the body, which is often present in the similar appearing and closely related species Ctenosaura similis and Ctenosaura acanthura.Ctenosaura pectinata varies from gray to a brownish-black, with some males exhibiting yellowish colors, and females orange color, on the lateral sides of the body. The young are bright green and unmarked except for black tail bands, present also on adults.

== Distribution ==
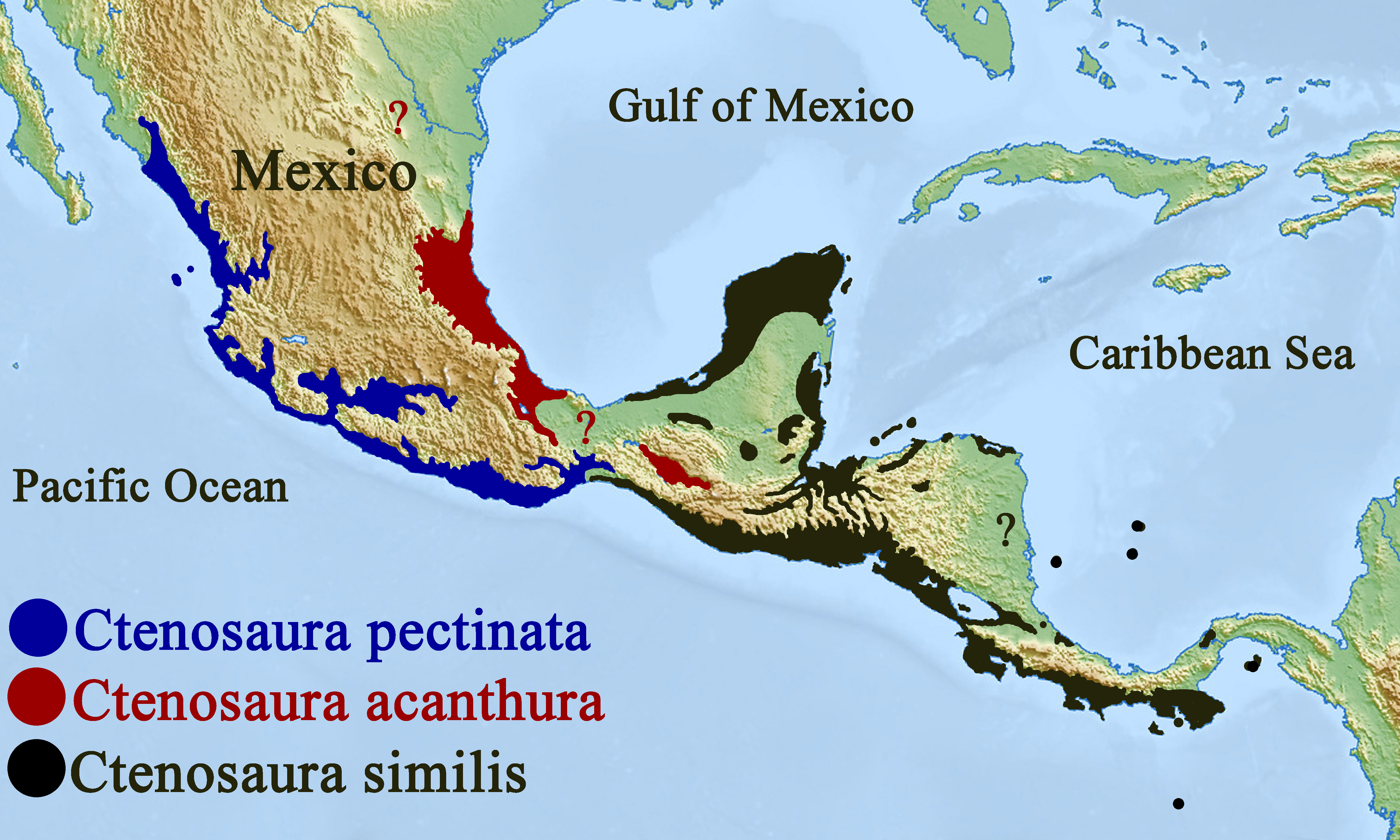
Geographic distribution of the three large and wide-ranging species of lizards in the genus Ctenosaura (spinytail iguanas): C. acanthura; C. pectinata; C. similis.

C. pectinata is native to the coastal lowlands of Western Mexico from Sinaloa to extreme western Chiapas. It follows many valleys and canyons into lower elevations of the Sierra Madre Occidental and Sierra Madre del Sur, including extensive areas of the Rio Balsas Basin.

This iguana has been introduced to Brownsville, Texas and South Florida and reproduces in the wild in several feral populations. On the south-eastern Florida coast, these iguanas have been found on Key Biscayne, Hialeah, and in Broward County.

On the south-western Florida coast, it has been reported on Gasparilla Island, where in December 2007 the population was estimated to be 12,000 iguanas, descended from pets released by a resident in the 1970s. The iguanas are regarded as a nuisance there because they eat ornamental flowers and shrubs, prey on nesting birds and sea turtle eggs, and have been reported to chew through electrical cables. Some residents have speculated that the iguana's habit of burrowing tunnels in the sand could cause dunes and even seawalls to collapse and deprive the island of crucial protection from hurricanes.

There is also a small introduced population at the Arizona-Sonora Desert Museum in Tucson, Arizona. It was established in the 1970’s and has remained confined to the museum grounds.

== Behavior ==
C. pectinata is a social lizard, which has adapted to living in groups as opposed to other species of Ctenosaura which tend to be solitary animals. These iguanas are excellent climbers, and prefer a rocky habitat with plenty of crevices to hide in, rocks to bask on, and nearby trees to climb. They are diurnal and fast moving, employing their speed to escape predators but will lash with their tails and bite if cornered. They are often found dwelling near or in towns in their native Mexico and where they have been introduced elsewhere.

Juveniles consume a diet consisting mostly of insects. However, adults are primarily herbivorous, eating a variety of flowers, leaves, stems, and fruit, but they will opportunistically eat small animals, eggs, and arthropods.

== Reproduction ==
Mating of C. pectinata occurs in the spring. Males show dominance and interest by head bobbing, eventually chasing the female until he can catch her and subdue her. Within eight to ten weeks, the female will dig a nest and lay clutches of up to 50 eggs in a burrow of loose soil. These eggs hatch in 90 days with the bright green babies digging their way out of the sand. The bright green hatchlings first appear around July and are abundant in August.

== Threatened status ==
C. pectinata is used as a traditional food source in its native Mexico. This species is listed as "Least Concern" by the IUCN Redlist, but the species is listed on the Mexican Red List NOM-059-2001 as threatened and it is currently illegal to hunt them in Mexico. This protection does not apply to areas in North America where they have been introduced, however.

Although hunting, trapping, and killing of these iguanas is illegal throughout Mexico; the Balsas depression along the borders of the states Michoacán and Guerrero is one of the largest illegal hunting and trading areas. The remoteness of the areas and lack of enforcement of the laws is seen as the main reason. A study is being conducted by the Instituto de Biologia, UNAM, to solve the over-exploitation problem and to determine if the iguanas can be successfully farmed as a food source similar to the Green Iguana and the closely related Ctenosaura similis.

== Gallery ==
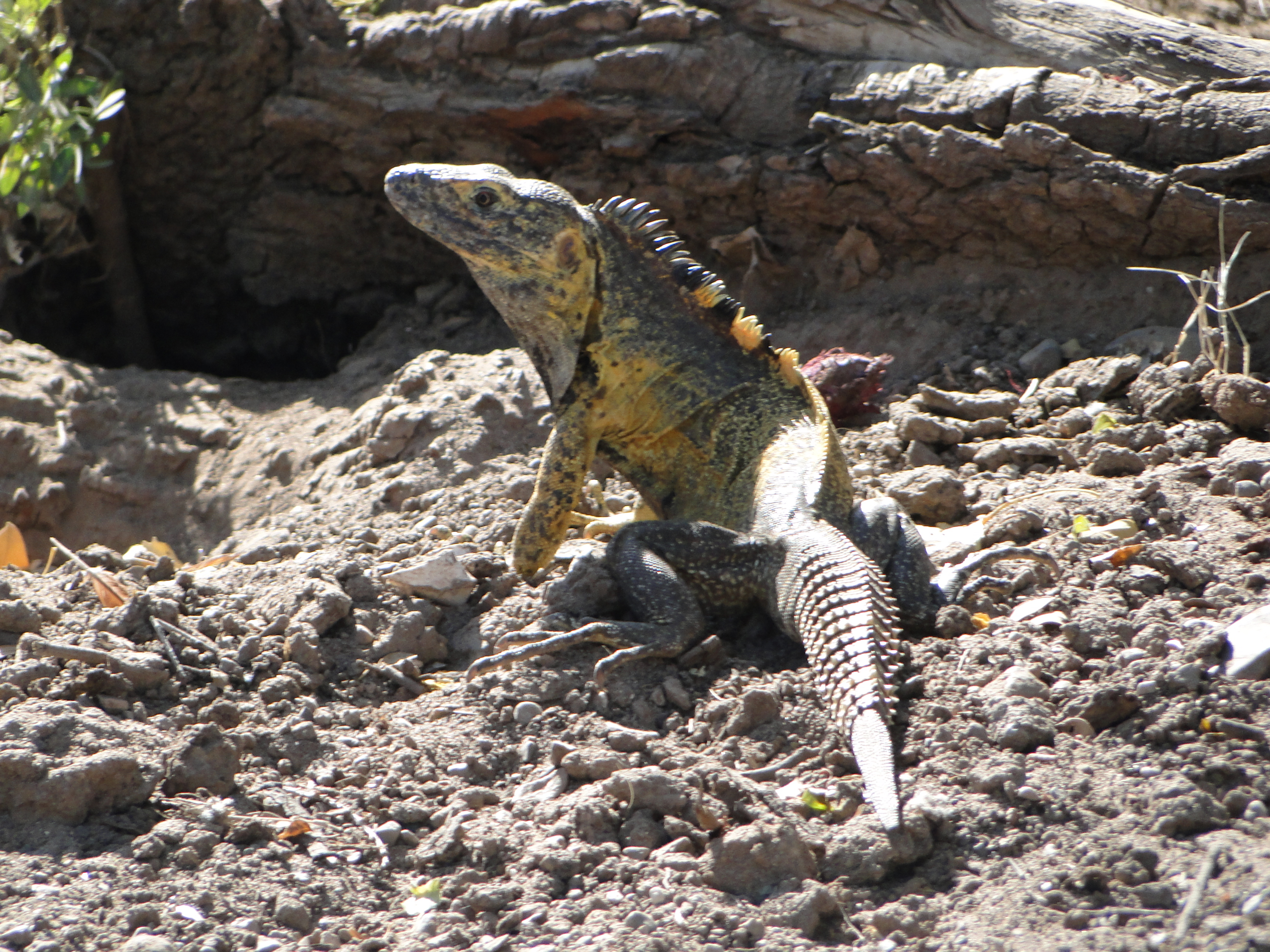
Male showing yellow coloring on the lateral sides of the body, Rio Tamazula, Parque Las Riberas, Culiacan, Sinaloa, Mexico (23 March 2010)

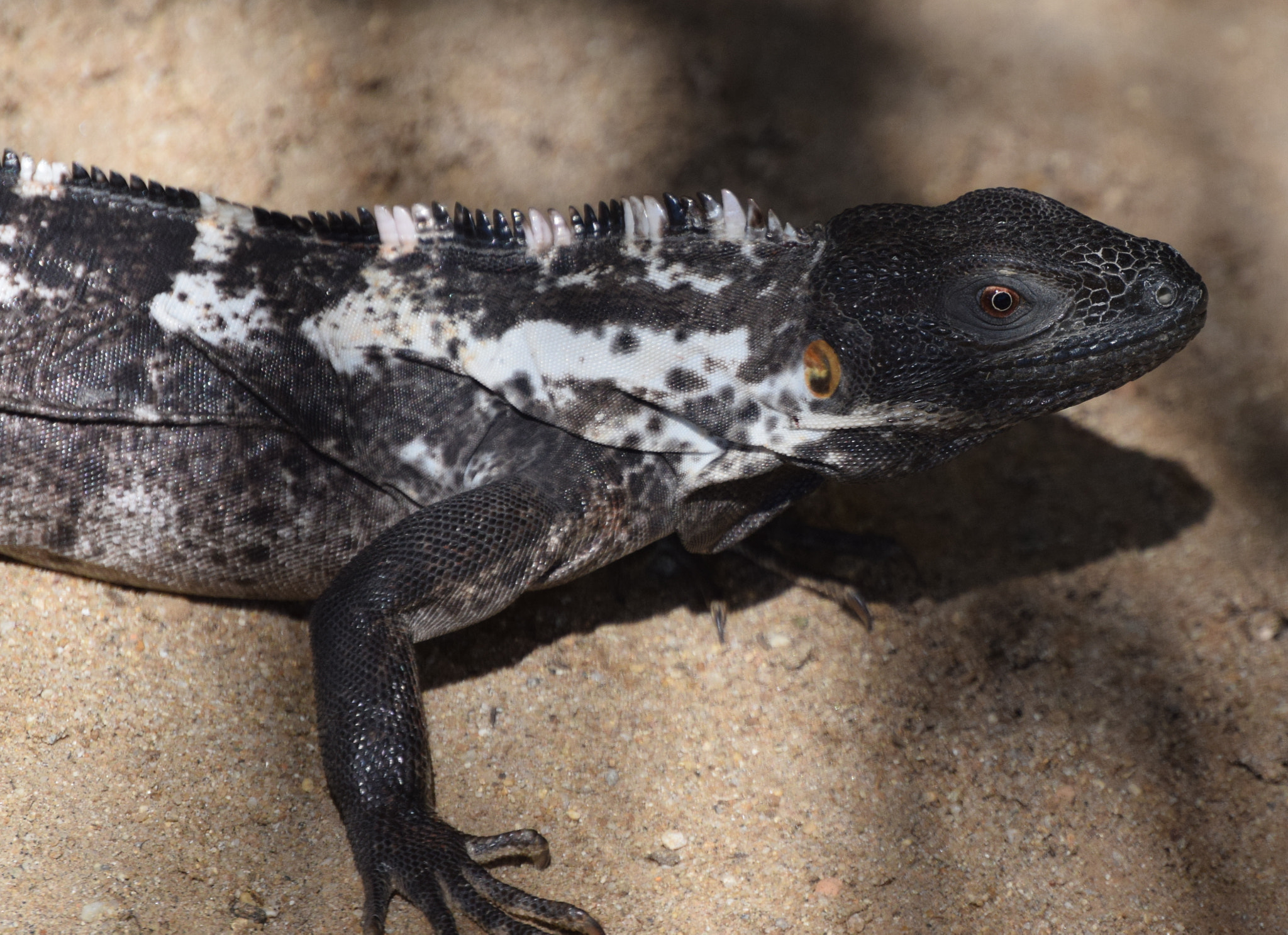
A female from Puerto Escondido, Oaxaca, Mexico (23 December 2016)

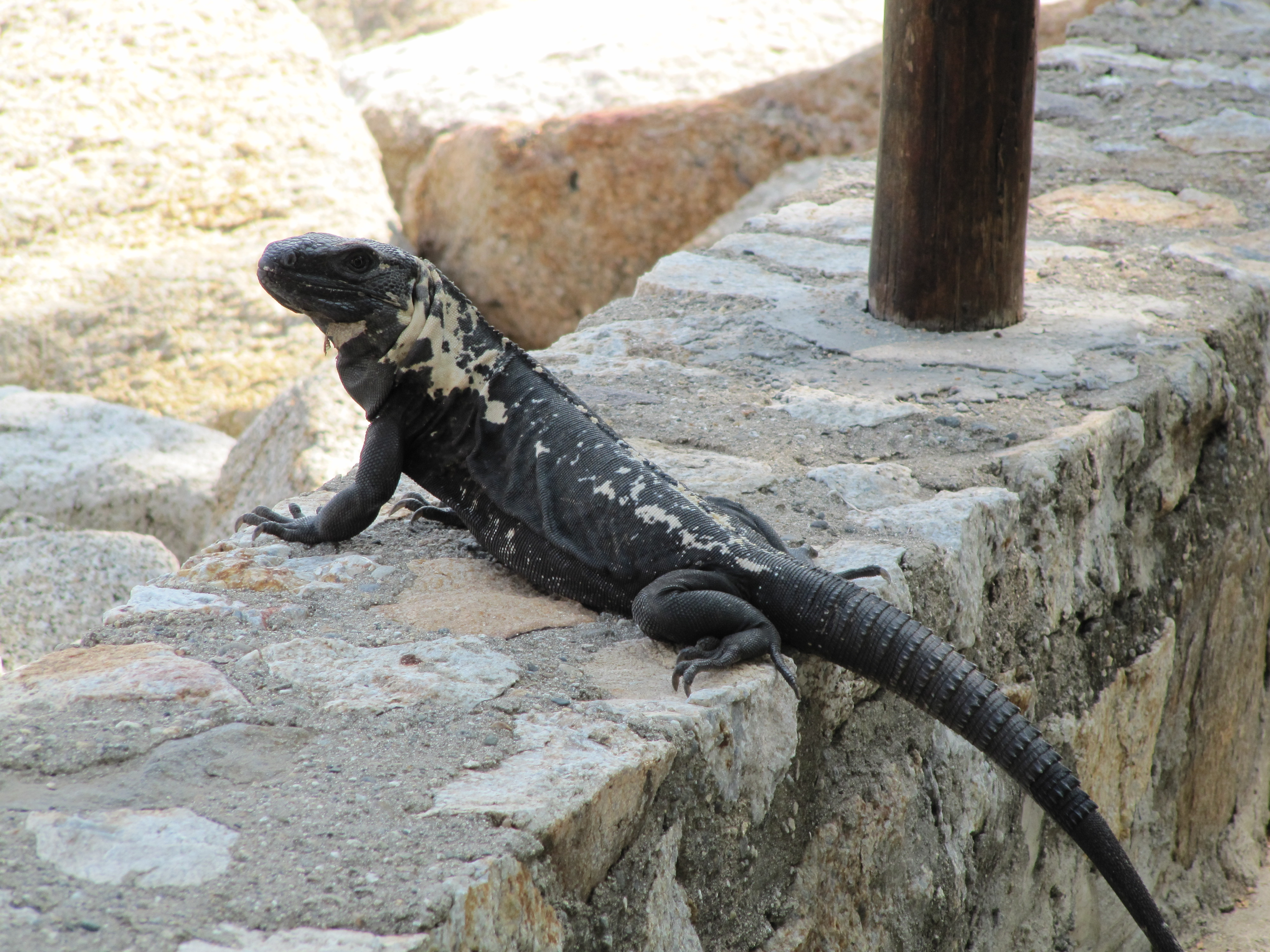
A female from the Huatulco Coast area of Oaxaca, Mexico (29 December 2010)

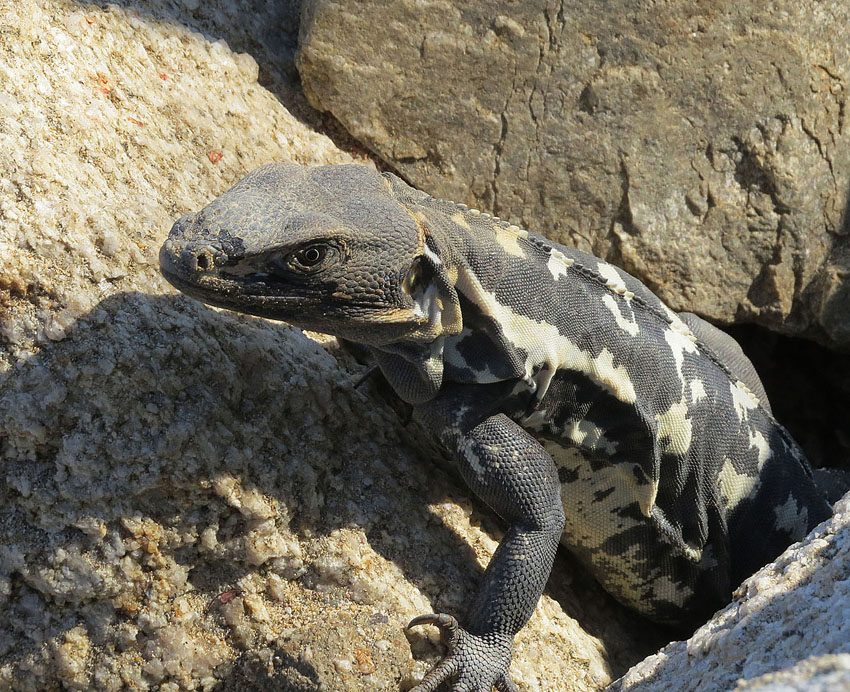
A female photographed in the Huatulco Coast area in Oaxaca, Mexico (2013)

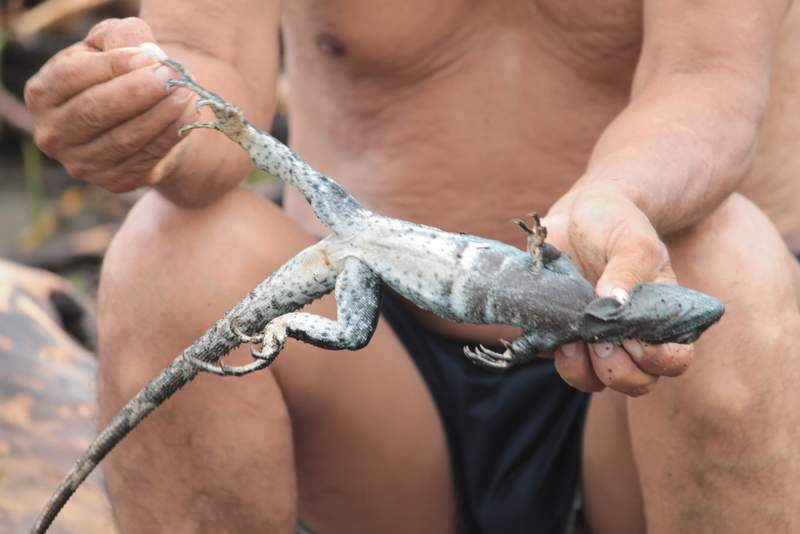
Ventral view of a Ctenosaura pectinata from the vicinity of Acapulco, Guerrero, Mexico (16 September 2013)

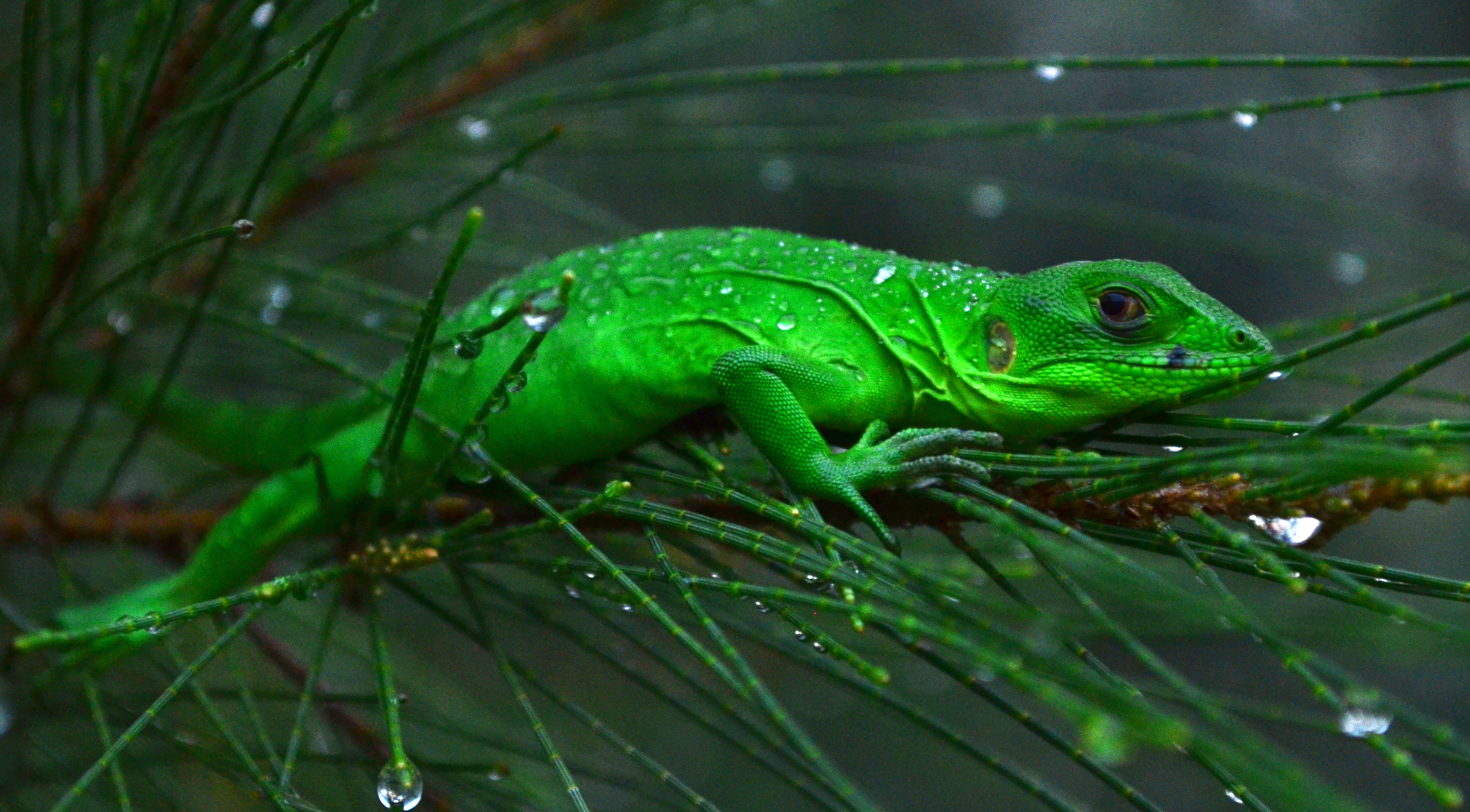
Juveniles are a bright green color as this one from the Bosque de la Primavera region of Jalisco, Mexico (2013)

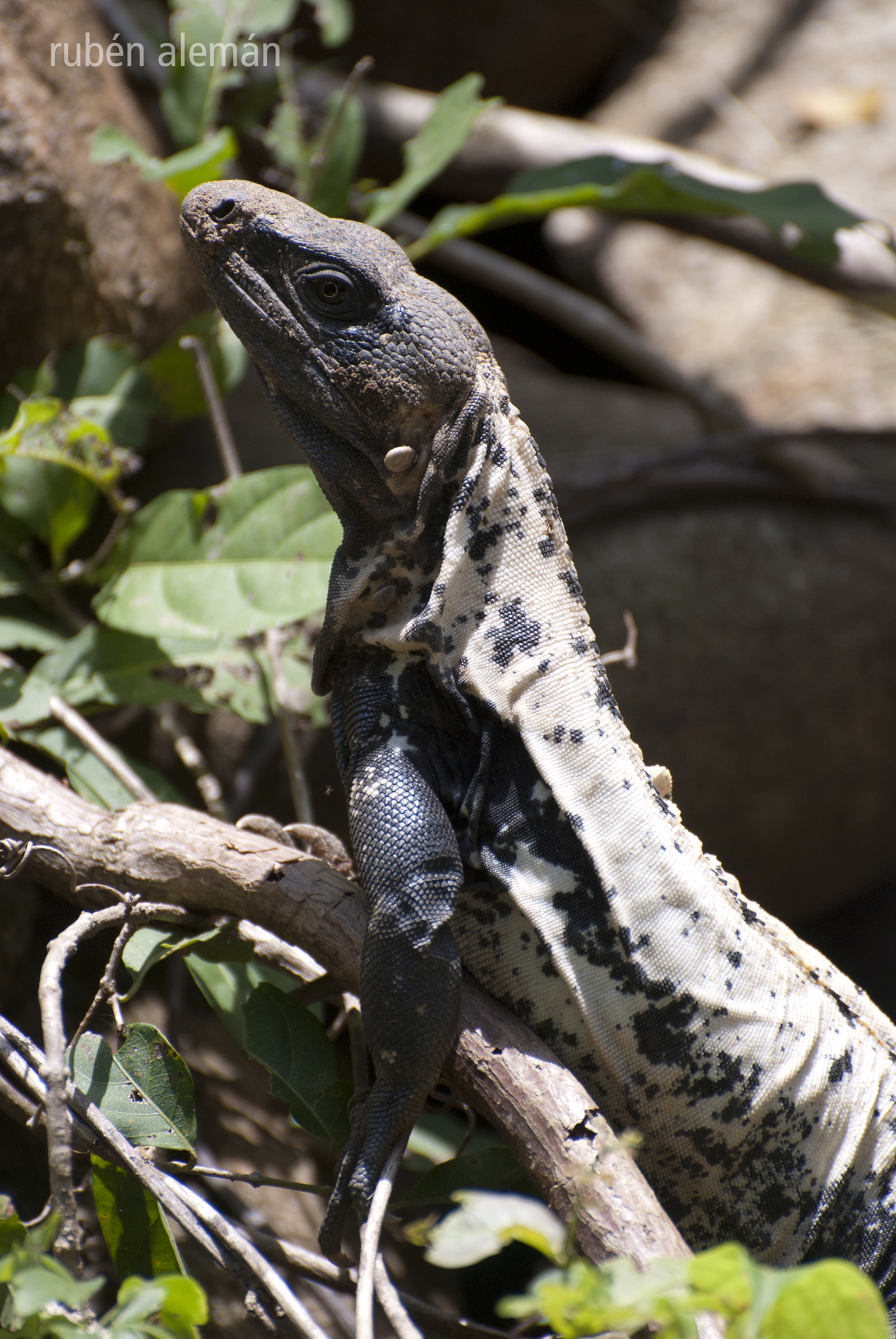
Ctenosaura pectinata from the area of Playa Escobilla, Oaxaca, Mexico (13 September 2010)
