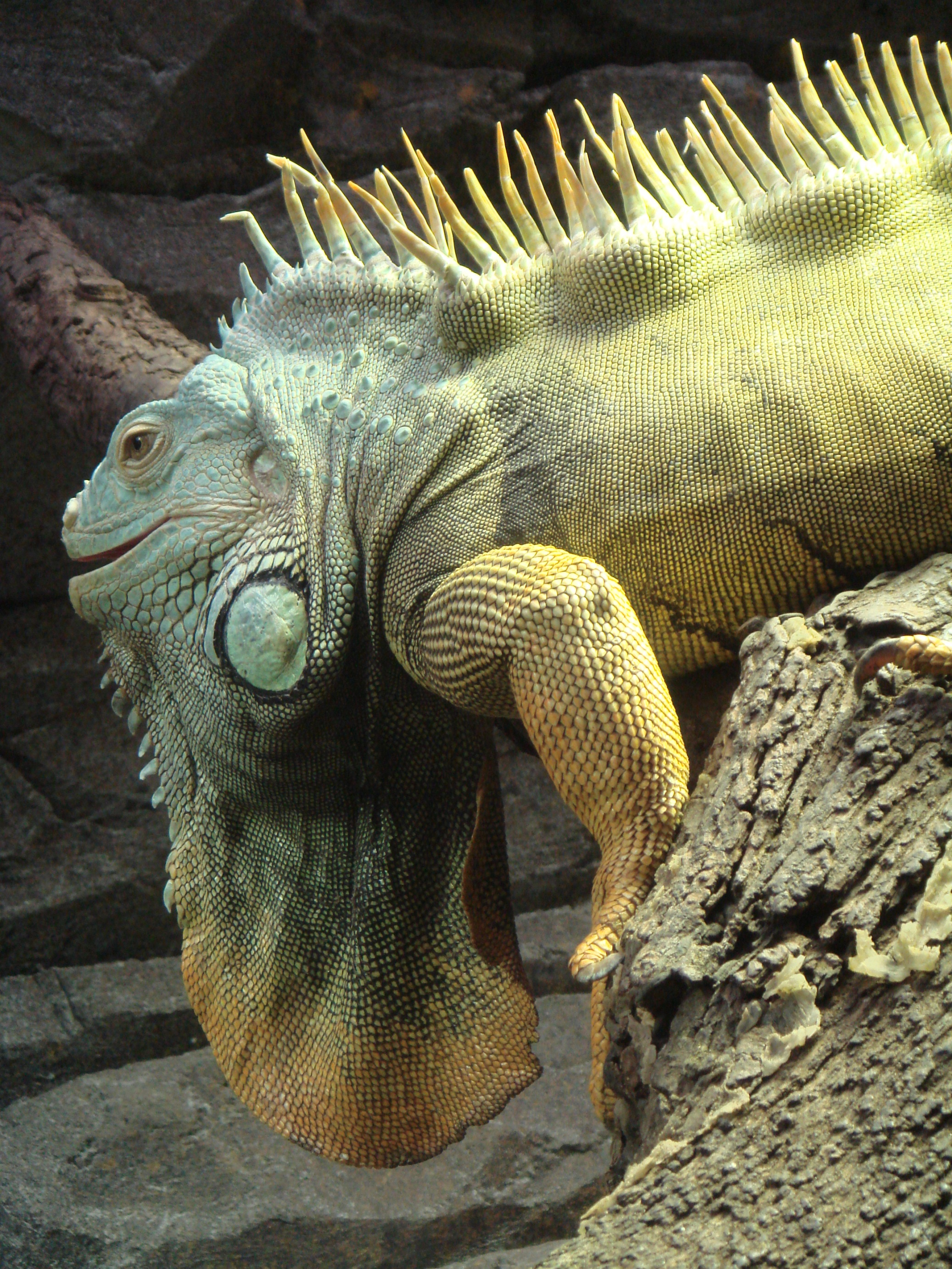

Scientific classification
- Kingdom: Animalia
- Phylum: Chordata
- Class: Reptilia
- Order: Squamata
- Suborder: Iguania
- Infraorder: Pleurodonta
- Family: Iguanidae; Oppel, 1811

Genera
- Amblyrhynchus; Brachylophus; Cachryx; Conolophus; Ctenosaura; Cyclura; Dipsosaurus; Iguana; Sauromalus

= Iguanidae =

Iguanids

Family of lizards

The Iguanidae is a family of lizards composed of the iguanas, chuckwallas, and their prehistoric relatives, including the widespread green iguana.

== Taxonomy ==
This family likely first appeared in Cenozoic, previously identified two Cretaceous genera (Pristiguana and Pariguana) are unlikely to belong to this family. The subfamily Iguaninae, which contains all modern genera, likely originated in the earliest Paleocene, about 62 million years ago. The most basal extant genus, Dipsosaurus, diverged from the rest of Iguaninae during the late Eocene, about 38 million years ago, with Brachylophus following a few million years later at about 35 million years ago, presumably after its dispersal event to the Pacific. All other modern iguana genera formed in the Neogene period.

A phylogenetic tree of Iguaninae is shown here:

- - Dipsosaurus
  - - Brachylophus
    - - Cyclura
      - - - Ctenosaura
          - - Cachryx
            - - Amblyrhynchus
              - Conolophus
        - - Iguana
          - Sauromalus

== Description ==
Iguanas and iguana-type species are diverse in terms of size, appearance, and habitat. They typically flourish in tropical, warm climates, such as regions of South America and islands in the Caribbean and in the Pacific. Iguanas typically possess dorsal spines across their back, a dewlap on the neck, sharp claws, a long whip-like tail, and a stocky, squat build. Most iguanas are arboreal, living in trees, but some species tend to be more terrestrial, which means they prefer the ground. Iguanas are typically herbivores and their diets vary based on what plant life is available within their habitat. Iguanas across many species remain oviparious, and exhibit little to no parental care when their eggs hatch. They do, however, display nest-guarding behavior. Like all extant non-avian reptiles, they are poikilothermic, and also rely on regular periods of basking under the sun to thermoregulate.

== Distribution ==
All but one of the modern iguana genera are native to the Americas, ranging from the deserts of the Southwestern United States through Mexico, Central America, and the Caribbean, to throughout South America down to northernmost Argentina. Some iguanas like I. iguana have spread from their native regions of Central and South America into many Pacific Islands, and even to Fiji, Japan, and Hawaiʻi, due to the exotic pet trade and illegal introductions into the ecosystems. Other iguanas, like the Galapagos pink iguana (C. marthae) are endemic only to specific regions on the Galapagos islands. The Grand Cayman blue iguana, C. lewisi, is endemic only to the Grand Cayman island, limited to a small wildlife reserve. The only non-American iguana species are the members of the genus Brachylophus and the extinct Lapitiguana, which are found on Fiji and formerly Tonga; their distribution is thought to be the result of the longest overwater dispersal event ever recorded for a vertebrate species, with them rafting over 8000 km across the Pacific from the Americas to the Fiji and Tonga.

== Extant genera ==
Image	Genus	Species
	Amblyrhynchus Bell, 1825 – marine iguana	Amblyrhynchus cristatus — Marine iguana Bell, 1825
	Brachylophus Cuvier, 1829 – Fijian/Tongan iguanas	Brachylophus fasciatus — Lau banded iguana (Brongniart, 1800); Brachylophus vitiensis — Fiji crested iguana Gibbons, 1981; Brachylophus bulabula — Fiji banded iguana Keogh, Edwards, Fisher, & Harlow, 2008; Brachylophus gau — Gau iguana Fisher, 2017
	Cachryx Cope, 1866 – spinytail iguanas	Cachryx alfredschmidti — Campeche spiny-tailed iguana (Köhler, 1995); Cachryx defensor — Yucatán spiny-tailed iguana (Cope, 1866)
	Conolophus Fitzinger, 1843 – Galápagos land iguanas	Conolophus pallidus — Barrington land iguana Heller, 1903; Conolophus subcristatus — Galápagos land iguana (Gray, 1831); Conolophus marthae — Galápagos pink land iguana Gentile & Snell, 2009
	Ctenosaura Wiegmann, 1828 – spiny-tailed iguanas	Ctenosaura acanthura — Mexican spiny-tailed iguana Shaw, 1802; Ctenosaura alfredschmidti — Campeche spiny-tailed iguana (Köhler, 1995); Ctenosaura bakeri — Baker's spiny-tailed iguana Stejneger, 1901; Ctenosaura clarki — Balsas spiny-tailed iguana Bailey, 1928; Ctenosaura conspicuosa — San Esteban spiny-tailed iguana (Dickerson, 1919); Ctenosaura defensor — Yucatán spiny-tailed iguana (Cope, 1866); Ctenosaura flavidorsalis Yellow-backed spiny-tailed iguana Köhler & Klemmer, 1994; Ctenosaura hemilopha — Baja California spiny-tailed iguana (Cope, 1863); Ctenosaura macrolopha — Sonoran spiny-tailed iguana Smith, 1972; Ctenosaura melanosterna — Black-chested spiny-tailed iguana Buckley & Axtell, 1997; Ctenosaura nolascensis — Nolasco spiny-tailed iguana Smith, 1972; Ctenosaura oaxacana — Oaxacan spiny-tailed iguana Köhler & Hasbun, 2001; Ctenosaura oedirhina — Roatán spiny-tailed iguana De Queiroz, 1987; Ctenosaura palearis — Motagua spiny-tailed iguana Stejneger, 1899; Ctenosaura pectinata — Western spiny-tailed iguana (Wiegmann, 1834); Ctenosaura quinquecarinata — Five-keeled spiny-tailed iguana (Gray, 1842); Ctenosaura similis — Black spiny-tailed iguana (Gray, 1831)
	Cyclura Harlan, 1825 – West Indian rock iguanas	Cyclura carinata — Turks and Caicos rock iguana Harlan, 1825; Cyclura carinata bartschi — Bartsch's iguana Cochran, 1931; Cyclura collei — Jamaican iguana Gray, 1845; Cyclura cornuta — Rhinoceros iguana (Bonnaterre, 1789); †Cyclura cornuta onchiopsis — Navassa Island iguana; Cyclura cychlura — Northern Bahamian Rock Iguana (Cuvier, 1829); Cyclura cychlura cychlura — Andros Island iguana (Cuvier, 1829); Cyclura cychlura figginsi — Exuma Island iguana Barbour, 1923; Cyclura cychlura inornata — Allen Cays iguana (Barbour & Noble, 1916); Cyclura lewisi — Blue iguana (Grant, 1940); Cyclura nubila — Cuban iguana (Gray, 1831); Cyclura nubila caymanensis — Lesser Caymans iguana (Barbour & Noble, 1916); Cyclura pinguis — Anegada ground iguana Barbour, 1917; Cyclura ricordii — Ricord's iguana (Duméril & Bibron, 1837); Cyclura rileyi — San Salvador iguana Stejneger, 1903; Cyclura rileyi rileyi — Central Bahamian Rock Iguana Stejneger, 1903; Cyclura rileyi cristata — White Cay iguana (Schmidt, 1920); Cyclura rileyi nuchalis — Acklins iguana Barbour and Noble, 1916; Cyclura stejnegeri — Mona ground Iguana Barbour and Noble, 1916
	Dipsosaurus Hallowell, 1854 – desert iguanas	Dipsosaurus dorsalis — Desert iguana (Baird and Girard, 1852); Dipsosaurus catalinensis — Catalina desert iguana (Van Denburgh, 1922)
	Iguana Laurenti, 1768 – green and Lesser Antillean iguanas	Iguana delicatissima — Lesser Antillean iguana Laurenti, 1768; Iguana iguana — Green iguana (Linnaeus, 1758); Iguana iguana insularis — Grenadines horned iguana; Iguana iguana melanoderma — Saban black iguana; Iguana iguana sanctaluciae — St. Lucia Horned Iguana
	Sauromalus Dumeril, 1856 – chuckwallas	Sauromalus ater — Common chuckwalla Dumeril, 1856; Sauromalus hispidus — Angel Island chuckwalla Stejneger, 1891; Sauromalus klauberi — Spotted chuckwalla Shaw, 1941; Sauromalus slevini — Monserrat chuckwalla Van Denburgh, 1922; Sauromalus varius — Pinto chuckwalla Dickerson, 1919

== Fossils ==
Image	Genus	Species
	Armandisaurus Norell & de Queiroz, 1991	† Armandisaurus explorator
	Lapitiguana Pregill & Worthy, 2003	† Lapitiguana impensa
	Pumilia Norell 1989	† Pumilia novaceki

Cretaceous Pristiguana brasiliensis and Pariguana lancensis are later excluded from the family.

== Classification ==
Several classification schemes have been used to define the structure of this family. The "historical" classification recognized all New World iguanians, plus Brachylophus and the Madagascar oplurines, as informal groups and not as formal subfamilies.

Frost and Etheridge (1989) formally recognized these informal groupings as families.

Macey et al. (1997), in their analysis of molecular data for iguanian lizards recovered a monophyletic Iguanidae and formally recognized the eight families proposed by Frost and Etheridge (1989) as subfamilies of Iguanidae.

Schulte et al. (2003) reanalyzed the morphological data of Frost and Etheridge in combination with molecular data for all major groups of Iguanidae and recovered a monophyletic Iguanidae, but the subfamilies Polychrotinae and Tropidurinae were not monophyletic.

Townsend et al. (2011), Wiens et al. (2012) and Pyron et al. (2013), in the most comprehensive phylogenies published to date, recognized most groups at family level, resulting in a narrower definition of Iguanidae.

=== Historical classification ===
Family Iguanidae

- Informal grouping anoloids: anoles, leiosaurs, Polychrus
- Informal grouping basiliscines: casquehead lizards
- Informal grouping crotaphytines: collared and leopard lizards
- Informal grouping iguanines: marine, Fijian, Galapagos land, spinytail, rock, desert, green, and chuckwalla iguanas
- Informal grouping morunasaurs: wood lizards, clubtails
- Informal grouping oplurines: Madagascan iguanids
- Informal grouping sceloporines: earless, spiny, tree, side-blotched and horned lizards
- Informal grouping tropidurines: curly-tailed lizards, South American swifts, neotropical ground lizards

=== Frost et al. (1989) classification of iguanas ===
Family Corytophanidae
Family Crotaphytidae
Family Hoplocercidae
Family Iguanidae

- Genus Amblyrhynchus – marine iguana
- Genus Brachylophus – Fijian/Tongan iguanas
- Genus Cachryx – spinytail iguanas
- Genus Conolophus – Galápagos land iguanas
- Genus Ctenosaura – spinytail iguanas
- Genus Cyclura – West Indian rock iguanas
- Genus Dipsosaurus – desert iguana
- Genus Iguana – green and Lesser Antillean iguanas
- Genus Sauromalus – chuckwallas
- Genus Armandisaurus (extinct chuckwalla)
- Genus Lapitiguana (extinct giant Fijian iguana)
- Genus Pumilia (extinct Palm Springs iguana)
- Genus Pristiguana (Cretaceous Brazilian iguana)

Family Opluridae
Family Phrynosomatidae
Family Polychridae
Family Tropiduridae

=== Macey et al. (1997) classification of Iguanidae ===
Family Iguanidae

- Subfamily Corytophaninae: casquehead lizards
- Subfamily Crotaphytinae: collared and leopard lizards
- Subfamily Hoplocercinae: wood lizards, clubtails
- Subfamily Iguaninae: marine, Fijian, Galapagos land, spinytail, rock, desert, green, and chuckwalla iguanas
- Subfamily Oplurinae: Madagascan iguanids
- Subfamily Phrynosomatinae: earless, spiny, tree, side-blotched and horned lizards
- Subfamily Polychrotinae: anoles, leiosaurs, Polychrus
- Subfamily Tropidurinae: curly-tailed lizards, neotropical ground lizards, South American swifts

=== Schulte et al. (2003) classification of Iguanidae ===
Here families and subfamilies are proposed as clade names, but may be recognized under the traditional Linnean nomenclature.

Iguanidae

- Corytophaninae: casquehead lizards
- Crotaphytinae: collared and leopard lizards
- Hoplocercinae: wood lizards, clubtails
- Iguaninae: marine, Fijian, Galapagos land, spinytail, rock, desert, green, and chuckwalla iguanas
- Oplurinae: Madagascan iguanids
- Phrynosomatinae: earless, spiny, tree, side-blotched and horned lizards
- Polychrotinae: anoles, leiosaurs, Polychrus

- subclade of Polychrotinae Anolis: anoles
- subclade of Polychrotinae Leiosaurini: leiosaurs

- subclade of Leiosaurini Leiosaurae:
- subclade of Leiosaurini Anisolepae:

- subclade of Polychrotinae Polychrus

- Tropidurinae: curly-tailed lizards, neotropical ground lizards, South American swifts

- subclade of Tropidurinae Leiocephalus: curly-tailed lizards
- subclade of Tropidurinae Liolaemini: South American swifts
- subclade of Tropidurinae Tropidurini: neotropical ground lizards

=== Townsend et al. (2011), Wiens et al. (2012) and Pyron et al. (2013) classification of Iguanidae ===
- Family Corytophanidae
- Family Crotaphytidae
- Family Dactyloidae
- Family Hoplocercidae
- Family Iguanidae
- Family Leiocephalidae
- Family Leiosauridae
- Family Liolaemidae
- Family Opluridae
- Family Phrynosomatidae
- Family Polychrotidae
- Family Tropiduridae
