= Catherine L. Malone =

American biologist and author

Academic background
- Education: Texas A&M; University of California, Santa Cruz; Santa Monica College
- Doctoral advisor: Rodney L. Honeycutt

Academic work
- Discipline: biogeography genetic variation

Catherine L. Malone is an American biologist and an author and co-author of biological subjects including works on biogeography and genetic variation.

== Academic background ==
Catherine Malone was a graduate of Texas A&M University in August 2000, from which she earned her PhD. She previously earned her bachelor's degree from University of California, Santa Cruz in December 1994. Two years earlier she completed an associate degree from Santa Monica College in California.

== Positions ==
=== Teaching positions ===
From November 2000 to 2001 she was a guest lecturer for the Department of Biology/Biochemistry, in Texas A&M University, on a work called Population Genetics. From January to August 2001 she worked for Conservation of St. Lucian Iguanas as an outreach and education coordinator at the Ministry of Agriculture, Forestry and Fisheries. From the same month of the same year, she worked as course instructor for Department of Forestry and Natural Resources, of Purdue University the position of which ended in April 2002.

=== Work positions ===
From January 1995 to the September of the same year she was a scientific aide at the California Department of Fish and Game in Monterey, California, where she worked on a salmonid habitat restoration project, which was focused on habitat restoration of Salmonidae species. From March 1995 to July 1996, she worked as a research technician in the Conservation Genetics Lab, that was a part of Hopkins Marine Station in Monterey. From September 1997 to December 2000, she was a graduate research assistant for Faculty of Genetics in the Department of Animal Science at Texas A&M University. From November 1996 to present she works as a field research assistant in various Caribbean nations, such as Dominican Republic, Montserrat, St. Eustatius, and Saba, St. Lucia.

== Publications ==
Currently she published one work:

- 2000 — Phylogenetics, biogeography, and conservation of Caribbean iguanas (Cyclura and Iguana)

And wrote others with co-authors:

- 2000 — Biogeography and Systematics of the Caribbean rock iguana (Cyclura): implications for conservation and insights into the biogeographic history of the West Indies
- 2002 — Genetic Contributions to the Conservation of Caribbean Iguanas. In: Evolution, Behavioral Ecology, and Conservation of Iguanas

She also has four works in press, two of which are co-authored:

- Conservation Genetics of the Bahaman Iguana, Cyclura Cychlura. Conservation Genetics
- Patterns of Reproductive Success Determined by Microsatellite Analysis in a Translocated Cyclura Iguana Population
- Microsatellite Loci for Neotropical Tent Bats (Uroderma)
- Distribution of Genetic Variation in Pronghorn Antelope
