= Joseph Harvey Riley =

American ornithologist (1873–1941)

Joseph Harvey Riley (September 19, 1873 – December 17, 1941) was an American ornithologist.

Born in Falls Church, Virginia, Riley was employed at the Smithsonian Institution from 1896 until his death, becoming Associate Curator of the Division of Birds in 1932.

A species of Bahamian iguana, Cyclura rileyi, is named in his honor.

The following subspecies of birds are named in his honor: Broderipus chinensis rileyi, Coracina temminchii rileyi, Coccyzus minor rileyi, Myophonus caeruleus rileyi, Strix indranee rileyi, and Pipilo alleni rileyi.
