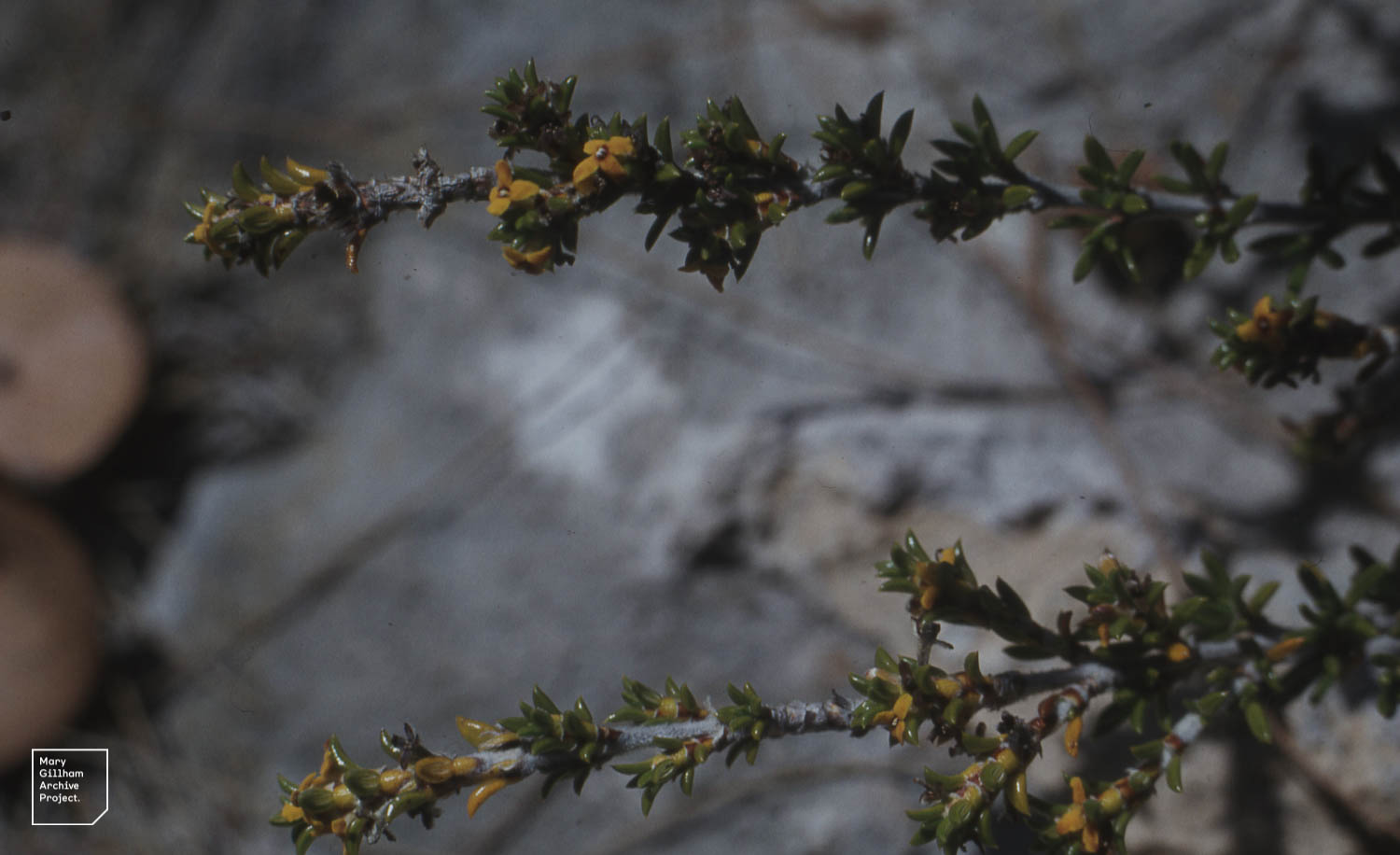

Conservation status
- Least Concern (IUCN 3.1)

Scientific classification
- Kingdom: Plantae
- Clade: Embryophytes
- Clade: Tracheophytes
- Clade: Spermatophytes
- Clade: Angiosperms
- Clade: Eudicots
- Clade: Asterids
- Order: Gentianales
- Family: Rubiaceae
- Subfamily: Cinchonoideae
- Tribe: Rondeletieae
- Genus: Rachicallis; DC.
- Species: R. americana

Binomial name
- Rachicallis americana (Jacq.) Hitchc.

Synonyms
- Buchnera rupestris (Sw.) Sw.; Hedyotis americana Jacq. (1760); Hedyotis rupestris Sw.; Oldenlandia rupestris (Sw.) Lam.; Rachicallis maritima K.Schum.; Rachicallis rupestris (Sw.) DC.

= Rachicallis =

Genus of plants

Rachicallis is a genus of flowering plants belonging to the family Rubiaceae. It includes a single species, Rachicallis americana, a shrub native to southeastern Mexico and to Cuba, Hispaniola, Jamaica, the Cayman Islands, the Bahamas, and the Turks and Caicos Islands in the Caribbean.

The species was first described as Hedyotis americana by Nikolaus Joseph von Jacquin in 1760. In 1893 A. S. Hitchcock placed the species in genus Rachicallis as R. americana.
