= Chuckawalla =

Chuckawalla may refer to:

== People ==
- Chuckawalla Bill, Spanish–American War and WW I veteran, prospector, cook, and vagabond

== Locations ==
- Chuckwalla Mountains, in the Colorado Desert, California
- Chuckawalla Valley State Prison, near Blythe, California
- Little Chuckwalla Mountains, in the Colorado Desert, California

== Animals ==
- Chuckwalla, a genus of lizards found in southwestern United States and northern Mexico
  - Angel Island chuckwalla, a species of chuckwalla
  - Spotted chuckwalla (alt. Catalina Island chuckwalla), a species of chuckwalla
  - Peninsular chuckwalla, species of chuckwalla
  - San Esteban chuckwalla, a species of chuckwalla
