= San Lorenzo Island =

San Lorenzo Island may refer to:

- San Lorenzo Island, Peru, the largest island of the country.
- San Lorenzo Island, Mexico, an island in the Gulf of California.
