= Isla Willard =

Island in Mexico

- Location within Mexico

Geography
- Location: Gulf of California
- Coordinates: 29°48′55.25″N 114°23′9.28″W
- Highest elevation: 130 m (430 ft)

Administration
- Mexico
- State: Baja California

Demographics
- Population: uninhabited

Isla Willard, is an island in the Gulf of California east of the Baja California Peninsula. The island is uninhabited and is part of the Mexicali Municipality.

== Biology ==
Isla Willard has two species of reptile, including Sauromalus ater (Common Chuckwalla) and Uta stansburiana (Common Side-blotched Lizard).
