= Isla Pond =

Island in Mexico

- Location within Mexico

Geography
- Location: Gulf of California
- Coordinates: 29°03′55.71″N 113°05′15.04″W
- Highest elevation: 20 m (70 ft)

Administration
- Mexico
- State: Baja California

Demographics
- Population: uninhabited

Isla Pond, is an island in the Gulf of California east of the Baja California Peninsula. The island is uninhabited and is part of the Mexicali Municipality.

== Biology ==
Isla Pond has five species of reptile, including Aspidoscelis tigris (Tiger Whiptail), Crotalus ruber (Red Diamond Rattlesnake), Phyllodactylus nocticolus (Peninsular Leaf-toed Gecko), Sauromalus hispidus (Spiny Chuckwalla), and Uta stansburiana (Common Side-blotched Lizard).
