= Crotalus lorenzoensis =

Conservation status
- Least Concern (IUCN 3.1)

Scientific classification
- Kingdom: Animalia
- Phylum: Chordata
- Class: Reptilia
- Order: Squamata
- Suborder: Serpentes
- Family: Viperidae
- Genus: Crotalus
- Species: C. lorenzoensis

Binomial name
- Crotalus lorenzoensis Radcliffe & Maslin, 1975

Synonyms
- Crotalus ruber lorenzoensis Radcliffe & Maslin, 1975; C[rotalus]. e[xsul]. lorenzoensis — Grismer, McGuire & Hollingsworth, 1994; Crotalus lorenzoensis — Grismer, 1999

Species of snake

Crotalus lorenzoensis is a species of pit viper.

== Description ==
These vipers are usually smaller than their counterparts on the mainland.

== Geographic range ==
C. lorenzoensis is only known from the type locality, which is San Lorenzo Island, thus making it an endemic species.

== Habitat ==
The snakes live mainly in rocky areas and arroyo bottoms, sometimes in dunes near the coast and in cavities formed by adjacent boulders.

== Conservation status ==
This species is classified as "Least Concern" (LC) on the IUCN Red List of Threatened Species.
