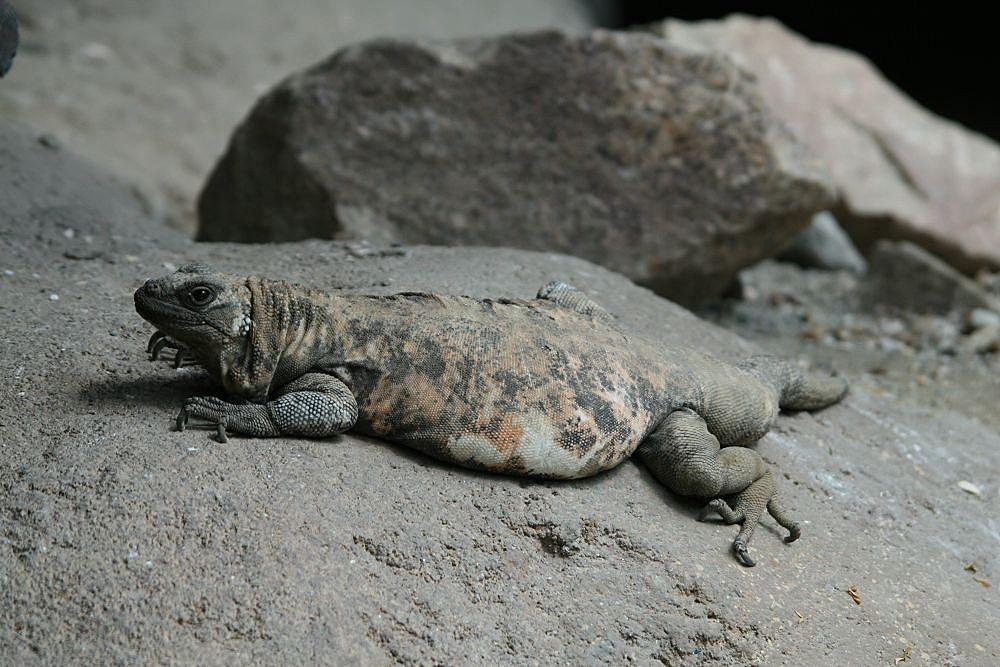

Conservation status
- Vulnerable (IUCN 3.1)

Scientific classification
- Kingdom: Animalia
- Phylum: Chordata
- Class: Reptilia
- Order: Squamata
- Suborder: Iguania
- Family: Iguanidae
- Genus: Sauromalus
- Species: S. klauberi

Binomial name
- Sauromalus klauberi Shaw, 1941

= Sauromalus klauberi =

Species of lizard

Sauromalus klauberi, commonly called the Catalina chuckwalla or the spotted chuckwalla, is a species of chuckwalla, a lizard in the family Iguanidae. It is endemic to Mexico The species was first described in 1941.

== Geographic range and habitat ==
S. klauberi is endemic to Isla Santa Catalina in Baja California, Mexico. Adults occur primarily on rocky hillsides, on bluffs, and in arroyo bottoms.

== Etymology ==
S. klauberi is named in honor of Laurence Monroe Klauber, an American amateur naturalist.

== Description ==
S. klauberi is oviparous, laying between 13–15 eggs. Adults have a median snout–vent length of 14.4 cm (5.7 in).
