= Isla San Lorenzo Norte =

Island in Mexico

- Location within Mexico

Geography
- Location: Gulf of California
- Coordinates: 28°41′42.15″N 112°54′54.68″W
- Highest elevation: 180 m (590 ft)

Administration
- Mexico
- State: Baja California

Demographics
- Population: uninhabited

Isla San Lorenzo Norte is an island in the Gulf of California east of the Baja California Peninsula. The island is uninhabited and is part of the Mexicali Municipality. The much larger Isla San Lorenzo Sur is located immediately southeast of Isla San Lorenzo Norte.

== Biology ==
Isla San Lorenzo Norte has five species of reptiles: Aspidoscelis cana (Isla Salsipuedes whiptail), Lampropeltis californiae (California kingsnake), Phyllodactylus nocticolus (peninsular leaf-toed gecko), Sauromalus hispidus (spiny chuckwalla), and Uta antiqua (San Lorenzo Islands side-blotched lizard).
