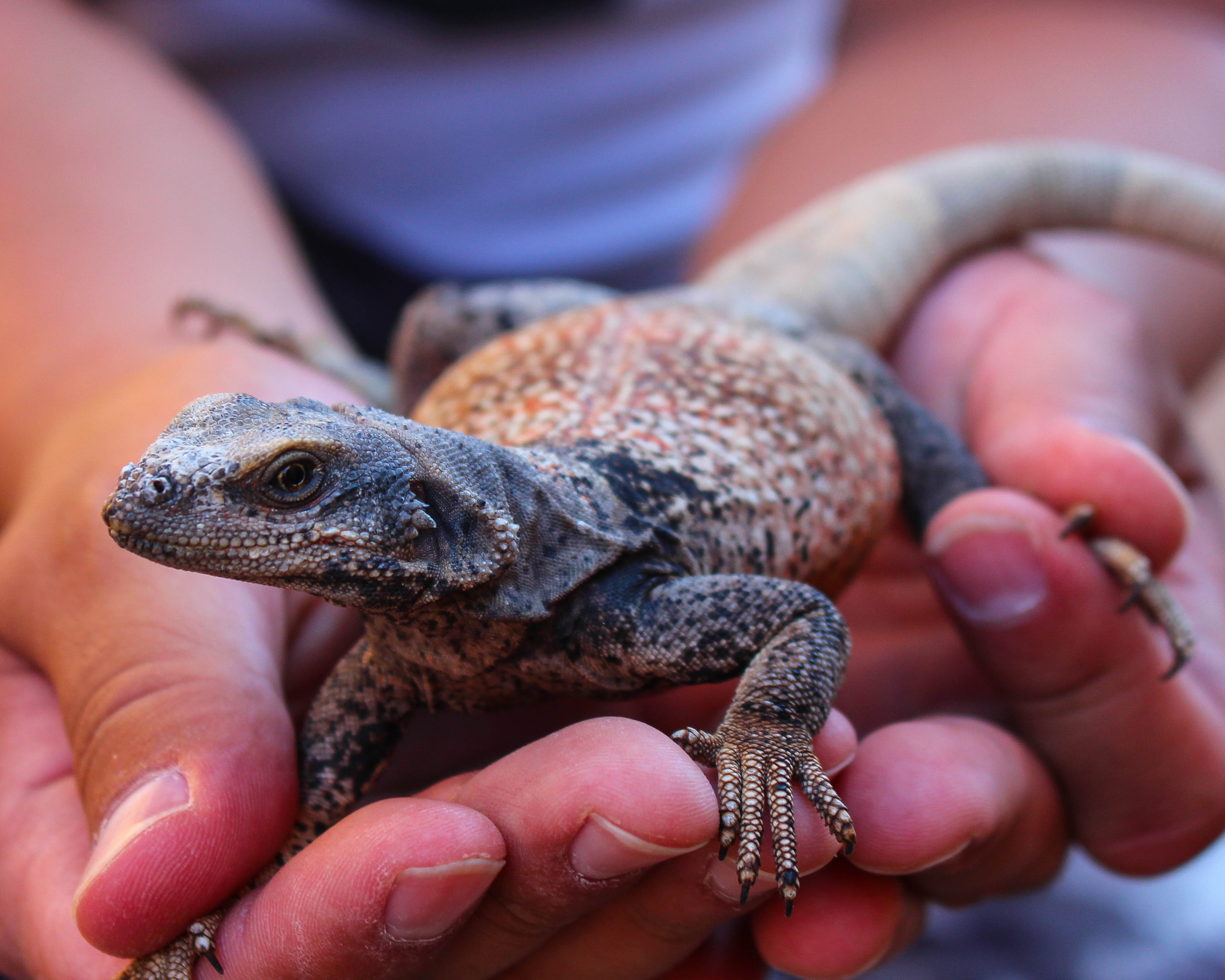
- Common chuckwalla, S. ater (male)
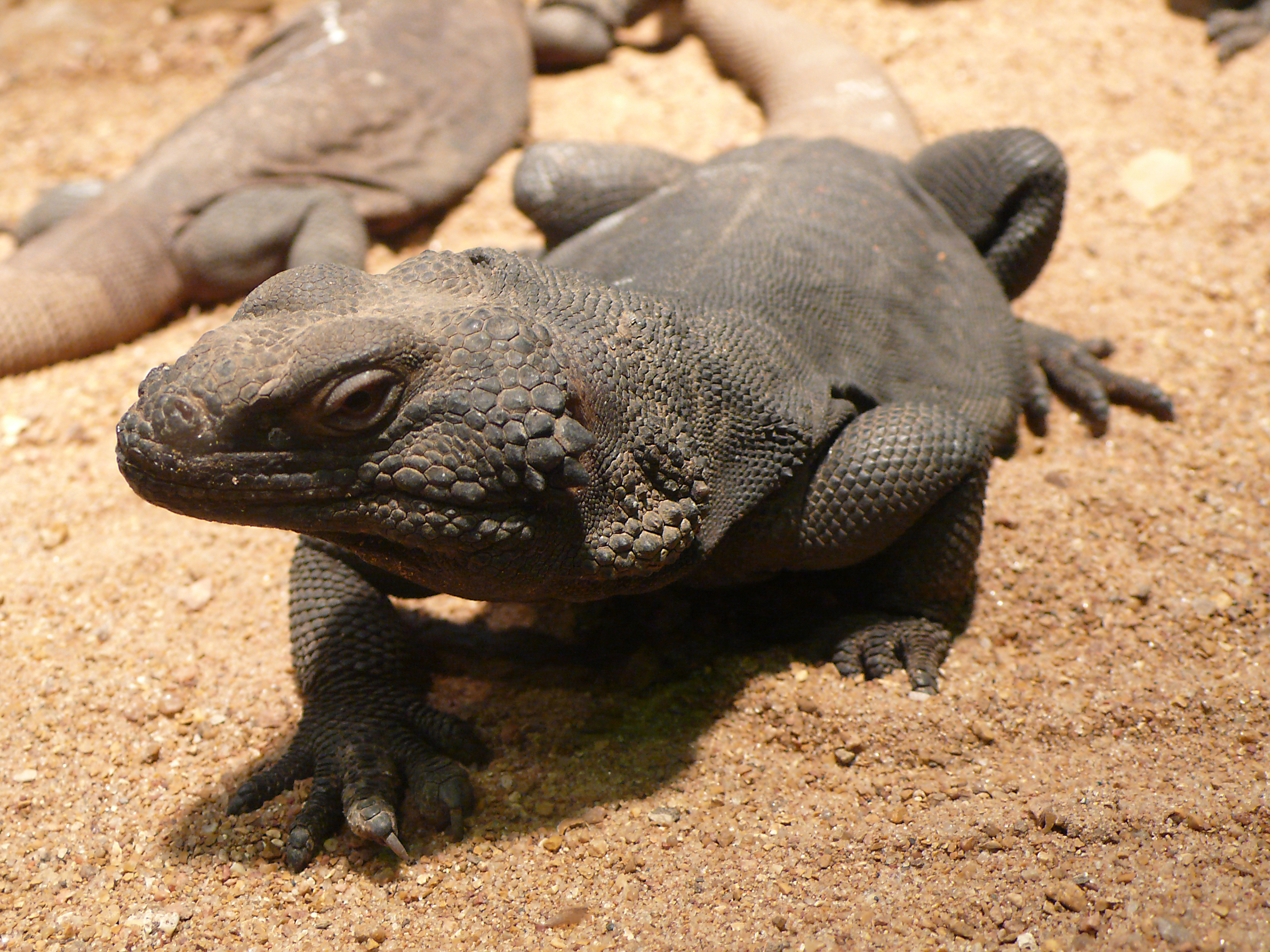
- Common chuckwalla, S. ater (female)

Scientific classification
- Kingdom: Animalia
- Phylum: Chordata
- Class: Reptilia
- Order: Squamata
- Suborder: Iguania
- Family: Iguanidae
- Genus: Sauromalus; Dumeril, 1856

Type species
- Sauromalus ater Dumeril, 1856

Species
- Sauromalus ater (including Sauromalus obesus); Sauromalus hispidus Sauromalus klauberi Sauromalus slevini Sauromalus varius

= Chuckwalla =

Chuckwalla Sauromalus

Genus of lizards

Chuckwallas are lizards found primarily in arid regions of the southwestern United States and northern Mexico. Some are found on coastal islands. The five species of chuckwallas are all placed within the genus Sauromalus; they are part of the iguanid family, Iguanidae.

== Taxonomy and etymology ==
The generic name, Sauromalus, is said to be a combination of two ancient Greek words: sauros meaning "lizard" and homalos (ὁμαλός) meaning "flat". The common name "chuckwalla" derives from the Shoshone word tcaxxwal or Cahuilla čaxwal, transcribed by Spaniards as chacahuala.

=== Extant species ===
Image	Scientific name	Common name	Distribution
	Sauromalus ater	common chuckwalla	eastern California, Utah, Arizona, and Nevada south to Baja California and Sonora.
	Sauromalus hispidus	Angel Island chuckwalla	Isla Ángel de la Guarda and 10 smaller islands in the Gulf of California
	Sauromalus klauberi	Santa Catalina chuckwalla / Spotted chuckwalla	Baja California
	Sauromalus slevini	Monserrat chuckwalla	islands in the Sea of Cortés: Isla del Carmen, Isla Coronados, and Isla Monserrate
	Sauromalus varius	San Esteban chuckwalla / piebald chuckwalla / pinto chuckwalla	endemic to San Esteban Island in the Gulf of California

== Description ==
Chuckwallas are stocky, wide-bodied lizards with flattened midsections and prominent bellies. Their tails are thick, tapering to a blunt tip. Loose folds of skin characterize the neck and sides of their bodies, which are covered in small, coarsely granular scales. The common chuckwalla (Sauromalus ater) measures 15.75 inches (40.0 cm) long, whereas insular species such as the San Esteban chuckwalla of San Esteban Island (Sauromalus varius) can measure as long as 30 inches (76 cm)

They are sexually dimorphic, with males having reddish-pink to orange, yellow, or light gray bodies and black heads, shoulders, and limbs; females and juveniles have bodies with scattered spots or contrasting bands of light and dark in shades of gray or yellow. Males are generally larger than females and possess well-developed femoral pores located on the inner sides of their thighs; these pores produce secretions believed to play a role in marking territory.

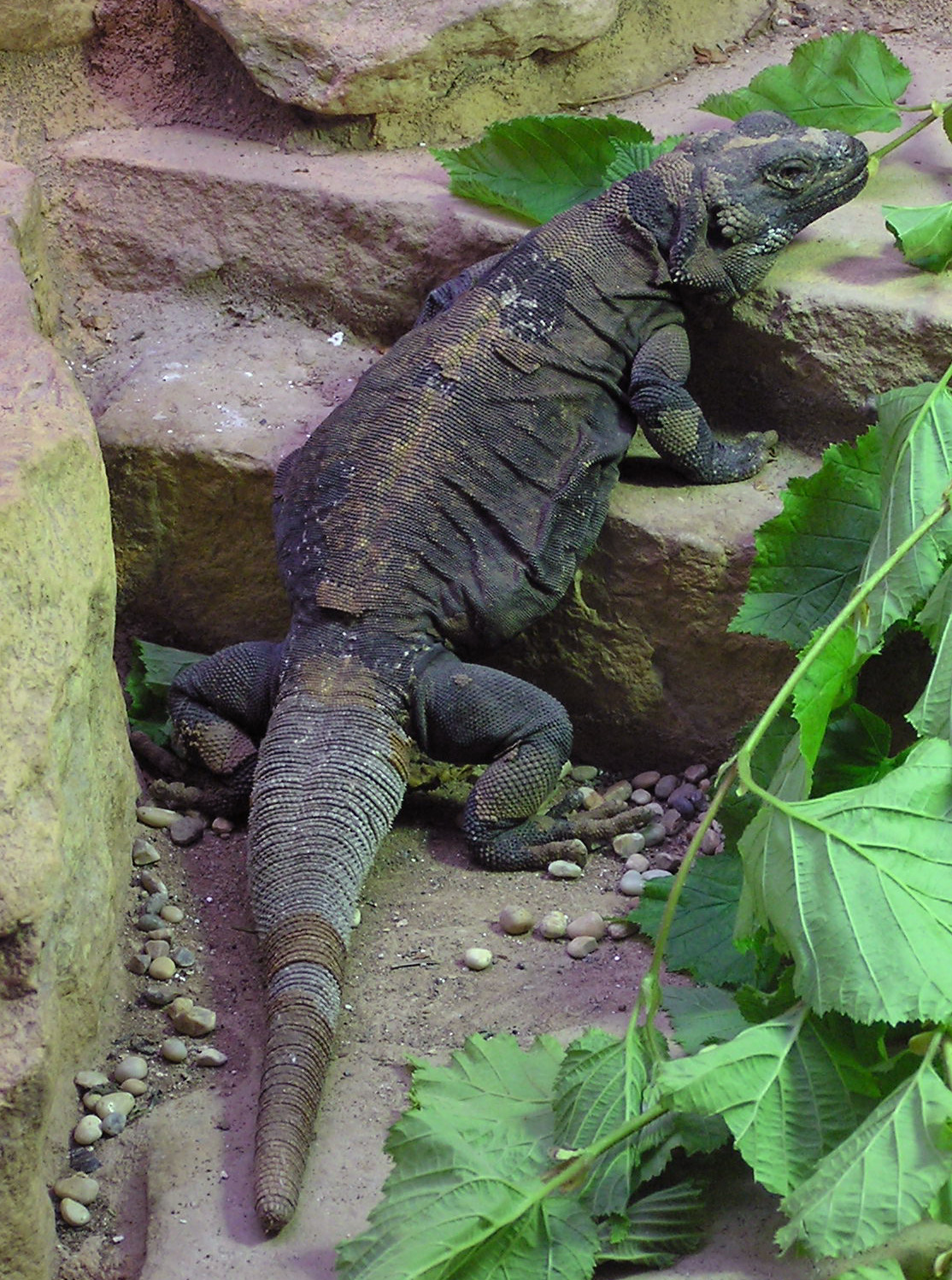
Common chuckwalla, Sauromalus ater

== Range, habitat, and diet ==
The genus Sauromalus has a wide distribution in biomes of the Sonoran and Mojave Deserts. The common chuckwalla (S. ater) is the species with the greatest range, found from southern California east to southern Nevada and Utah and western Arizona, and south to Baja California and northwestern Mexico. The peninsular chuckwalla (S. australis) is found on the eastern portion of the southern half of the Baja California Peninsula.

The other species are island-dwelling, so have much more restricted distributions. The Angel Island chuckwalla (S. hispidus) is found on Isla Ángel de la Guarda and surrounding islands off the coast of the Baja California Peninsula. Two rare and endangered species are the Montserrat chuckwalla (S. slevini) found on Islas Carmen, Coronados, and Montserrat in the southern Gulf of California and the San Esteban chuckwalla or painted chuckwalla (S. varius) found on San Esteban Island, Lobos, and Pelicanos.

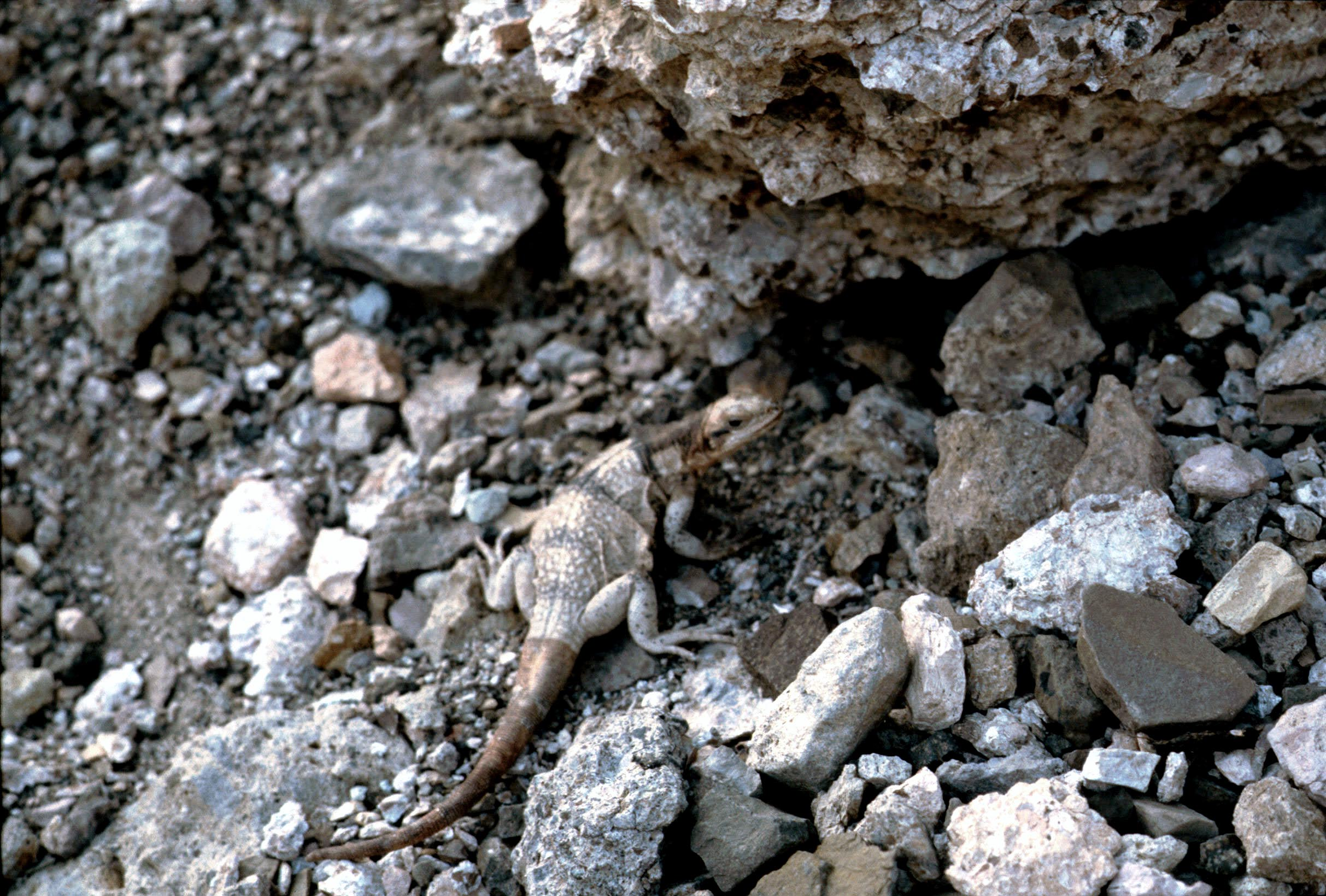
Chuckwalla (S. ater) in rocky area of Death Valley National Park

Chuckwallas prefer lava flows and rocky areas typically vegetated by creosote bush and other such drought-tolerant scrub. The lizards may be found at elevations up to 4,500 ft (1,370 m). Areas of higher plant diversity are often associated with larger individuals.

Primarily herbivorous, chuckwallas feed on leaves, fruit, and flowers of annuals and perennial plants; insects represent a supplementary prey. The lizards are said to prefer yellow flowers, such as those of the brittlebush (Encelia farinosa). Their broad and opportunistic feeding habits along with mild winters in their range allow for individuals to feed throughout most of the year.

== Behavior and reproduction ==
Harmless to humans, these lizards are known to run from potential threats. When disturbed, a chuckwalla wedges itself into a tight rock crevice and inflates its lungs to entrench itself.

Males are seasonally and conditionally territorial; an abundance of resources tends to create a hierarchy based on size, with one large male dominating the area's smaller males. Chuckwallas use a combination of color and physical displays, namely "push-ups", head-bobbing, and gaping of the mouth, to communicate and defend their territory.

Chuckwallas are diurnal animals and as they are ectothermic, spend much of their mornings and winter days basking. They display different basking positions depending on the season. In the spring, they lie inflated on rocks with their stomach pressed to the ground, resting their throat on the rocks. In the summer, this flattened posture is replaced with sitting and stilting. These lizards are well adapted to desert conditions; they are active at temperatures up to 39 °C (102 °F). Chuckwallas hibernate during cooler months and emerge in February. Juveniles emerge first, then adults, as temperatures reach around 32 °C (90 °F).

Mating occurs from April to July, with five to 16 eggs laid between June and August. The eggs hatch in late September. Chuckwallas may live for 25 years or more.

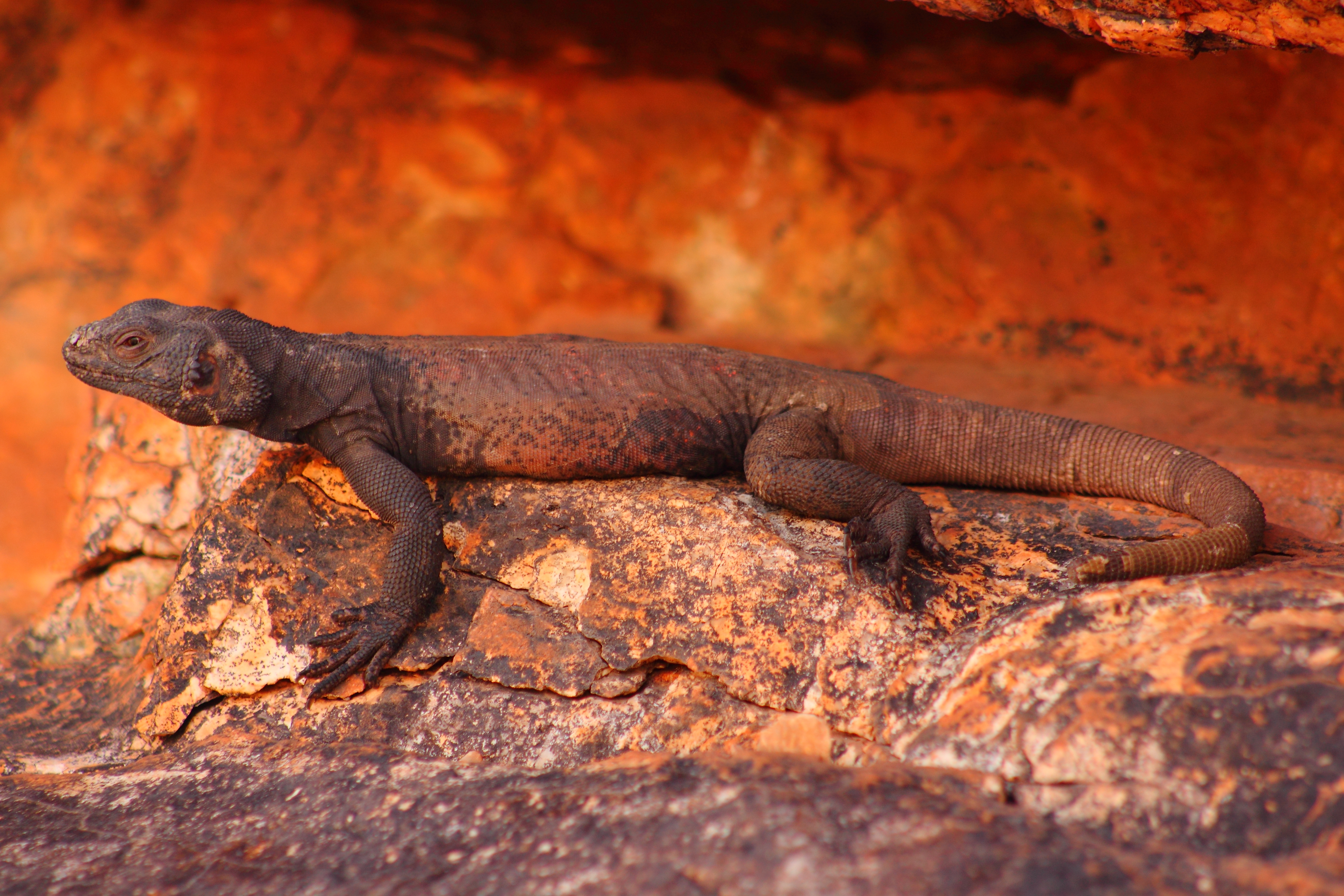
Large male chuckwalla, picture taken in the White Tank Mountains near Surprise, Arizona

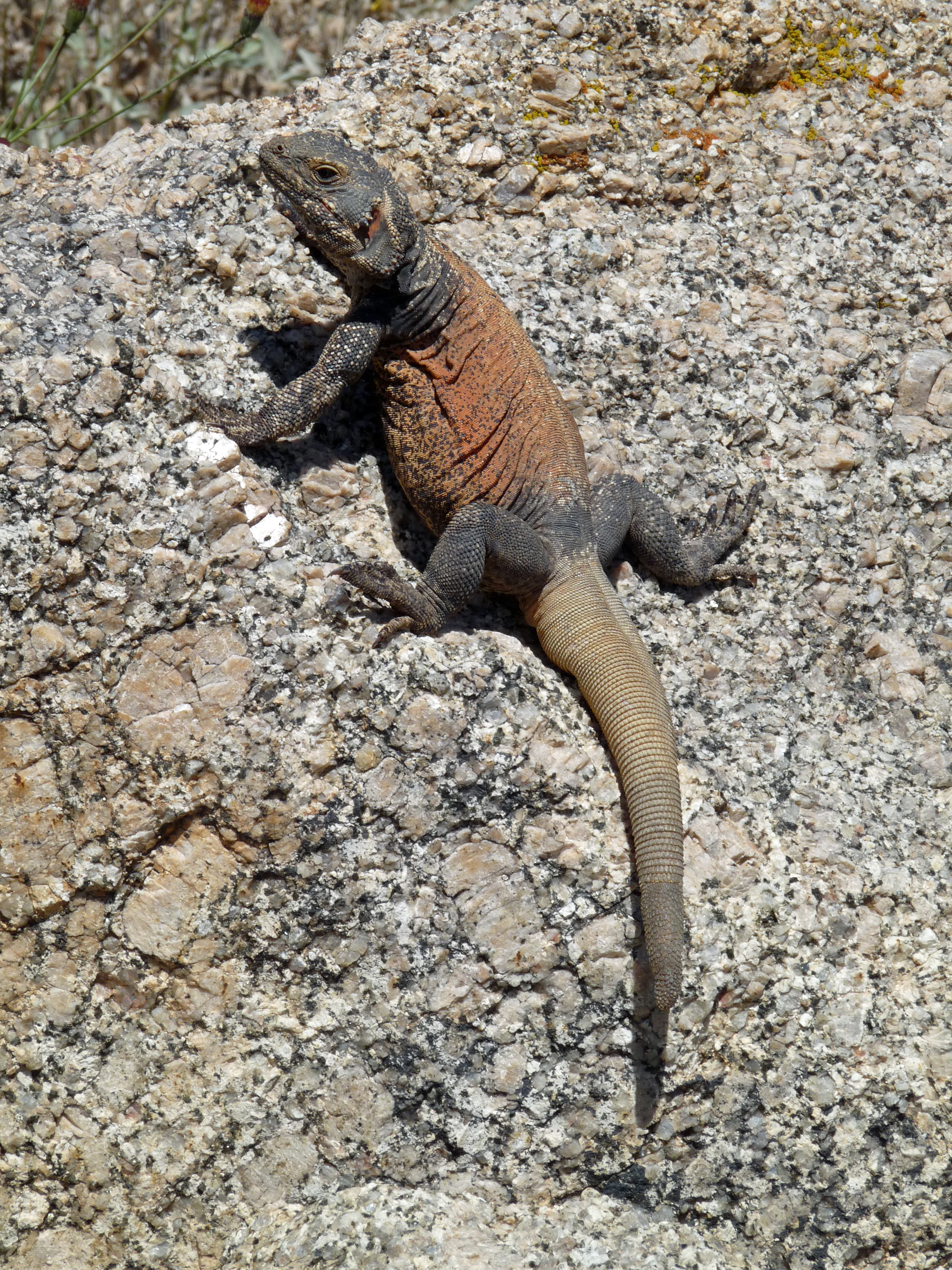
Adult chuckwalla of the Sonoran Desert

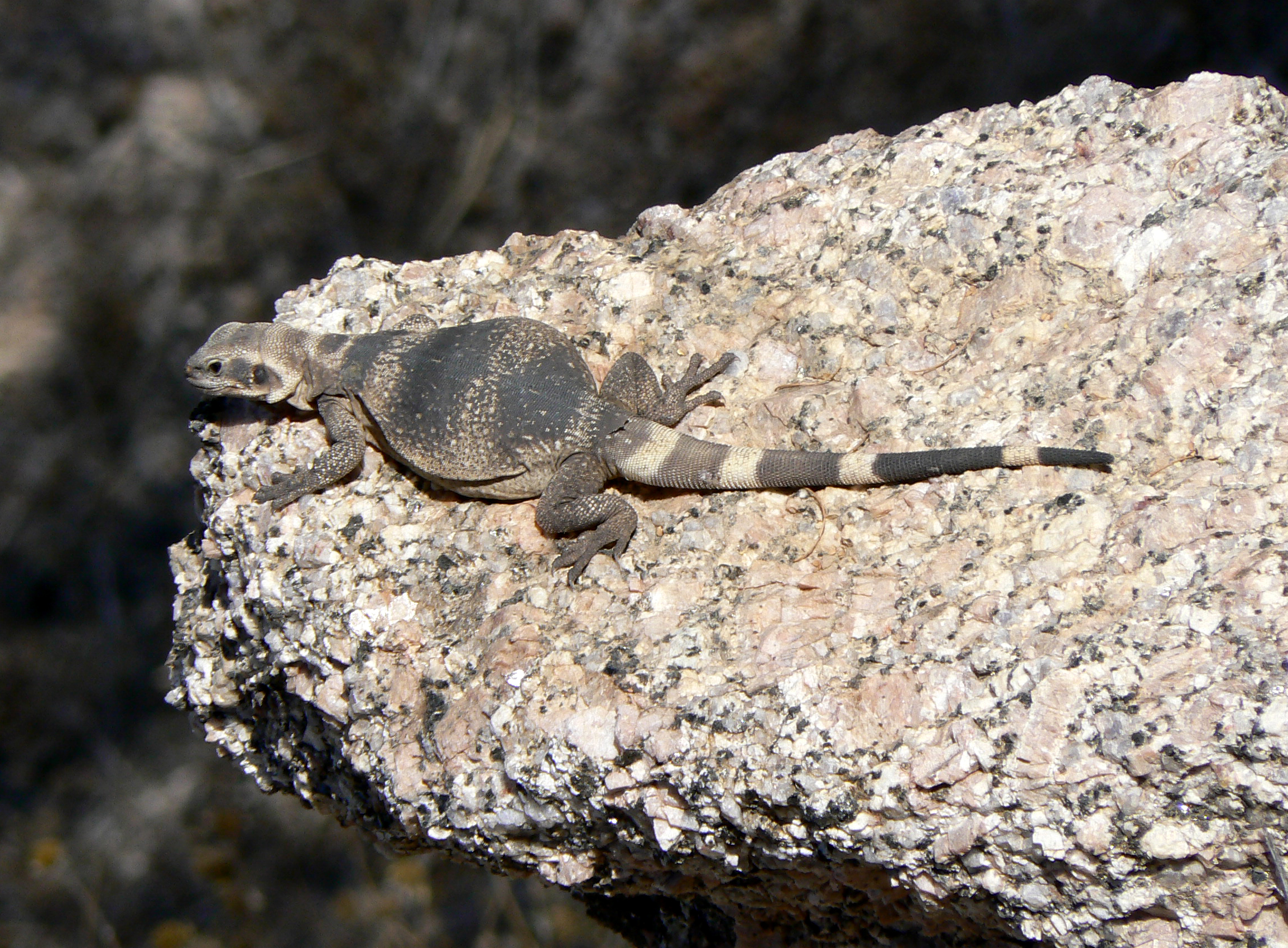
Juvenile chuckwalla of the Sonoran Desert

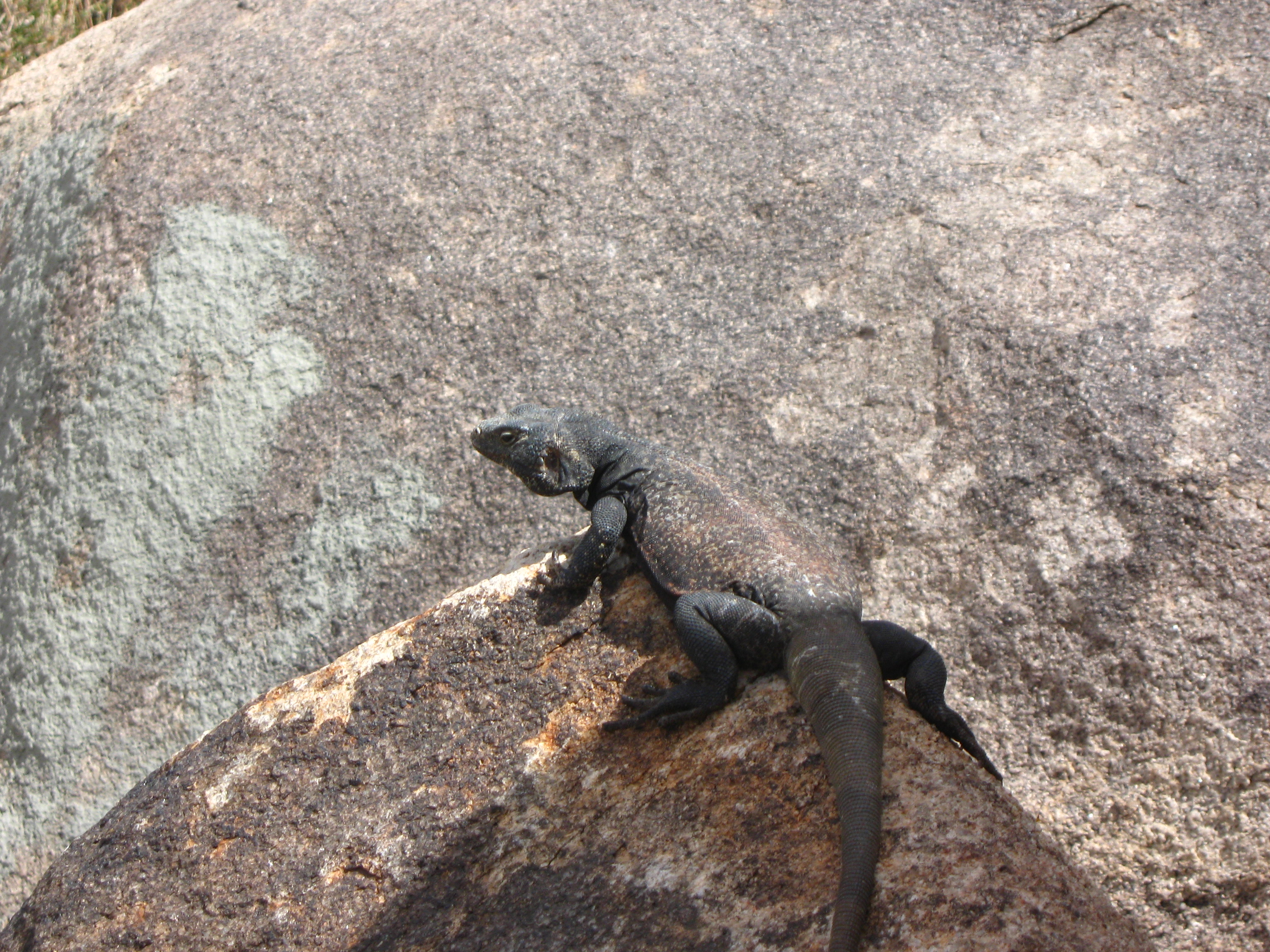
Adult chuckwalla of the Mojave Desert

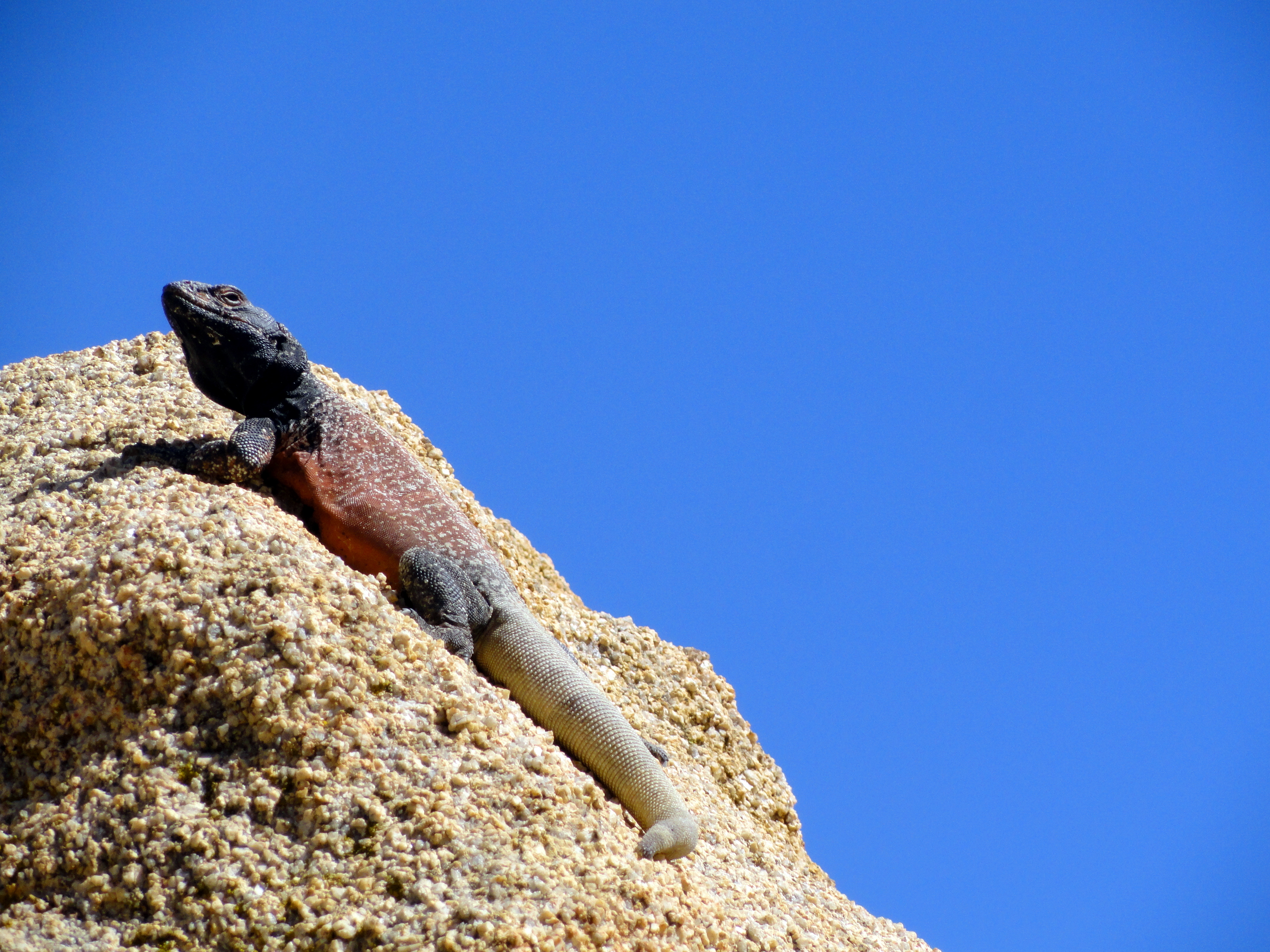
Large male common chuckwalla in Joshua Tree National Park

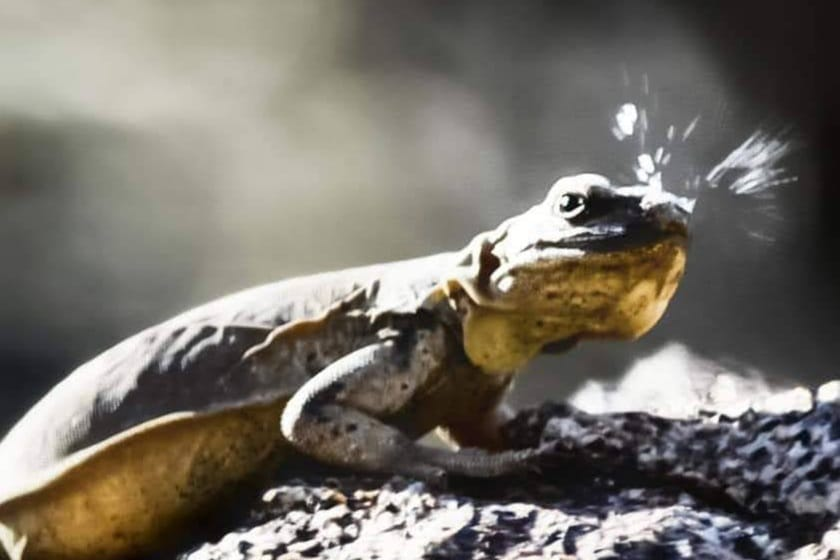
A chuckwalla sneezing salt in Anza-Borrego Desert State Park

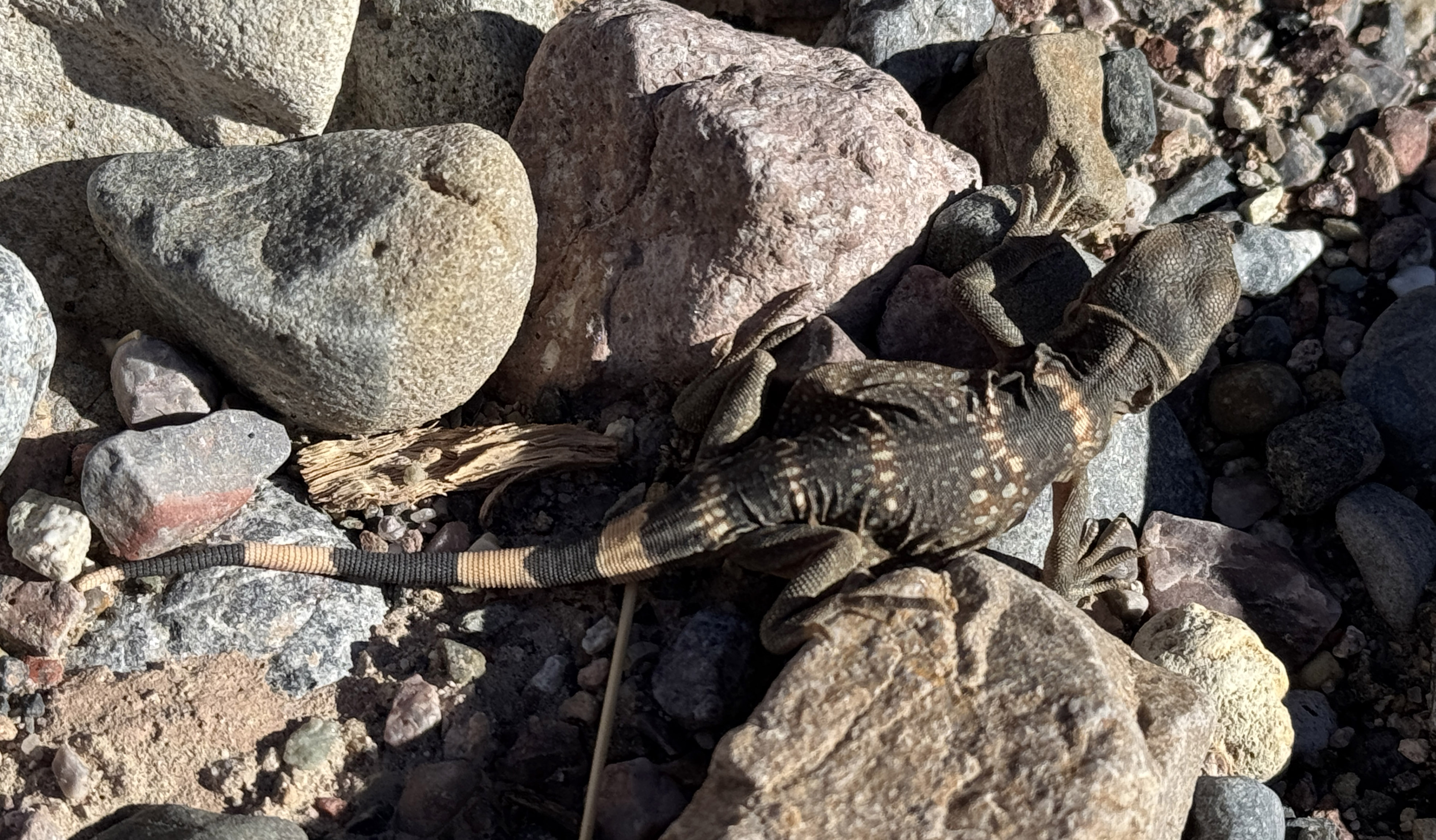
Baby Chuckwalla, Titus Canyon, Death Valley National Park

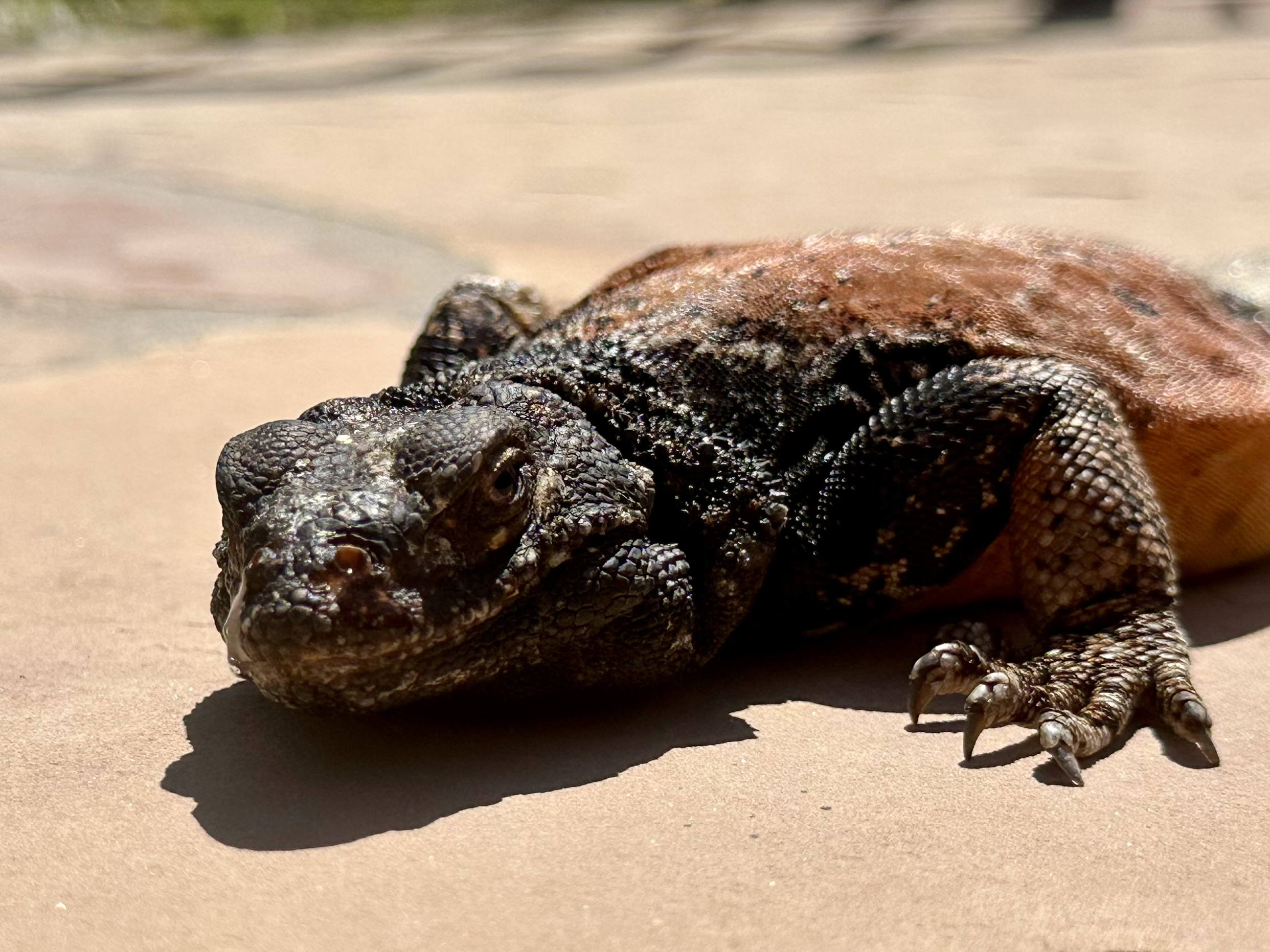
Adult male Sonoran Desert chuckwalla. The photo was taken in May in Paradise Valley, Arizona.

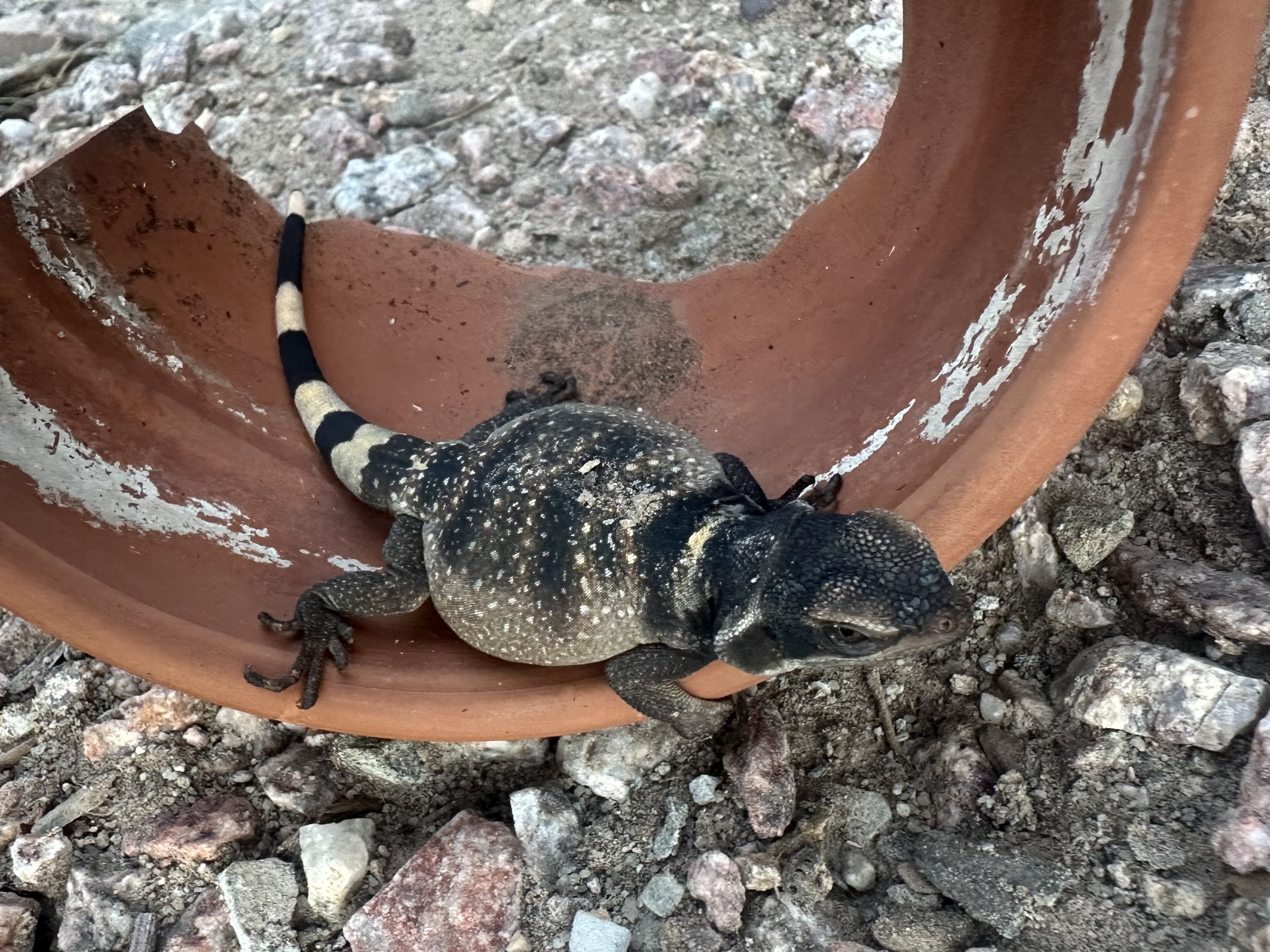
Baby Sonoran Desert chuckwalla. The photo was taken in August in Paradise Valley, Arizona.

== Human use ==
The Seri people considered the Angel Island species of chuckwalla an important food item. They are believed to have translocated the lizards to most of the islands in Bahia de los Angeles for use as a food source in times of need.

The chuckwalla was also a valuable food source to the Timbisha Shoshone people from the Death Valley region. Known to have tender meat, sometimes likened to frog legs, they would also trade it with nearby Tribes that did not have access to the creatures. They were typically hunted with sharp bone and later wire hooks used to puncture the air sacs, allowing the chuckwalla to be removed from the rocks it would wedge itself between.
