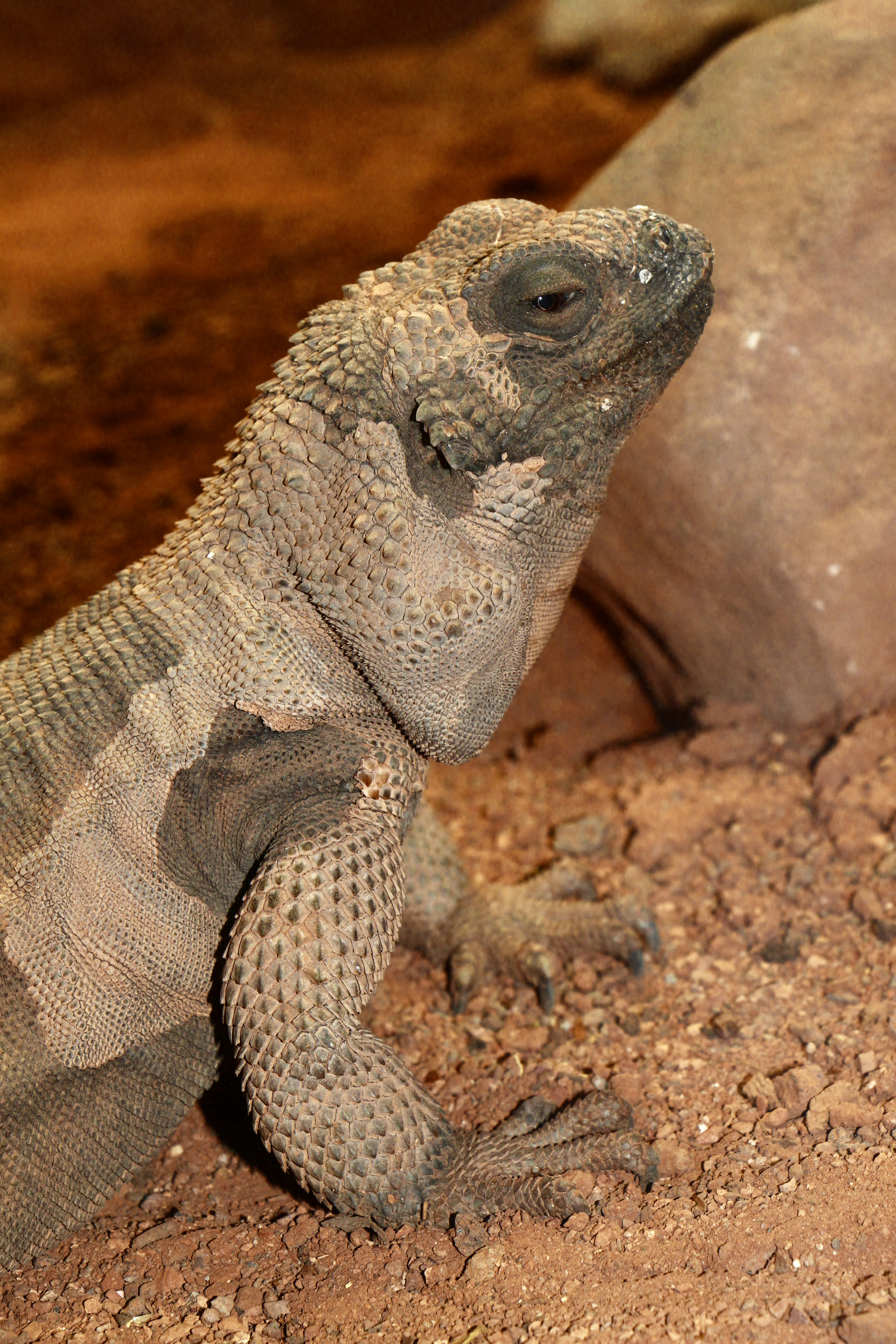

Conservation status
- Endangered (IUCN 3.1)

Scientific classification
- Kingdom: Animalia
- Phylum: Chordata
- Class: Reptilia
- Order: Squamata
- Suborder: Iguania
- Family: Iguanidae
- Genus: Sauromalus
- Species: S. hispidus

Binomial name
- Sauromalus hispidus Stejneger, 1891
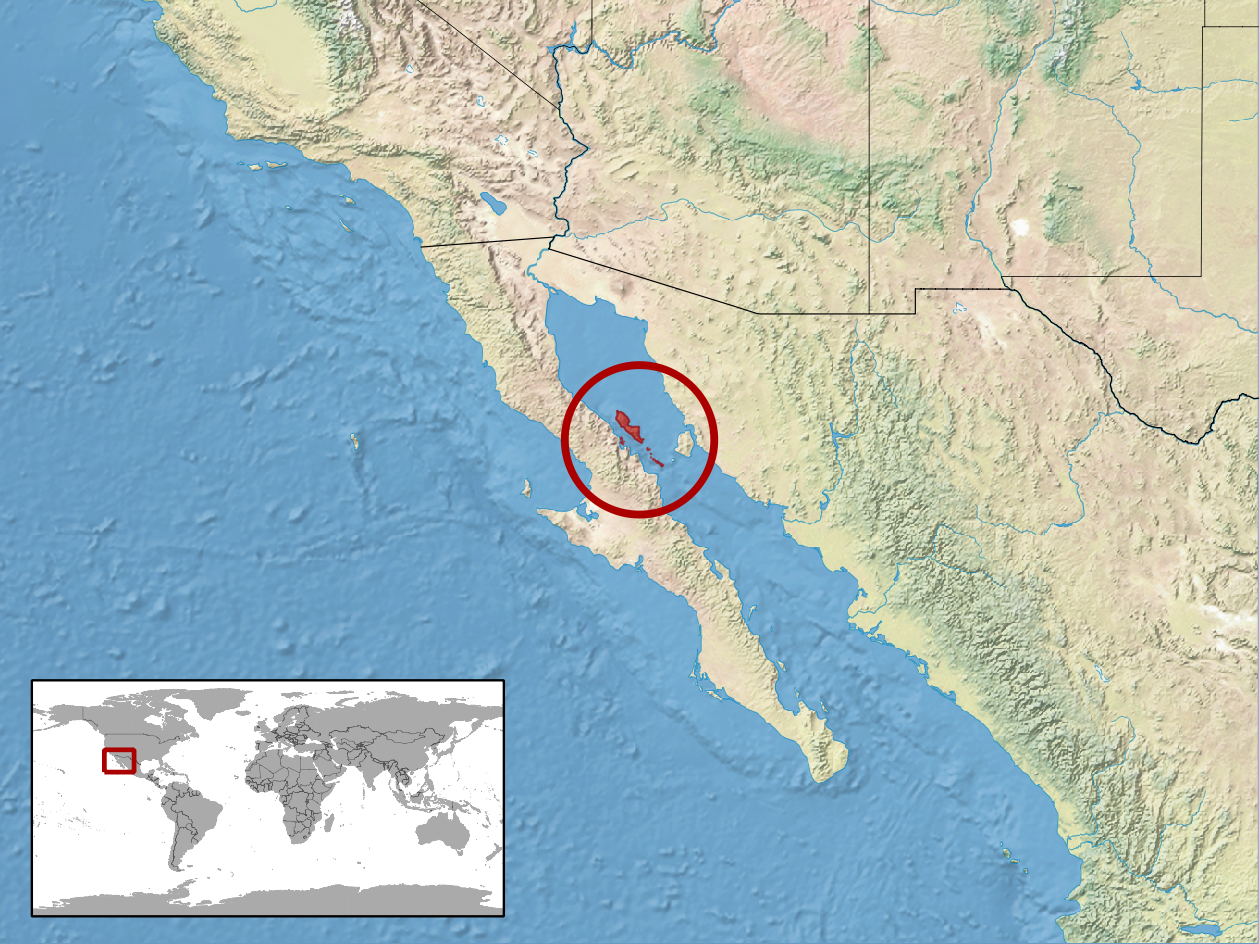

= Angel Island chuckwalla =

Species of lizard

The Angel Island chuckwalla (Sauromalus hispidus), also known as the spiny chuckwalla, is a species of chuckwalla lizard belonging to the family Iguanidae endemic to Isla Ángel de la Guarda (Guardian Angel Island) in the Gulf of California. The species was transported to other islands by a tribe of the Seri as a potential food source.

== Taxonomy and etymology ==
The generic name, Sauromalus, is said to be a combination of two ancient Greek words: sauros meaning "lizard" and omalus meaning "flat". The proper ancient Greek word for "flat" is however homalos (ὁμαλός) or homalēs (ὁμαλής). Its specific name hispidus is Latin for "coarse" or "thorny" in reference to the spines on the chuckwalla's tail.

The common name chuckwalla derives from the Shoshone word tcaxxwal or Cahuilla caxwal, transcribed by Spaniards as chacahuala.

== Description ==
The Angel Island chuckwalla is the second-largest species of chuckwalla, reaching 44 cm (17 in) in body length and 64 cm (25 in) overall length, and weighing up to 1.4 kg (3.1 lb). It is considered a gigantic species as it is two to three times the size of its mainland counterparts. Its body color is a dark brown color with transverse black bands which fade into a solid darker brown to black color as the animal ages.

== Distribution and habitat ==
The Angel Island chuckwalla is endemic to Isla Ángel de la Guarda and 10 smaller islands in the Gulf of California.

== Behavior and reproduction ==
Harmless to humans, these lizards are known to run from potential threats. When disturbed, the chuckwalla inflates its lungs, distends its body, and wedges itself into a tight rock crevice.

Males are seasonally and conditionally territorial; an abundance of resources tends to create a hierarchy based on size, with one large male dominating the area's smaller males. Chuckwallas defend their territory and communicate with one another using a combination of color and physical displays, namely "push ups", head-hobbing, and gaping of the mouth.

Angel Island chuckwallas are diurnal animals, and as they are exothermic, spend much of their mornings and winter days basking. These lizards are well adapted to desert conditions; they are active at temperatures up to 102 °F (39 °C).

Mating occurs from April to July, with five to 16 eggs laid between June and August. The eggs hatch in late September. Chuckwallas may live for 25 years or more.

== Diet ==
Chuckwallas prefer dwelling in lava flows and rocky areas with nooks and crannies available for a retreat when threatened. These areas are typically vegetated by creosote bush and cholla cacti which form the staple of their diet as the chuckwalla is primarily herbivorous. Chuckwallas also feed on leaves, fruit, and flowers of annuals and perennial plants; insects represent a supplementary prey if eaten at all.

== Human contact ==
The Comca'ac considered this species of chuckwalla an important food item. So much so, a few lizards were cross-bred with San Esteban chuckwallas and translocated to most of the islands in Bahia de los Angeles: Isla San Lorenzo Norte, Isla San Lorenzo Sur, and Tiburón Island by the Seri people for use as a food source in times of need. This was before the founding of America and most of these populations appear to have died out, but the process was repeated by herpeticulturalists in the early 2000s as a way of legally producing a San Esteban-like chuckwalla that the average reptile enthusiast could keep. The crosses are fertile and seem to have the best traits of both species – the brighter coloration of the San Esteban chuckwalla with the calmer temperament of the Angel Island chuckwalla.
