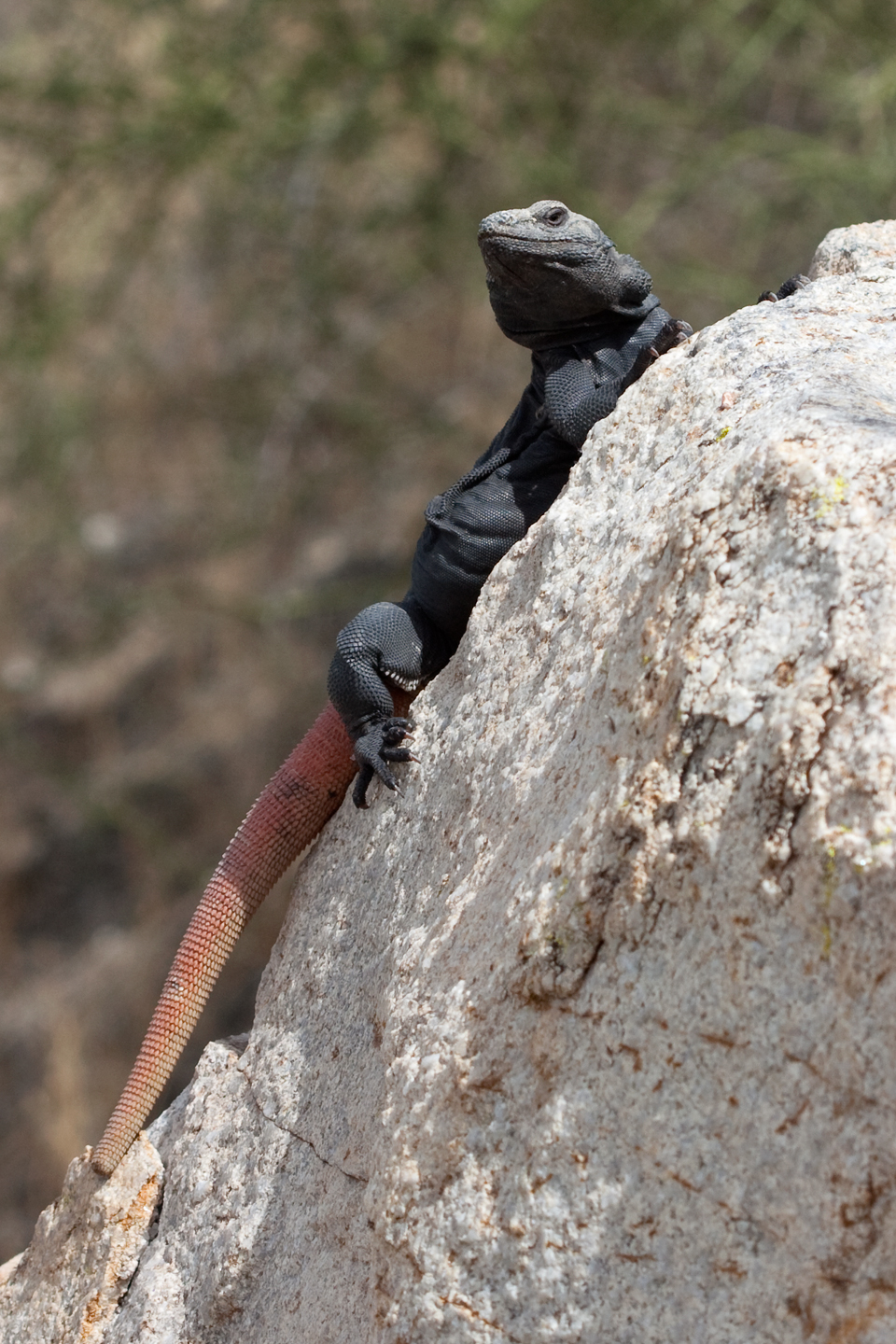

Conservation status
- Least Concern (IUCN 3.1)

- Secure (NatureServe)

Scientific classification
- Kingdom: Animalia
- Phylum: Chordata
- Class: Reptilia
- Order: Squamata
- Suborder: Iguania
- Family: Iguanidae
- Genus: Sauromalus
- Species: S. ater

Binomial name
- Sauromalus ater Dumeril, 1856
- Approximate range of S. ater

Synonyms
- Sauromalus obesus (Baird, 1859)

= Sauromalus ater =

Common chuckwalla

Large lizard native to the Sonoran and Mojave Deserts

Sauromalus ater, also known as the common chuckwalla or northern chuckwalla, is a species of lizard in the family Iguanidae. It inhabits the Sonoran and Mojave Deserts of the Southwestern United States and northwestern Mexico. Its range extends from eastern California, Utah, and Nevada south to Baja California and Sonora.

== Taxonomy ==
The common name "chuckwalla" (or chuckawalla) is derived from the Shoshone word tcaxxwal, or caxwal, the form used by the Cahuilla of southeastern California.

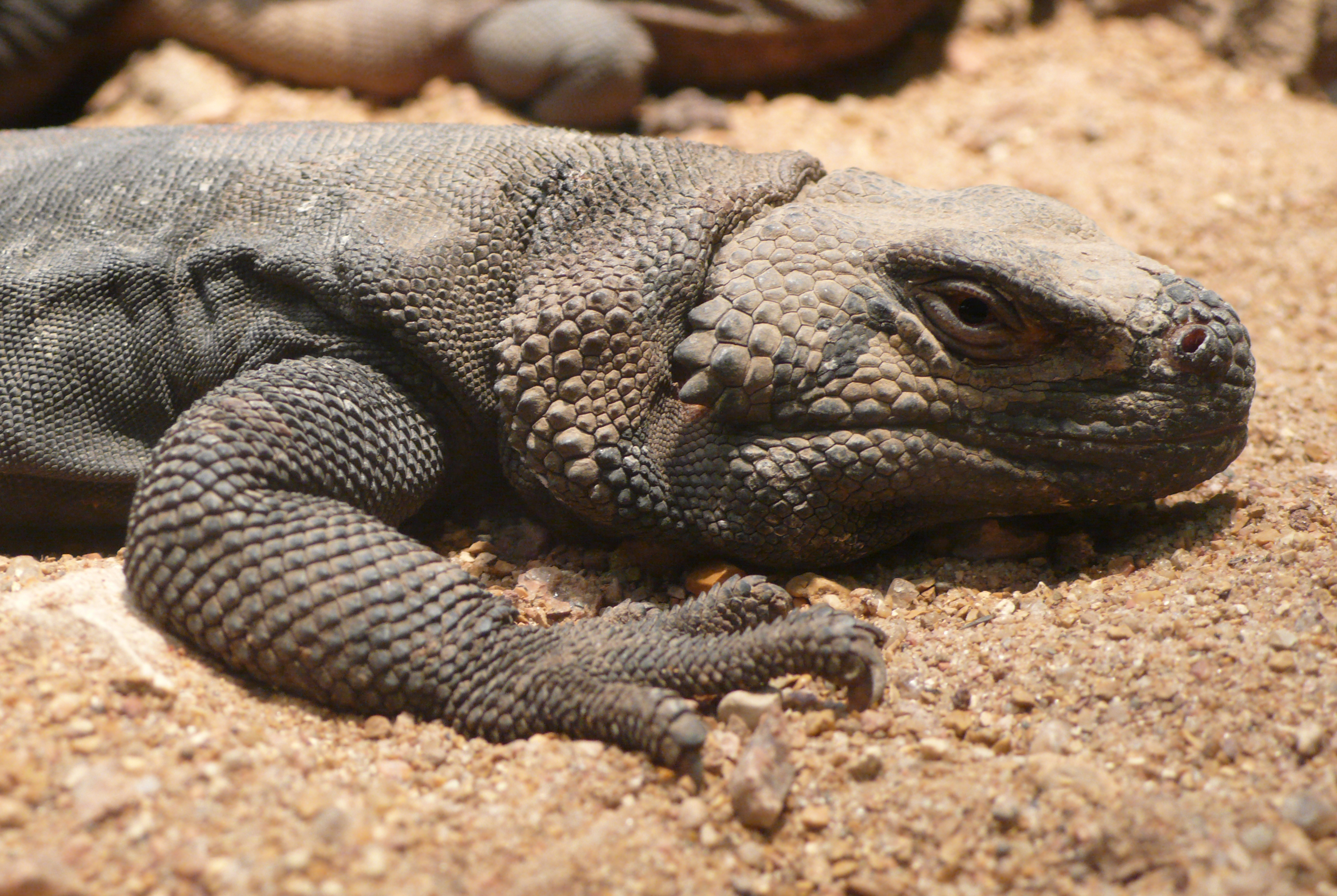
Closeup

Its generic name, Sauromalus, is said to be a combination of two ancient Greek words: sauros meaning "lizard" and omalus meaning "flat". The proper ancient Greek word for "flat" is however homalos (ὁμαλός) or homalēs (ὁμαλής). Its specific name is ater, Latin for "black" or "dark"

The United States populations of the species were previously known as Sauromalus obesus; although that name is no longer officially recognized, it is still very common in the literature and it remains in many standard natural history references for North America. In 1998, Bradford D. Hollingsworth examined variations in Sauromalus and concluded that only five species should be recognized. He regarded S. obesus as conspecific with S. ater, and he used S. ater, which has priority, as the specific name of the combined taxon. Based primarily on the extensive use of the name S. obesus, a petition to give that name precedence over that of S. ater was submitted to the ICZN. However, this reasoning was dubious and the priority of S. ater was maintained. In 2004, ICZN ruled that the name Sauromalus ater was first described by zoologist Auguste Duméril in 1856, thus had precedence over the name Sauromalus obesus which was not named until 1858 by Baird.

== Subspecies ==
Five subspecies are recognized:

- Sauromalus ater ater Duméril, 1856
- Sauromalus ater shawi Cliff, 1958
- Sauromalus ater multiforaminatus (Tanner & Avery, 1964)
- Sauromalus ater townsendi Dickerson, 1919
- Sauromalus ater tumidus Shaw, 1945

== Description ==
The common chuckwalla is a large, flat-bodied lizard with a large, rounded belly, and a wide-based, blunt-tipped tail. Reaching a total length of 20 in (51 cm) and a weight of 0.9 kg (2.0 lb). Small scales cover its body, with larger scales protecting the ear openings. The coloration of these lizards varies by location and between juveniles and adults, as well as between males and females. In adult males, the head, shoulder, and pelvic regions are black, while the midbody is light tan speckled with brown. Adult females are brownish in color with a scattering of dark red spots. Young chuckwallas have four or five broad bands across their bodies, and three or four on the tail which are lost in adulthood by males, but retained somewhat by females.

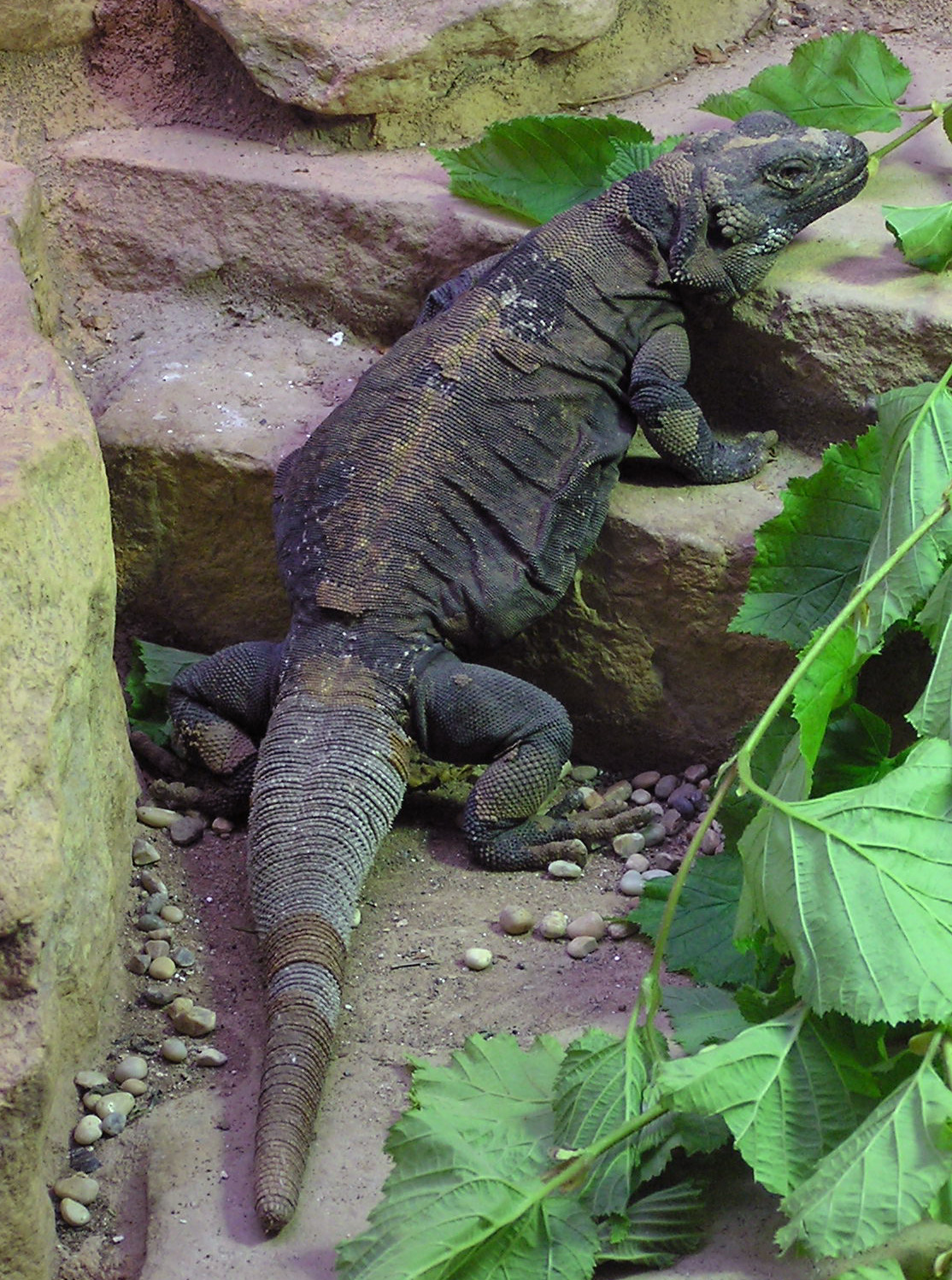
Common chuckwalla Sauromalus ater at Bristol Zoo, England

== Behavior ==
Harmless to humans, these lizards are known to run from potential threats. When disturbed, the chuckwalla enters crevices between rocks and inflates its lungs using a gular pump. Lung inflation distends its body and wedges the lizard tightly in place.

Males are seasonally and conditionally territorial; an abundance of resources tends to create a hierarchy based on size, with one large male dominating the area's smaller males. Chuckwallas use a combination of color and physical displays, namely "push ups", head-bobbing, and gaping of the mouth to communicate and defend their territory.

They spend much of their morning basking. They display different basking positions depending on the season. In the spring, they lie inflated on rocks with their stomach pressed to the ground, resting their throat on the rocks. In the summer, this flattened posture is replaced with sitting and stilting.

Chuckwallas are diurnal animals, and as they are ectothermic, spend much of their mornings and cooler days basking. These lizards are well adapted to desert conditions; they are active at temperatures up to 102 °F (39 °C). Chuckwallas brumate during cooler months and emerge in February.

Mating occurs from April to July, with 5 to 16 eggs laid between June and August. The eggs hatch in late September.

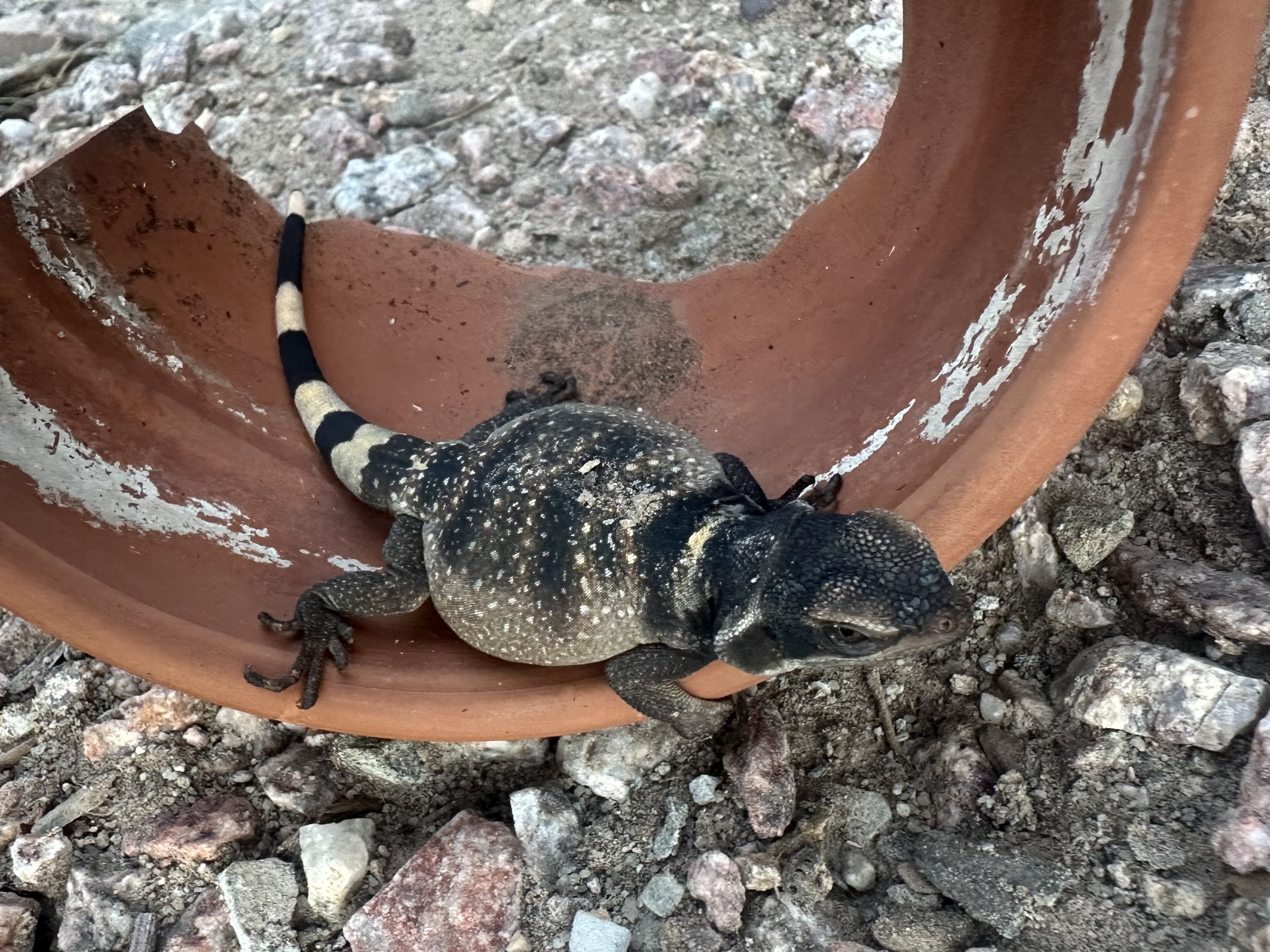
Baby in August in Paradise Valley, Arizona

== Diet ==
Primarily herbivorous, the chuckwalla eats creosote bush flowers, leaves, fruit, and occasionally insects. They prefer to eat annuals forbs and grasses but will also eat leaves of perennial shrubs when needed.Areas of higher plant diversity are often associated with larger individuals.

== Human Use ==
Chuckwallas were once a source of food for Death Valley Native Americans. They would hunt chuckwallas hidden in rock crevices by thrusting a bone-barbed hook into the crevice to puncture its lungs and deflate it.

== Gallery ==
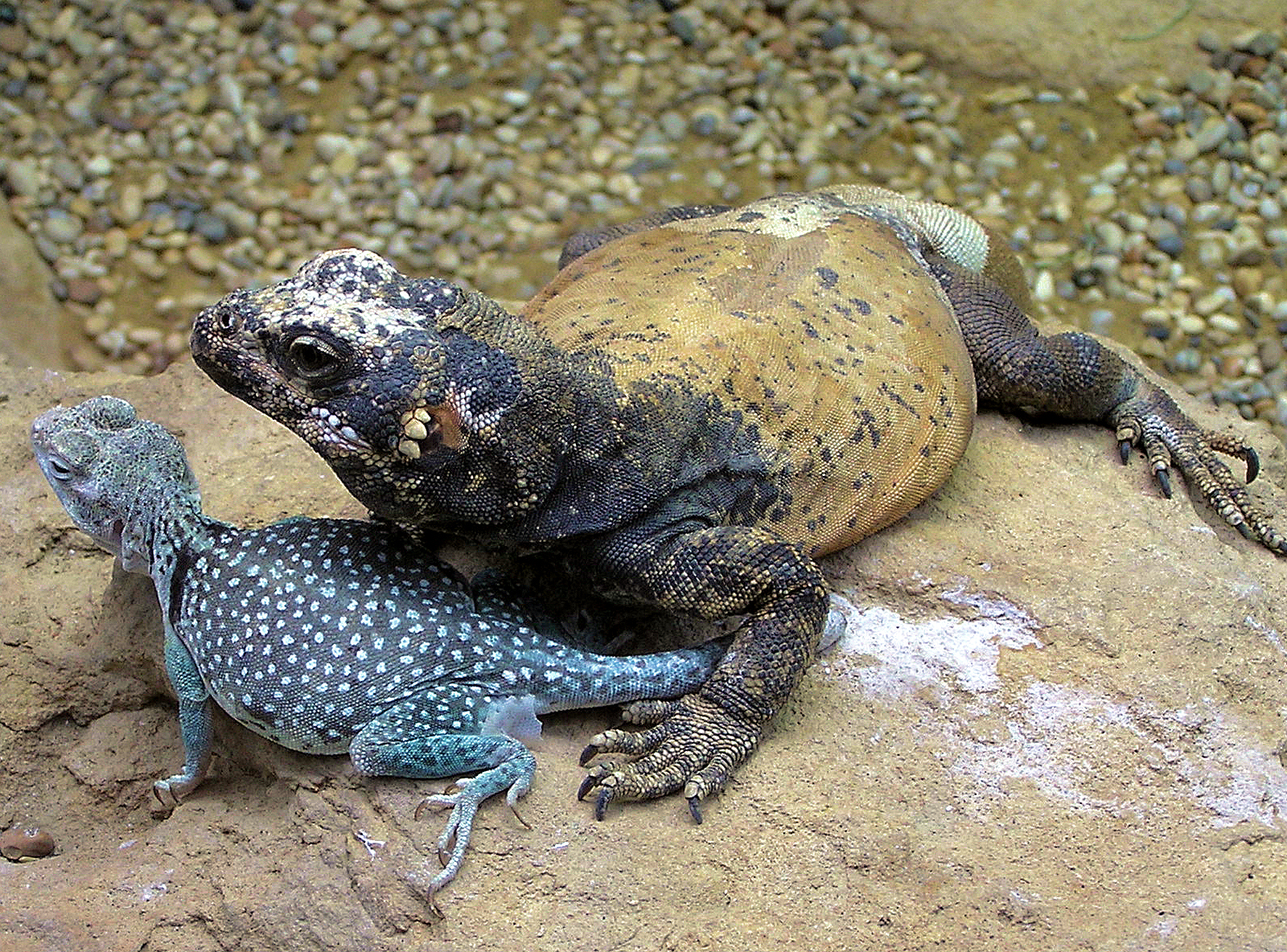
With a common collared lizard (Crotaphytus collaris) at the Bristol Zoo

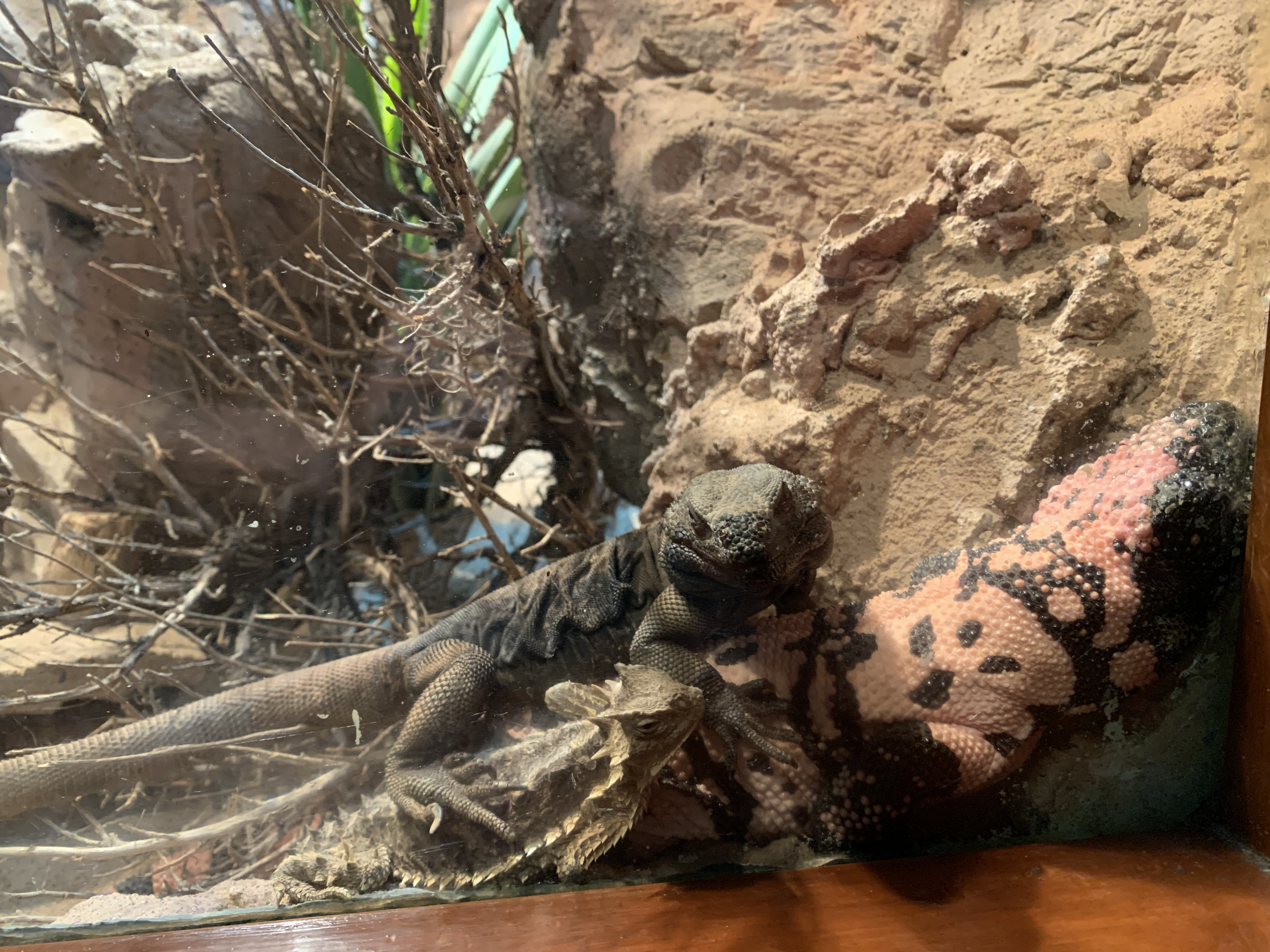
With a giant horned lizard and a gila monster, at the Bronx Zoo

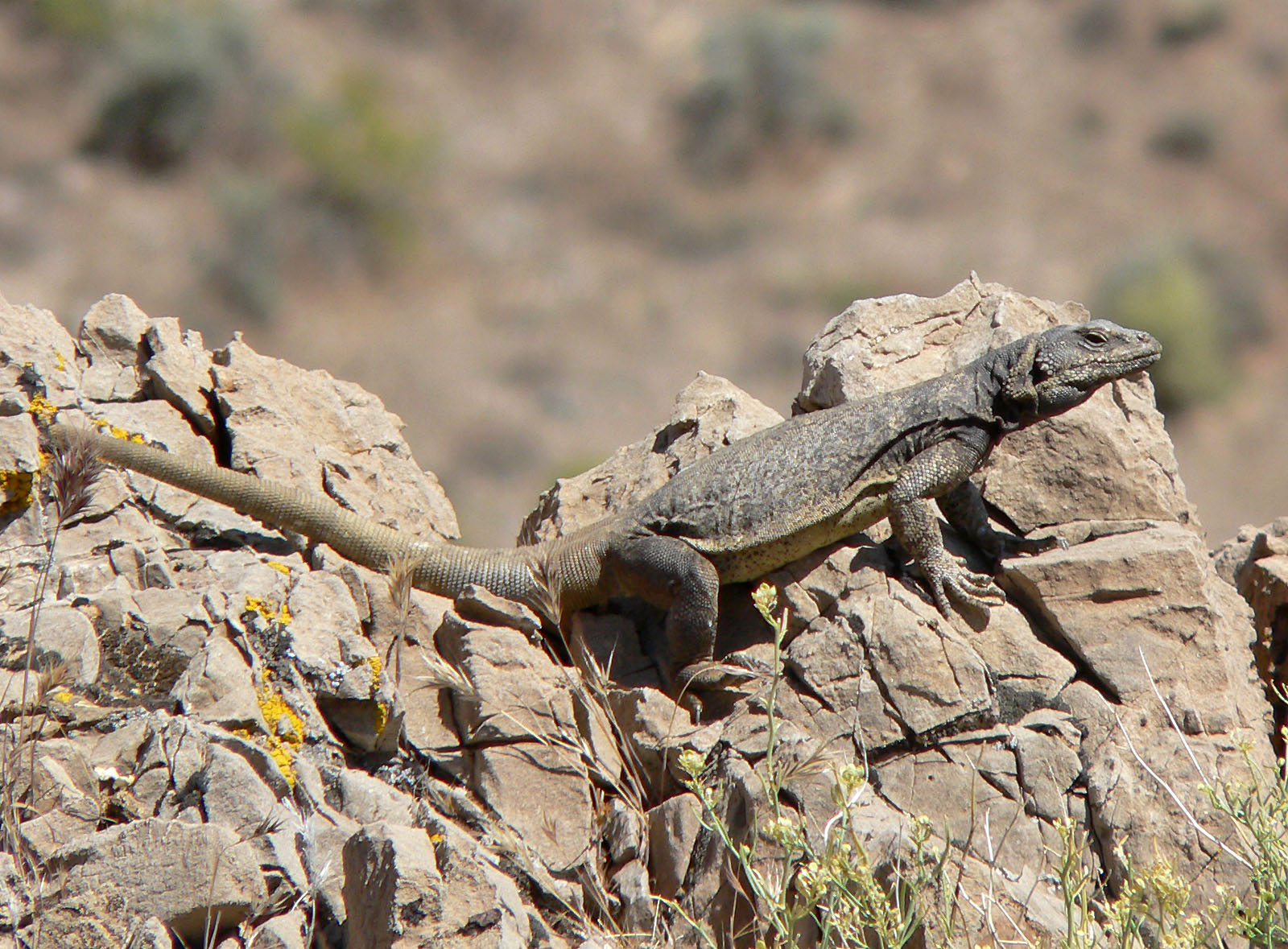

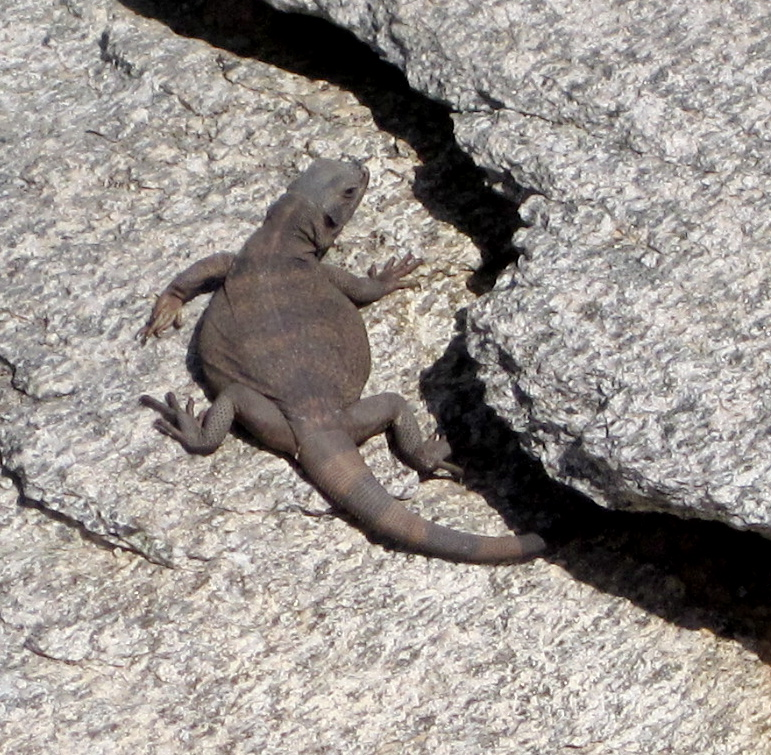

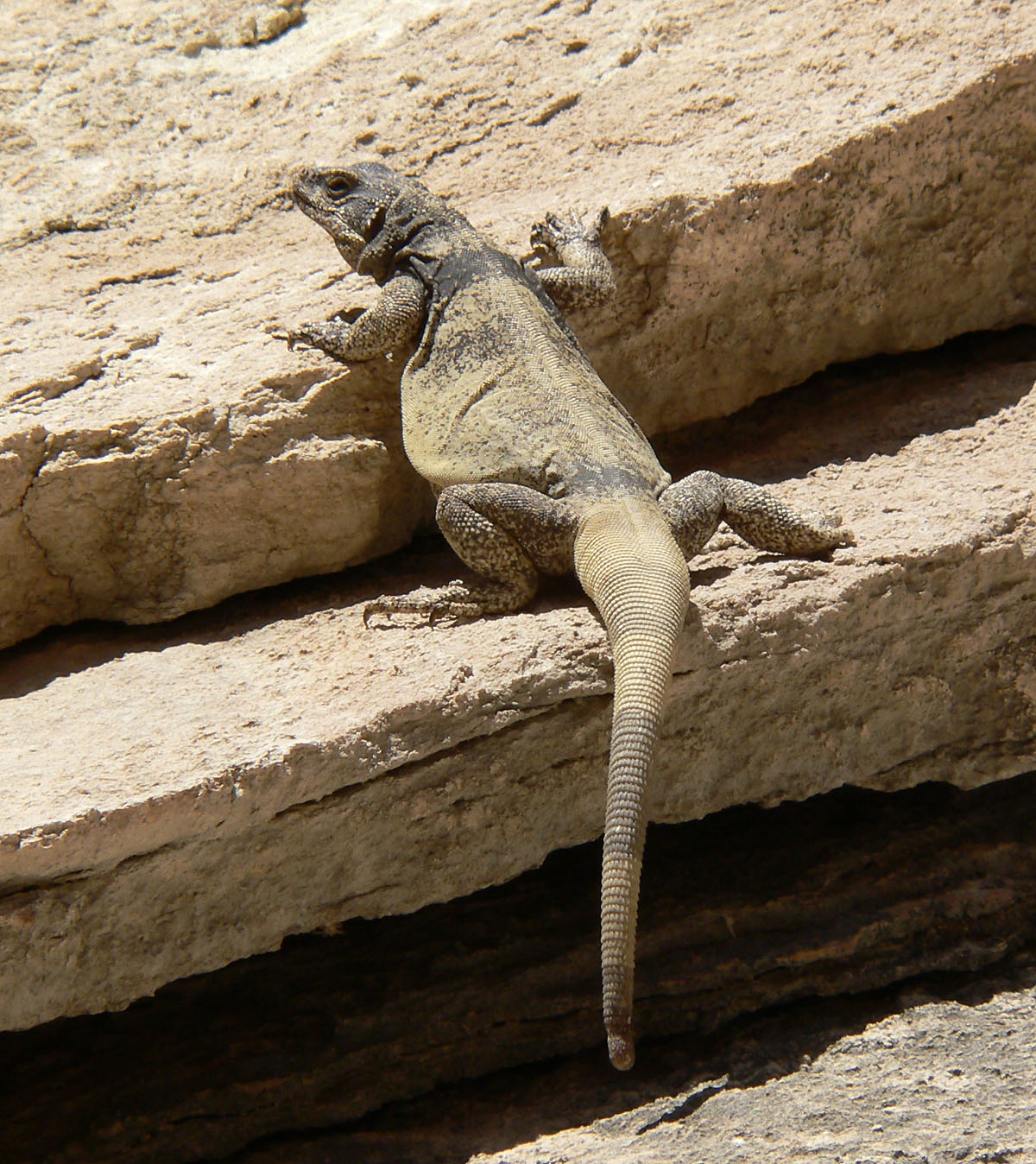

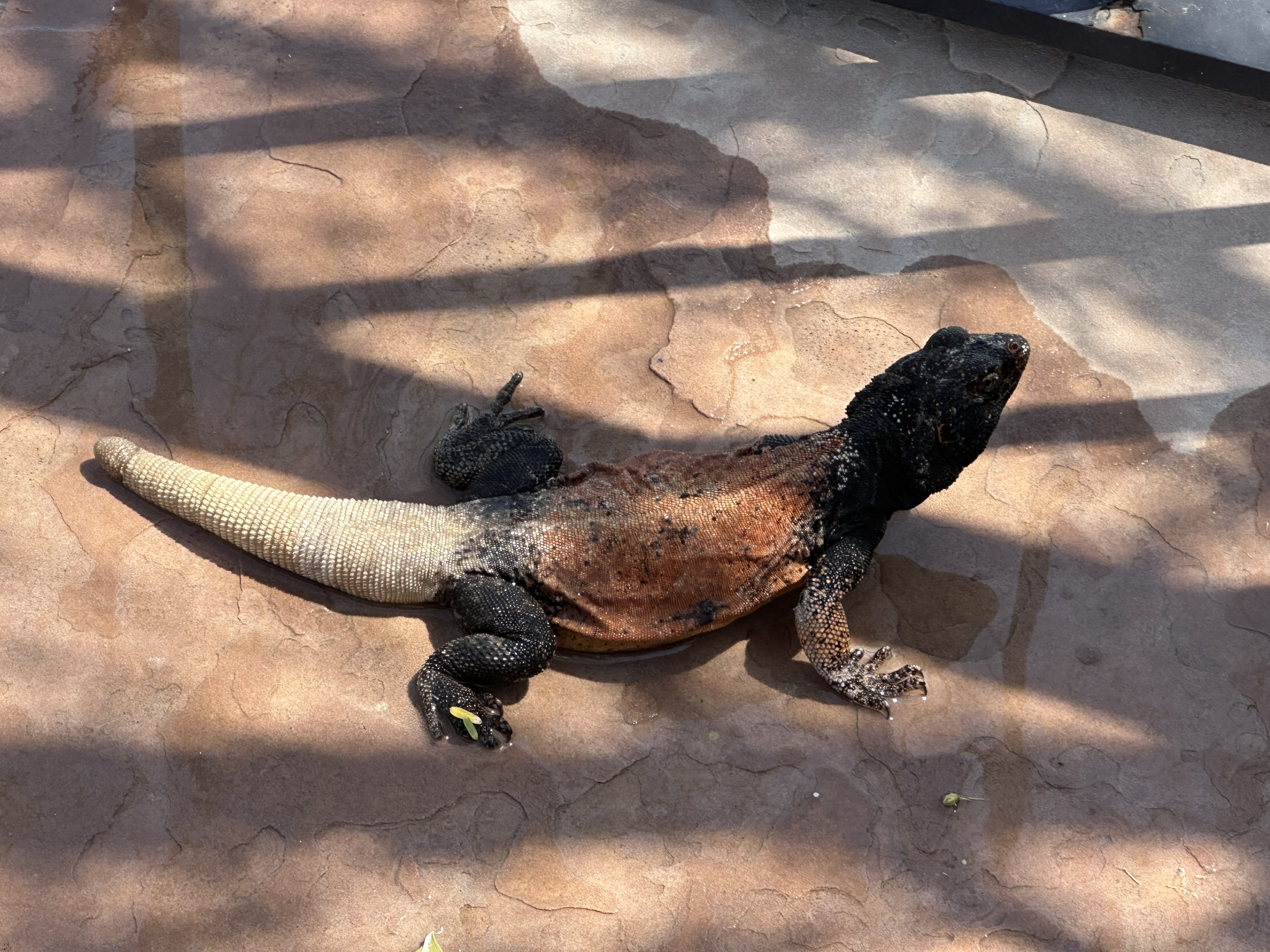
Adult male Sonoran Desert chuckwalla. The photo was taken in May in Paradise Valley, Arizona.
