= Herpetoculture =

Feeding and care of reptiles

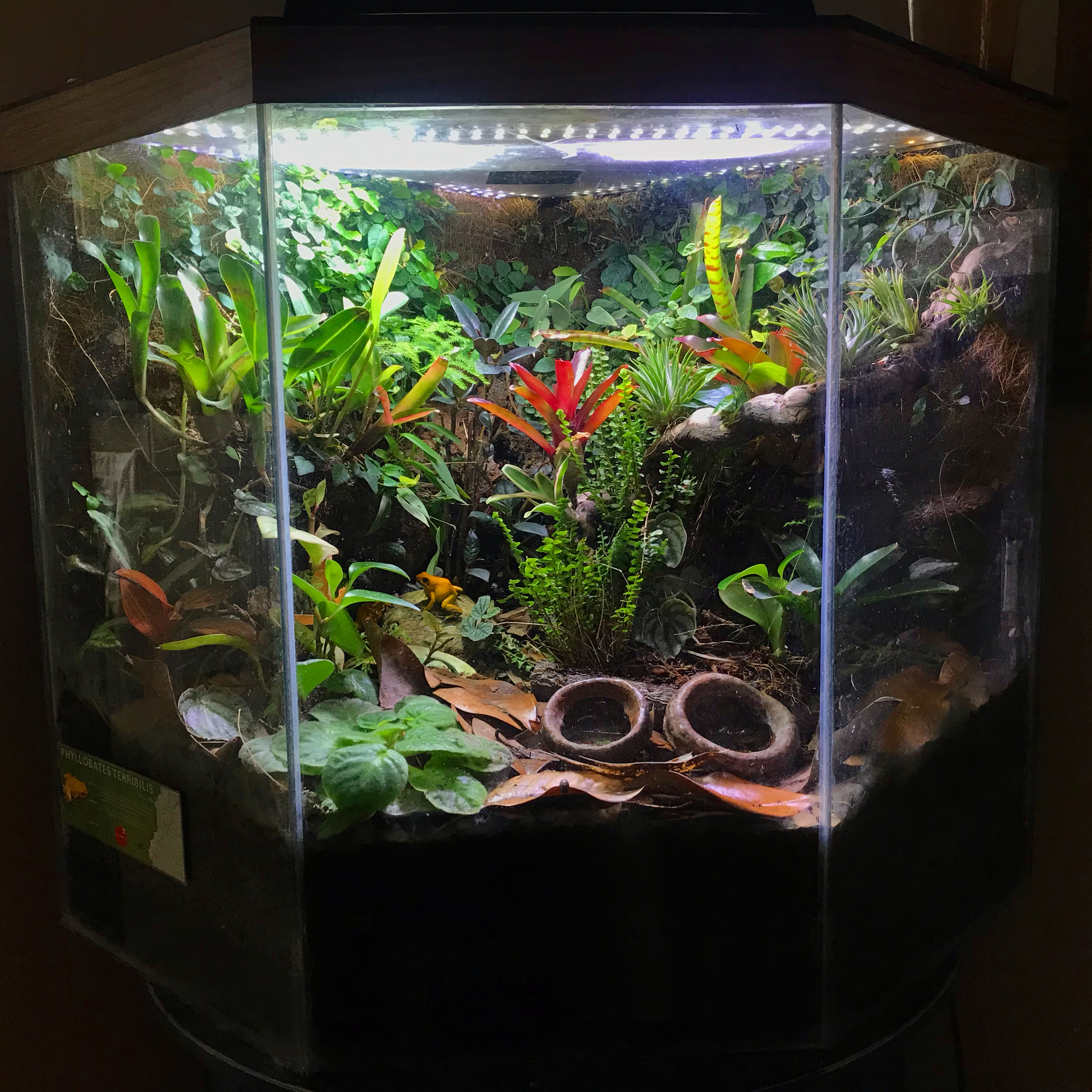
A vivarium housing poison dart frogs

Herpetoculture is the keeping of live reptiles and amphibians in captivity, whether as a hobby or as a commercial breeding operation. "Herps" is an informal term for both reptiles and amphibians, shortened from the scientific umbrella term "herptiles". It is undertaken by people of all ages and from all walks of life, including career herpetologists, professional reptile or amphibian breeders, and casual hobbyists.

== Etymology ==
The origin of the word "herpetoculture" is credited to Tom Huff, who devised the word to distinguish what he, as a self-described "herpetoculturist", was doing—working to keeping reptiles and amphibians alive and healthy—from what herpetologists of that era were generally doing, namely, collecting specimens for preservation in museum collections. The word itself comes from the Greek language origin herpein, which means "to creep".

== Equipment ==
=== Enclosures ===
Though traditional glass aquariums and terrariums are still widely used, in recent years glass and fiberglass cages designed specifically for herps have become more widely available. Many herpetoculturists prefer these newer enclosures as they come in larger sizes, are more secure, can be stacked, and are more easily modified to included heat and humidity sources. At one time it was commonly accepted to keep multiple creatures in a small enclosure; however, current cage size recommendations discourage this. These size recommendations differ depending on the species and its natural environment.

=== Vivaria ===
As reptiles are cold blooded they generally need to be kept in climate-controlled enclosures, especially when kept in regions further away from the equator. A standard enclosure usually incorporates a thermostat and a heat emitter; usually a heating pad, heat tape or an incandescent light bulb. Hot rocks can be used, but as a secondary heat source, as they often provide uneven heating. Some reptiles also require some form of Ultraviolet radiation which can be provided through a UV bulb. The lighting can be set to a timer to simulate a day/night cycle. Heat emitters are usually placed at one end of the enclosure to allow for a temperature gradient, so a reptile may move to the other end of the enclosure if it needs to cool itself.

=== Incubators ===
Many reptiles are oviparous and will lay eggs if successfully mated. Breeders may use incubators to increase their chances of successful hatching. Reptilian incubators generally consist of a thermostat and hygrometer, plus various heating and misting devices, as to create a stable environment. Unlike most avian eggs, reptile eggs do not need to be turned; in the wild they are generally laid in mounds or underground and left to incubate.

== Husbandry ==
=== Feeding ===
Reptiles and amphibians can be omnivores, carnivores, or herbivores. Omnivorous reptiles can be fed species-dependent mixes of plant or meat-based foods, with additional supplementation, most commonly calcium. Carnivorous reptiles may need living or dried insects or whole rodents. Frozen rodents can be bought from pet shops and are then thawed before feeding, and live rodents can be kept and sustained before feeding. Some species of reptiles will also feed on smaller reptiles.

=== Breeding ===
Many species of reptiles have a seasonal breeding cycle. For example, in southern Australia, the Eastern Long Neck turtle brumates over winter before mating in spring. Herpetoculturists who wish to breed their reptiles may have to alter the environment in the vivarium to simulate seasons to encourage successful mating. Amphibians are easily bred in captivity. Due to their small size and low-maintenance requirements, large captive populations can be substantiated easily and for a low-cost compared to other organisms.

== Controversy ==
While commonly kept species of reptiles and amphibians are typically captive bred rather than field-collected, capture of wild animals for the exotic pet trade can have an adverse impact on wild populations. Additionally, exotic species may escape from or be released by irresponsible pet owners and become invasive species. Captive born reptiles are often born with no parasites in them while wild caught reptiles often come with parasites with them and would need an experienced exotic vet to treat parasites before putting them into an enclosure. Also, with wild caught animals you may have other difficulties when it comes to feeding them, they are used to eating live food and food that they are native to not provided foods that are common in the hobby.

== See also ==
- Wildlife trade
