= Isla San Lorenzo Sur =

Island in Mexico

- Location within Mexico

Geography
- Location: Gulf of California
- Coordinates: 28°37′56.10″N 112°48′57.10″W
- Highest elevation: 460 m (1510 ft)

Administration
- Mexico
- State: Baja California

Demographics
- Population: uninhabited

Isla San Lorenzo Sur, is an island in the Gulf of California east of the Baja California Peninsula. The island is uninhabited and is part of the Mexicali Municipality. Isla San Lorenzo Norte is located immediately northwest of Isla San Lorenzo Sur.

== Biology ==
Isla San Lorenzo Sur has seven species of reptiles: Aspidoscelis cana (Isla Salsipuedes whiptail), Crotalus lorenzoensis (San Lorenzo Island diamond rattlesnake), Hypsiglena ochrorhyncha (coast night snake), Lampropeltis californiae (California kingsnake), Phyllodactylus nocticolus (peninsular leaf-toed gecko), Sauromalus hispidus (spiny chuckwalla), and Uta antiqua (San Lorenzo Islands side-blotched lizard). Of these, Crotalus lorenzoensis is endemic to the island—it is found nowhere else. It is abundant on the island.
