= List of islands of Mexico =

Islands of Mexico

This is an incomplete list of islands of Mexico.

== Oceanic Islands (In the Pacific Ocean) ==
Oceanic Islands of the Pacific
Name	Location	Height	Area
Clarion Island	18°21′32″N 114°43′19″W	335 m (1,099 ft)	19.80 km^{2} (7.64 sq mi)
Guadalupe Island	29°1′51″N 118°16′48″W	1,298 m (4,259 ft)	244 km^{2} (94 sq mi)
Revillagigedo Archipelago	18°49′N 112°46′W	1,130 m (3,707 ft)	157.81 km^{2} (60.93 sq mi)
Roca Partida	18°59′50″N 112°03′54″W	34 m (112 ft)	800 m^{2} (8,600 sq ft)
Rocas Alijos	24°57′31″N 115°44′59″W	34 m (112 ft)	<1,000 m^{2} (11,000 sq ft)
San Benedicto Island	19°18′16″N 110°48′52″W	332 m (1,089 ft)	10 km^{2} (3.9 sq mi)
Socorro Island	18°47′04″N 110°58′30″W	1,150 m (3,773 ft)	132 km^{2} (51 sq mi)

== Islands on the continental shelf ==
=== Pacific Coast ===
Pacific Coast Islands
Name	State	Location	Height	Area	Notes
Isla Abaroa	Baja California Sur	26°45′10″N 113°12′38″W			
Isla Adelaida	Baja California	28°40′11″N 114°16′41″W			
Aditnalta	Oaxaca	16°20′N 94°49′W			
Isla Ana	Baja California	26°42′15″N 113°12′23″W			
Isla Asunción	Baja California Sur	27°06′13″N 114°17′35″W			
Isla Cedros	Baja California	28°10′58″N 115°13′04″W	1,205 m (3,953 ft)	348.3 km^{2} (134.5 sq mi)	
Isla Cocinas	Jalisco	19°32′56″N 105°06′34″W			
Isla Coronado Centro	Baja California	32°25′N 117°16′W		0.14 km^{2} (0.054 sq mi)	
Isla Coronado Norte	Baja California	32°26′N 117°18′W		0.48 km^{2} (0.19 sq mi)	Northernmost island of Mexico
Isla Coronado Sur	Baja California	32°25′N 117°15′W	180 m (590 ft)	1.83 km^{2} (0.71 sq mi)	
Isla Cresciente	Baja California Sur	24°22′19″N 111°35′45″W			
Isla de Coral	Nayarit	21°02′53″N 105°16′23″W			
Isla Delgadito	Baja California	26°38′18″N 113°06′12″W			
Isla Iglecias	Jalisco	19°13′36″N 104°48′55″W			
Isla Ixtapa	Guerrero	17°40′35″N 101°39′29″W	23 m (75 ft)	0.34 km^{2} (0.13 sq mi)	
Isla La Blanca	Oaxaca	15°56′28″N 95°34′32″W			
Isla La Montosa	Oaxaca	15°45′50″N 96°05′03″W			
Isla La Roqueta	Guerrero	16°49′17″N 99°54′31″W			
Isla Las Animas	Guerrero	17°18′35″N 101°04′13″W			
Isla Magdalena	Baja California Sur	24°50′N 112°14′W		231 km^{2} (89 sq mi)	
Isla María Cleophas	Nayarit	21°18′47″N 106°14′52″W			
Isla María Madre	Nayarit	21°37′15″N 106°34′52″W			
Isla María Magdalena	Nayarit	21°27′39″N 106°25′31″W			
Isla Natividad	Baja California Sur	27°52′33″N 115°11′05″W		8.66 km^{2} (3.34 sq mi)	
Isla Pajarera	Jalisco	19°33′31″N 105°06′48″W			
Isla San Jerónimo	Baja California	29°47′31″N 115°47′31″W			
Isla San Martin	Baja California	30°29′20″N 116°06′51″W	125 m (410 ft)		
Isla San Juanito	Nayarit	21°44′56″N 106°40′31″W			
Isla San Roque	Baja California Sur	27°08′50″N 114°22′40″W			
Isla Santa Margarita	Baja California Sur	24°26′N 111°50′W		314 km^{2} (121 sq mi)	
Isla Santo Domingo	Baja California Sur	25°22′13″N 112°06′38″W	125 m (410 ft)		
Isla Tamarindo	Jalisco	19°13′57″N 104°48′48″W			
Isla Todos Santos	Baja California	31°47′59″N 116°47′20″W	45 m (148 ft)		
Islas Marietas	Nayarit	20°42′02″N 105°34′51″W			
Islas San Benito	Baja California	28°18′12″N 115°35′24″W		3.9 km^{2} (1.5 sq mi)	
Islote Pena Blanca	Colima	19°06′12″N 104°29′13″W			
Morros de Potosí	Guerrero	17°31′57″N 101°29′44″W			
Pilón de Azúcar	Baja California	32°25′N 117°16′W		0.07 km^{2} (0.027 sq mi)	

=== Gulf of California ===
Islands in Gulf of California
Name	State	Location	Height	Area
Altamura Island	Sinaloa	24°53′00″N 108°08′00″W		101.17 km^{2} (39.06 sq mi)
Isla Ángel de la Guarda	Baja California	29°15′36″N 113°22′13″W	1,300 m (4,265 ft)	931 km^{2} (359 sq mi)
Isla Aremar aka Isla Rasita		29°00′52.30″N 113°30′19.40″W		
Isla Ballena	Baja California Sur	24°28′55.97″N 110°24′15.60″W	30 m (98 ft)	
Isla Bota	Baja California	29°00′38.69″N 113°30′51.92″W	100 ft (30 m)	
Isla Cabeza de Caballo	Baja California	28°58′17.45″N 113°28′43.28″W	331 ft (101 m)	
Isla Calavera	Baja California	29°01′39.60″N 113°29′55.50″W	100 ft (30 m)	
Isla Cerraja	Baja California	28°59′48.33″N 113°31′9.10″W	49 ft (15 m)	
Isla Carmen	Baja California	25°12′01.0″N 110°41′53.0″W		150 km^{2} (58 sq mi)
Isla Cayo	Baja California Sur			
Isla Cerralvo (Isla Jacques Cousteau)	Baja California Sur	24°13′17″N 109°52′14″W		136.5 km^{2} (52.7 sq mi)
Isla Coronadito	Baja California	29°05′54.3″N 113°31′43.1″W		
Isla Coronado (Isla Smith)	Baja California	29°04′26.19″N 113°30′31.34″W	1,554 ft (474 m)	
Isla Coronados	Baja California Sur			
Isla Costanazo	Baja California	29°59′36.4″N 114°23′23.7″W		
Isla Danzante	Baja California Sur	25°47′11.06″N 111°15′3.85″W	320 m (1,050 ft)	
Isla Espíritu Santo	Baja California Sur	24°28′17″N 110°19′57″W		80.76 km^{2} (31.18 sq mi)
Isla El Coyote				
Isla El Muerto		30°5′19.2″N 114°32′35.8″W	490 ft (149 m)	
Isla El Requeson				
Isla Flecha		29°00′18.78″N 113°31′20.28″W	203 ft (62 m)	
Isla Gallo				
Isla Gallina				
Isla Granito	Baja California	29°33′52.31″N 113°32′22.74″W	50 m (160 ft)	
Isla Huivili		27°03′43″N 109°58′37″W		
Isla Islitas				
Isla Jalme		30°01′08″N 114°28′23″W		
Isla Jorobado		29°00′43.90″N 113°31′27.50″W		
Isla Las Ánimas				
Islotes Las Galeras				
Isla La Ventana		28°59′46.09″N 113°30′35.08″W	112 ft (34 m)	
Isla Llave		28°59′56.10″N 113°31′13.80″W		
Isla Lobos				
Isla of Rosemary Lambert				
Isla Región		30°1′8.8″N 114°27′58.6″W		
Isla Saliaca				
Isla Miramar				
Isla Mitlan		29°04′1.44″N 113°31′3.90″W		
Isla Montague	Baja California			
Isla Monserrate				
Isla Mosca				
Isla Partida		24°33′45″N 110°22′42″W		
Isla Pata (Paw Island)		29°00′51.6″N 113°30′50.9″W		
Isla Pardo				
Isla Patos		29°16′19.1″N 112°27′37.3″W		
Isla Piojo		29°01′4.43″N 113°27′54.58″W	223 ft (68 m)	
Isla Pitahaya	Baja California Sur			
Isla Raza				
Isla Sacuo		30°3′4.8″N 114°29′21.3″W		
Isla San Cosme				
Isla San Damian				
Isla San Diego		25°12′01″N 110°41′53″W		
Isla San Esteban		28°41′51″N 112°34′39″W		
Isla San Francisco		24°49′50.90″N 110°34′29.25″W		
Isla San Ignacio				
Isla San Ildefonso				
Isla San Lorenzo Sur		28°37′56.10″N 112°48′57.10″W	460 m (1,510 ft)	
Isla San Luis		29°58′17.41″N 114°24′26.30″W	150 m (492 ft)	
Isla San Luis Gonzaga		29°48′51.3″N 114°23′4.1″W		
Isla San Marcos				
Isla San Pedro Nolasco		27°57′59″N 111°22′42″W		
Isla Santa Catalina		25°39′9.53″N 110°46′51.25″W		
Isla Santa Cruz	Baja California Sur			
Islas Santa Inez				
Isla Santiago	Baja California Sur			
Isla Tachichilte				
Isla Tiburón		28°59′20″N 112°22′23″W		1,201 km^{2} (464 sq mi)
Isla Tijeras				
Isla Tortuga	Baja California Sur	27°26′42″N 111°52′51″W		
Islas Twins aka Islas Los Gemelitos		28°57′20.10″N 113°28′43.70″W		

=== Gulf of Mexico / Caribbean ===
Islands in the Gulf of Mexico or Caribbean Sea
Name	Location	Height	Area
Bermeja (Phantom)	22°38′47.6″N 90°51′23.2″W		
Isla Blanca, Quintana Roo	21°24′37″N 86°48′37.9″W		
Carmen Island	18°38′N 91°50′W	3m	115.13 km^{2} (44.45 sq mi)
Isla Contoy	21°30′23″N 86°47′54″W		3.17 km^{2} (1.22 sq mi)
Cozumel	20°25′N 86°55′W	14m	647.33 km^{2} (249.94 sq mi)
Cayos Arcas	22°06′52.5″N 91°23′53.2″W		56.3 acres (0.0880 sq mi)
Great Island			
Isla Holbox	21°32′16″N 87°13′12″W		55.95 km^{2} (21.60 sq mi)
Isla Mujeres	21°14′N 86°44′W		
Arrecife Alacranes	22°22′58″N 89°40′57.8″W		
Western Triangle Keys			

== Inner Islands ==
=== Lake Chapala ===
- Isla de los Alacranes

=== Lake Pátzcuaro ===
- Janitzio, 19°34′26″N 101°39′07″W

=== Lake Texcoco ===
- Xaltocan
