= List of coastal islands of the Californias =

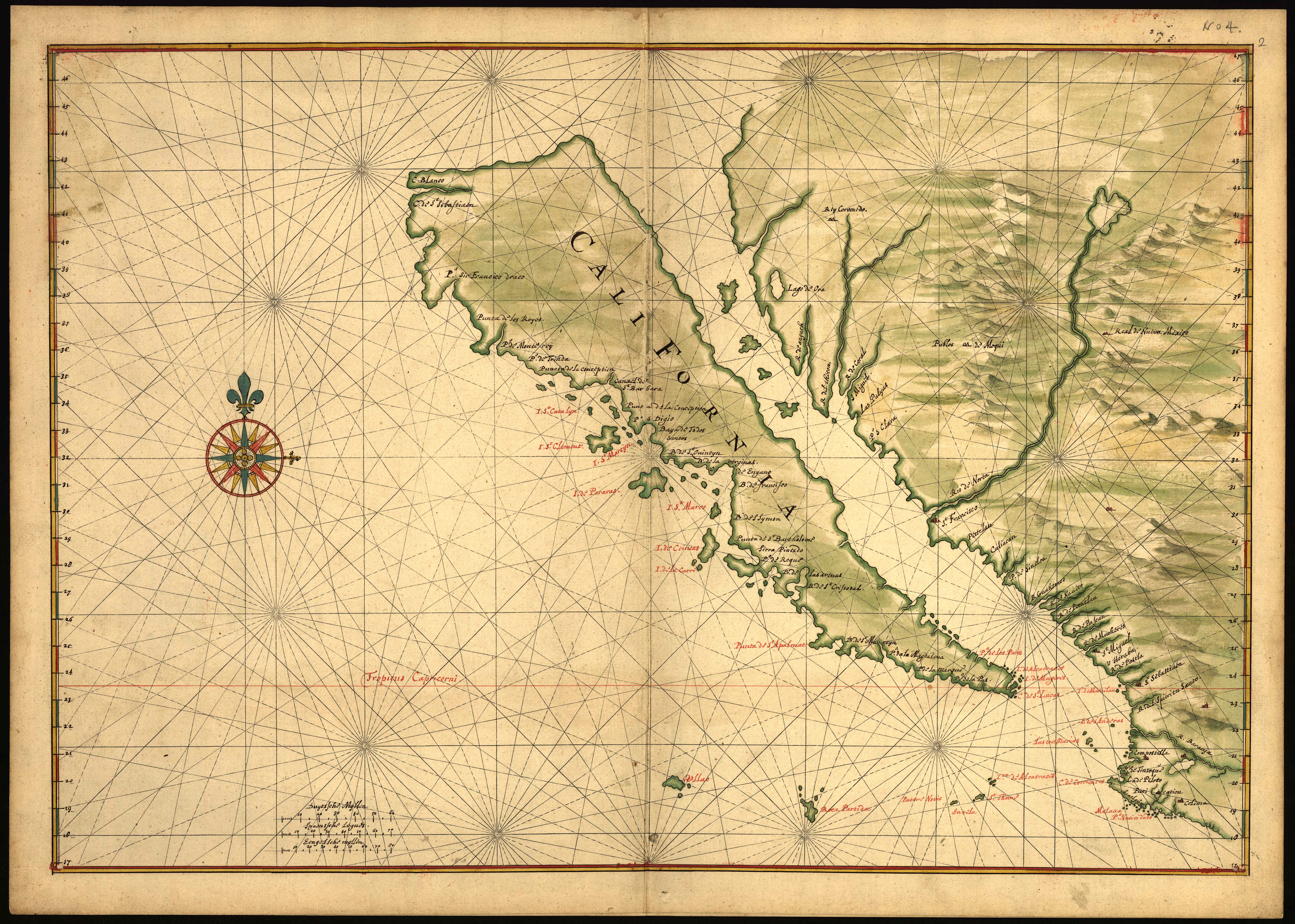
Baja California was mistakenly thought to be an island rather than a peninsula

The Californias region, which comprises California and the Baja California Peninsula, includes many coastal islands in the Pacific Ocean. California is in the United States; and the Baja California Peninsula includes the Mexican states of Baja California Sur and Baja California. Although the waters and islands are in two countries, many of the ecoregion, habitat, conservation, and ecological issues are shared.

== Islands off the Northern and Central California coasts ==
- Farallon Islands
- Año Nuevo Island

== Channel Islands of California ==
- Anacapa Island
- San Miguel Island
- Santa Cruz Island
- Santa Rosa Island
- San Clemente Island
- San Nicolas Island
- Santa Barbara Island
- Santa Catalina Island

== Coastal islands of the Baja California Peninsula ==
- Alijos Rocks
- Cedros Island
- Coronado Islands
- Espiritu Santo Island
- Guadalupe Island
- Natividad Island
- San Benito Islands
- San Esteban Island
- San José Island
- San Lorenzo Island
- Santa Margarita Island
- San Martin Island
- Todos Santos Islands
- Category:Islands of Baja California and Category:Islands of Baja California Sur

== Islands of the Gulf of California ==
- Isla Huivulai
- Isla Ángel de la Guarda
- Isla Ballena
- Isla Cayo
- Isla Coronados
- Isla Danzante
- Isla del Carmen
- Isla El Coyote
- Isla El Requeson
- Isla Espíritu Santo
- Isla Gallina
- Isla Gallo
- Isla Islitas
- Isla Las Animas
- Isla Monserrate
- Isla Mosca
- Isla Pardo
- Isla Partida
- Isla Pitahaya
- Isla San Cosme
- Isla San Damian
- Isla San Francisco
- Isla San Ildefonso
- Isla San José
- Isla Santa Catalina
- Isla Santa Cruz
- Isla Santiago
- Tiburón Island
- Isla Tijeras
- Isla Tortuga
- Islas Santa Inez
- Islotes Las Galeras
- Jacques Cousteau Island
- Montague Island
- San Esteban Island
- San Pedro Nolasco Island
- Tiburón Island

== See also ==
- List of islands of California
- List of islands of Mexico
