= Isla Coronados =

Island in the Gulf of California

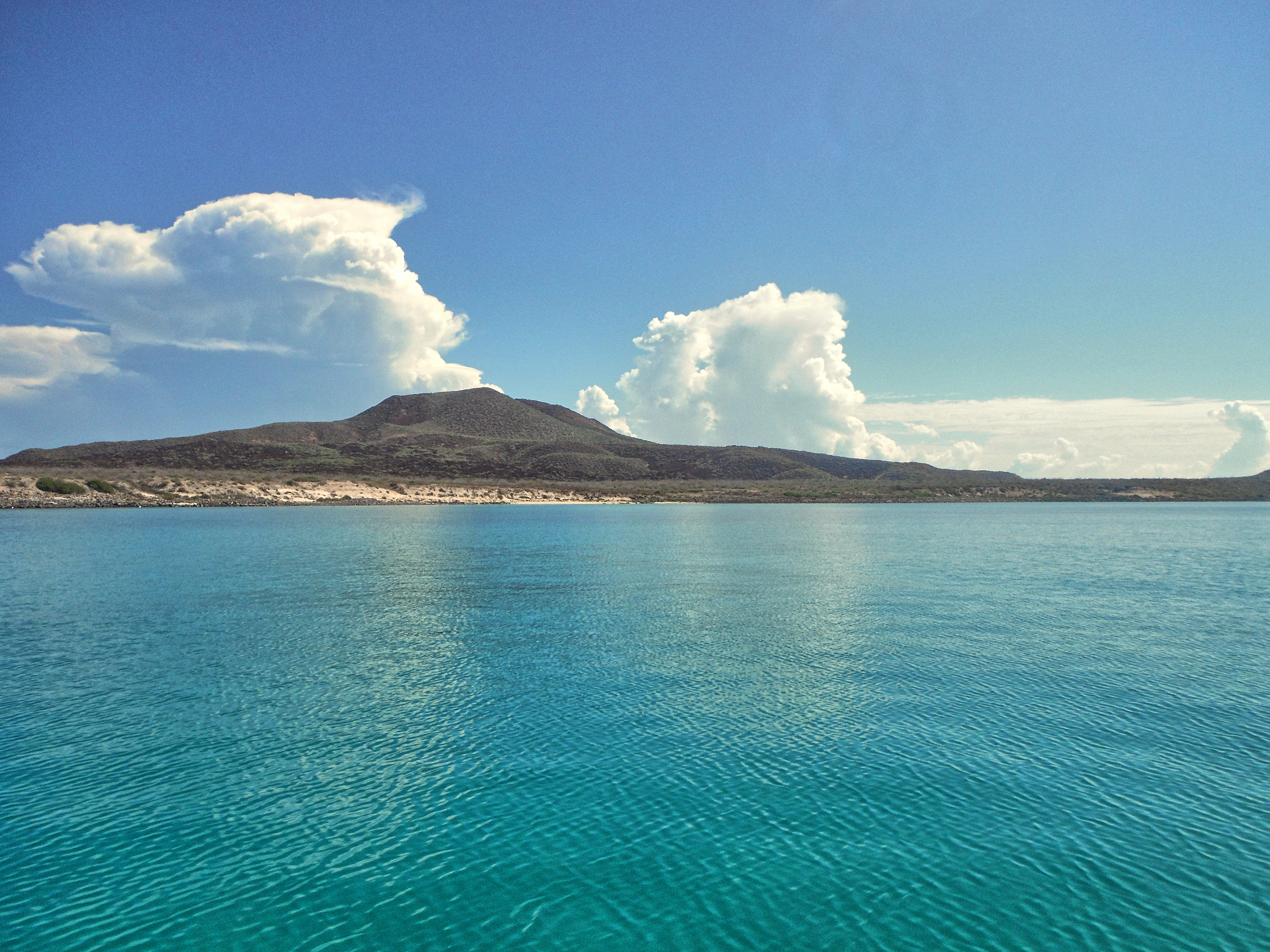
- View of Isla Coronados

- Location within Mexico

Geography
- Location: Gulf of California; Loreto Municipality
- Coordinates: 26°07′8.52″N 111°16′26.73″W
- Highest elevation: 289 m (948 ft)

Administration
- Mexico
- State: Baja California Sur

Demographics
- Population: Uninhabited

Isla Coronados, is an island in the Gulf of California east of the Baja California Peninsula in Baja California Sur state, Mexico. The island is uninhabited and is part of the Loreto Municipality.

== Ecology ==
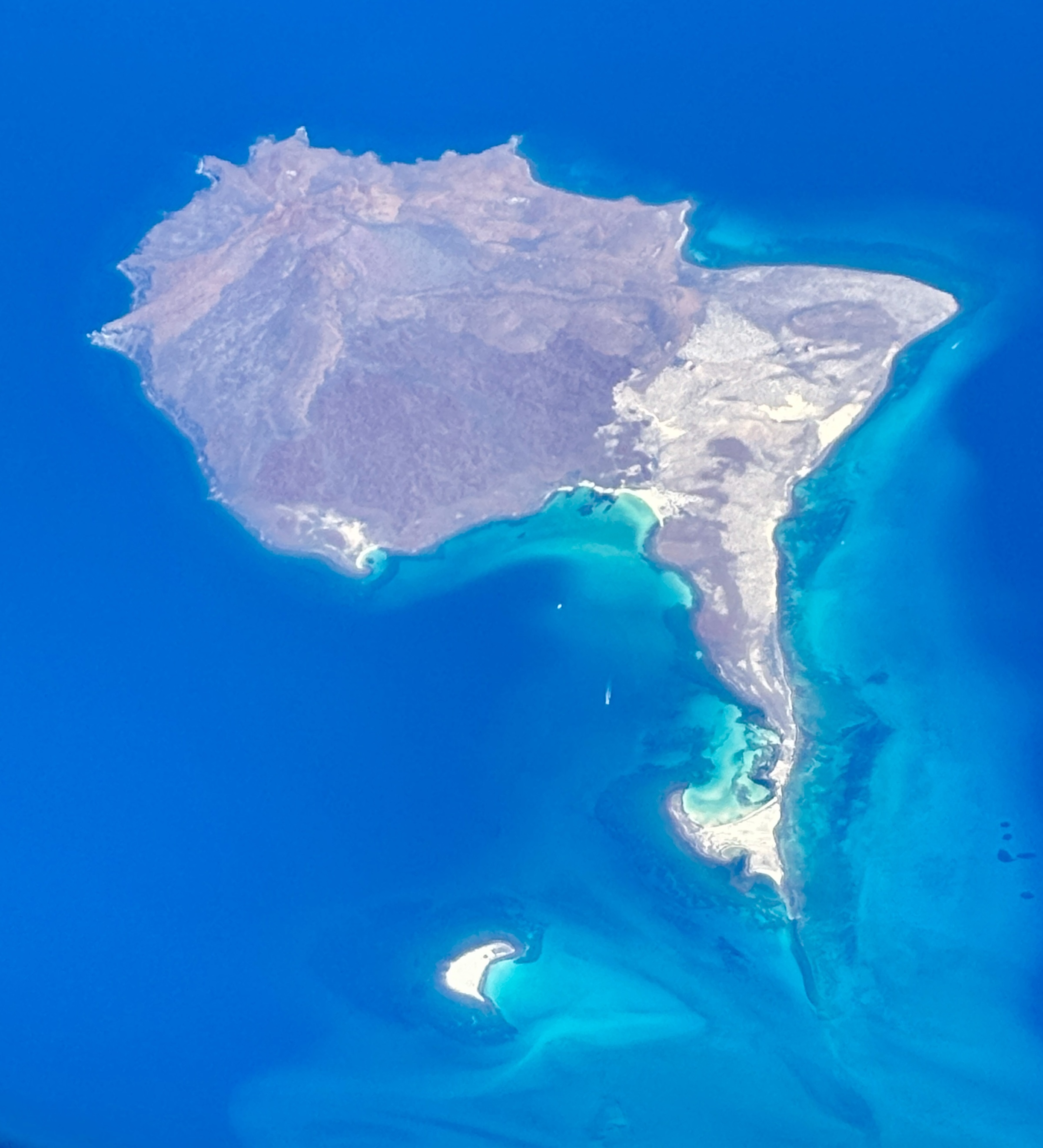
Aerial view

=== Reptilian life ===
Isla Coronados has 16 species of reptiles, including Aspidoscelis hyperythrus (orange-throated whiptail), Aspidoscelis tigris (tiger whiptail), Callisaurus draconoides (zebra-tailed lizard), Coleonyx variegatus (western banded gecko), Coluber fuliginosus (Baja California coachwhip), Crotalus enyo (Baja California rattlesnake), Crotalus ruber (red diamond rattlesnake), Dipsosaurus dorsalis (desert iguana), Hypsiglena ochrorhyncha (coast night snake), Hypsiglena slevini (Baja California night snake), Phyllodactylus nocticolus (peninsular leaf-toed gecko), Sauromalus slevini (Slevin's chuckwalla), Sceloporus orcutti (granite spiny lizard), Sceloporus zosteromus (Baja California spiny lizard), Urosaurus nigricauda (black-tailed brush lizard), and Uta stansburiana (common side-blotched lizard).
