= Isla Danzante =

Island in the Gulf of California

- Location within Mexico

Geography
- Location: Gulf of California
- Coordinates: 25°47′11.06″N 111°15′3.85″W
- Highest elevation: 320 m (1050 ft)

Administration
- Mexico
- State: Baja California Sur

Demographics
- Population: Uninhabited

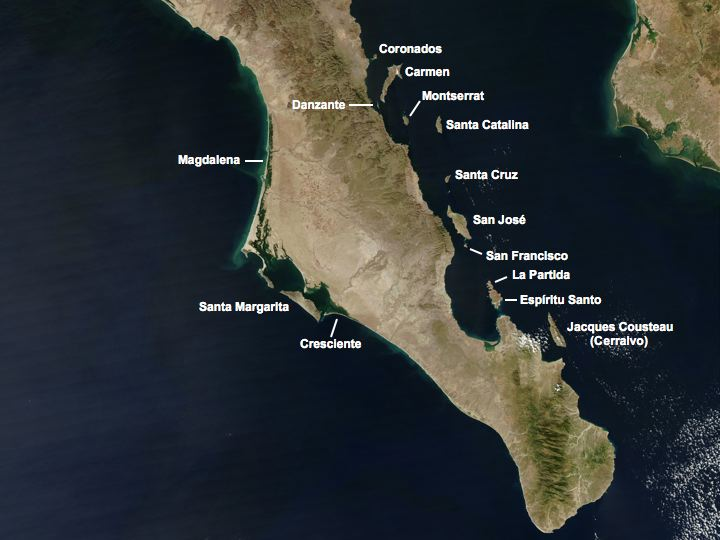
Islands around the Baja California Peninsula

Isla Danzante, is an island in the Gulf of California east of the Baja California Peninsula. The island is uninhabited and is part of the Loreto Municipality.

== Biology ==
Isla Danzante has 16 species of reptiles, including Aspidoscelis tigris (tiger whiptail), Bogertophis rosaliae (Baja California ratsnake), Callisaurus draconoides (zebra-tailed lizard), Chilomeniscus stramineus (variable sandsnake), Coleonyx variegatus (western banded gecko), Coluber fuliginosus (Baja California coachwhip), Crotalus ruber (red diamond rattlesnake), Hypsiglena ochrorhyncha (coast night snake), Hypsiglena slevini (Baja California night snake), Petrosaurus repens (short-nosed rock lizard), Phyllodactylus nocticolus (peninsular leaf-toed gecko), Rena humilis (western threadsnake), Sauromalus slevini (Slevin's chuckwalla), Trimorphodon lyrophanes (California lyresnake), Urosaurus nigricauda (black-tailed brush lizard), and Uta stansburiana (common side-blotched lizard).
