= Isla Gallo =

Island in the Gulf of California

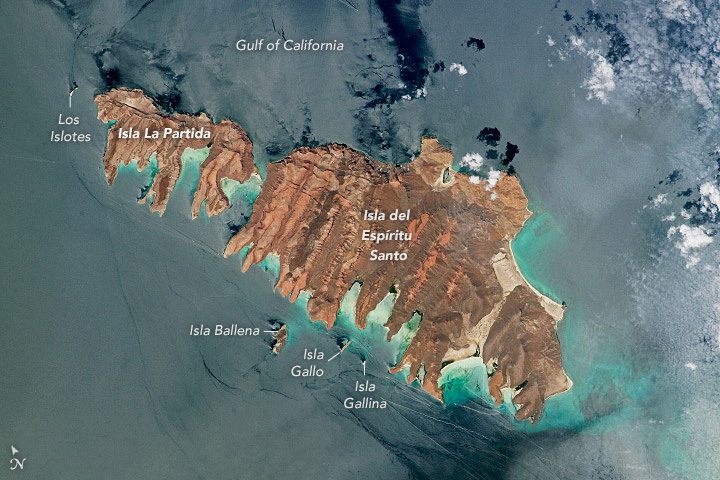
- Isla Gallo (south)

- Location within Mexico

Geography
- Location: Gulf of California
- Coordinates: 24°27′57.72″N 110°23′10.15″W
- Highest elevation: 23 m (75 ft)

Administration
- Mexico
- State: Baja California Sur

Demographics
- Population: Uninhabited

Isla Gallo is an island in the Gulf of California east of the Baja California Peninsula. The island is uninhabited and is part of the La Paz Municipality.

== Biology ==
Isla Gallo has five species of reptile, including Phyllodactylus unctus (San Lucan leaf-toed gecko), Sauromalus ater (common chuckwalla), Sceloporus hunsakeri (Hunsaker's spiny lizard), Urosaurus nigricauda (black-tailed brush lizard), and Uta stansburiana (common side-blotched lizard).
