= Lentisco =

Lentisco is a common name for several plants and may refer to:

- Malosma laurina, native to California
- Pistacia lentiscus, native to the Mediterranean
