= Isla Pardo =

Island in the Gulf of California

- Location within Mexico

Geography
- Location: Gulf of California
- Coordinates: 25°43′50.69″N 111°13′28.75″W
- Highest elevation: 95 m (312 ft)

Administration
- Mexico
- State: Baja California Sur

Demographics
- Population: Uninhabited

Isla Pardo, is an island in the Gulf of California east of the Baja California Peninsula. The island is uninhabited and is part of the Loreto Municipality.

== Biology ==
Isla Pardo has four species of reptiles: Crotalus enyo (Baja California rattlesnake), Phyllodactylus nocticolus (peninsular leaf-toed gecko), Sauromalus ater (common chuckwalla), and Urosaurus nigricauda (black-tailed brush lizard).
