= Isla El Coyote =

Island in the Gulf of California

- Location within Mexico

Geography
- Location: Gulf of California
- Coordinates: 26°44′49.85″N 111°53′19.56″W
- Highest elevation: 15 m (49 ft)

Administration
- Mexico
- State: Baja California Sur

Demographics
- Population: Uninhabited

Isla El Coyote (also known locally as Isla Pardito or El Pardito) is an island in the Gulf of California, located within Bahía Concepción east of the Baja California Peninsula. The island is meant to be uninhabited and is part of the Mulegé Municipality, but it is reported that members of a family with a colorful history have been inhabiting the island since the 1940s.

== Biology ==
Isla El Coyote has three species of reptiles: Phyllodactylus nocticolus (peninsular leaf-toed gecko), Sauromalus ater (common chuckwalla), and Urosaurus nigricauda (black-tailed brush lizard). There are no amphibians.
