= Clinton Gilbert Abbott =

American ornithologist and naturalist

- San Diego Natural History Museum Director Clinton G. Abbott in January, 1940
- Born: April 17, 1881; Liverpool, England
- Died: March 5, 1946 (aged 64); San Diego, California
- Education: Columbia University; Cornell University
- Scientific career
- Fields: Ornithology, Mammalogy, Natural History
- Institutions: San Diego Natural History Museum

Clinton Gilbert Abbott (1881 – 1946) was an American ornithologist, naturalist, and director of the San Diego Natural History Museum from 1922 to 1946. Abbott supervised the construction of the museum's current building in Balboa Park, expanded research field trips and expeditions, and participated in important conservation efforts in southern California and the Baja California region. He was instrumental in the preservation of the southern California desert area that became Anza-Borrego Desert State Park.

== Biography ==
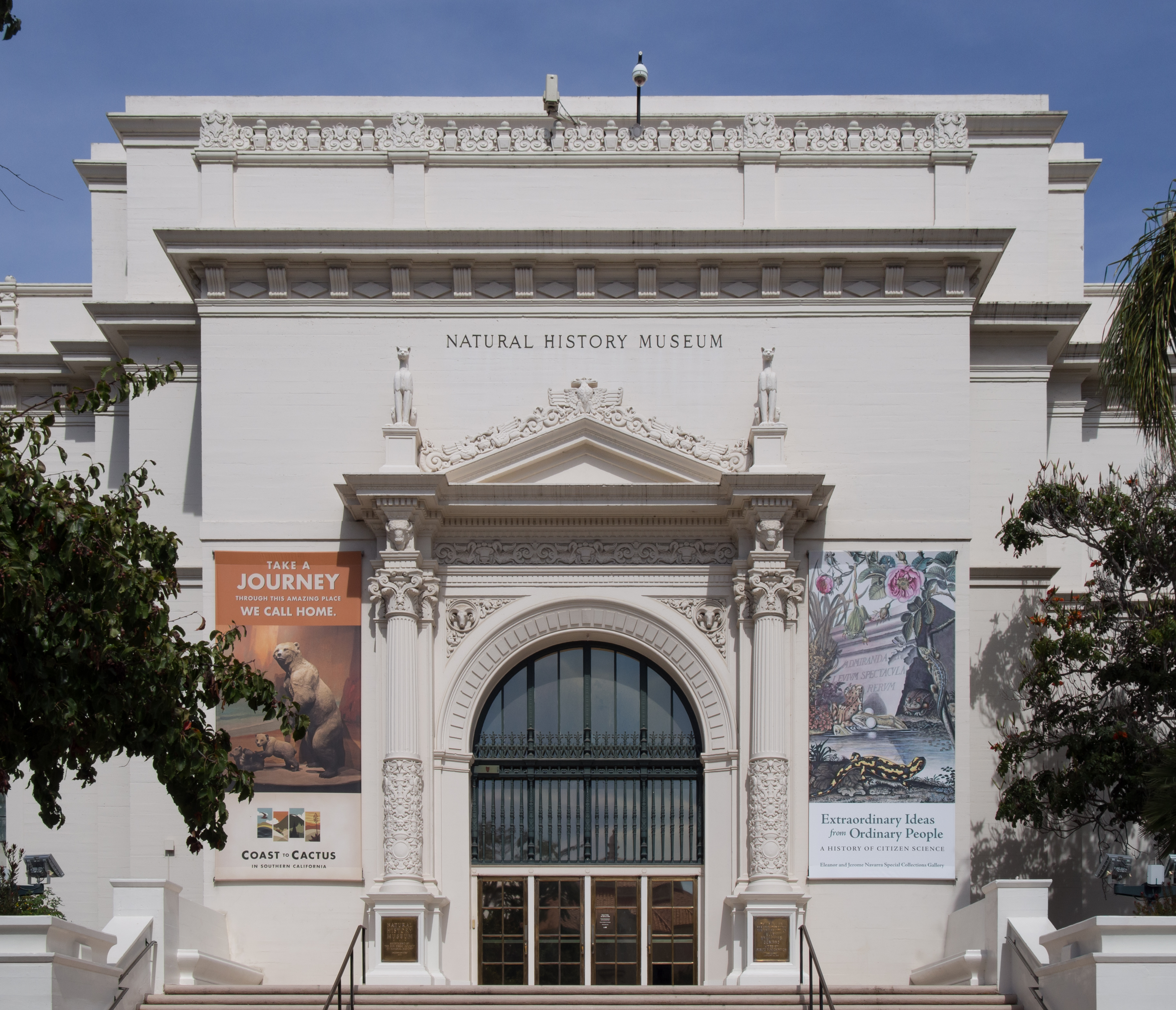
The San Diego Natural History Museum, designed by William Templeton Johnson. Abbott was director of the museum from 1922 to 1946.

The son of American citizens, Clinton Gilbert Abbott was born in Liverpool, England, on April 17, 1881, to Grace Van Dusen and Lewis Lowe Abbott. Abbott's older brother was the writer and freethinker Leonard Dalton Abbott. Abbott received an A.B. degree from Columbia University in 1903 and pursued graduate studies at Cornell University. He married Dorothy Clarke in 1915. From 1910 to 1914, Abbott was vice-president of the Linnaean Society of New York, and from 1918 to 1921 worked as secretary and editor for the New York State Conservation Commission.

In 1921, Abbott took charge of public education programs at the San Diego Natural History Museum, becoming director of the museum in 1922. He served as the President of the San Diego Natural History Society from 1923 to 1925. Abbott was director of the museum from 1922 to 1946.

Under Abbott's leadership, the museum expanded its research and conservation work, education, and public programming, and in 1932, the museum moved into its current building, designed by noted San Diego architect William Templeton Johnson. In 1927, Abbott proposed the creation of a conservation area in the Borrego Palm Canyon and Thousand Palms Canyon areas east of San Diego; in 1933, Borego Palms Desert State Park was created, a 185,000-acre beginning for what would become the 600,000 acre Anza-Borrego Desert State Park.

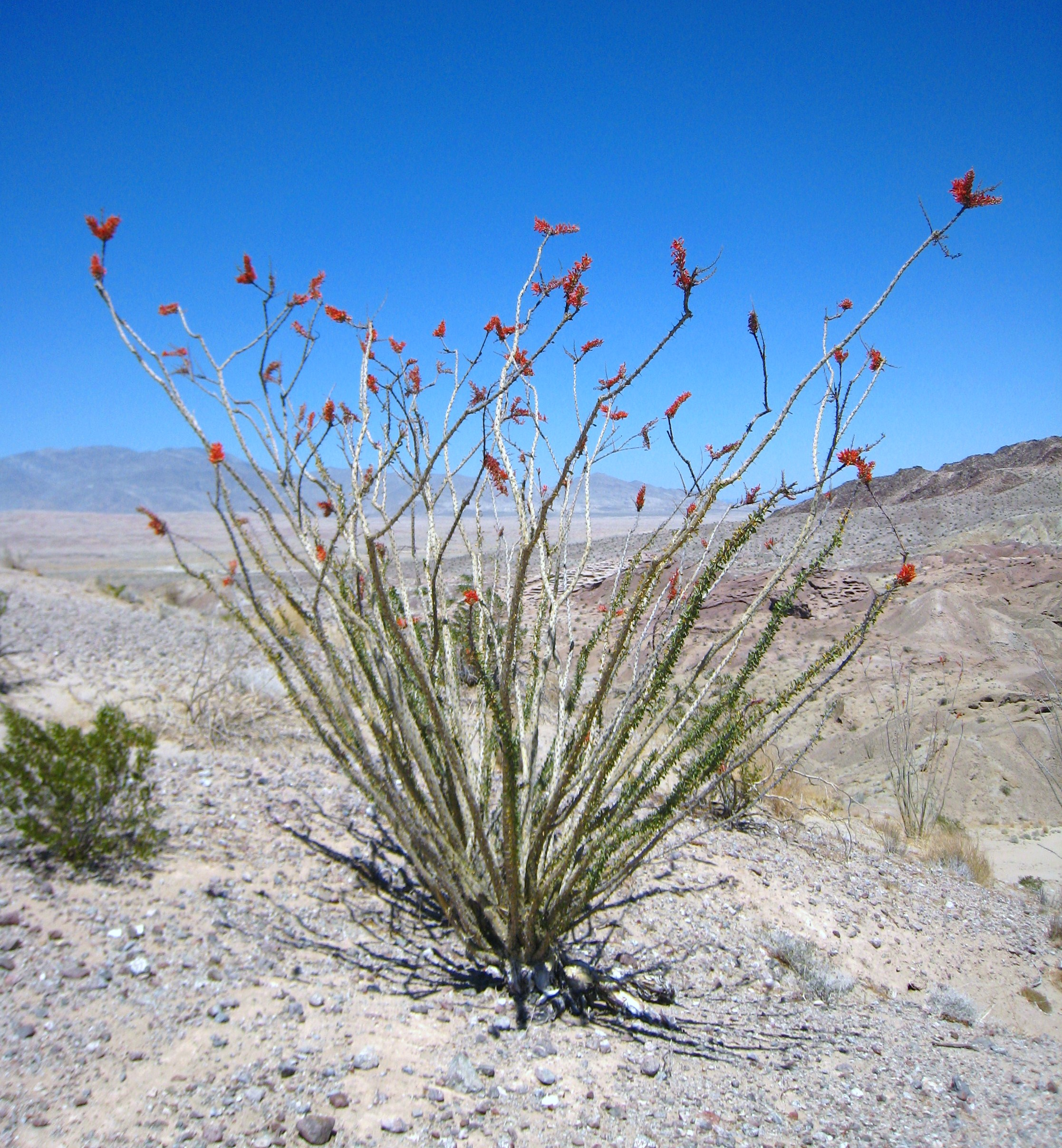
Abbott proposed the establishment of a state park in the Borrego Valley. (Flowering Ocotillo Fouquieria splendens photographed above Hawk Canyon at Anza-Borrego Desert State Park, California)

Abbott was a member of the American Ornithologists Union, the Western Society of Naturalists, the Cooper Ornithological Society, the National Audubon Society, the International Committee for Wildlife Protection, the American Society of Mammalogists, and many other professional societies.

Abbott died in San Diego, California, on March 5, 1946.

== Legacy ==
Abbott is commemorated in the scientific name of a subspecies of gecko, Coleonyx variegatus abbotti.

== Publications available online ==
- Abbott, Clinton Gilbert. 'The Home-Life of the Osprey'. London, Witherby & co., 1911. https://archive.org/details/homelifeofosprey00abbo.
- Abbott, Clinton G. 'Friends and Foes of Wild Life. A Discussion of Certain Predacious Birds and Animals from the Standpoint of the Sportsman, Trapper and Farmer'. Albany: J.B. Lyon company, printers, 1919. https://www.biodiversitylibrary.org/bibliography/36674.

== Selected bibliography ==
- Abbott, Clinton G. (Feb 1944). "Roof-Nesting Killdeers". Condor. 46 (1): 3–5. doi:10.2307/1364242. JSTOR 1364242.
- —— (July 1941). "Observations at Guaymas, Sonora, Mexico". The Auk. 58 (3): 416–18. doi:10.2307/4078982. JSTOR 4078982.
- —— (1940). "Alfred Webster Anthony". Journal of Mammalogy. 21 (2): 244–45. doi:10.2307/1374984. JSTOR 1374984.
- —— (1939). "Sea Lion Slaughter". Bird Lore. 41 (193): 265–70.
- —— (May 1935). "Bears in San Diego County, California". Journal of Mammalogy. 16 (2): 149–51. doi:10.1093/jmammal/16.2.149.
- —— (February 1933). "Closing History of the Guadalupe Caracara". Condor. 35 (1): 10–14. doi:10.2307/1363459. JSTOR 1363459.
- —— (Oct 1930). "Urban Burrowing Owls". The Auk. 47 (4): 564–65. doi:10.2307/4075879. JSTOR 4075879.
- —— (1930). "California Record of a Sharp-Headed Finner Whale". Journal of Mammalogy. 11 (2): 240–41. doi:10.1093/jmammal/11.2.240-b.
- —— (1926). "Peculiar Nesting Site of a Dusky Warbler". Condor. 28 (2): 57–60. doi:10.2307/1362920. JSTOR 1362920.
- —— (1907). "Summer Bird-Life of the Newark, New Jersey, Marshes". The Auk. 24 (1): 1–11. doi:10.2307/4070331. JSTOR 4070331.
