= Isla San Ildefonso =

Island in the Gulf of California

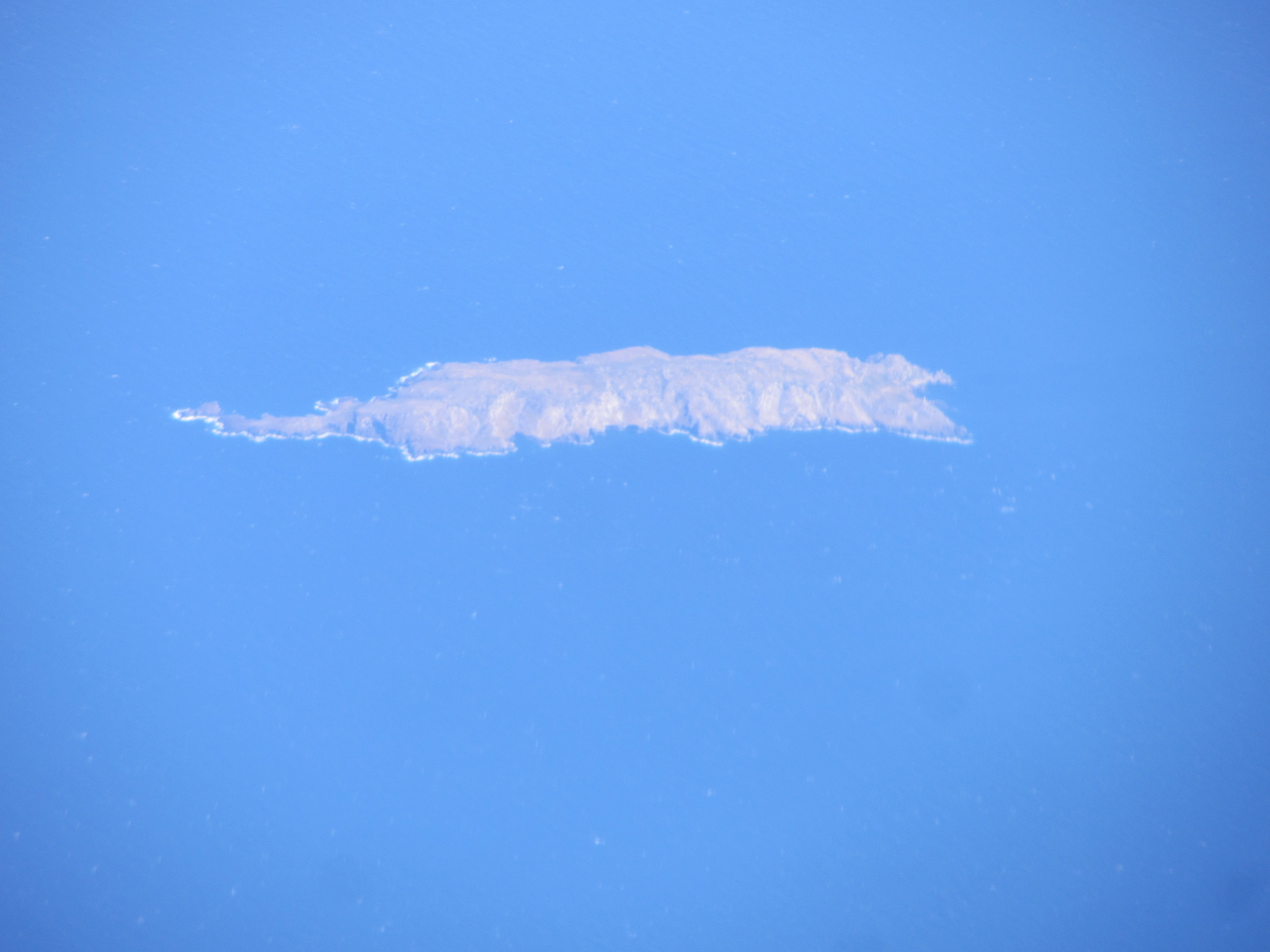
- Isla San Ildefonso

- Location within Mexico

Geography
- Location: Gulf of California
- Coordinates: 26°37′56.92″N 111°25′47.60″W
- Highest elevation: 150 m (490 ft)

Administration
- Mexico
- State: Baja California Sur

Demographics
- Population: Uninhabited

Isla San Ildefonso, is an island in the Gulf of California east of the Baja California Peninsula. The island is uninhabited and is part of the Mulegé Municipality.

== Biology ==
Isla San Ildefonso has four species of reptile: Coluber flagellum (coachwhip), Phyllodactylus nocticolus (peninsular leaf-toed gecko), Sceloporus orcutti (granite spiny lizard), and Uta stansburiana (common side-blotched lizard).
