= Isla Cayo =

Island in the Gulf of California

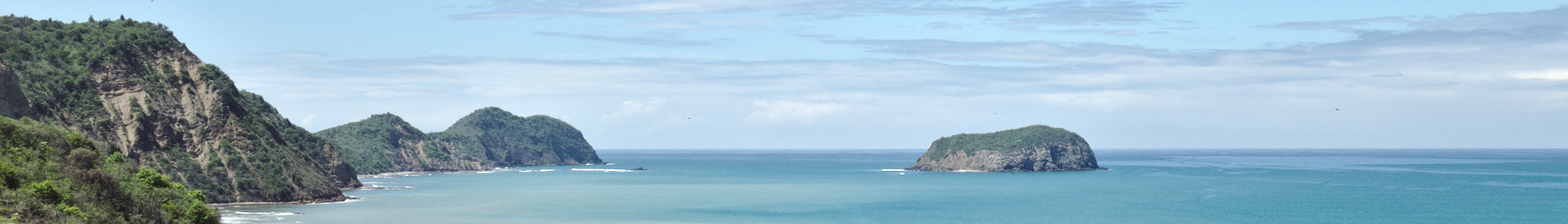
- View of Isla Cayo from Puerto Cayo

- Location within Mexico

Geography
- Location: Gulf of California
- Coordinates: 24°52′30.48″N 110°36′13.03″W
- Highest elevation: 20 m (70 ft)

Administration
- Mexico
- State: Baja California Sur

Demographics
- Population: Uninhabited

Isla Cayo, is an island in the Gulf of California east of the Baja California Peninsula. The island is uninhabited and is part of the La Paz Municipality.

== Biology ==
Isla Cayo has two species of reptiles: Phyllodactylus nocticolus (peninsular leaf-toed gecko), and Urosaurus nigricauda (black-tailed brush lizard).
