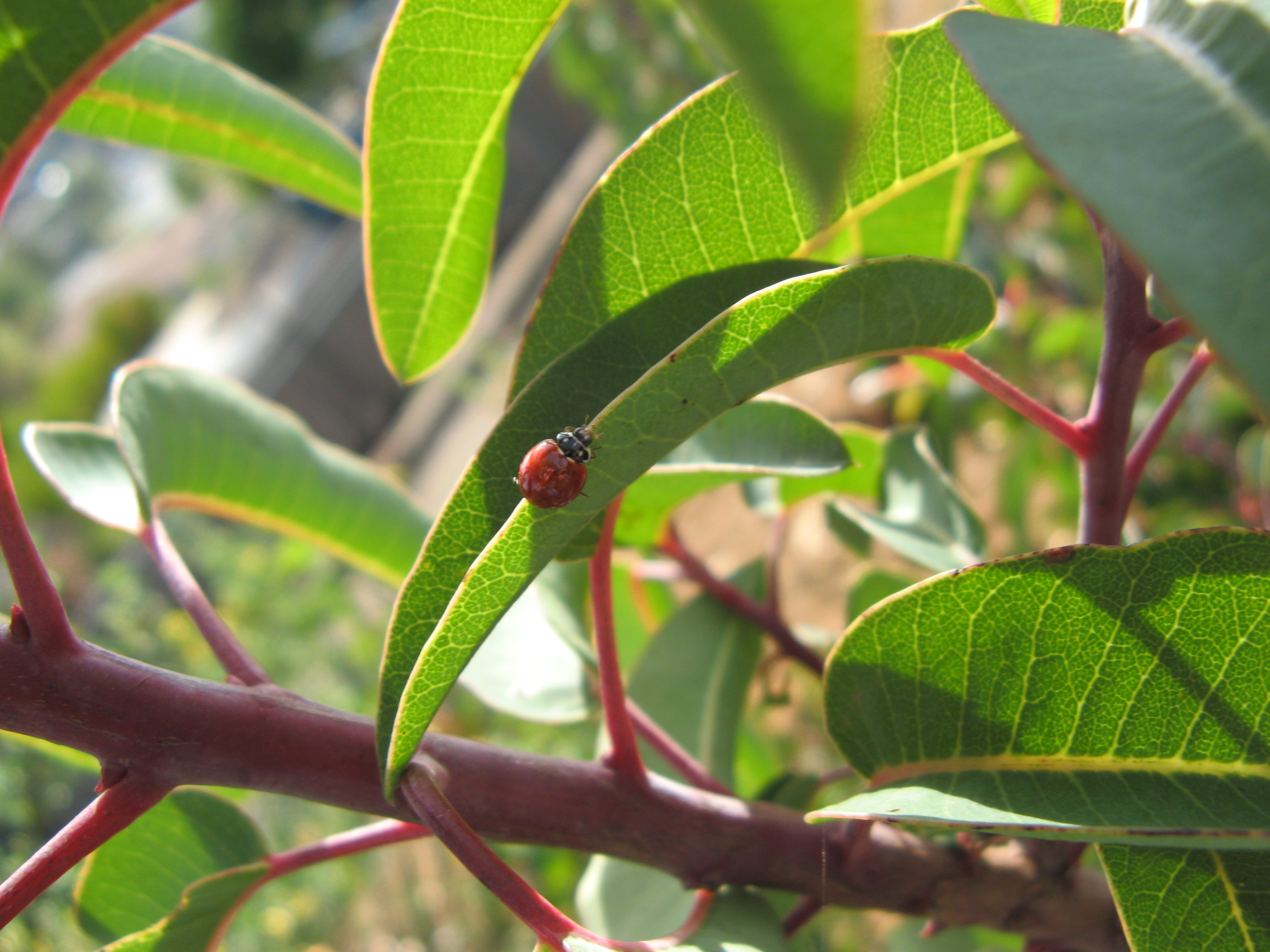
- Malosma laurina, the Laurel sumac

Scientific classification
- Kingdom: Plantae
- Clade: Tracheophytes
- Clade: Angiosperms
- Clade: Eudicots
- Clade: Rosids
- Order: Sapindales
- Family: Anacardiaceae
- Subfamily: Anacardioideae
- Genus: Malosma; Nutt. ex Abrams
- Species: M. laurina

Binomial name
- Malosma laurina (Nutt.) Nutt. ex Abrams

= Malosma =

Laurel sumac

Genus of trees

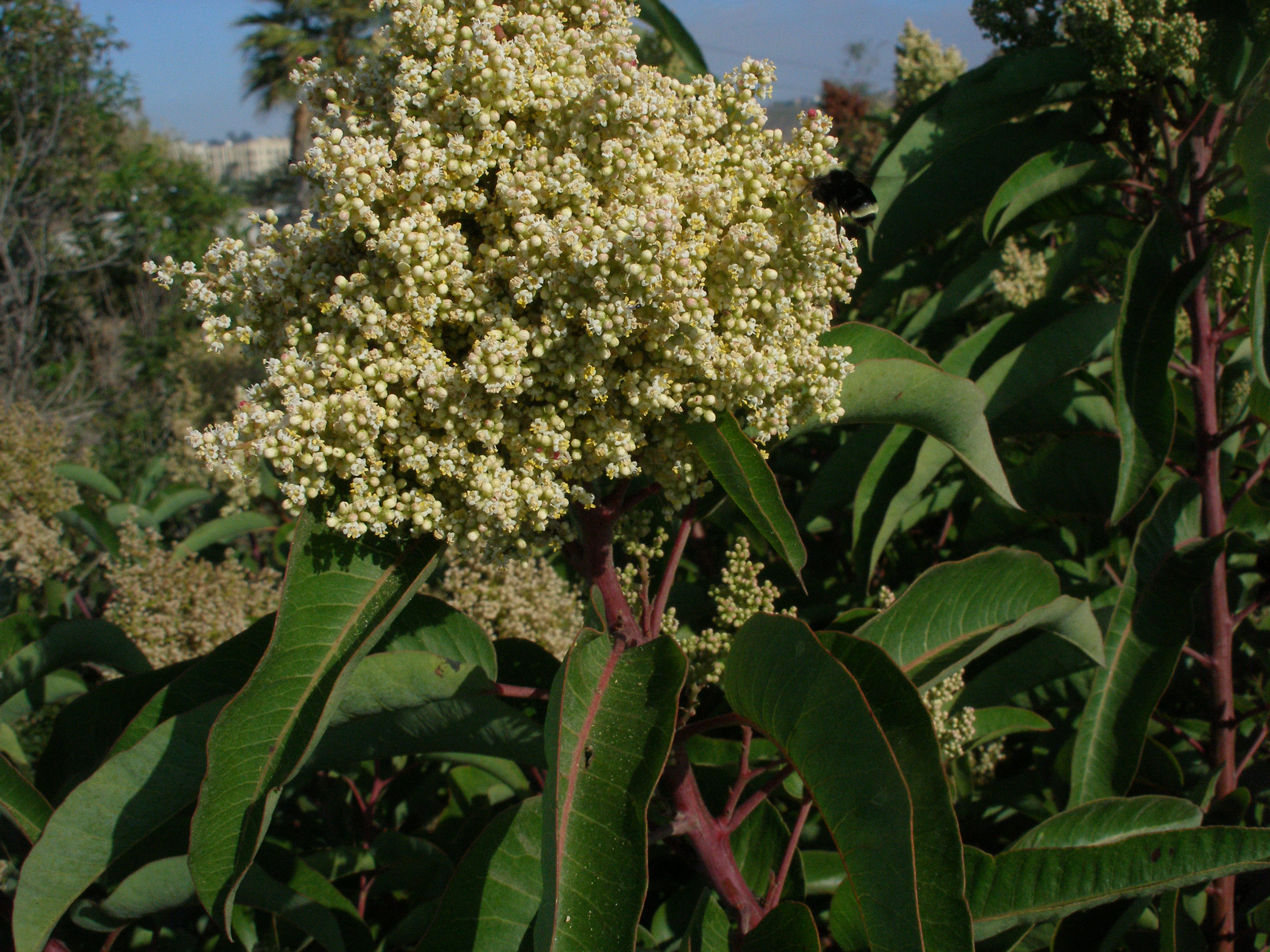
Malosma laurina in bloom. The bumblebee on the right side of the flower cluster (and near its middle) sets the scale of the photograph.

Malosma is a monotypic genus comprising the species Malosma laurina. The species is an evergreen tree or shrub belonging to the sumac family, Anacardiaceae, native to the Pacific coast regions of southern California and Baja California, as well as the southeastern California Channel Islands, and some of the Pacific islands of Baja California. It is known as laurel sumac and lentisco (Spanish).

== Description ==
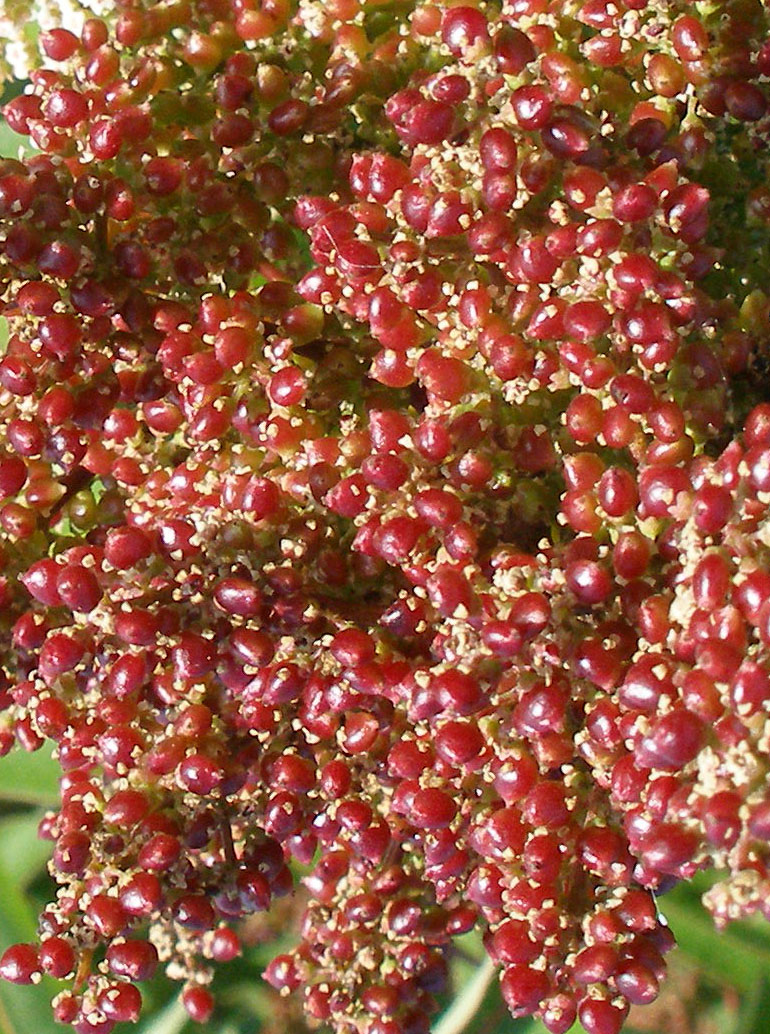
Fruits of Malosma laurina.

Malosma laurina is a large, rounded evergreen shrub or small tree growing 3 to 5 meters (9.8 to 16.4 ft) tall.

The leaves have a taco shell shape. When flattened, they have the shape of laurel leaves, with lance-shaped leaf blades up to 10 cm (3.9 in) long. The tips of the stems, little stem attaching the leaf to the stems (petiole), the veins of the leaves, and the edges of the leaves, are a glowing reddish color all year long.

The fragrant leaves and stems give chaparral its characteristic fragrance. The leaves and stems are full of volatile compounds that give it the scent. Laurel sumac has adapted to fire return intervals of 50-100+ years in the chaparral areas where it grows, and after a fire burns its above ground parts, a large burl underground resprouts new stems and leaves.

In southern California where it grows, the winters are relatively wet and the summers are dry (a Mediterranean climate). The laurel sumac grows new leaves and stems all year long, even during dry season. Most other plants where it grows stop growing leaves during the summer dry season and focus their energies on their root systems. The fragrant saps flow through laurel sumac all year to supply the leaves. One effect of this is that laurel sumac is one of the first plants that resprout after a fire, before the winter rains cause other plants to stop being dormant for the dry season. Another effect is that the parasitic plant (a plant that grows into other plants, not the soil) California dodder (Cuscuta californica), which dies in the summer on other plants, can be seen covering laurel sumac in large stringy "cobwebs" of yellow/orange color.

Laurel sumac is sensitive to cold and tolerates extended freezing conditions poorly. Orange growers in the early history of southern California used to pick places to plant their oranges based on where laurel sumac was growing because this indicated it would not get too cold for oranges if laurel sumac could grow there.

The very small flowers have five white petals and five-lobed green sepals. Large clusters of these flowers occur at the ends of twigs in late spring and early summer. The clusters (panicles) are 7–15 cm (3 to 6 ") long, and are reminiscent of lilac (see photo). The fruit is a whitish drupe 3 mm (1/8 in) in diameter with a smooth, flattish stone inside (see photo).

In bloom, the flowers give off a "woodsy-herbal" smell that is likened to both green apples and turpentine.

== Distribution ==
Malosma laurina is distributed along the southern California coastline (primarily from Point Conception south to La Paz), and on several of the Channel Islands lying off the coast. Several records of the species have also been made north of Point Conception, around the city of Arroyo Grande, California. Malosma laurina is not frost-hardy.

Malosma laurina occurs in coastal sage scrub, chaparral, and oak woodland formations. It occasionally grows in nearly pure stands in coastal sage scrub; more frequently, it codominates with California sagebrush (Artemisia californica) and black, white, or purple sage (Salvia mellifera, S. apiana, or S. leucophylla). In mixed chaparral, it often codominates with bigpod ceanothus (Ceanothus megacarpus) and greenbark ceanothus (C. spinosus). In woodlands, Malosma laurina is an understory associate with Engelmann oak (Quercus engelmannii), valley oak (Q. lobata), coast live oak (Q. agrifolia), and California black walnut (Juglans californica).

== Naming ==
The common name "laurel" was chosen because the foliage is reminiscent of bay laurel – Laurus nobilis, an otherwise unrelated shrub and small tree of the Mediterranean Basin. The species was previously assigned to the genus Rhus, and was known as Rhus laurina.

== Cultivation ==
Malosma laurina is commonly utilized as a landscape plant for native plant or xeriscape gardens, as well as for wildlife gardens, in frost-free areas.

Naturally occurring plants have been used as "sentinel plants" by avocado and citrus growers to help indicate areas that are free of frost and suitable for their orchards in Southern California.

== Use ==
The Chumash crushed and ate the dried fruits of Malosma laurina — perhaps as a flour or meal — and also used the root bark to make a tea for treating dysentery.
