= Isla Santa Inés =

Island in the Gulf of California

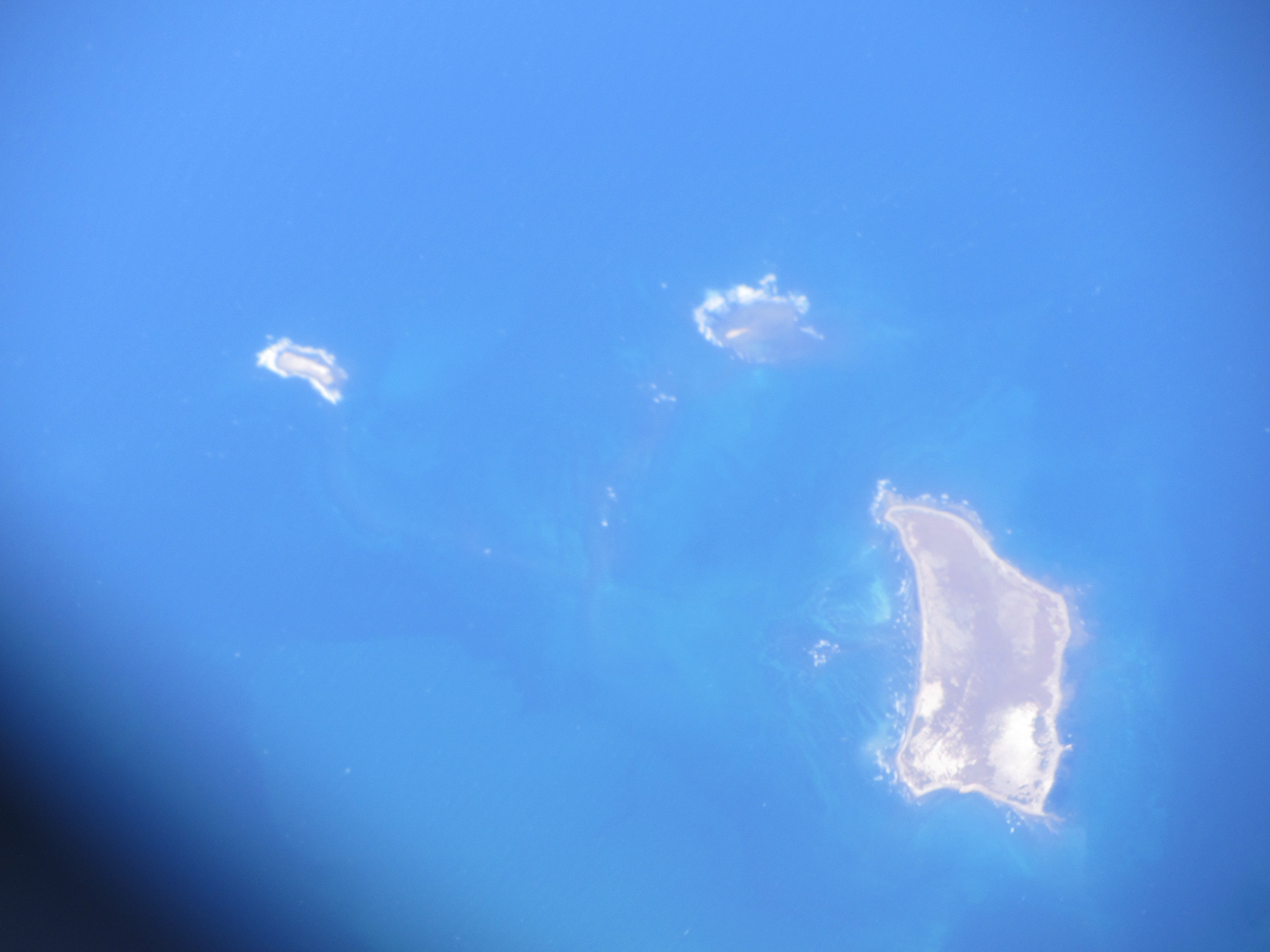
- Aerial view of Isla Santa Inés

- Location within Mexico

Geography
- Location: Gulf of California
- Coordinates: 27°02′15.22″N 111°54′45.63″W
- Highest elevation: 20 m (70 ft)

Administration
- Mexico
- State: Baja California Sur

Demographics
- Population: Uninhabited

Isla Santa Inés is an island group in the Gulf of California east of the Baja California Peninsula. The island is uninhabited and is part of the Mulegé Municipality in the Mexican state of Baja California Sur.

== Biology ==
Isla Santa Inés has two species of reptiles: Callisaurus draconoides (zebra-tailed lizard) and Coleonyx variegatus (western banded gecko).
