= Isla Ballena =

Island in the Gulf of California

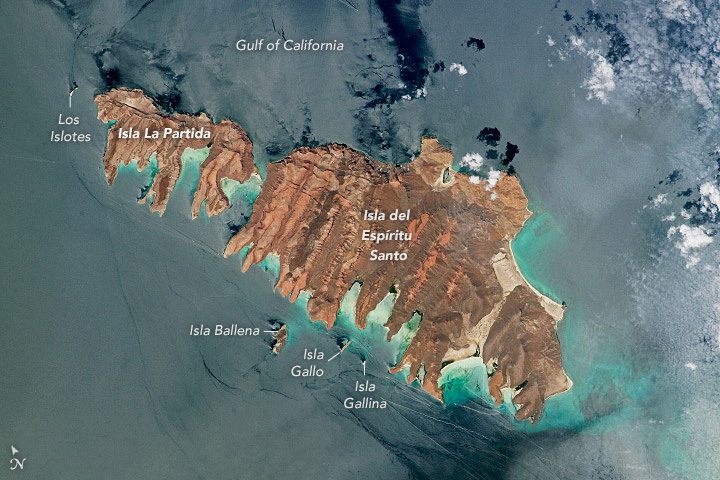
- Isla Ballena (south)

- Location within Mexico

Geography
- Location: Gulf of California
- Coordinates: 24°28′55.97″N 110°24′15.60″W
- Highest elevation: 30 m (100 ft)

Administration
- Mexico
- State: Baja California Sur

Demographics
- Population: Uninhabited

Isla Ballena, is an island in the Gulf of California east of the Baja California Peninsula. The island is uninhabited and is part of the La Paz Municipality.

== Biology ==
Isla Ballena has five species of reptiles: Phyllodactylus unctus (San Lucan leaf-toed gecko), Sauromalus ater (common chuckwalla), Sceloporus hunsakeri (Hunsaker's spiny lizard), Urosaurus nigricauda (black-tailed brush lizard), and Uta stansburiana (common side-blotched lizard).
