= Isla Las Ánimas =

Island in the Gulf of California

Isla Las Animas
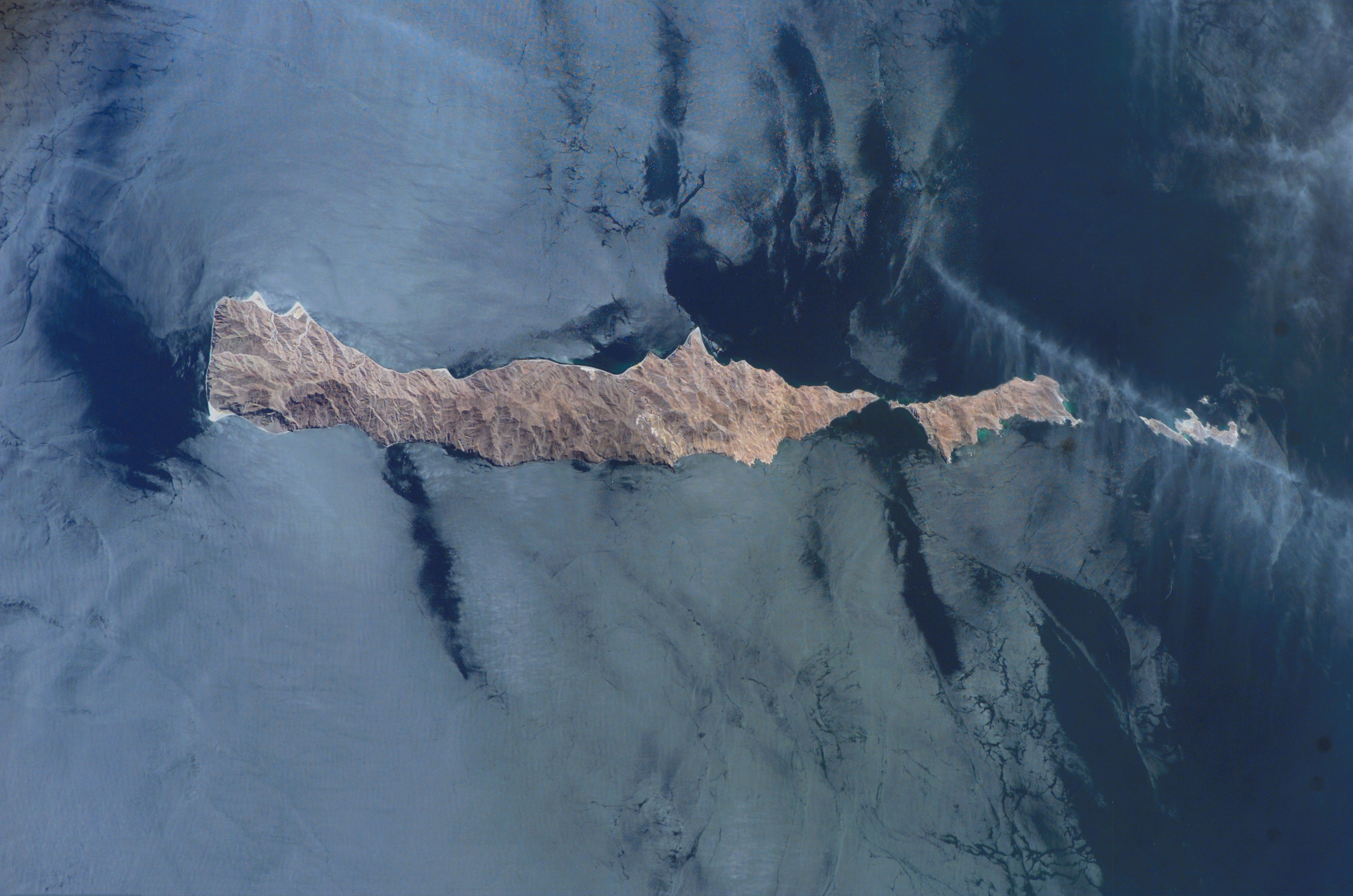
- Isla Las Animas (right)

- Location within Mexico

Geography
- Location: Gulf of California
- Coordinates: 25°05′52.85″N 110°34′24.95″W
- Highest elevation: 20 m (70 ft)

Administration
- Mexico
- State: Baja California Sur

Demographics
- Population: Uninhabited

Isla Las Animas, is a Mexican island in the Gulf of California east of the Baja California Peninsula. The island is uninhabited and is part of the La Paz Municipality.

== Biology ==
Isla Las Animas has two species of reptiles: Phyllodactylus unctus (San Lucan leaf-toed gecko) and Urosaurus nigricauda (black-tailed brush lizard).
