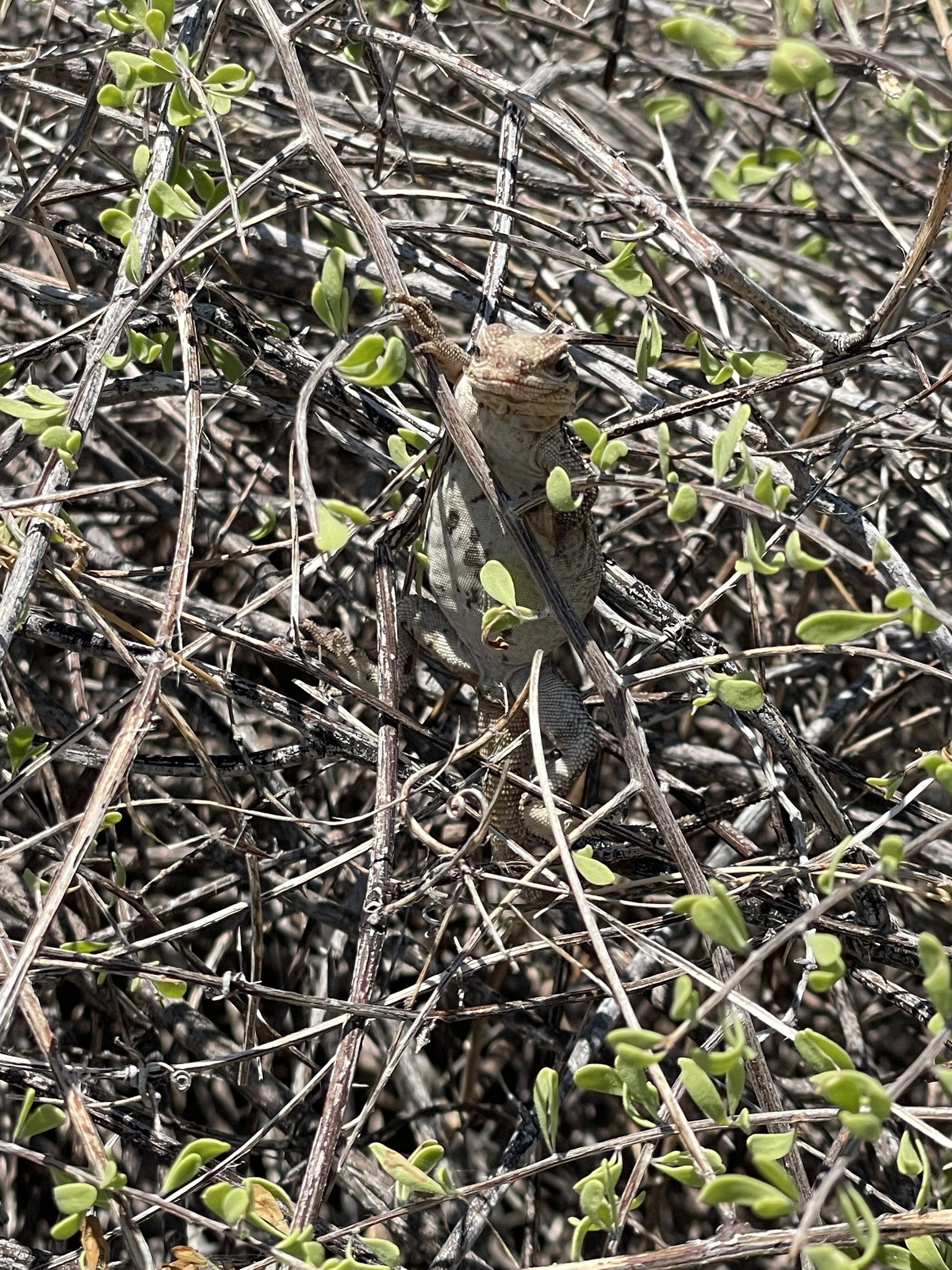

Conservation status
- Near Threatened (IUCN 3.1)

Scientific classification
- Kingdom: Animalia
- Phylum: Chordata
- Class: Reptilia
- Order: Squamata
- Suborder: Iguania
- Family: Iguanidae
- Genus: Sauromalus
- Species: S. slevini

Binomial name
- Sauromalus slevini Van Denburgh, 1922

= Sauromalus slevini =

Sauromalus sleveni

Species of lizard

Sauromalus slevini, also known as the Monserrat chuckwalla or Slevin's chuckwalla, is a species of chuckwalla belonging to the family Iguanidae. S. slevini is native to three small islands in the Sea of Cortés.

== Taxonomy and etymology ==
The generic name, Sauromalus, is said to be a combination of two ancient Greek words: sauros meaning "lizard" and omalus meaning "flat". The proper ancient Greek word for "flat" is however homalos (ὁμαλός) or homalēs (ὁμαλής).

Its specific name, slevini, is a Latinized form of the surname of American zoologist Joseph Richard Slevin (1881–1957), who was Curator of Herpetology at the California Academy of Sciences from 1928 to 1957.

The species was first described by American herpetologist John Van Denburgh in 1922.

The common name, "chuckwalla", derives from the Shoshone word tcaxxwal or Cahuilla caxwal, transcribed by Spaniards as chacahuala.

== Geographic range ==
S. slevini is found on three islands in the Sea of Cortés: Isla del Carmen, Isla Coronados, and Isla Monserrate. It can be found at altitudes from sea level to 489 m (1,604 ft).

== Conservation status ==
Due to its restricted range S. slevinii is a CITES protected animal.

== Description ==
S. slevini has the following coloration. The base color on its back is brown or olive green, with a yellow middorsal band, but can be spotted, marbled, or cross-banded with red or darker brown. The head, tail, and limbs are unicolor, and the tail may be faintly cross-banded with darker brown. The ventral surfaces are dull brown, marbled or spotted with dark brown, especially on the throat.

== Habitat and diet ==
The Montserrat chuckwalla prefers dwelling in lava flows and rocky areas with nooks and crannies available for a retreat when threatened. These areas are typically vegetated by creosote bush and cholla cacti, which form the staple of its diet as the chuckwalla is primarily herbivorous. The chuckwalla also feeds on leaves, fruit and flowers of annuals, perennial plants, and even weeds; insects represent a supplementary prey if eaten at all.

== Reproduction ==
S. slevini is oviparous.
