= Isla San Cosme =

Island in the Gulf of California

- Location within Mexico

Geography
- Location: Gulf of California
- Coordinates: 25°35′9.46″N 111°09′0.97″W
- Highest elevation: 95 m (312 ft)

Administration
- Mexico
- State: Baja California Sur

Demographics
- Population: Uninhabited

Isla San Cosme, is an island in the Gulf of California east of the Baja California Peninsula. The island is uninhabited and is part of the Loreto Municipality.

== Biology ==
Isla San Cosme has three species of reptiles: Aspidoscelis tigris (tiger whiptail), Sauromalus ater (common chuckwalla), and Urosaurus nigricauda (black-tailed brush lizard).
