= Isla Islitas =

- Location within Mexico

Geography
- Location: Gulf of California
- Coordinates: 25°45′25.88″N 111°16′28.91″W
- Highest elevation: 20 m (70 ft)

Administration
- Mexico
- State: Baja California Sur

Demographics
- Population: Uninhabited

Isla Islitas, is an island in the Gulf of California east of the Baja California Peninsula. The island is uninhabited and is part of the Loreto Municipality.

== Biology ==
Isla Islitas has only one species of reptile, Urosaurus nigricauda (black-tailed brush lizard).
