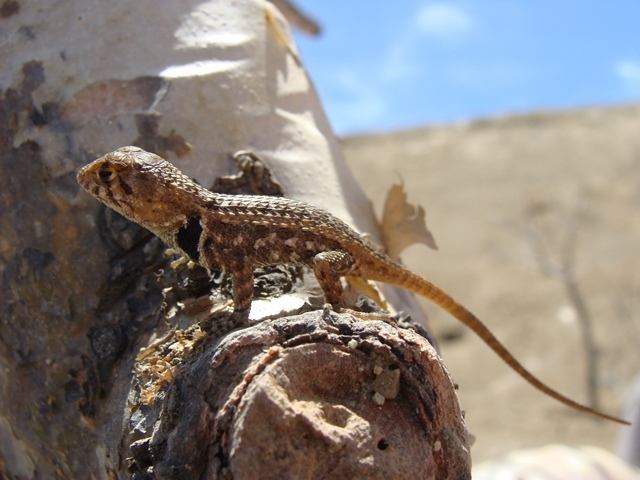

Conservation status
- Least Concern (IUCN 3.1)

Scientific classification
- Domain: Eukaryota
- Kingdom: Animalia
- Phylum: Chordata
- Class: Reptilia
- Order: Squamata
- Suborder: Iguania
- Family: Phrynosomatidae
- Genus: Sceloporus
- Species: S. zosteromus

Binomial name
- Sceloporus zosteromus Cope, 1863

Synonyms
- List: Sceloporus monserratensis Van Denburgh & Slevin, 1921; Sceloporus magister zosteromus Linsdale, 1932; Sceloporus magister monserratensis Smith, 1939; Sceloporus magister rufidorsum Linsdale, 1932; Sceloporus rufidorsum Yarrow, 1882

= Sceloporus zosteromus =

Species of lizard

Sceloporus zosteromus, the central Baja spiny lizard or Monserrat Island spiny lizard, is a species of lizard in the family Phrynosomatidae. It is endemic to Mexico.
