= Isla Tijeras =

Island in the Gulf of California

- Location within Mexico

Geography
- Location: Gulf of California
- Coordinates: 25°44′38.24″N 111°13′36.45″W
- Highest elevation: 60 m (200 ft)

Administration
- Mexico
- State: Baja California Sur

Demographics
- Population: Uninhabited

Isla Tijeras, is an island in the Gulf of California east of the Baja California Peninsula. The island is uninhabited and is part of the Loreto Municipality.

== Biology ==
Isla Tijeras has only one species of reptile, the black-tailed brush lizard (Urosaurus nigricauda).
