= Isla Mosca =

- Location within Mexico

Geography
- Location: Gulf of California
- Coordinates: 26°45′21.56″N 111°53′13.45″W
- Highest elevation: 10 m (30 ft)

Administration
- Mexico
- State: Baja California Sur

Demographics
- Population: Uninhabited

Isla Mosca, is an island in the Gulf of California, located within Bahía Concepción east of the Baja California Peninsula. The island is uninhabited and is part of the Mulegé Municipality.

== Biology ==
Isla Mosca has only one species of reptile, the peninsular leaf-toed gecko (Phyllodactylus nocticolus).
