= Isla Granito =

Island in the Gulf of California

- Location within Baja California Location within Mexico

Geography
- Location: Gulf of California
- Coordinates: 29°33′52.31″N 113°32′22.74″W
- Highest elevation: 50 m (160 ft)

Administration
- Mexico
- State: Baja California

Demographics
- Population: uninhabited

Isla Granito, is an island in the Gulf of California east of the Baja California Peninsula. The island is uninhabited and is part of the Mexicali Municipality.

== Biology ==
Isla Granito has two species of reptile, Sauromalus hispidus (Spiny Chuckwalla) and Uta stansburiana (Common Side-blotched Lizard).
