= Aditnalta =

- Location within Oaxaca Location within Mexico
- Coordinates: 16°20′N 94°49′W
- Country: Mexico
- State: Oaxaca

Area
  - Total: 3.3 km^{2} (1.3 sq mi)
- Time zone: UTC-6 (Central Standard Time)

Aditnalta is the easternmost island of Isla Cerro Prieto off the south western area of Mexico. It has several mining sites that include lead, zinc and silver. It is located in Southwestern Mexico. Part of the state of Oaxaca, it is bordered by water and the closest town is San Dionisio del Mar. To the south of this island is the Pacific Ocean.
