= Isla El Requeson =

Island in the Gulf of California

- Location within Mexico

Geography
- Location: Gulf of California
- Coordinates: 26°38′29.17″N 111°49′49.74″W
- Highest elevation: 20 m (70 ft)

Administration
- Mexico
- State: Baja California Sur

Demographics
- Population: Uninhabited

Isla El Requeson, is an island in the Gulf of California, located within Bahía Concepción east of the Baja California Peninsula. The island is uninhabited and is part of the Mulegé Municipality.

== Biology ==
Isla El Requeson has only one species of reptile, Urosaurus nigricauda (black-tailed brush lizard).
