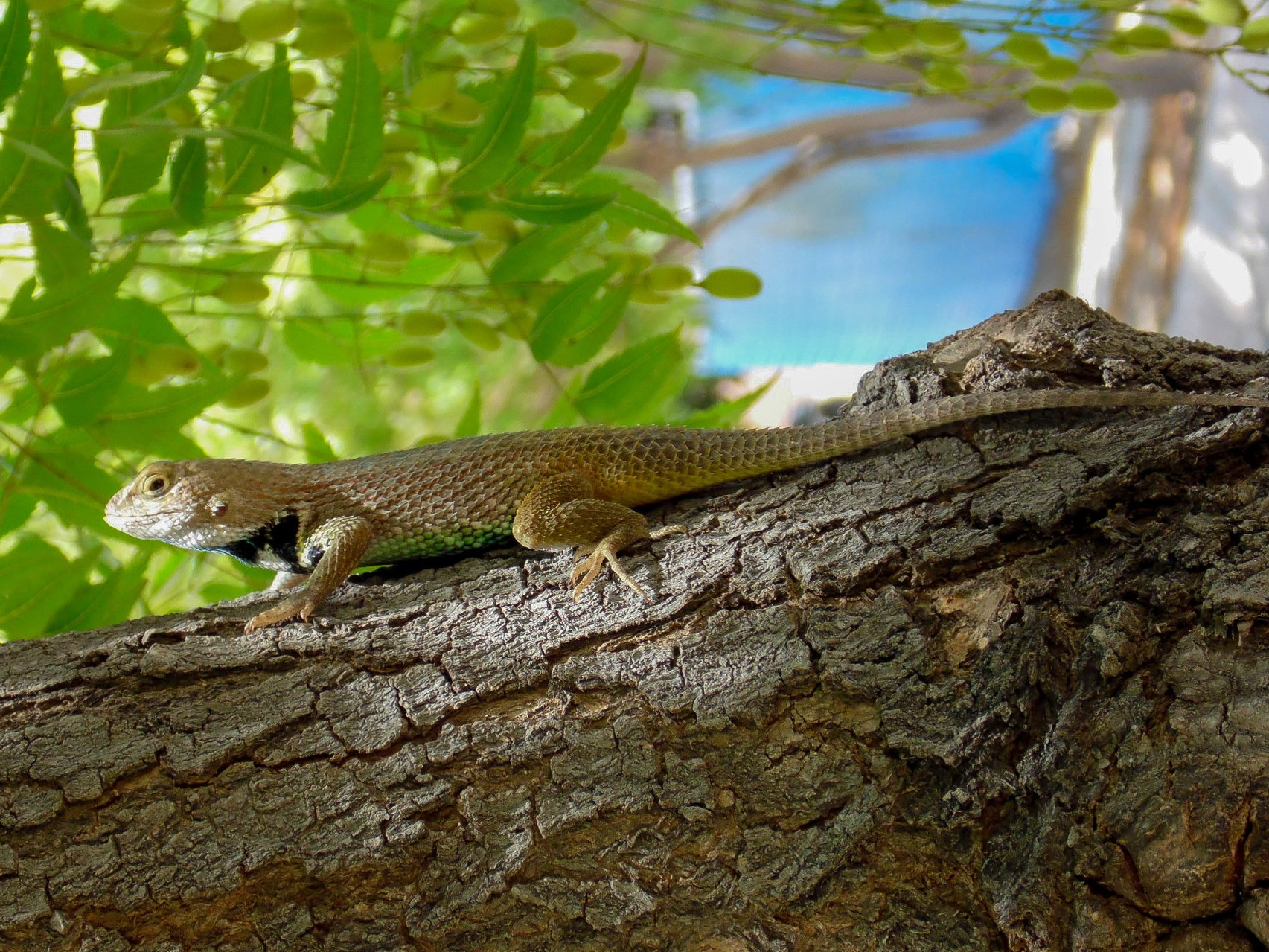

Conservation status
- Least Concern (IUCN 3.1)

Scientific classification
- Kingdom: Animalia
- Phylum: Chordata
- Class: Reptilia
- Order: Squamata
- Suborder: Iguania
- Family: Phrynosomatidae
- Genus: Sceloporus
- Species: S. hunsakeri

Binomial name
- Sceloporus hunsakeri Hall & H.M. Smith, 1979

= Sceloporus hunsakeri =

Species of lizard

Sceloporus hunsakeri, also known commonly as Hunsaker's spiny lizard and la espinosa de Hunsaker in Mexican Spanish, is a species of lizard in the family Phrynosomatidae. The species is endemic to the Mexican state of Baja California Sur.

== Etymology ==
The specific name, hunsakeri, is in honor of American zoologist Don Hunsaker II.

== Habitat ==
The preferred natural habitat of S. hunsakeri is rocky areas in shrubland, but it has also been found around buildings in urban areas.

== Reproduction ==
S. hunsakeri is oviparous.
