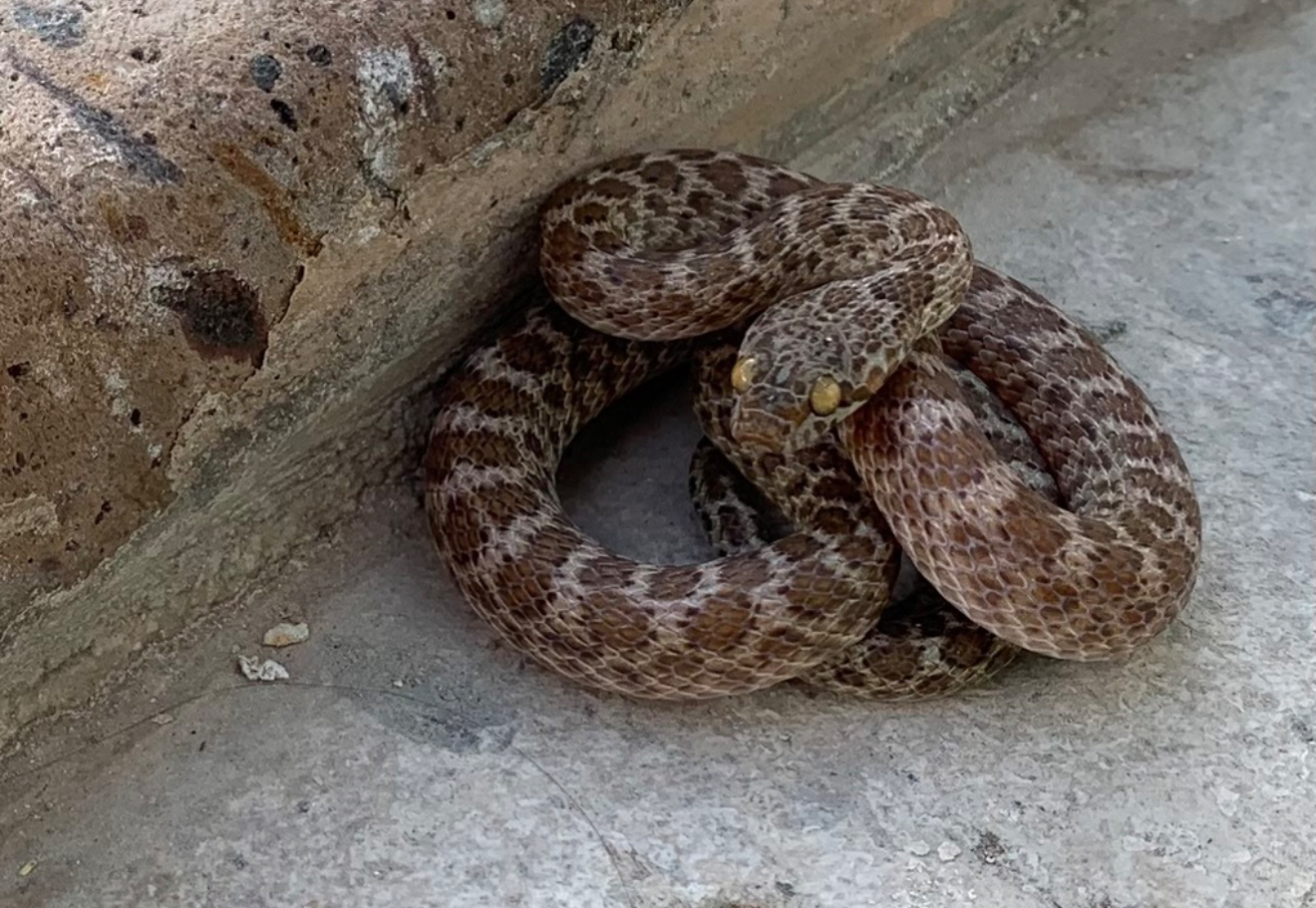

Conservation status
- Least Concern (IUCN 3.1)

Scientific classification
- Kingdom: Animalia
- Phylum: Chordata
- Class: Reptilia
- Order: Squamata
- Suborder: Serpentes
- Family: Colubridae
- Genus: Hypsiglena
- Species: H. slevini

Binomial name
- Hypsiglena slevini Tanner, 1943

= Hypsiglena slevini =

Species of snake

Hypsiglena slevini, the Baja California night snake, is a species of snake in the family Colubridae. The species is native to Mexico.
