= Isla San Francisco =

Island in the Gulf of California

- Location within Mexico

Geography
- Location: Gulf of California
- Coordinates: 24°49′50.90″N 110°34′29.25″W
- Area: 3.78 km^{2} (1.46 sq mi)
- Highest elevation: 194 m (636 ft)

Administration
- Mexico
- State: Baja California Sur

Demographics
- Population: Uninhabited

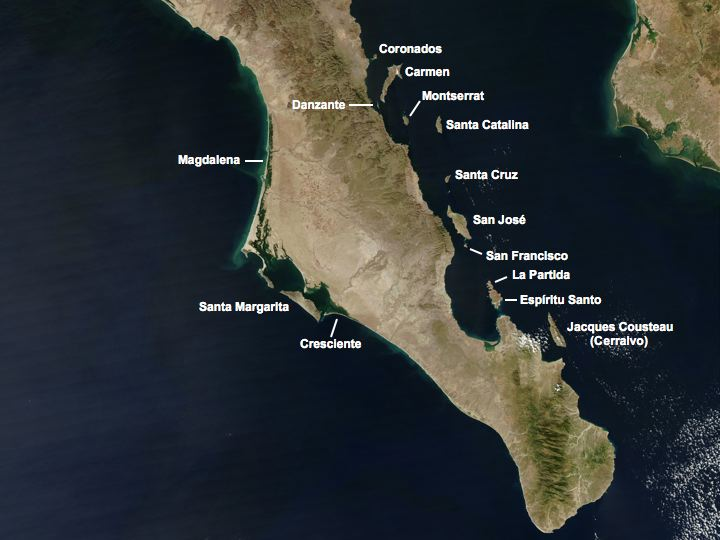
Isla San Francesco

Isla San Francisco is a small island in Mexico located in the Gulf of California off the eastern coast of Baja California Sur, south of Isla San José. Uninhabited, the island is located in the southern portion of the Gulf of California, north of the Bay of La Paz, some 75 km (47 mi) north of the town of La Paz and is part of the La Paz Municipality. It is separated from the peninsula of Baja California by a channel about 10 km (6.2 mi) wide. The island is 2.5 km (1.6 mi) long and 2.5 km (1.6 mi) wide with maximum total area of 3.78 km^{2} (930 acres).

== Biology ==
Isla San Francisco has 10 species of reptiles, including the endemic Isla San Francisco whiptail (Aspidoscelis franciscensis).

== See also ==
- Geography of Mexico
- Geography of North America

== Bibliography ==
- Williams, J.H. (August 1996). Baja Boaters Guide II: Sea of Cortez. H.J. Williams Publications. p. 121. ISBN 0-9616843-8-0.
