= Islotes Las Galeras =

Islands in the Gulf of California

- Location within Mexico

Geography
- Location: Gulf of California
- Coordinates: 25°44′27.75″N 111°02′39.23″W
- Highest elevation: 50 m (160 ft)

Administration
- Mexico
- State: Baja California Sur

Demographics
- Population: Uninhabited

Islotes Las Galeras, are a pair of small islands in the Gulf of California east of the Baja California Peninsula, and just 3/4 miles (about 1 km) north of Isla Monserrate. The islands are uninhabited and part of the Loreto Municipality.

== Biology ==
Islotes Las Galeras has only one species of reptile, Uta stansburiana (common side-blotched lizard).
