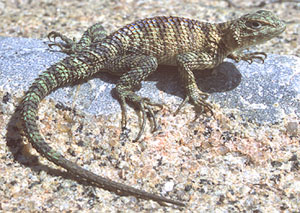
- Sceloporus orcutti

Conservation status
- Least Concern (IUCN 3.1)

Scientific classification
- Kingdom: Animalia
- Phylum: Chordata
- Class: Reptilia
- Order: Squamata
- Suborder: Iguania
- Family: Phrynosomatidae
- Genus: Sceloporus
- Species: S. orcutti

Binomial name
- Sceloporus orcutti Stejneger, 1893

= Granite spiny lizard =

Species of lizard

The granite spiny lizard (Sceloporus orcutti), also known commonly as la espinosa del granito in Mexican Spanish, is a species of lizard in the family Phrynosomatidae. The species is native to the southwestern United States and adjacent northwestern Mexico. There are no subspecies.

== Etymology ==
The epithet, orcutti, honors American naturalist Charles Russell Orcutt (1864–1929), who collected the type specimen in San Diego County, California.

== Geographic distribution ==
Sceloporus orcutti is native to extreme southern California in the United States and Baja California in Mexico.

== Description ==
The granite spiny lizard usually has a snout-to-vent length (SVL) of 7.6–10.8 cm (3.0–4.3 in). The maximum recorded total length (tail included) is 28.9 cm (11.4 in). The dorsal scales are strongly keeled and pointed on both the body and the tail. It has a wide purple mid-dorsal stripe. The male of the species has yellow-green and blue-centered scales on the body; the female and juveniles have distinct yellow-tan transverse bands on the body and tail. Additionally, the male has deep-blue ventral patches on its chest and throat, and it has femoral pores.

== Behavior and habitat ==
The granite spiny lizard is a colorful species that can be observed perched atop boulders from considerable distance. This species is primarily associated with rocky hillsides and outcrops.

== Reproduction ==
Sceloporus orcutti is oviparous.

== Source ==
- This article is based on a description from "A Field Guide to the Reptiles and Amphibians of Coastal Southern California", Robert N. Fisher and Ted J. Case, United States Geological Survey, https://www.werc.usgs.gov/fieldguide/index.htm.
