= Huivulai =

Island off the coast of Sonora, Mexico

Coordinates: 27.062°N 109.977°W

Isla Huivulai (lit. 'long neck' in the Mayo language) is an island located 5 km (3 mi) off the coast of the Mexican state of Sonora, in the Gulf of California.

The island is part of the municipality of Cajeme, Sonora and is located 45 km (28 mi) south of Ciudad Obregón. The island is 14 km (9 mi) long and 0.5 km (0.3 mi) wide. Attractions of the island include its sandy beach, artesian well, and high dunes.

The Mexican western movie Todo por nada was filmed on the island in 1968.

== Fauna ==
The fresh water artesian well is 97 m (318 ft) deep, creating an oasis of date-producing palm trees where birds such as fulvous whistling duck, grey pelicans and American white pelicans live as well as grey herons, cranes and albatross. Other species of birds on the island include turnstones, spoonbills, skimmers, waders, and other shorebirds, gulls, terns, frigatebirds, and boobies.

In Tobari Bay, tourists fish for mullets, sea bass, and two species of the genus Epinephelus.
