= Isla Santiago (Baja California Sur) =

Island in the Gulf of California

- Location within Mexico

Geography
- Location: Gulf of California, Loreto Municipality
- Coordinates: 26°06′20.53″N 111°18′19.25″W
- Highest elevation: 20 m (70 ft)

Administration
- Mexico
- State: Baja California Sur

Demographics
- Population: Uninhabited

Isla Santiago, is an island in the Gulf of California, east of the Baja California Peninsula in Baja California Sur state.

The uninhabited island is within Loreto Municipality.

== Biology ==
Isla Santiago has only one species of reptile, the desert iguana (Dipsosaurus dorsalis).
