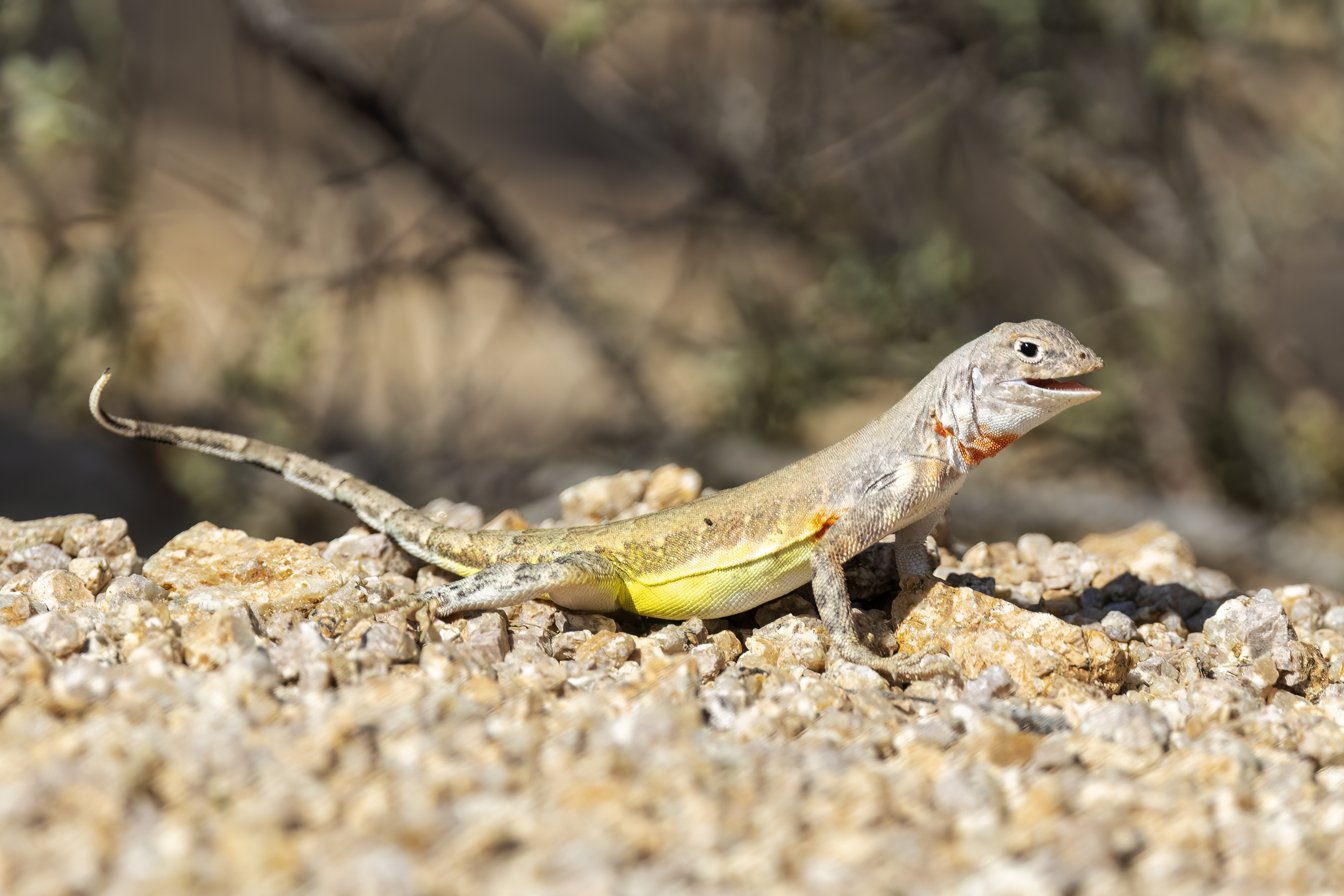
- Female
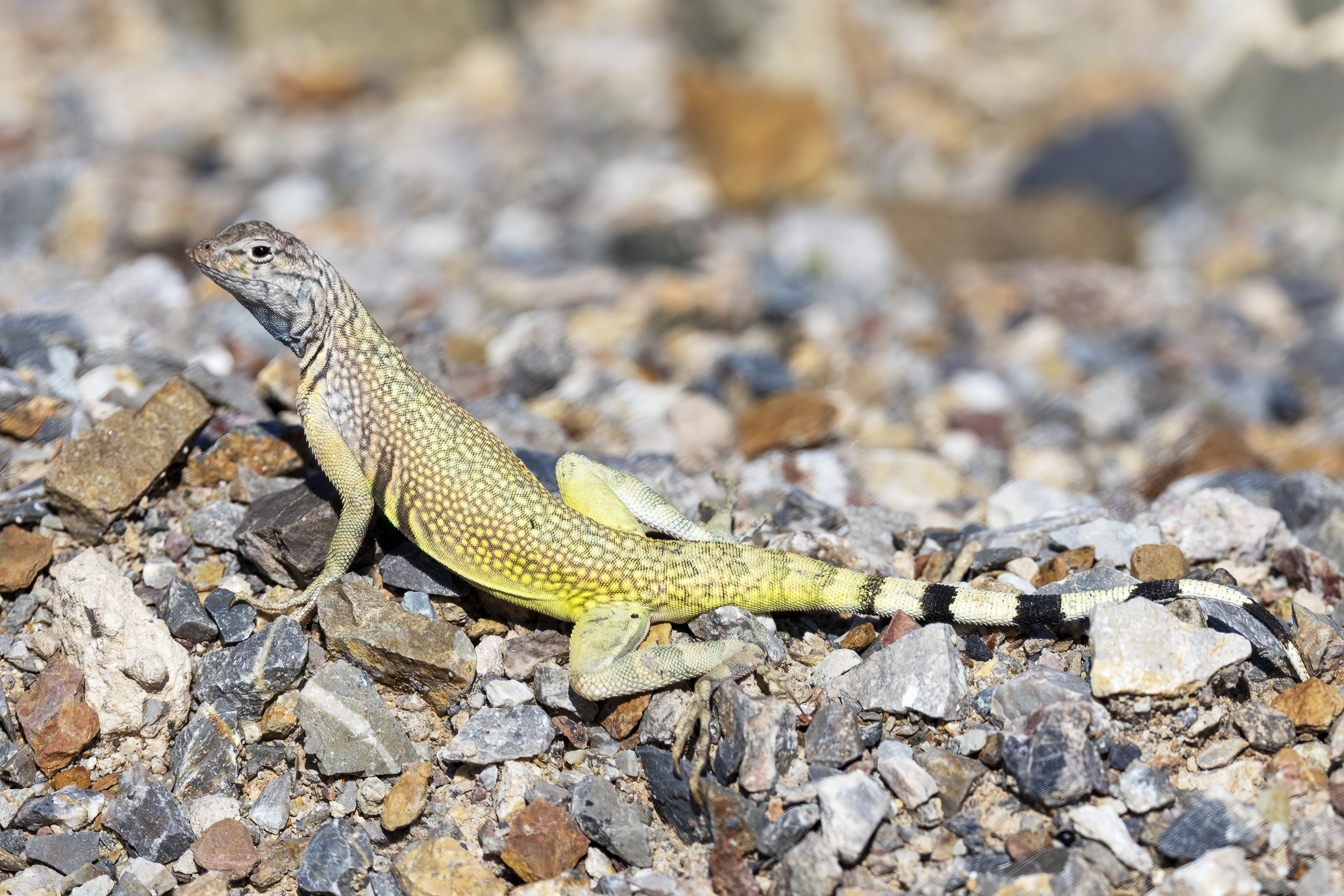
- Male

Conservation status
- Least Concern (IUCN 3.1)

Scientific classification
- Kingdom: Animalia
- Phylum: Chordata
- Class: Reptilia
- Order: Squamata
- Suborder: Iguania
- Family: Phrynosomatidae
- Genus: Callisaurus; Blainville, 1835
- Species: C. draconoides

Binomial name
- Callisaurus draconoides Blainville, 1835
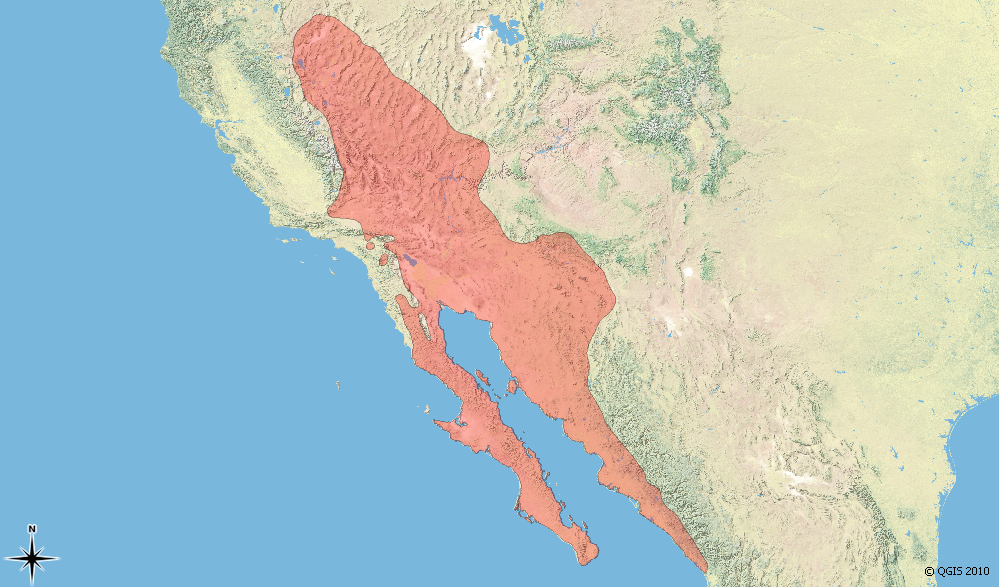

= Zebra-tailed lizard =

Callisaurus draconoides

Species of lizard

The zebra-tailed lizard (Callisaurus draconoides) is a species of lizard in the family Phrynosomatidae. The species is native to the Southwestern United States and adjacent northwestern Mexico. There are nine recognized subspecies.

== Habitat ==
Zebra-tailed lizards live in open desert with hard-packed soil, scattered vegetation, and scattered rocks, typically flats, washes, and plains.

== Description ==
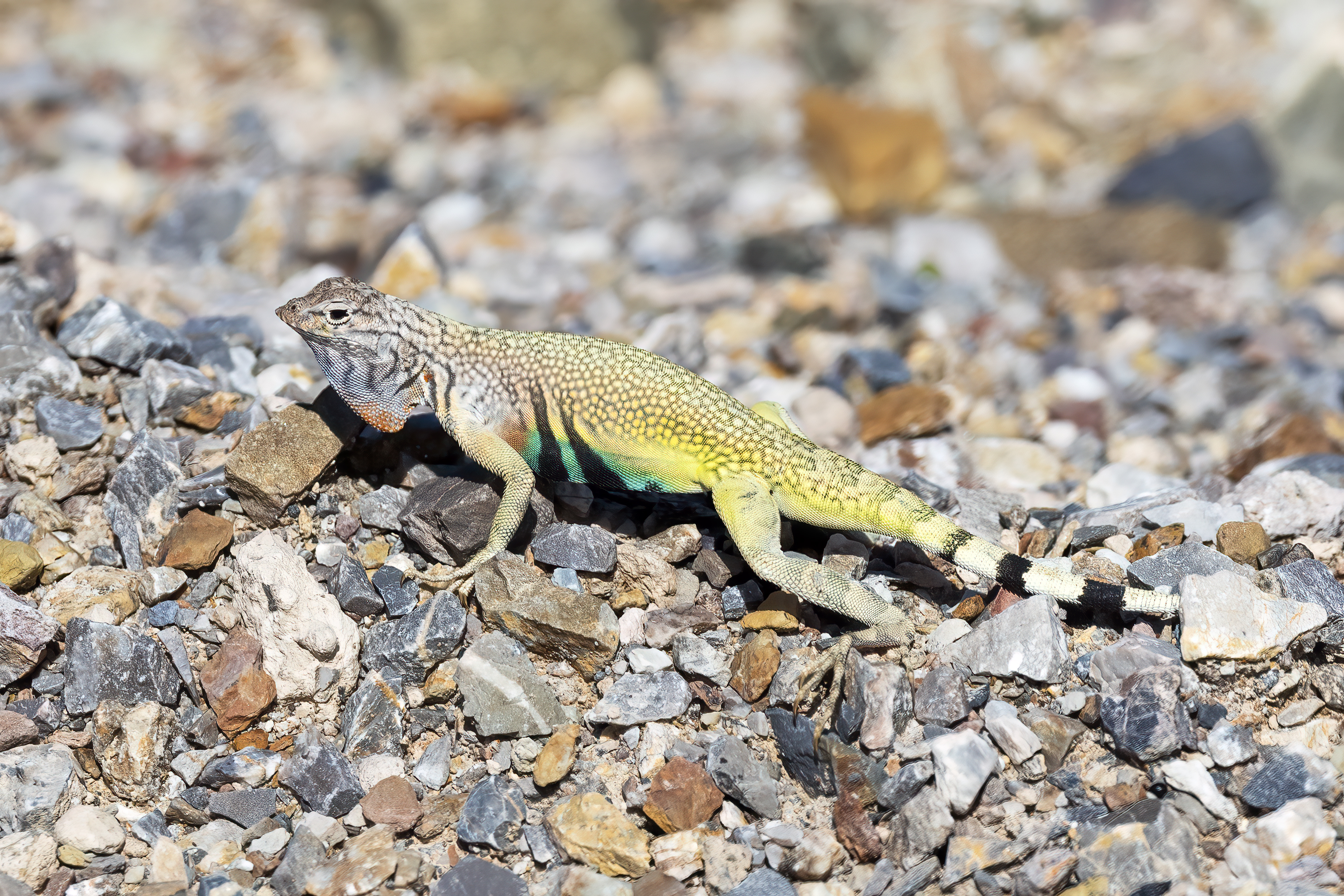
A male zebra-tailed lizard with side stripes, blue underbelly, and extended dewlap.

Zebra-tailed lizards range in size from 2.5 to 4 inches (64 to 102 mm) in snout-to-vent length (SVL). These lizards are grey to sandy brown, usually with a series of paired dark gray spots down the back, becoming black crossbands on the tail. The underside of the tail is white with black crossbars. Males have a pair of black blotches on their sides, extending to blue patches on their bellies. Females have no blue patches, and the black bars are either faint or completely absent.

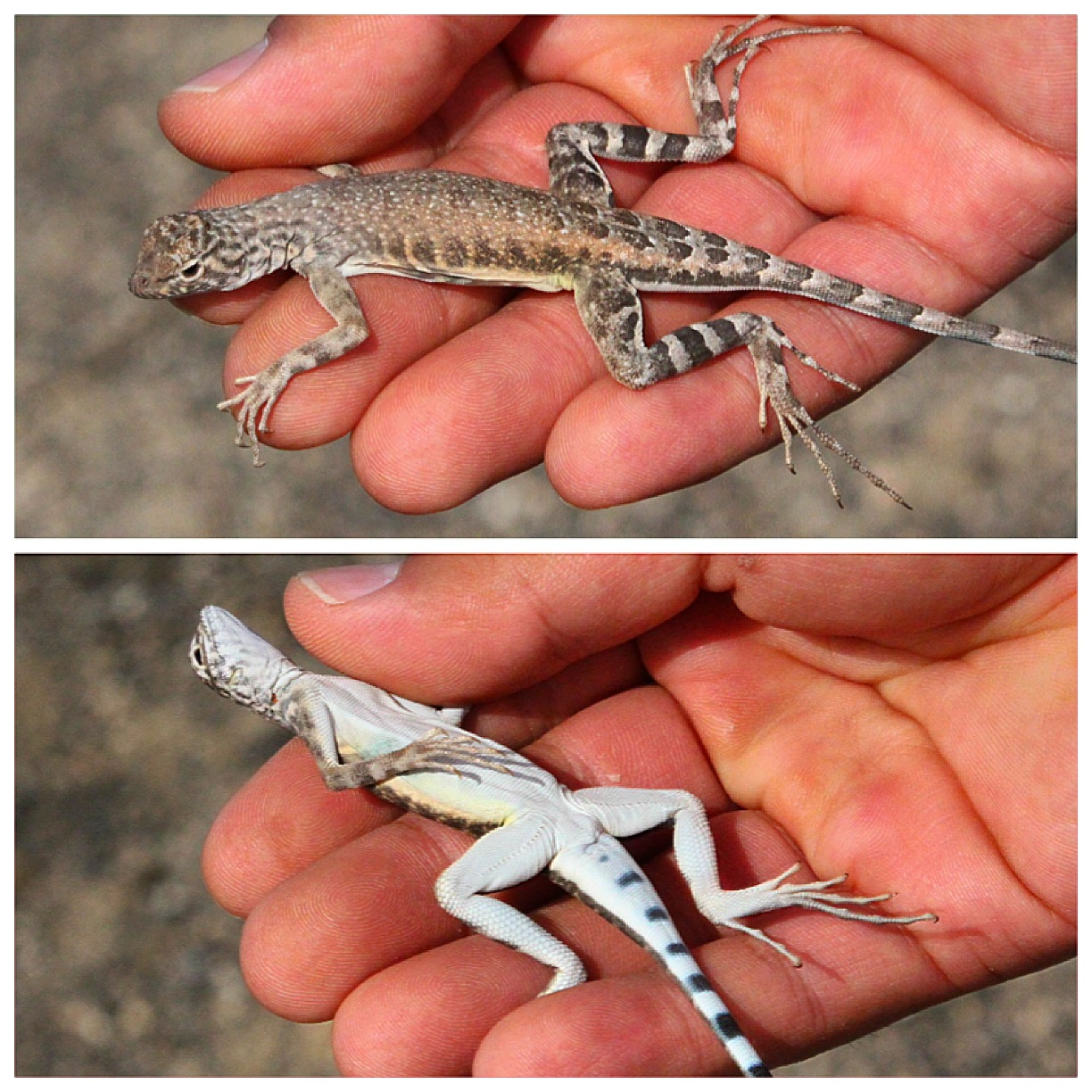
Callisaurus draconoides: Dorsal (top) and ventral (bottom) views

== Behavior ==
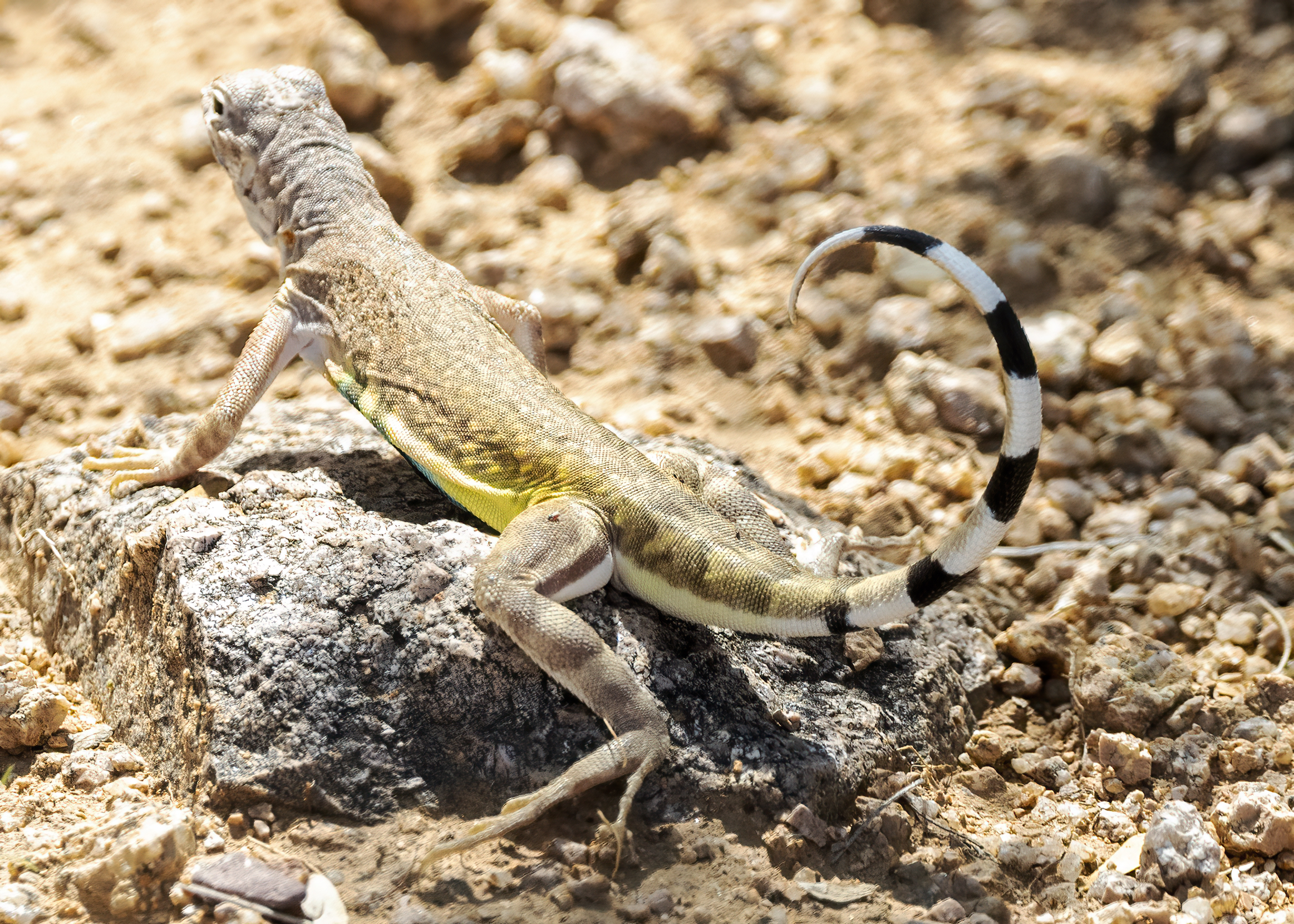
The characteristically curled tail of the zebra-tailed lizard

Zebra-tailed lizards are diurnal and alert. They rise early and are active in all but the hottest weather. During the hottest times of day, lizards may stand alternately on two legs, switching to the opposite two as needed in a kind of dance. When threatened, they run swiftly with their toes curled up and tails raised over their backs, exposing the stripes. When stopped, they wag their curled tails side-to-side to distract predators. They can even run on their hind legs for short distances. In areas of creosote scrub, this lizard reaches its highest population densities, around 4.8 to 6.0 individuals per acre (600 to 800 m^{2} per lizard). This lizard burrows into fine sandy soil for retreat at night and usually seeks day shelter in the shade of bushes. It is also known to burrow under sand for safety when being chased by predators.

== Reproduction ==
In summer, zebra-tailed lizards typically lay two to eight eggs, which hatch from July to November, but more than one clutch can be laid during a season. Eggs are laid, presumably, in friable, sandy soil. Being a prey species for many animals, including birds, other lizards, and mammals, they have a fairly high reproductive rate.

== Diet ==
Lizards of the genus Callisaurus feed on a variety of prey, from insects, such as moths, ants and bees, to spiders and other smaller lizards. The diet occasionally includes vegetation, such as spring buds and flowers.

== Geographic range ==
Zebra-tailed lizards are common and widely distributed throughout the Southwestern United States, ranging from the Mojave and Colorado deserts north into the southern Great Basin.

== Taxonomy ==
The genus Callisaurus is monotypic, containing only one species, C. draconoides. Nine subspecies are recognized, including the nominotypical subspecies.

- C. d. bogerti Martín del Campo, 1943 – Bogert's zebra-tailed lizard
- C. d. brevipes Bogert & Dorson, 1942 – short-footed zebra-tailed lizard
- C. d. carmenensis Dickerson, 1919 – Carmen Island zebra-tailed lizard
- C. d. crinitus Cope, 1896 – Viscaino zebra-tailed lizard
- C. d. draconoides Blainville, 1835 – common zebra-tailed lizard
- C. d. inusitanus Dickerson, 1919 – Sonoran zebra-tailed lizard
- C. d. myurus Richardson, 1915 – Nevada zebra-tailed lizard
- C. d. rhodostictus Cope, 1896 – Mojave zebra-tailed lizard
- C. d. ventralis (Hallowell, 1852) – eastern zebra-tailed lizard

Nota bene: A trinomial authority in parentheses indicates that the subspecies was originally described in a genus other than Callisaurus.

== Etymology ==
The subspecific name, bogerti, is in honor of American herpetologist Charles Mitchill Bogert.
