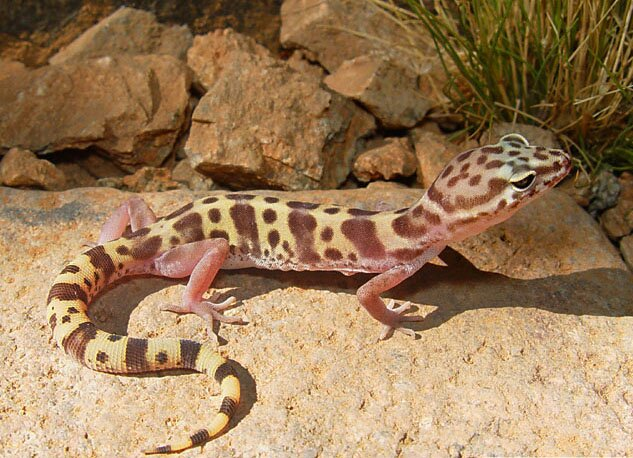

Conservation status
- Least Concern (IUCN 3.1)

Scientific classification
- Kingdom: Animalia
- Phylum: Chordata
- Class: Reptilia
- Order: Squamata
- Suborder: Gekkota
- Family: Eublepharidae
- Genus: Coleonyx
- Species: C. variegatus

Binomial name
- Coleonyx variegatus (Baird, 1858)

Synonyms
- Stenodactylus variegatus Baird, 1858; Coleonyx variegatus — Cope, 1867; Eublepharis variegatus — Boulenger, 1885; Coleonyx variegatus — Stejneger & Barbour, 1917

= Western banded gecko =

Species of lizard

The western banded gecko (Coleonyx variegatus) is a species of lizard in the family Eublepharidae. The species is native to the southwestern United States and adjacent northwestern Mexico. Five subspecies are recognized.

== Geographic range ==
In the United States, C. variegatus is found in Arizona, southern California, southwestern New Mexico, Nevada, and Utah. In California, it is found in the Mojave and Sonoran deserts In Mexico, it is found in northwestern Baja California and Sonora.

== Subspecies ==
Five subspecies of C. variegatus are recognized as being valid, including the nominotypical subspecies.

- Coleonyx variegatus abbotti Klauber, 1945 – San Diego banded gecko
- Coleonyx variegatus bogerti Klauber, 1945 – Tucson banded gecko
- Coleonyx variegatus sonoriensis Klauber, 1945 – Sonoran banded gecko
- Coleonyx variegatus utahensis Klauber, 1945 – Utah banded gecko
- Coleonyx variegatus variegatus (Baird, 1858) – desert banded gecko

Nota bene: A trinomial authority in parentheses indicates that the subspecies was originally described in a genus other than Coleonyx.

== Description ==
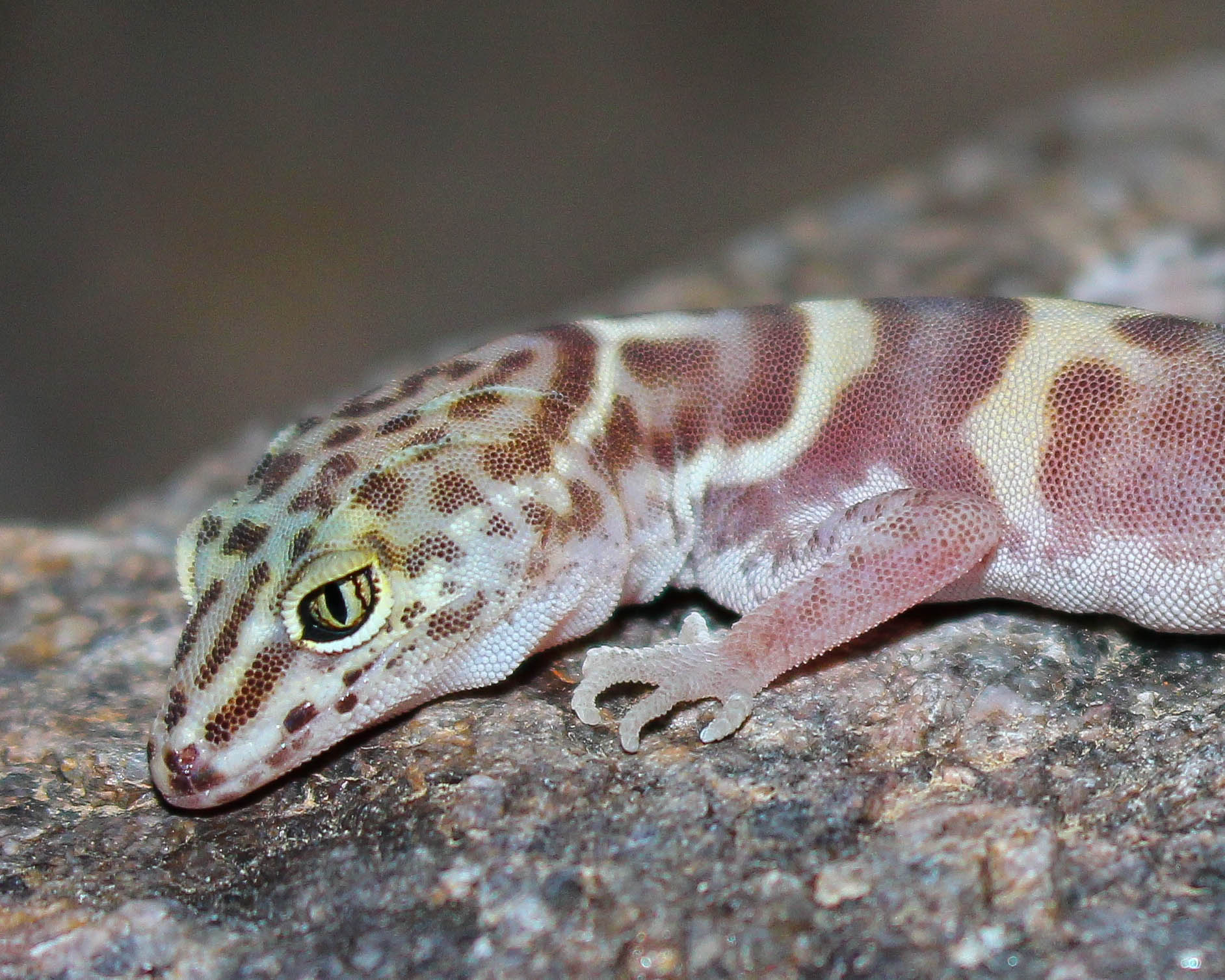
The western banded gecko (Coleonyx variegatus), San Bernardino County, CA.

The western banded gecko is a terrestrial lizard, ranging in total length (including tail) from 4–6 inches (10–15 cm). The body of the western banded gecko (excluding the tail) rarely grows past 3 inches in length. Hatchlings measure 1 inch (2.5 cm). The body is sandy-colored with dark crossbands broken into patches. The tiny scales give its skin a silky texture. Unlike typical geckos, it has prominent eyes with movable lids. The male reptiles of this species have noticeable spurs on both sides of the body located at the base of the tail.

== Habitat ==
The western banded gecko is found in a wide range of habitats, including creosote bush and sagebrush desert, pinyon-juniper woodland, and catclaw-cedar-grama grass associations in the eastern part of its range and chaparral areas in the west. Its elevational range extends from below sea level to about 1,520 m (4,990 ft) asl. The species commonly lives in open and arid deserts and grasslands.

The substrate in which the species lives ranges from rocky and sheltered areas to sandy dunes and arroyos.

== Behavior ==
The western banded gecko is secretive and nocturnal, with individuals remaining hidden during the day and emerging after sunset to forage for food. It feeds on a diversity of invertebrates.

When threatened by predators or other dangers, these geckos may exude a squeak or chirp.

San Diego State University research of 2022 has revealed further insight into the feeding behaviors of the species. The lizards use very fast and precise movements, shaking their heads from side to side, in order to immobilize scorpions caught in their mouths. Researchers believe that this may be done in order to prevent the scorpions from injecting them with their venom.

C. variegatus preys on small insects and spiders, and is one of the few reptiles that control scorpion populations by eating baby scorpions. Individuals prefer warm nights around 80°F, and they can often be seen near human habitations looking to make an easy meal of the insects attracted to landscape or porch lighting.

C. variegatus is preyed upon by many species including coyotes, foxes, snakes, larger lizards, and even large invertebrates such as tarantulas and solpugids. If captured, C. variegatus may squeak and may discard its tail in an attempt to distract the predator and escape. To deter predation, it can also curl its tails over its body to mimic a scorpion.

== Reproduction ==
The Western banded geckos breed during the months April and May. During the months of May through September, the female western banded geckos will lay one to three clutches of eggs. Each clutch of eggs contains two eggs. The eggs will then hatch in approximately 45 days.

== Etymologies ==
The subspecific name, abbotti, is in honor of American ornithologist Clinton Gilbert Abbott.

The subspecific name, bogerti, is in honor of American herpetologist Charles Mitchill Bogert.
