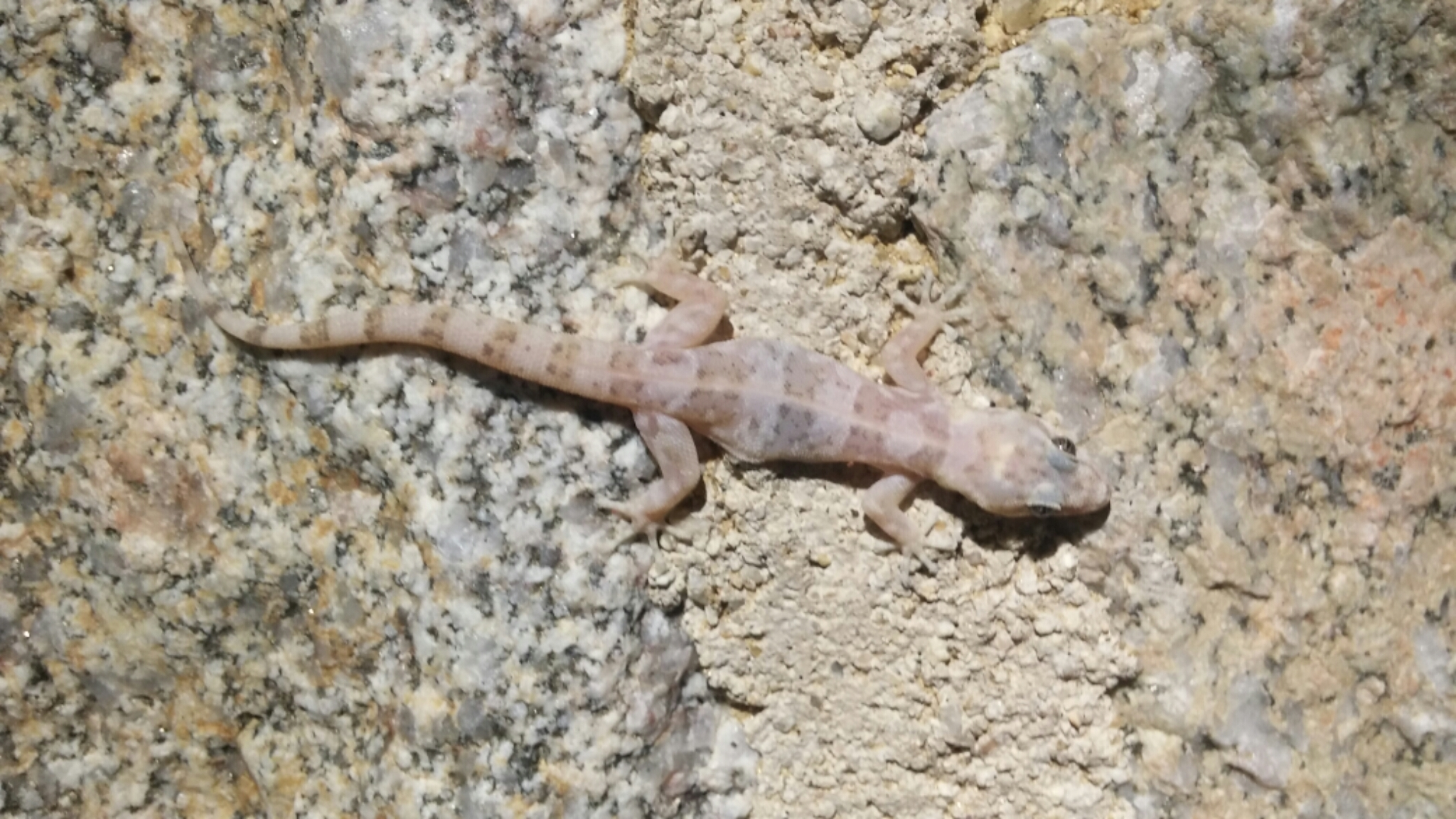

Conservation status
- Near Threatened (IUCN 3.1)

Scientific classification
- Kingdom: Animalia
- Phylum: Chordata
- Class: Reptilia
- Order: Squamata
- Suborder: Gekkota
- Family: Phyllodactylidae
- Genus: Phyllodactylus
- Species: P. unctus

Binomial name
- Phyllodactylus unctus Cope, 1864

= San Lucan gecko =

Species of lizard

The San Lucan gecko (Phyllodactylus unctus) is a species of gecko. It is endemic to Mexico.
