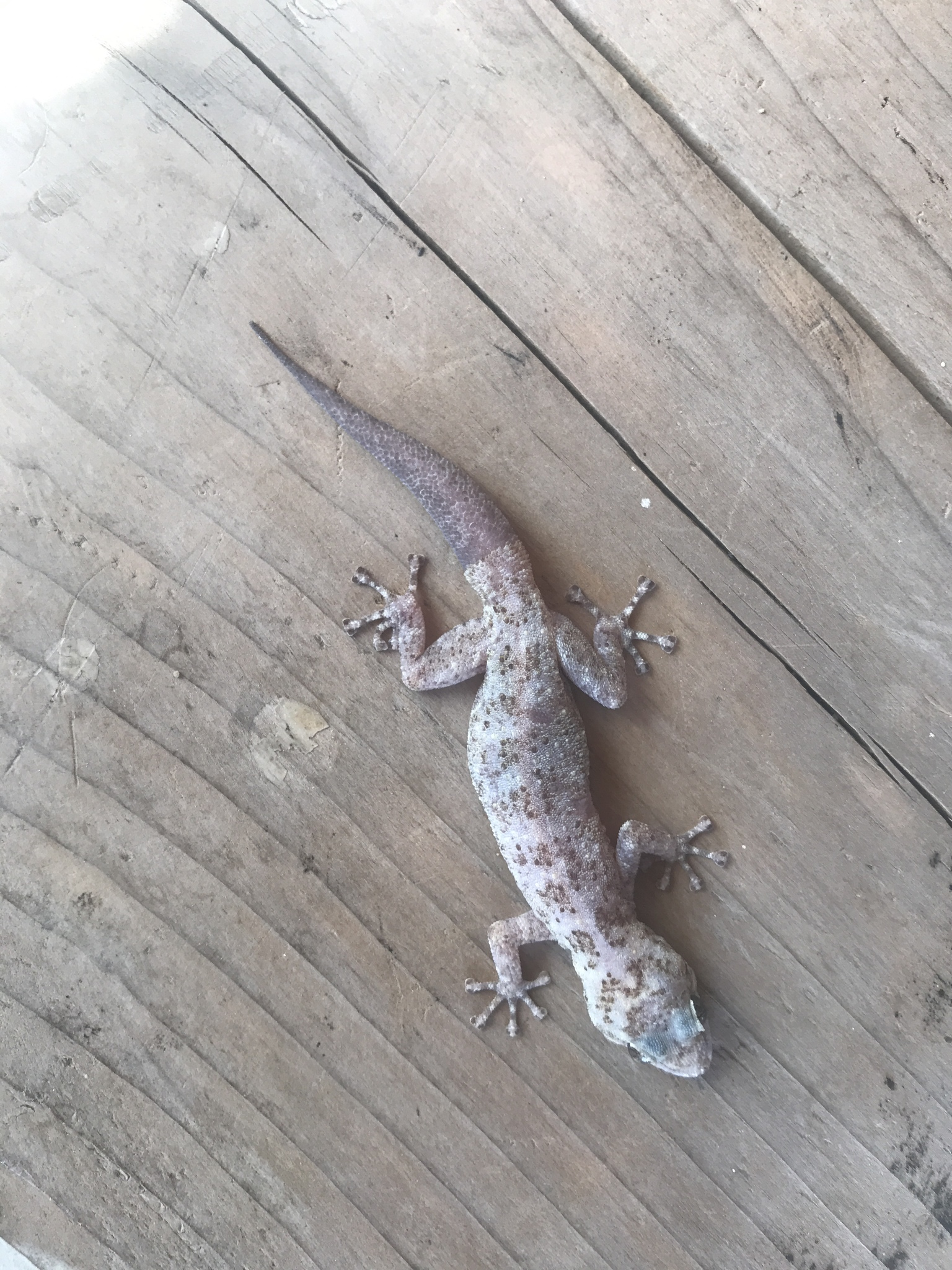

Conservation status
- Least Concern (IUCN 3.1)

Scientific classification
- Kingdom: Animalia
- Phylum: Chordata
- Class: Reptilia
- Order: Squamata
- Suborder: Gekkota
- Family: Phyllodactylidae
- Genus: Phyllodactylus
- Species: P. nocticolus

Binomial name
- Phyllodactylus nocticolus Dixon, 1964

Synonyms
- Phyllodactylus xanti nocticolus Dixon, 1964

= Peninsula leaf-toed gecko =

Species of lizard

The peninsula leaf-toed gecko (Phyllodactylus nocticolus) is a medium-sized gecko. It is found in southern California (USA) and the Baja California Peninsula (Mexico), including many islands in Gulf of California as well as Islas Magdalena and Santa Margarita off the west coast of Baja California Sur.

== Habitat ==
The peninsula leaf-toed gecko occurs in areas of desert shrubs and large open rocks. When looking at their range we can see that they live only in a small part of California. They have been found in abundance starting at the border, continuing through Anza-Borrego Desert State park and stopping just north of Palm Springs. Although they only inhabit a small part of California they are found all throughout Baja California along the peninsula. They live among desert chaparral and can be found in little crevices or on large bare rocks.

== Behavior ==
The peninsula leaf-toed gecko is nocturnal so it is most commonly found at night. They are often found out and about on rocks during the night and during day they can be found underneath rock slabs or in crevices. Although it's not common, they are occasionally found underneath plant substance. They stalk and eat small invertebrates including moths, spiders and more. They have been seen mostly feeding from rocks but have also been spotted hunting along the ground and around plants.

== Conservation status ==
This species is not listed as an endangered species within California. This is likely due to the fact that they are found in areas where there is little to no human activity. Once humans start to slowly build and live within their environment then they may not thrive as well.

== Bibliography ==
"Peninsula Leaf-toed Gecko - Phyllodactylus nocticolus". californiaherps.com. Retrieved 2022-10-13.

-This is an article taken from a website that is the guideline to Amphibians and Reptiles of California, so it should be a reliable source for information on a species of geckos.

"Peninsular Leaf-toed Gecko". GeckoWeb. Retrieved 2022-10-13.

-This is an article taken from a website that is an electronic field guide to geckos, so it should be a reliable source for information on a species of geckos.
