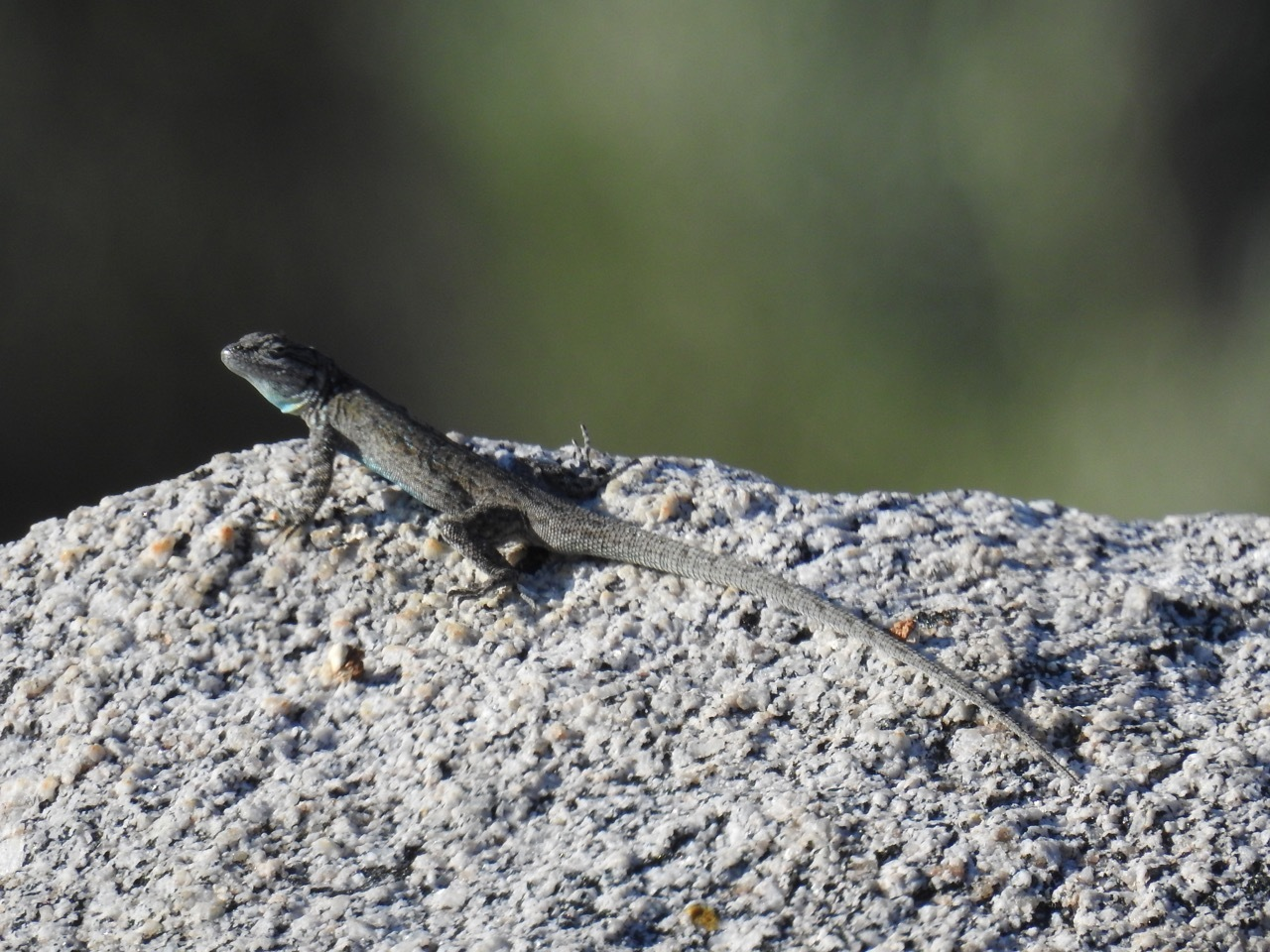

Conservation status
- Least Concern (IUCN 3.1)

Scientific classification
- Kingdom: Animalia
- Phylum: Chordata
- Class: Reptilia
- Order: Squamata
- Suborder: Iguania
- Family: Phrynosomatidae
- Genus: Urosaurus
- Species: U. nigricauda

Binomial name
- Urosaurus nigricauda (Cope, 1864)

Synonyms
- Uta nigricaudus Cope, 1864; Urosaurus microscutatus Mittelman, 1942

= Urosaurus nigricauda =

Baja California Brush Lizard

Species of lizard

Urosaurus nigricauda is a species of lizard. Common names for this species include the Baja California brush lizard, black-tailed brush lizard, and small-scaled tree lizard. Its range includes southern California, Baja California, and nearby Pacific islands.

== Taxonomy ==
Until 1999, the small-scaled lizard, Urosaurus microscutata, was considered a discrete species. U. microscutata has since been identified as the same species, and a synonym of U. nigricauda.
