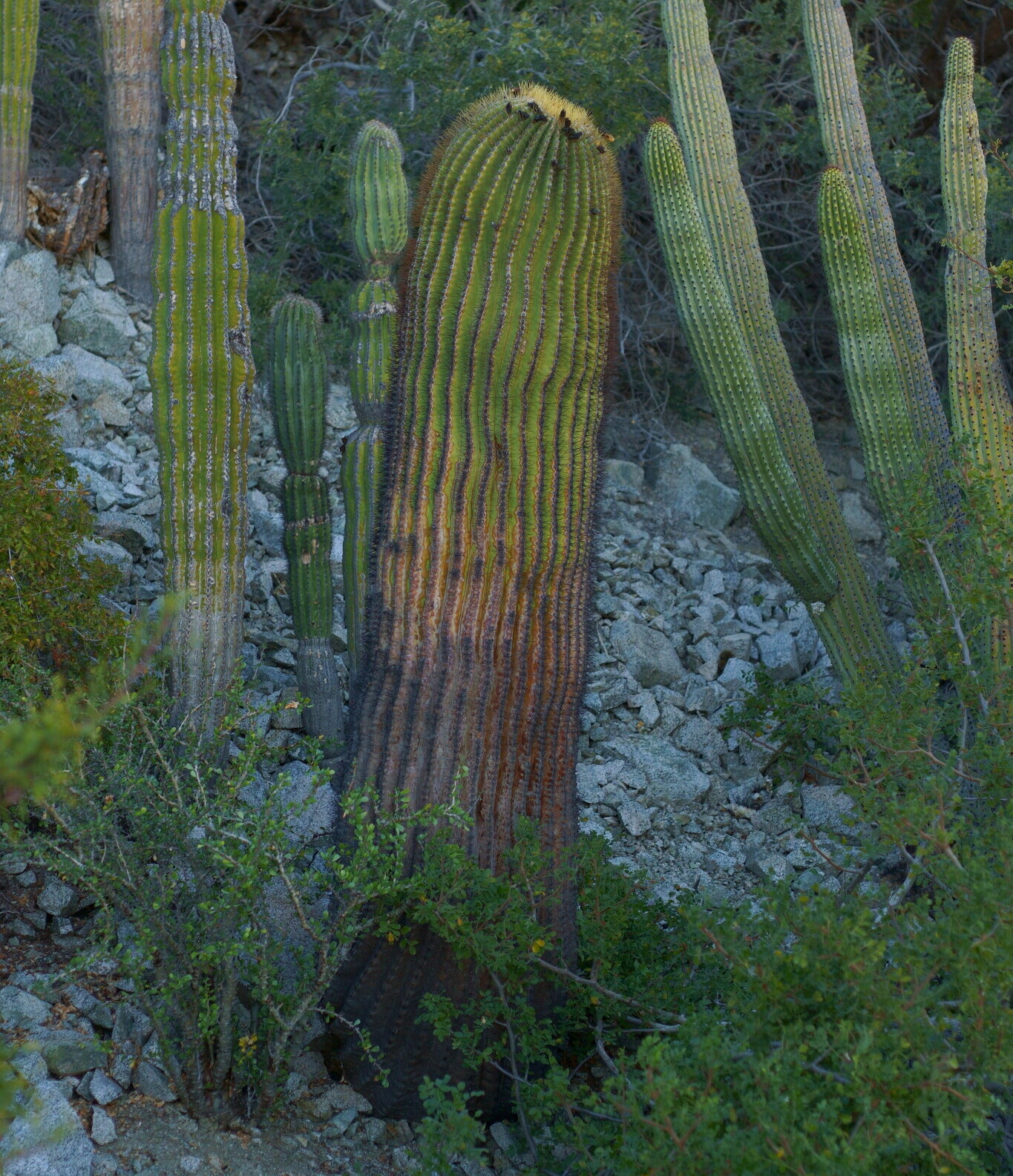
- Ferocactus diguetii on Isla Cerralvo

Conservation status
- Least Concern (IUCN 3.1)

Scientific classification
- Kingdom: Plantae
- Clade: Tracheophytes
- Clade: Angiosperms
- Clade: Eudicots
- Order: Caryophyllales
- Family: Cactaceae
- Subfamily: Cactoideae
- Genus: Ferocactus
- Species: F. diguetii

Binomial name
- Ferocactus diguetii (F.A.C. Weber) Britton & Rose

Synonyms
- Echinocactus diguetii F.A.C. Weber

= Ferocactus diguetii =

Tallest species of barrel cactus

Ferocactus diguetii, commonly known as the giant barrel cactus, is the largest species of barrel cactus in the genus Ferocactus. It is an insular species endemic to several of Baja California Sur's southern islands in the Gulf of California. As the superlative giant of the barrel cacti, it reaches heights of up to 4 metres (13 ft) and diameters of 1 metre (3.3 ft) in the wild, a result of island gigantism. The species has red flowers that bloom from March to May. Although restricted in range, this species grows in protected habitat and lacks major threats.

== Description ==
Ferocactus diguetii is the largest barrel cactus in the genus Ferocactus, with massive, solitary, columnar stems reaching up to 4 metres (13 ft) and diameters of 1 metre (3.3 ft). It is usually about 1–2 m (3.3–6.6 ft) tall and 60–80 cm (2.0–2.6 ft) in diameter. It has numerous thin ribs, 25 to 35, and has up to 8 radial spines per areole, with usually no central spines. The spines are yellow or rarely red, and are up to 4 centimetres (1.6 in), with a slight curve.

The flowers appear from March to May, and are a fiery red to orange in color, measuring 3–4 cm (1.2–1.6 in) in length and diameter. The barrel-shaped fruits reach similar sizes and are lemon yellow with crescent-shaped scales.

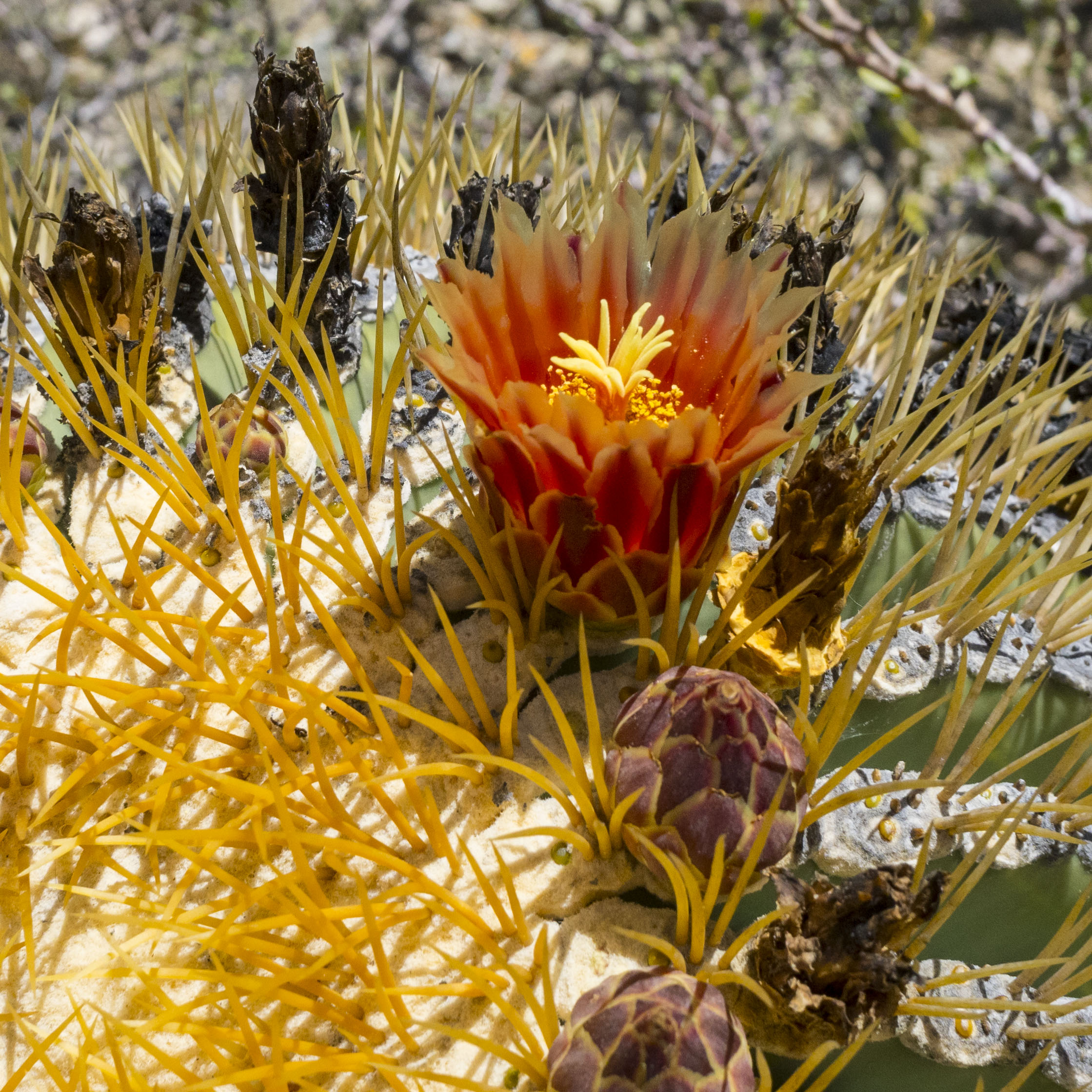
The flower of Ferocactus diguetii on Isla Cerralvo

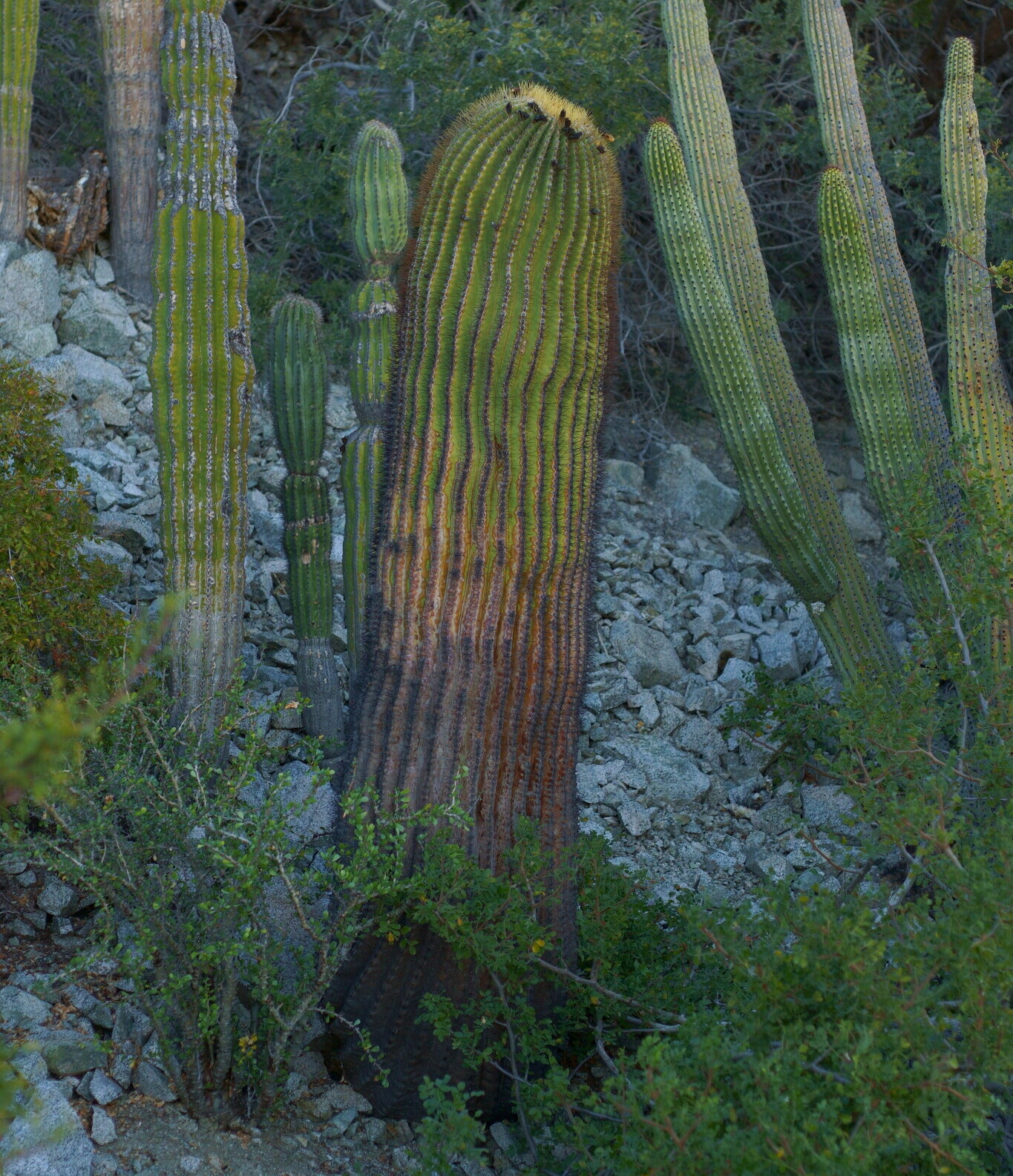
Mature plant on Santa Catalina Island

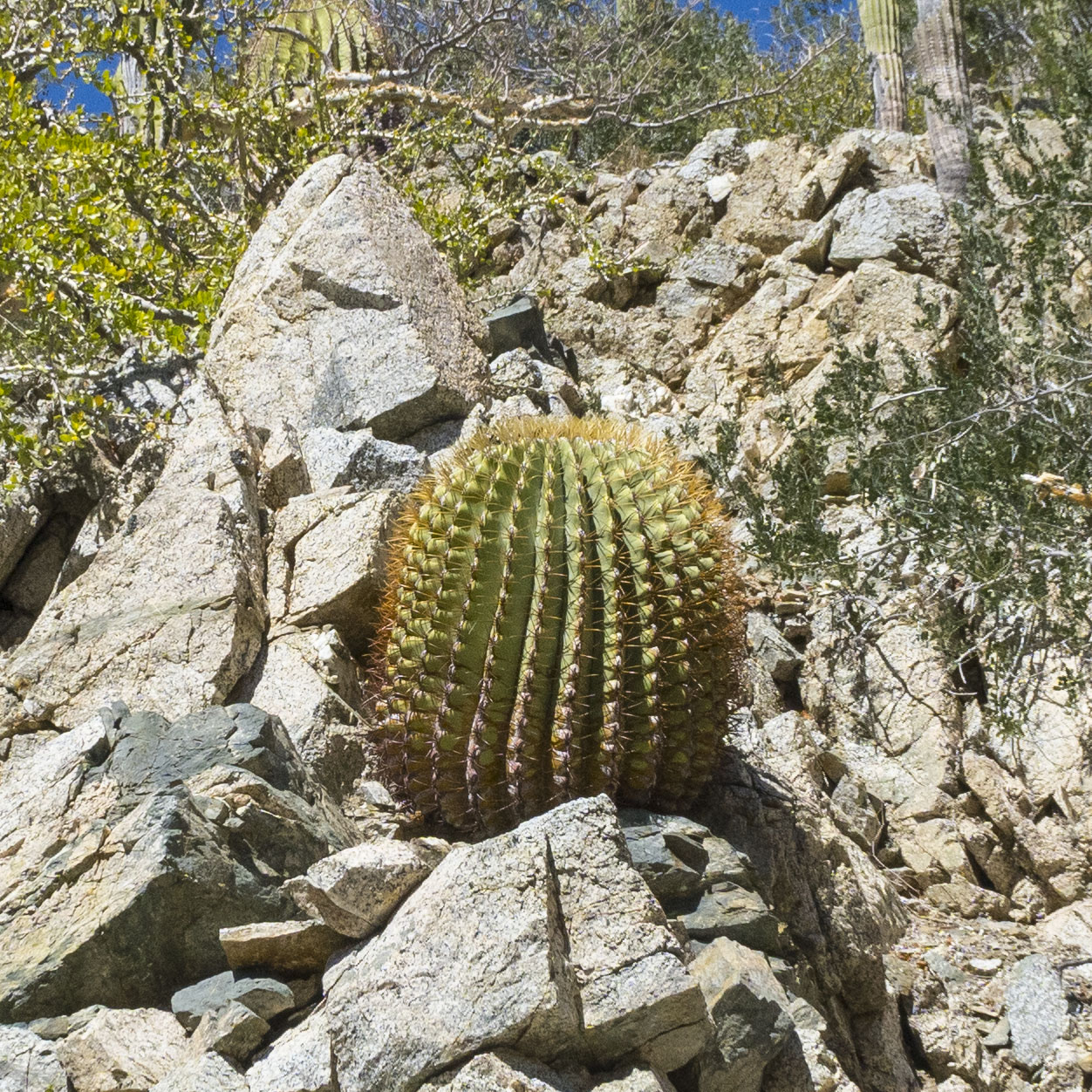
Small plant on Cerralvo Island

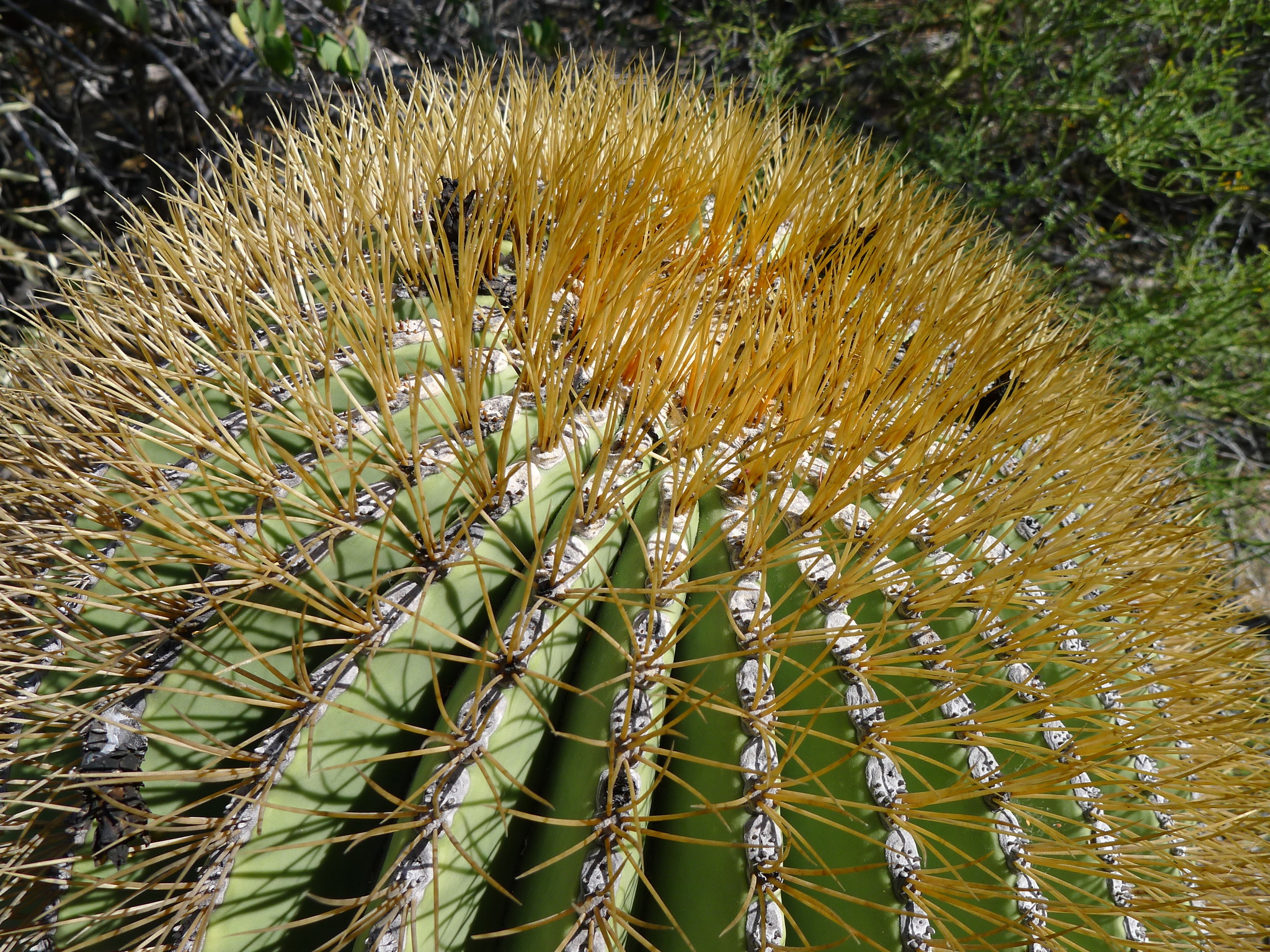
Closeup of spines

== Taxonomy ==
Echinocactus diguetii was described in 1898 by Frédéric Albert Constantin Weber, who named it in honor of its discoverer, Léon Diguet, a French explorer who was investigating pearl fisheries on Isla Santa Catalina.

In 1922, Nathaniel Lord Britton and Joseph Nelson Rose transferred the species to the genus Ferocactus, creating the current combination, Ferocactus diguetii.

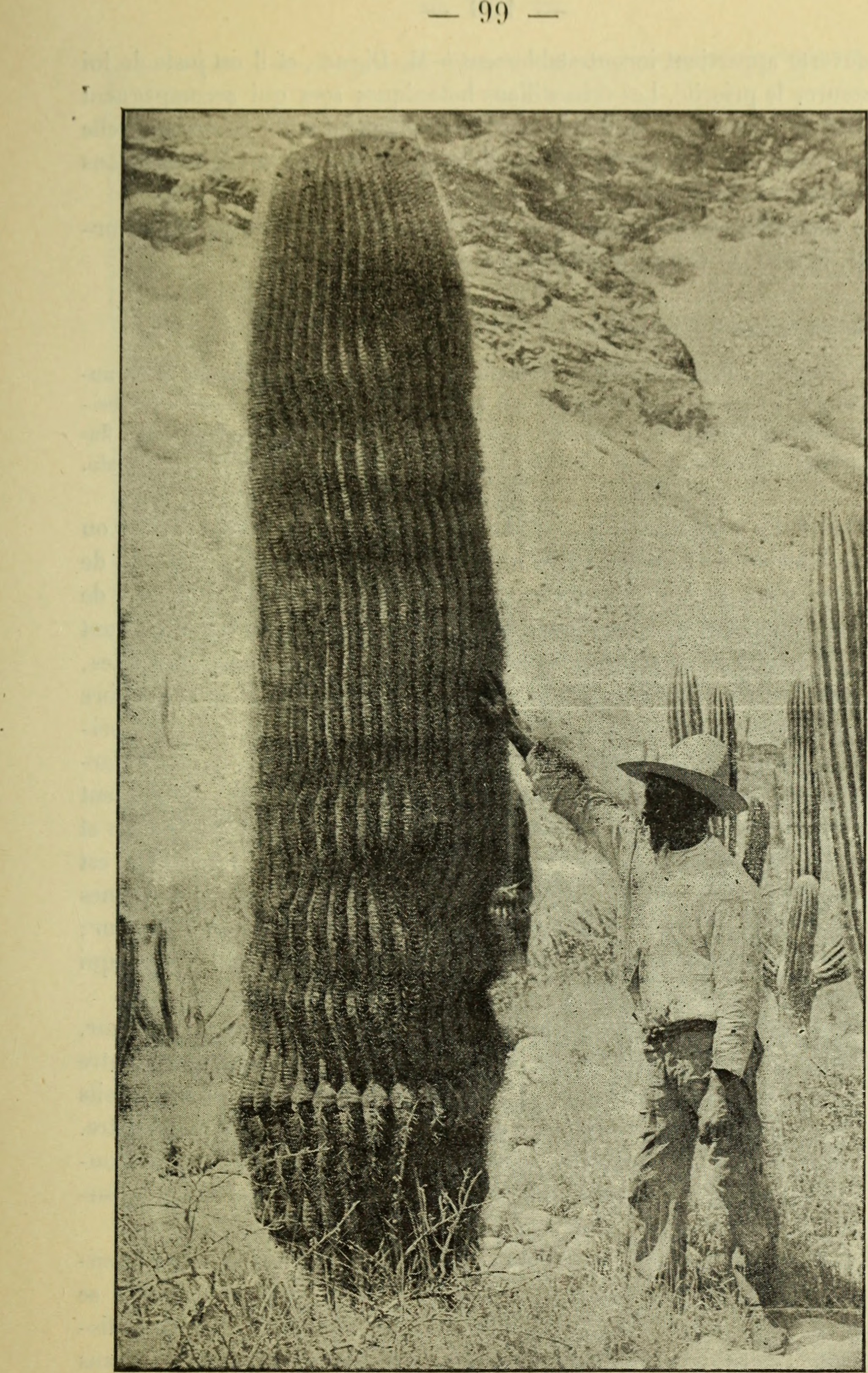
The plate of Echinocactus diguetii from the protologue by Weber, with a man standing next to the cactus

== Distribution and habitat ==
Ferocactus diguetii is endemic to the state of Baja California Sur in Mexico. It is only found on a number of islands in the southern Gulf of California, namely Isla del Carmen, Isla Danzante, Isla Monserrate, Isla Santa Catalina, Isla Santa Cruz, Isla San Diego, and Isla Cerralvo. Ivan M. Johnston reported the species for Isla Coronados, but it may be extirpated from that locality.

Ferocactus diguetii grows at elevations of 10–300 m (33–984 ft). Britton and Rose noted that the species did not seem to have a definite habitat, growing on from mountainsides along large igneous rocks to old shell beaches. The plant grows along with Bursera microphylla and Pachycereus pringlei.

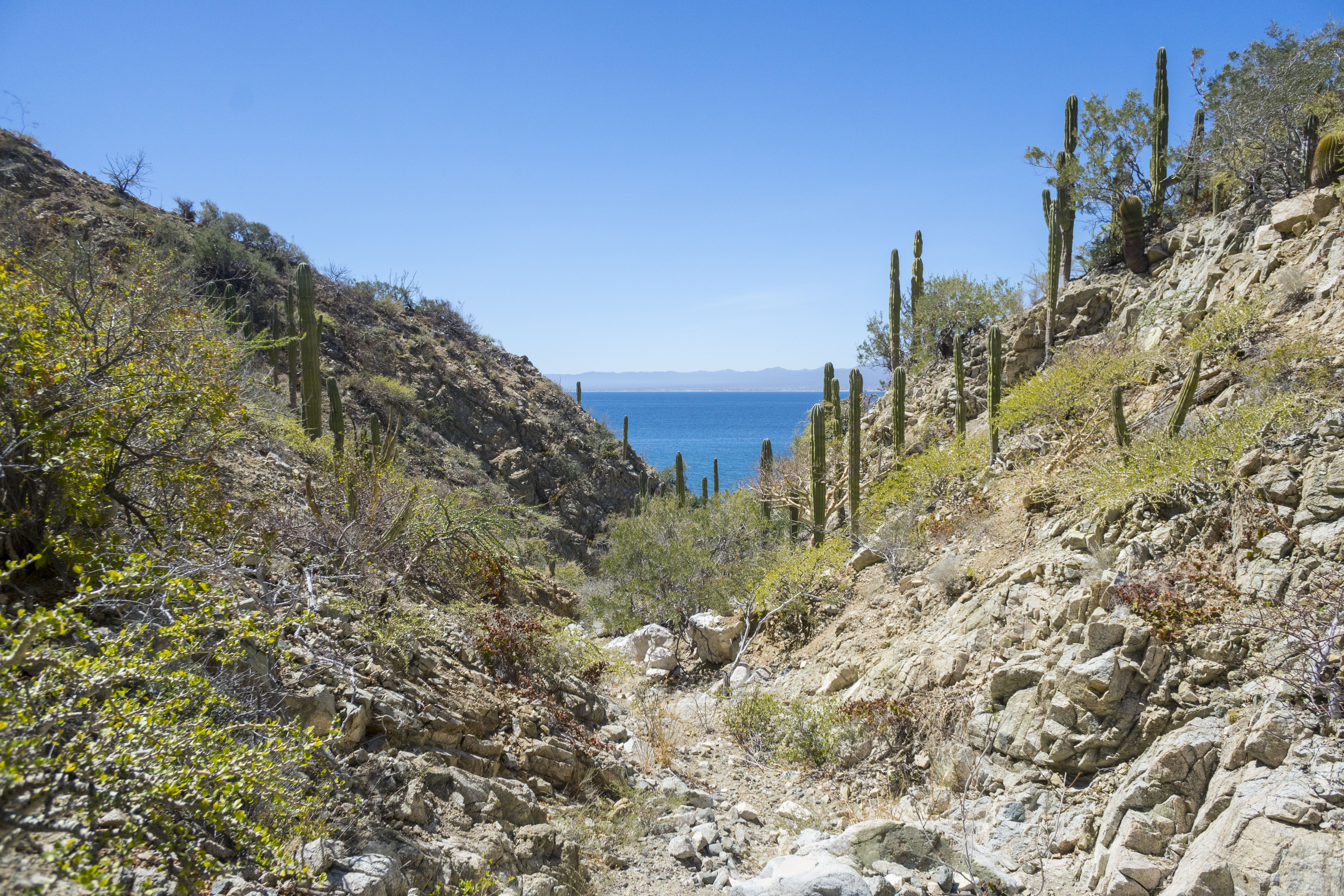
Habitat on Cerralvo Island coast showing F. diguetii growing along Bursera microphylla

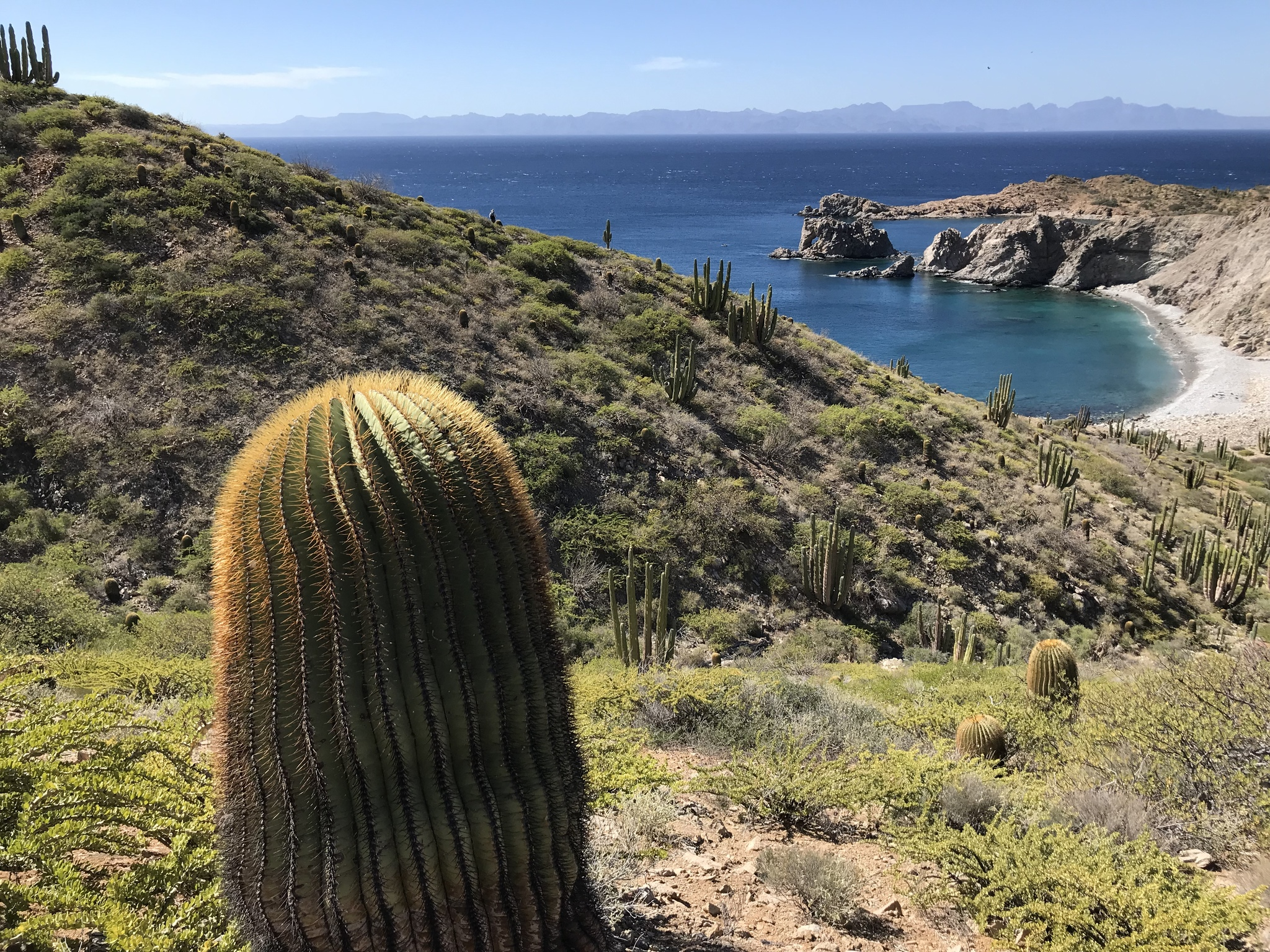
Habitat on Santa Catalina Island

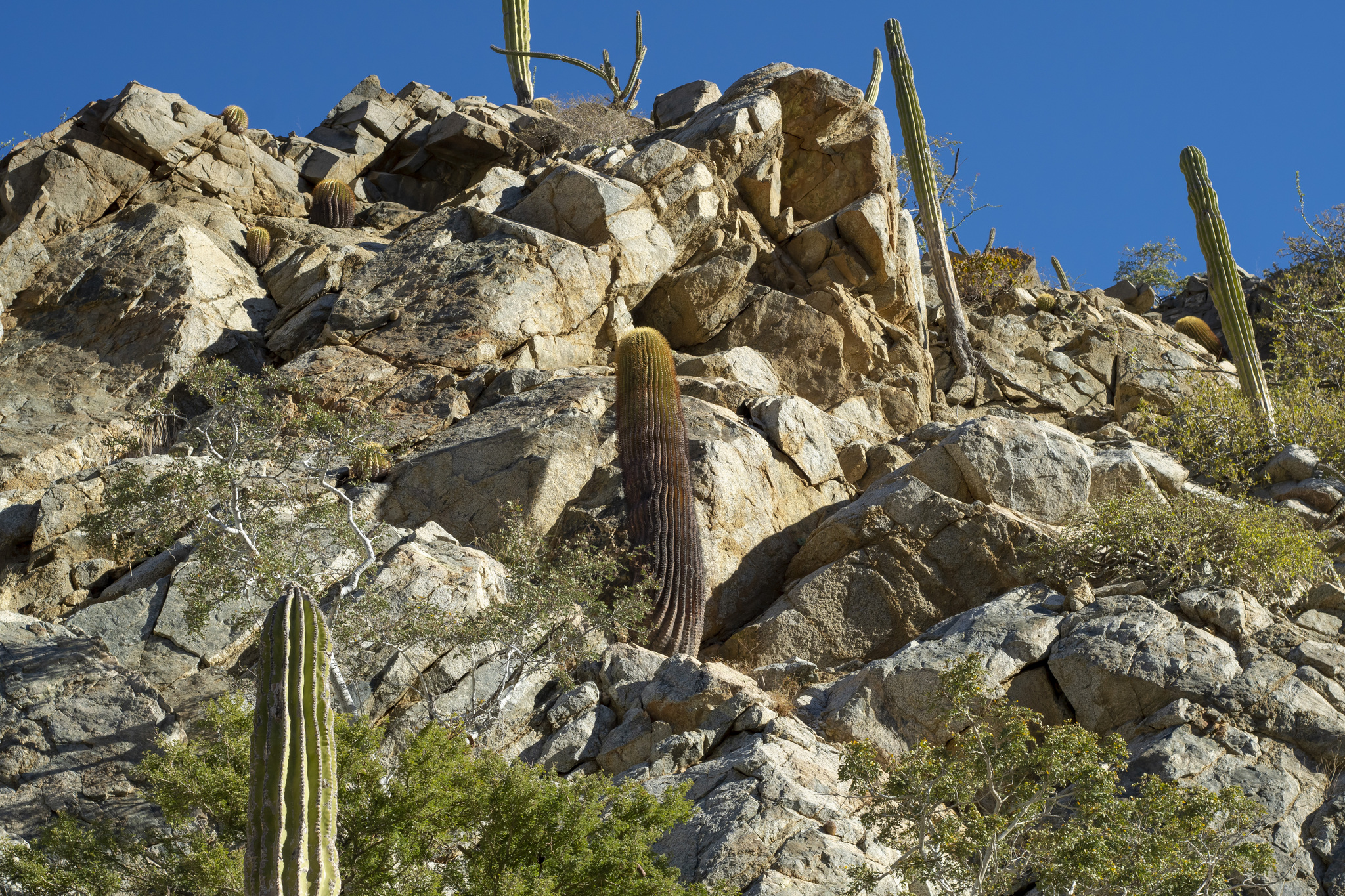
