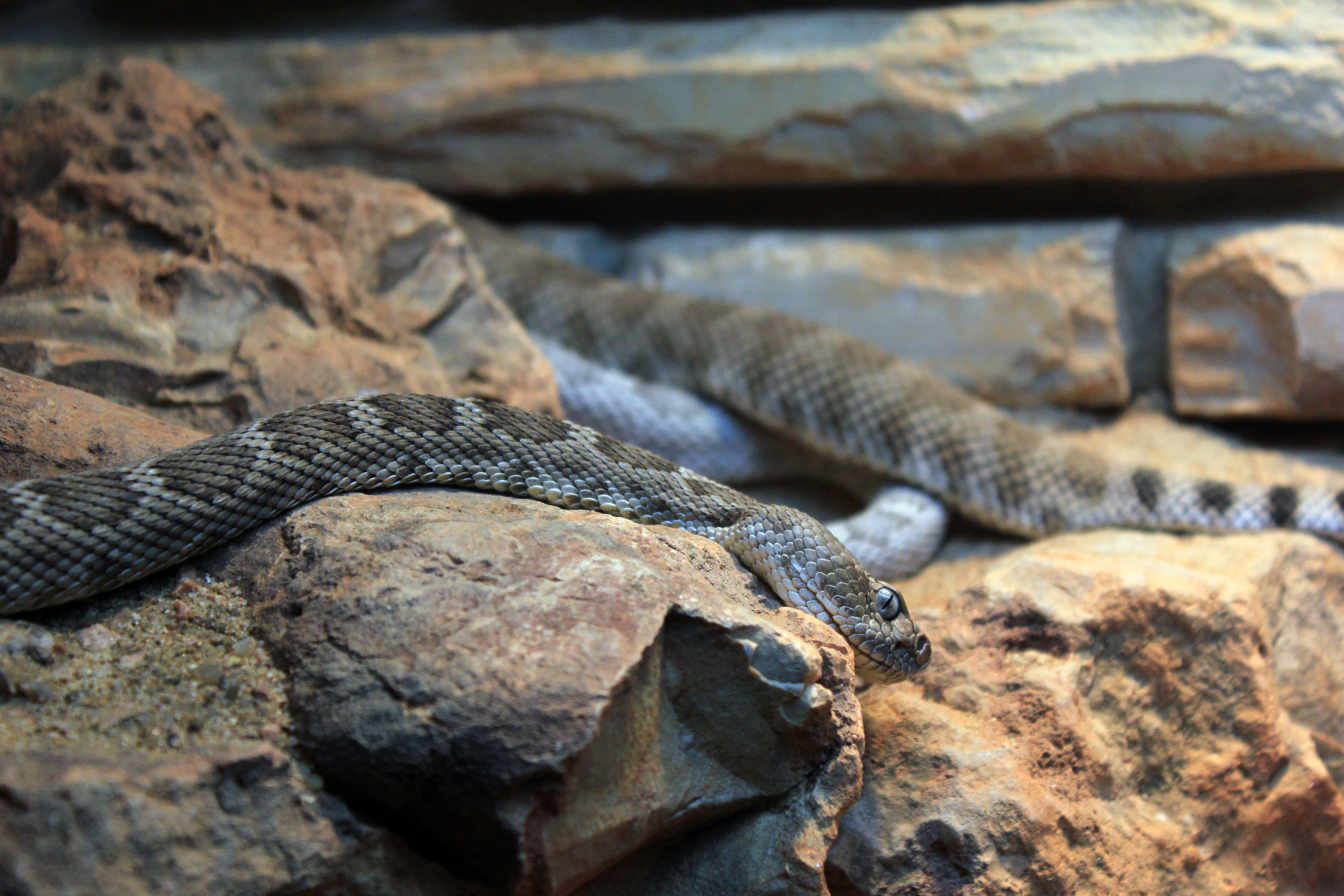

Conservation status
- Critically Endangered (IUCN 3.1)

Scientific classification
- Kingdom: Animalia
- Phylum: Chordata
- Class: Reptilia
- Order: Squamata
- Suborder: Serpentes
- Family: Viperidae
- Genus: Crotalus
- Species: C. catalinensis

Binomial name
- Crotalus catalinensis Cliff, 1954
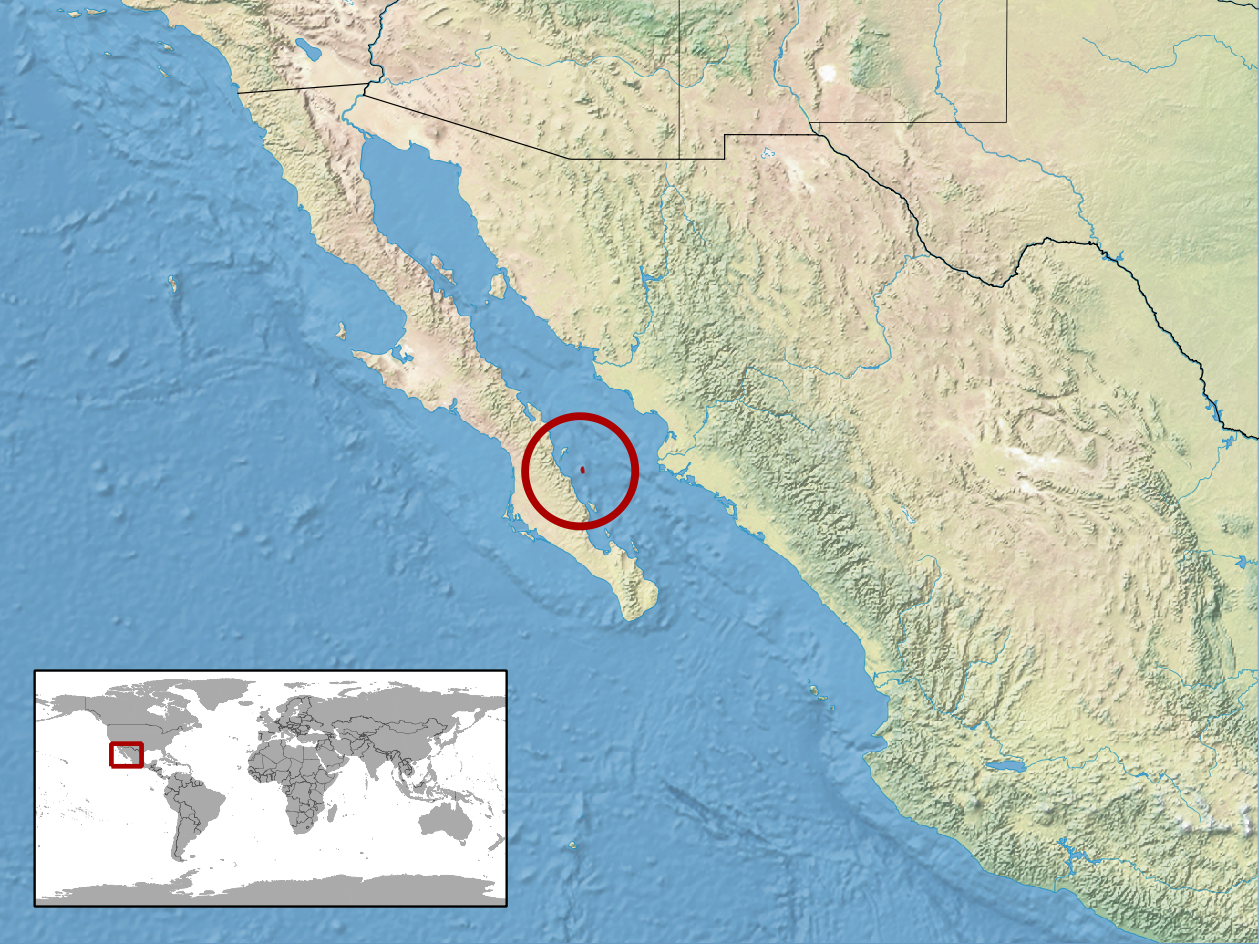

= Crotalus catalinensis =

Species of venomous pit viper native to Isla Santa Catalina, Mexico

The Santa Catalina rattlesnake (Crotalus catalinensis) is a species of pit viper endemic to Isla Santa Catalina in the Gulf of California just off the east coast of the state of Baja California Sur, Mexico. Like all other pit vipers, it is venomous. No subspecies are currently recognized. A relatively small and slender species, its most distinctive characteristic is that it lacks a rattle. They are also a generally nocturnal species. Though the species is classified as Critically Endangered on the IUCN Red List, there are few efforts for the snake's conservation.

== Description ==
This species is relatively slender and stunted, growing to a maximum of 73.1 cm (2 ft 4.8 in) in length.

The most distinctive feature of this snake is its lack of a rattle. The base of the tail, the "button", has degenerated to such an extent that the rattle immediately falls off with each shed instead of forming a new segment, as it does in other species of rattlesnakes. This is widely believed to be a localized adaptation, as the rattle becomes a liability rather than an asset while hunting. The lack of any large predators or hoofed mammals in its natural locale has also played a factor in making the rattle redundant. It appears that Crotalus catalinensis may not be alone in feeling these selective pressures, as red diamond rattlesnakes on the island of San Lorenzo Sur and San Esteban island black-tailed rattlesnakes also appear to be losing their rattles. Notably, it appears that this phenomenon is confined to populations limited to islands in the Gulf of California.

Natural selection has also given this snake a more elongated body than featured in related mainland forms, and measurably longer teeth; These are both characteristics associated with snakes that hunt in trees and shrubs such as this species. This species also lacks the standard bite-and-release tactic employed by usual rattlesnakes, preferring to instead hold prey in its jaws until the venom can take effect. In this way, it avoids the possibility that prey might fall out or fly away prior to succumbing.

Of the two distinct color variations, the predominant variant has a light cream-colored base, with reddish-brown blotching down the back, and black and white banding around the tail. The other variant has a much lighter, ash gray color, with darker gray blotching. The banding around the tail is still present. The banding tapers off and becomes more obscure. The two different colors were originally thought to be due to natural selection and therefore match different habitat backgrounds, but that has not been supported. There is no difference between the brown and grey within the habitat, as well as no difference in the frequency of color between males and females. However, evidence suggests that the darker coloration on the snakes make them more easily adaptable because of their ability to bask and absorb more heat. This causes their metabolism to speed up which provides them with faster digestion that helps increase strength and physical conditions. Due to these factors, the darker colored snakes have greater reproductive success than the lighter colored snakes. Though the dark snakes have these advantages, their coloration comes at a cost because they are more easily spotted by predators than the sand colored snakes.

== Geographic range ==
This snake is found only on Isla Santa Catalina in the Gulf of California off the coast of southern Baja California. This island is also the type locality for the species. The island is fairly small, being only 43 square kilometers (17 sq mi).

== Conservation status ==
This species is classified as Critically Endangered on the IUCN Red List with the following criteria: B1ab(v) (v3.1, 2001). This means that the best available evidence indicates it is considered to be facing an extremely high risk of extinction in the wild because its geographic range is estimated to be less than 100 km^{2} (39 sq mi), it exists at only a single location, and a continuing decline has been observed, inferred, or projected in the number of mature individuals. It was assessed in 2007.

It is threatened due to collecting and the introduction of alien predator species, such as domestic cats. This population of cats formerly invaded the island and have since been eradicated in 2002. There is no guarantee that the cats will not be reintroduced into the area, which could cause problems for the snake, whether that be from being preyed on themselves or through the population decline of their main food sources. The presence of these cats have negatively affected many populations of several other island reptile species.

Because the rattlesnake has such limited options for prey on the island, it is vital to maintain the populations of prey for the conservation of C. catalinensis, especially because the main species of prey for the snake, Peromyscus slevini, is endemic to the island.

Other threats include human influence such as killing out of fear and capturing for the illegal collection of rare wildlife. Because the Santa Catalina rattlesnake is an endemic species, and is without a rattle, the snake is more valued and therefore more threatened. Climate also impacts the Santa Catalina by influencing plant productivity which is mostly related to the vast differences in the quantity of rainfall. Environmental temperature fluctuations due to climate change affects the snakes because they are ectotherms- the outside temperature directly influences the snake's body temperature.

There are currently no movements towards the conservation of this species. Bahía de Loreto National Park considered the rattlesnake as "very difficult to observe" which adds to the lack of conservation efforts. Because this species is endemic to the island and the territory is fairly small, the area being 40.99 km^{2}, the snakes are faced with possible inbreeding, demographic and environmental stochasticity, and more. However, there are no studies, as of 2005, to support these speculations.

Each of these threats, along with the species' biological characteristics of late maturation, slow growth, few offspring and long periods of time between each breeding period, contributes to the vulnerability of the species. Conservation efforts for the habitats of Santa Catalina Island as well as the prey of C. catalinensis would improve the rattlesnake's risk of extinction.

== Habitat ==
The habitat on Santa Catalina Island consists of Gulf Coast desert plants. This snake is often found on the western side of the island within the many arroyos. The Santa Catalina rattlesnake is also found in plains, bottoms of ravines, and riverbeds of streams. They are found on summits of rocky hills where they often find shelter in the rock crevices. One of the main shelter options is dense vegetation which can also be used as an efficient way to find prey. It is believed that the snakes find shelter in the vegetation to help maintain a constant body temperature as well as use the density to hide from predators.

== Behavior ==
While most members of this genus, Crotalus, are almost entirely terrestrial due to their heavy body structure, this species' small size makes it a swift and skillful climber. Previous researchers hypothesized that the ability of the Santa Catalina rattlesnake to climb, combined with its lack of a rattle allowed it to hunt roosting birds, but detailed research into the species' diet has revealed that the Santa Catalina rattlesnake maintains a mammal-based diet like most rattlesnakes. Further inquiry into the arboreal behavior of this island species has shown individuals actually spend the majority of their time on the ground. Individuals were most likely to be found in low branches of bushes during July, the hottest month on the island. The Santa Catalina rattlesnake is thought to climb off of the hot ground and into bushes to thermoregulate. The snake expresses thermo-conformist behavior which means that its body temperature correlates with soil temperature. This is a common trait among other rattlesnakes.

Unlike most species of rattlesnakes, the Santa Catalina rattlesnake is often observed exposed; it does not tend to hide. Currently, the greater evidence supports the theory that the Santa Catalina rattlesnake has evolved away from having a rattle because it has no need for a warning mechanism against predators.

Though it was previously thought that the snakes presented diurnal and nocturnal habits, more evidence suggests that they are completely nocturnal, even during winter months. The Santa Catalina Rattlesnake does not hibernate.

== Feeding ==
Previous theories suggested the tendency for this rattlesnake to climb into low bushes was connected to a dietary shift toward consuming birds. However, studies conducted from 2002 to 2004 revealed that stomach and fecal contents were 70% mammal (Santa Catalina deer mouse, Peromyscus slevini) and 30% lizard species (Santa Catalina desert iguana, Dipsosaurus catalinensis; Santa Catalina side-blotched lizard, Uta squamata; and Sceloporus lineatulus.) "We found no bird remains in scats or stomach contents of C. catalinensis in any year or season."

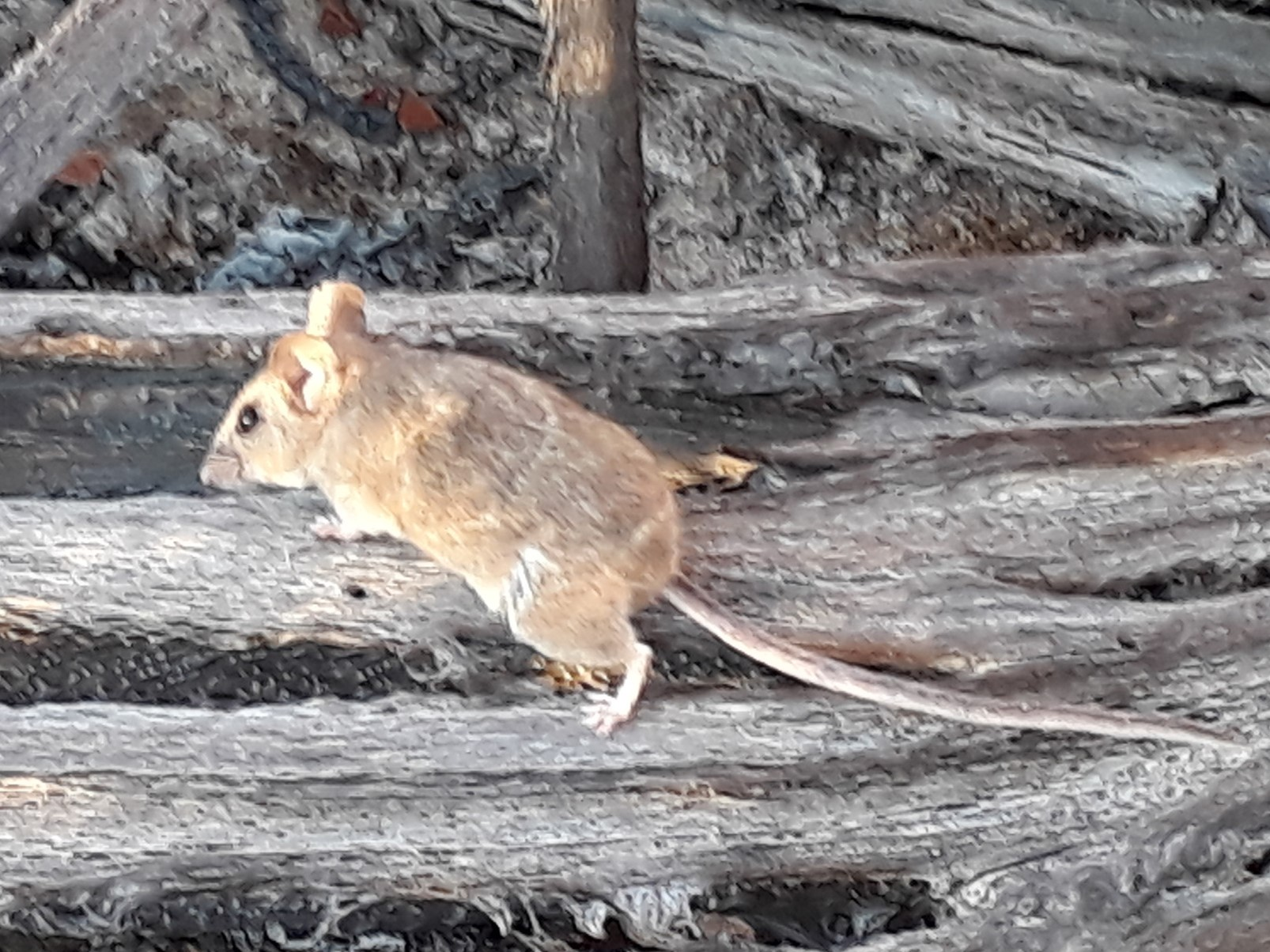
The main prey of C. catalinensis is Slevin's mouse (Peromyscus slevini).

The diet of this rattlesnake is a fraction of the diet of its closest relative, the Red diamond rattlesnake, Crotalus ruber. C. ruber, like most rattlesnakes, frequently prey on lizards and small mammals such as mice, rats, and squirrels. C. ruber also is known to eat frogs, toads, birds, and other snakes. The restricted diet of the Santa Catalina Rattlesnake compared to its sister species is likely due to the limited prey diversity on the island. Small body size in the Santa Catalina rattlesnake may be an evolutionary response to their reliance on small-sized prey. For example, the main prey is the endemic Santa Catalina Deer Mouse, Peromyscus slevini, which are measured to 21 cm (8.3 in) in total length including the tail, which is 10 centimeters (3.9 in).

Like other rattlesnake species from central and northern Mexico, the Santa Catalina rattlesnake has greater foraging activity during the summer and rainy season (July–October).

== Taxonomy ==
Laurence Klauber (1972) suggested this species is closely related to C. scutulatus. However, a later study by Murphy and Crabtree (1985) used allozyme data to conclude the Santa Catalina rattlesnake shares its most recent ancestor with C. ruber. Most of the morphological, biogeographic, and biochemical data suggest the same.
