= Santa Cruz mouse =

Conservation status
- Endangered (IUCN 3.1)

Scientific classification
- Kingdom: Animalia
- Phylum: Chordata
- Class: Mammalia
- Order: Rodentia
- Family: Cricetidae
- Subfamily: Neotominae
- Genus: Peromyscus
- Species: P. sejugis

Binomial name
- Peromyscus sejugis Burt, 1932

Species of rodent

The Santa Cruz mouse (Peromyscus sejugis) is a species of rodent in the family Cricetidae. It is a species of the genus Peromyscus, a closely related group of New World mice often called "deermice". It is endemic to Mexico, where it is found only on two small islands in the southern Gulf of California. Feral cats on Santa Cruz Island are a threat.

== Description ==
The Santa Cruz mouse is a relatively large member of its genus, measuring 16 to 20 cm (6.3 to 7.9 in) in total length, including a tail 7 to 9 cm (2.8 to 3.5 in) long, and weighing an average of 22 g (0.78 oz). The fur on the upper parts of the body is a dull greyish color, with a yellow-brown face, and sometimes a yellowish line along the flanks. The underparts are white, and the tail is distinctly darker on its upper surface than on its lower. It is generally similar in appearance to the North American deermouse, but is larger, with a longer snout and a duller color.

== Distribution and habitat ==
The mouse is found only on Santa Cruz Island and the neighboring islet of San Diego, both of which lie in the south-western Gulf of California, about 17 km (11 mi) from the mainland. The larger island, with an area of 14 km^{2} (5.4 sq mi), is rocky and rugged, with the dominant vegetation including elephant trees, clustervines, and nettlespurge. Mice have been collected from the bottoms of ravines on the island, rather than on the hilltops. San Diego Island, with an area of just 1.3 km^{2} (0.50 sq mi), is little more than a single rocky mound with some ground vegetation and cacti. Santa Cruz mice are the only native mammals known to live on the islands.
