= Western diamond rattlesnake =

Western diamond rattlesnake may refer to:

- Crotalus atrox, a.k.a. the western diamondback rattlesnake, a venomous pitviper species found in the United States and Mexico
- Crotalus ruber, a.k.a. the red rattlesnake, a venomous pitviper species found in southwestern California in the United States and Baja California in Mexico
