= Diamond rattlesnake =

Diamond rattlesnake may refer to:

- Crotalus adamanteus, a.k.a. the eastern diamondback rattlesnake, a venomous pitviper species found in the southeastern United States
- Crotalus atrox, a.k.a. the western diamondback rattlesnake, a venomous pitviper species found in the United States and Mexico
- Crotalus ruber, a.k.a. the red diamond rattlesnake, a venomous pitviper species found in southwestern California in the United States and Baja California in Mexico
