= Ruberlysin =

Enzyme

Identifiers
- EC no.: 3.4.24.48
- CAS no.: 846020-01-7

Databases
- IntEnz: IntEnz view
- BRENDA: BRENDA entry
- ExPASy: NiceZyme view
- KEGG: KEGG entry
- MetaCyc: metabolic pathway
- PRIAM: profile
- PDB structures: RCSB PDB PDBe PDBsum
Search
- PMC: articles
- PubMed: articles
- NCBI: proteins

Ruberlysin (EC 3.4.24.48, Crotalus ruber metalloendopeptidase II, hemorrhagic toxin II) is an enzyme. This enzyme catalyses the following chemical reaction

Cleavage of His^{10}-Leu, Ala^{14}-Leu, Tyr^{16}-Leu and Gly^{23}-Phe bonds in the B chain of insulin; His-Pro, Pro-Phe, and Trp-Ser of angiotensin I; and Gly-Phe of Met enkephalin

This endopeptidase is present in the venom of the red rattlesnake (Crotalus ruber ruber).
