= Bahía de Loreto National Park =

National park in Baja California Sur, Mexico

- Parque Nacional Bahía de Loreto
- IUCN category II (national park)
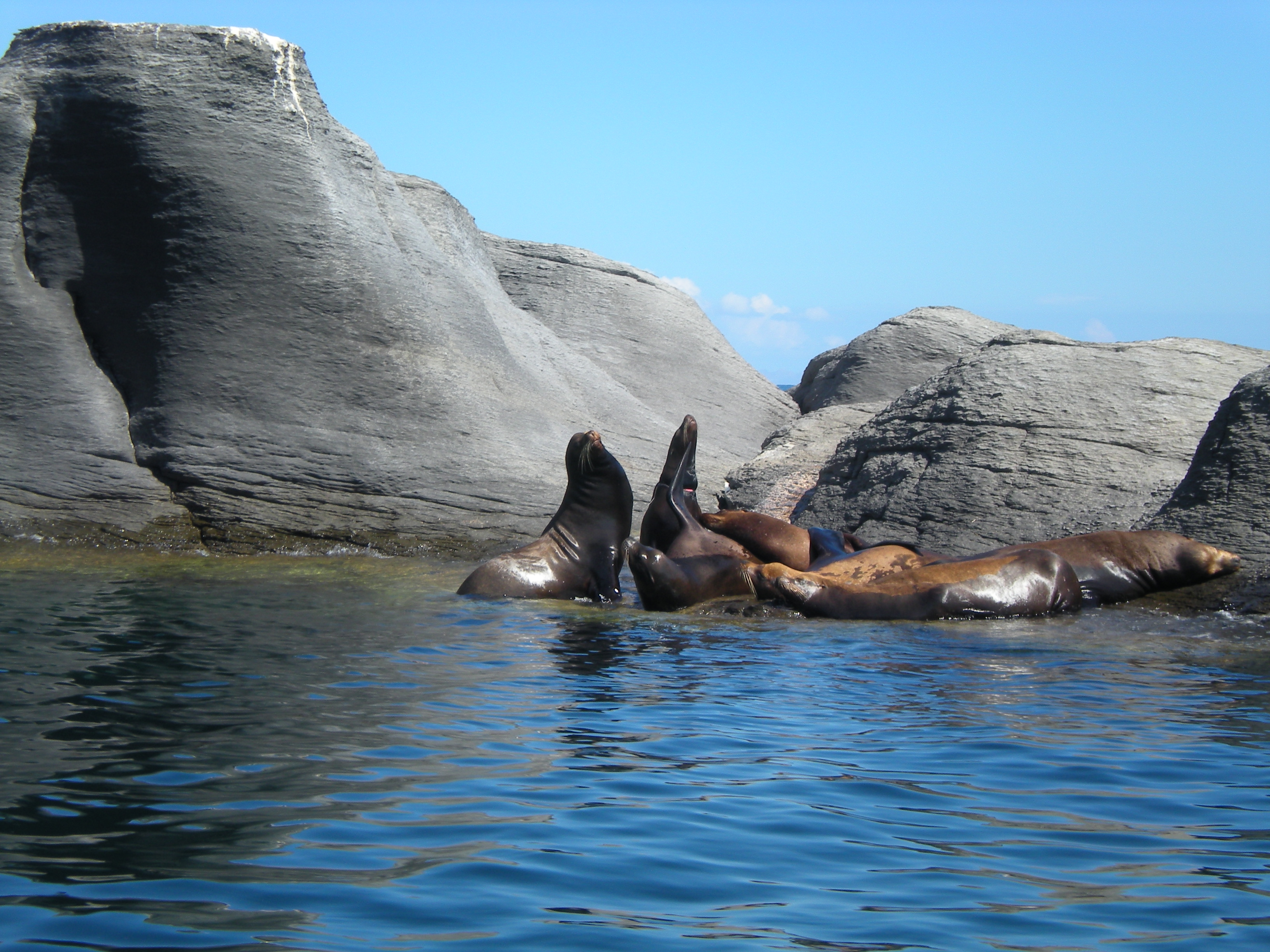
- Sea Lions (Zalophus californianus) on the Isle of Coronado

- Location within Mexico
- Interactive map of Bahía de Loreto National Park
- Location: Baja California Sur, Mexico
- Nearest city: Loreto, Baja California Sur
- Coordinates: 25°51′51″N 111°07′18″W
- Area: 206,580.75 hectares (510,472.2 acres)
- Established: July 19, 1996
- Governing body: National Commission of Protected Natural Areas
- Website: www.loreto.com/loreto-national-park-info/

UNESCO World Heritage Site
- Official name: Islands and Protected Areas of the Gulf of California
- Type: Natural
- Criteria: vii, ix, x
- Designated: 2005 (29th session)
- Reference no.: 1182
- Region: Latin America and the Caribbean

Ramsar Wetland
- Official name: Parque Nacional Bahía de Loreto
- Designated: 2 February 2004
- Reference no.: 1358

Bahía de Loreto National Park (Spanish: Parque Nacional Bahía de Loreto) is a national park on the east coast of the Baja California Peninsula in Mexico, about 203 kilometres (126 mi) north of the city of La Paz in the state of Baja California Sur. The park protects 2,065.81 square kilometres (797.61 sq mi) of relatively pristine marine ecosystem in the central Sea of Cortez, including five large uninhabited islands and many smaller islets in Loreto Bay. It is known for its great variety of coastal environments, such as sandy beaches, sea cliffs, submarine canyons, and marine terraces, and is home to an exceptionally high biological diversity, especially of marine mammals.

The national park was created by federal decree on July 19, 1996, and is administered by the Natural Commission of Protected Natural Areas (CONANP), an agency of Mexico's Secretariat of Environment and Natural Resources. In 2004, it joined the Ramsar list of Wetlands of International Importance, and in 2005, it was declared a UNESCO World Heritage Site collectively with many other protected areas in the Gulf of California.

== Description ==
Bahía de Loreto National Park protects Loreto Bay, located in northwest Mexico off the coast of Loreto Municipality in the state of Baja California Sur. The park covers an area of 206,581 hectares (510,470 acres), 88% of which is ocean surface; the islands, islets, and coastal regions that comprise the remaining 12% are mostly uninhabited. Five main islands serve as the park's chief focal points and tourist destinations: Isla Coronados, Isla del Carmen, Isla Danzante, Isla Monserrate, and Isla Santa Catalina.

The city of Loreto abuts park territory. It is the primary starting point for park tours and has a major influence on the area's ecology.

== See also ==
- List of national parks of Mexico
