= Sceloporus angustus =

Santa Cruz Island sator

Scientific classification
- Domain: Eukaryota
- Kingdom: Animalia
- Phylum: Chordata
- Class: Reptilia
- Order: Squamata
- Suborder: Iguania
- Family: Phrynosomatidae
- Genus: Sceloporus
- Species: S. angustus

Binomial name
- Sceloporus angustus (Dickerson, 1919)

Synonyms
- Sator angustus Dickerson, 1919; Sceloporus angustus — Liner & Casas-Andreu, 2008

Species of lizard

Sceloporus angustus, the Isla Santa Cruz sator, is a species of phrynosomatid lizard found on Isla Santa Cruz and Isla San Diego in the Gulf of California, Baja California Sur, Mexico, where it exploits a great variety of temperate habitats, such as rocky areas, caves along beaches, areas of beach cobblestones, and sandy substrates. It is also seen on the branches of small bushes and the limbs of cardones (cacti).
