= Isla Santa Cruz =

Isla Santa Cruz may refer to:

- Isla Santa Cruz (Baja California Sur)
- Santa Cruz Island (Galápagos)
- Santa Cruz Island in the Channel Islands
