= Crotalus ruber lucasensis =

Scientific classification
- Kingdom: Animalia
- Phylum: Chordata
- Class: Reptilia
- Order: Squamata
- Suborder: Serpentes
- Family: Viperidae
- Genus: Crotalus
- Species: C. ruber
- Subspecies: C. r. lucasensis

Trinomial name
- Crotalus ruber lucasensis Van Denburgh, 1920

Synonyms
- Crotalus lucasensis Van Denburgh, 1920; Crotalus atrox lucasensis – Schmidt, 1922; Crotalus ruber lucasensis – Klauber, 1949; Crotalus exsul lucasensis – Grismer, McGuire & Hollingsworth, 1994; Crotalus ruber lucasensis – Mattison, 2007

Subspecies of snake

Crotalus ruber lucasensis, the San Lucan diamond rattlesnake, is a venomous pitviper subspecies found in Mexico in the Cape region of lower Baja California.

== Description ==
Similarly to C. r. ruber, adult specimens commonly exceed 100 centimetres (39 in) in length. Both of these subspecies can be identified by having prenasals that are usually in contact with the first pair of supralabials, an absence of interchinshields, and by having tail rings that are either complete, or broken at the midline, but usually not laterally. However, this subspecies in particular exhibits a tendency for rattle loss.

== Geographic range ==
Found in Mexico in the cape region of lower Baja California. The type locality given is "Agua Caliente, Cape Region of Lower [Baja] California, Mexico."
