= Catalina Island leaf-toed gecko =

Conservation status
- Least Concern (IUCN 3.1)

Scientific classification
- Kingdom: Animalia
- Phylum: Chordata
- Order: Squamata
- Suborder: Gekkota
- Family: Phyllodactylidae
- Genus: Phyllodactylus
- Species: P. bugastrolepis

Binomial name
- Phyllodactylus bugastrolepis Dixon, 1966

Species of lizard

The Catalina Island leaf-toed gecko (Phyllodactylus bugastrolepis) is a species of gecko. It is endemic to Isla Santa Catalina in Gulf of California, Mexico.
