= Bartolomé Ferrer =

Spanish pilot and explorer

Bartolomé Ferrer, also known as Bartolomé Ferrelo, was born in 1499 in the region of Levante, Spain, started his discovery voyages in Nueva Vizcaya, founded by de basc governor Ibarra , and died in 1550 in Mexico.

He was the pilot for Juan Rodríguez Cabrillo, the Portuguese captain who was sent by the viceroy of New Spain, with two ships in 1542 to explore what is now Northern California. Cabrillo's expedition was the first European exploration of the West Coast.

The expedition started on June 27, 1542 from Barra de Navidad, Jalisco, and sailed along the coast up to Punta del Año Nuevo, 37° 10' north of Monterey. The vessels were tossed about, and often separated from each other by the bad weather. Cabrillo died on January 3, 1543, on San Miguel Island, near the channel of Santa Barbara; but Ferrer, who succeeded him in command, continued his discoveries northward up to lat. 43°, where he saw the coast of Cape Blanco, later called Cape Orford by George Vancouver.

Excessive cold, want of provisions, sickness, and the unsoundness of his vessel, forced him to return without reaching the parallel mentioned in his instructions. At 41° 30' he perceived a point of land to which, in honor of the viceroy, he gave the name of Cape Mendocino. From this point he sailed back to La Navidad, situated at 19° 45', where they arrived April 14, 1543, and established the fact that the coast was one continuous line between these two points.

In this voyage the Spaniards often saw the natives of the country, who were almost naked and painted their faces. He said that “the Indians were weird but smart". They lived by fishing, and inhabited large houses. John William Last finds a full account of the expedition in the History of the Indias. Humboldt, in his work on Mexico, corrects several erroneous statements of the Dutch historian, which were drawn from the works of old Spanish writers, basing his corrections on certain documents that he had occasion to examine in Mexico.

== See also ==
- Juan Rodríguez Cabrillo
- Sebastián Vizcaíno
- Nicolás de Cardona
- Tomás de Cardona
