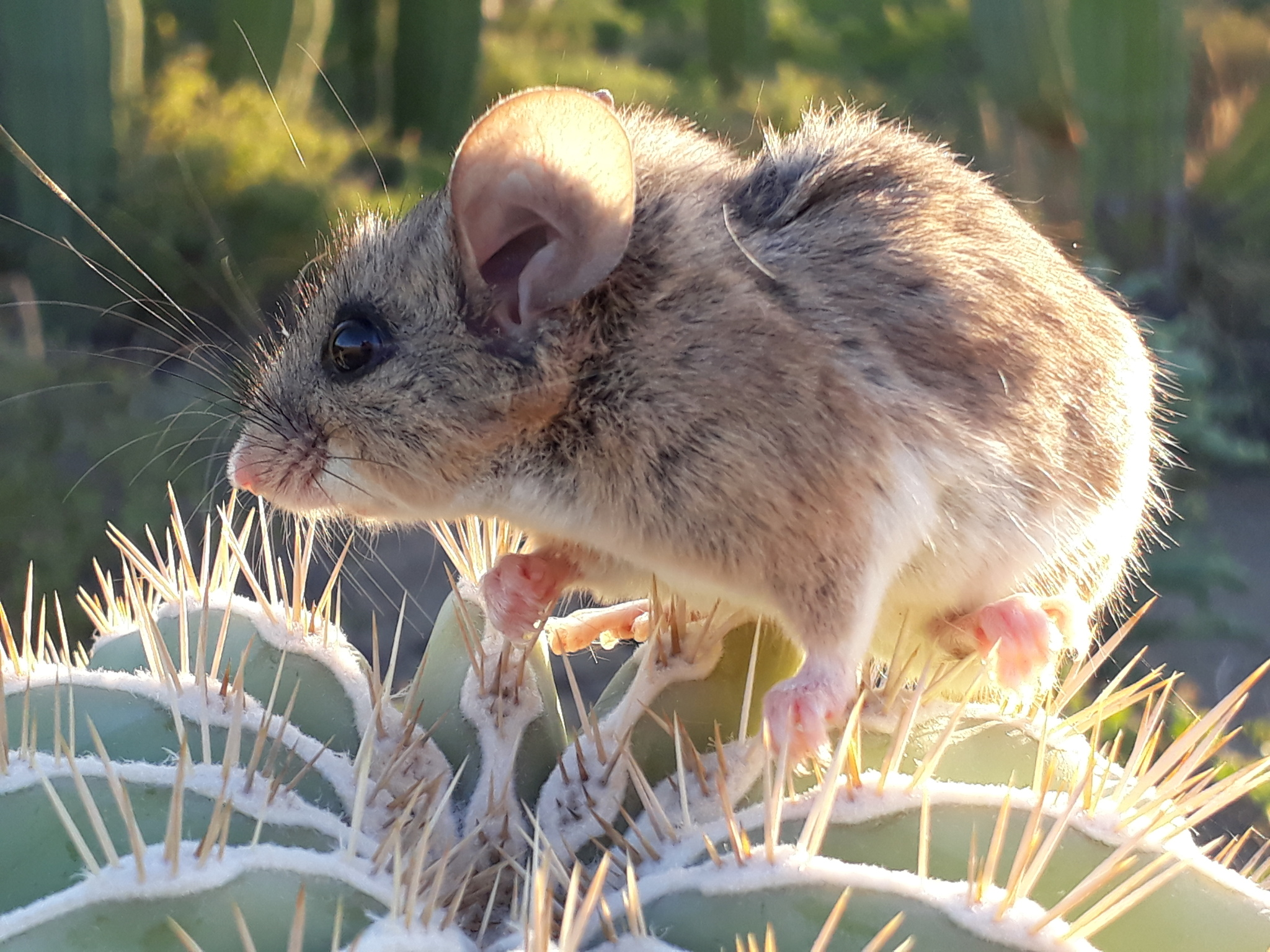

Conservation status
- Critically Endangered (IUCN 3.1)

Scientific classification
- Kingdom: Animalia
- Phylum: Chordata
- Class: Mammalia
- Order: Rodentia
- Family: Cricetidae
- Subfamily: Neotominae
- Genus: Peromyscus
- Species: P. slevini

Binomial name
- Peromyscus slevini Mailliard, 1924

= Slevin's mouse =

Species of rodent

Slevin's mouse (Peromyscus slevini), also known as the Catalina deermouse, (Note: Not to be confused with Peromyscus maniculatus catalinae, an endemic deermouse subspecies on Santa Catalina Island, California) is a species of rodent in the family Cricetidae. It is a species of the genus Peromyscus, a closely related group of New World mice often called "deermice". It is endemic to Isla Santa Catalina off the east coast of Baja California Sur, an island with an area of about 40 km^{2} (15 sq mi), and it is the only native mammal on the island. It is named for Joseph Slevin, a curator at the California Academy of Sciences.

Slevin's mouse is a large-bodied mouse, measuring about 21 cm (8.3 in) in total length, of which 10 centimetres (3.9 in) are the tail. They have pale cinnamon fur, mixed with dusky hairs, over the body, head, and flanks, with near-white underparts. They appear very similar to the related California mouse, but are paler in color and slightly larger. However, it may be most closely related to the North American deer mouse.

The species is threatened by competition with the introduced Northern Baja deer mouse, which was probably introduced by local fishermen.
