= Lampropeltis catalinensis =

Conservation status
- Data Deficient (IUCN 3.1)

Scientific classification
- Kingdom: Animalia
- Phylum: Chordata
- Class: Reptilia
- Order: Squamata
- Suborder: Serpentes
- Family: Colubridae
- Genus: Lampropeltis
- Species: L. catalinensis

Binomial name
- Lampropeltis catalinensis Van Denburgh & Slevin, 1921

Species of snake

Lampropeltis catalinensis, commonly known as the Santa Catalina kingsnake, is a species of nonvenomous snake in the family Colubridae. It is found on Isla Santa Catalina in Mexico.
