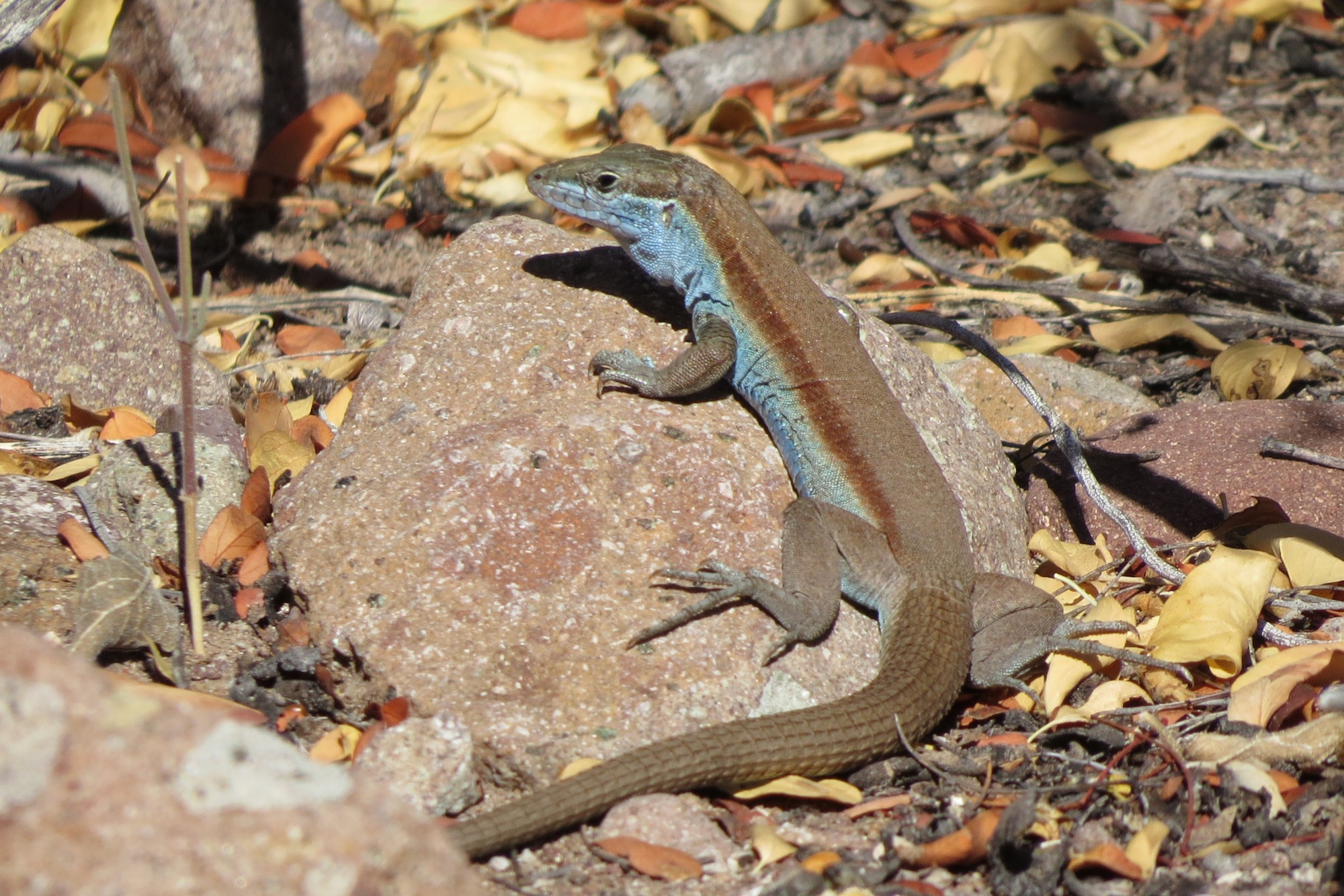
- Aspidoscelis pictus in Isla Monserrate

Conservation status
- Least Concern (IUCN 3.1)

Scientific classification
- Kingdom: Animalia
- Phylum: Chordata
- Class: Reptilia
- Order: Squamata
- Suborder: Lacertoidea
- Family: Teiidae
- Genus: Aspidoscelis
- Species: A. pictus

Binomial name
- Aspidoscelis pictus (Van Denburgh & Slevin, 1921)

= Aspidoscelis pictus =

Species of lizard

Aspidoscelis pictus, the Isla Monserrate whiptail, is a species of teiid lizard endemic to Isla Monserrate in Mexico.
