= Isla Santa Catalina side-blotched lizard =

Conservation status
- Least Concern (IUCN 3.1)

Scientific classification
- Kingdom: Animalia
- Phylum: Chordata
- Class: Reptilia
- Order: Squamata
- Suborder: Iguania
- Family: Phrynosomatidae
- Genus: Uta
- Species: U. squamata

Binomial name
- Uta squamata Dickerson, 1919

Species of lizard

The Isla Santa Catalina side-blotched lizard (Uta squamata) is a species of lizard. It is endemic to Isla Santa Catalina in the Gulf of California, Mexico. This species of lizard can be as long as 2.2 inches.
