= Isla Santa Catalina =

Island of Baja California Sur, Mexico

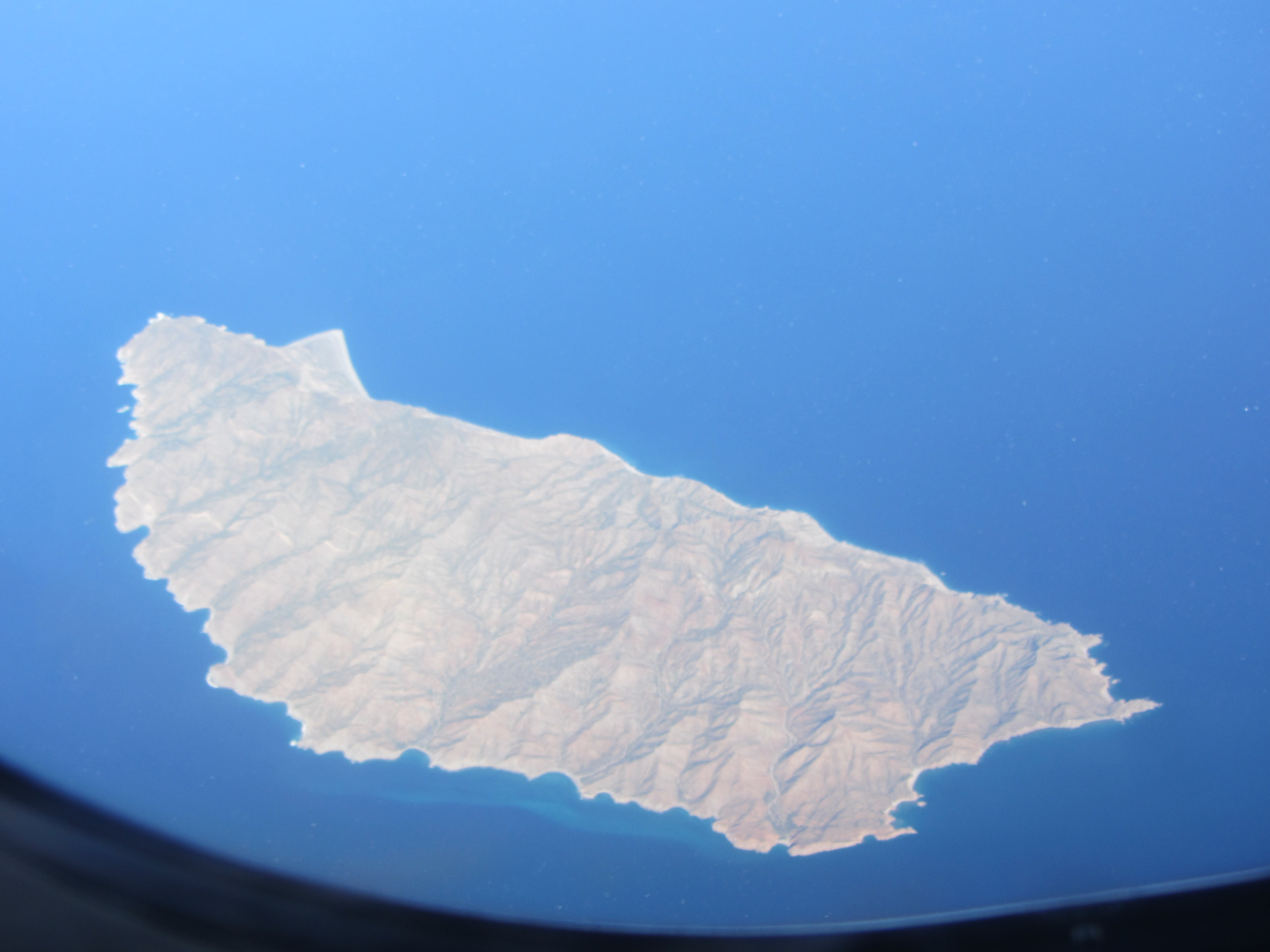
- Aerial photo of Isla Santa Catalina

- Location within Mexico

Geography
- Location: Gulf of California
- Coordinates: 25°39′9.53″N 110°46′51.25″W
- Highest elevation: 448 m (1470 ft)

Administration
- Mexico
- State: Baja California Sur

Demographics
- Population: Uninhabited

Isla Santa Catalina, officially known as Isla Catalana, is an island in the Gulf of California east of the Baja California Peninsula. The island is uninhabited and is part of the Loreto Municipality.

The island is located south of the Gulf of California and is located 25 km from the peninsula of Baja California. It has about 13 km long and 4 km wide maximum with total area of 39.273 square kilometers. Isla Catalana, being uninhabited, is separated by the sea from the nearest town, Loreto, which lies about 60 km away.

== Official name ==
The official and traditional name of the island is “Isla Catalana”. The confusion was caused by some documents of cartographic service of the United States, that wrote in a chart the name “Isla Santa Catalina”.

Originally named Isla Catalan, it was frequently called Isla Catalana. In the mid 1850s when the U.S. Navy charted the Gulf the mapmakers changed the name to Isla Santa Catalina.

— A natural history guide to Baja California. Kathleen Johnson Dickey. 1983.

In some scientific papers, authors use both names. The official Mexican name of Isla catalana, and the one that became internationally spread by error.

== Biology ==
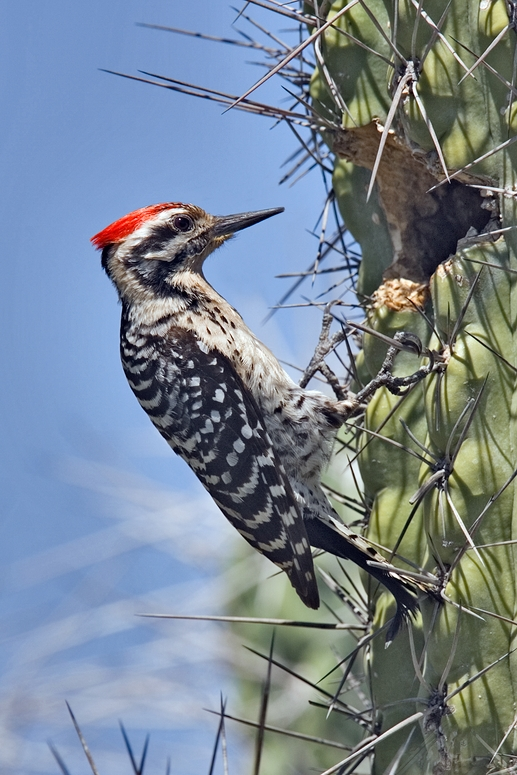
Picoides scalaris

=== Flora ===
- Ferocactus diguetii.
  - This previous variety of cactus discovered by Leon Diguet and endemic to the islands of the Sea of Cortés, grows the tallest specimens on Isla Catalana.

=== Fauna ===
==== Birds ====
- Picoides scalaris
- Melanerpes uropygialis
- Zenaida asiatica
- Amphispiza bilineata
- Cardinalis cardinalis
- Haemorhous mexicanus

==== Reptiles ====
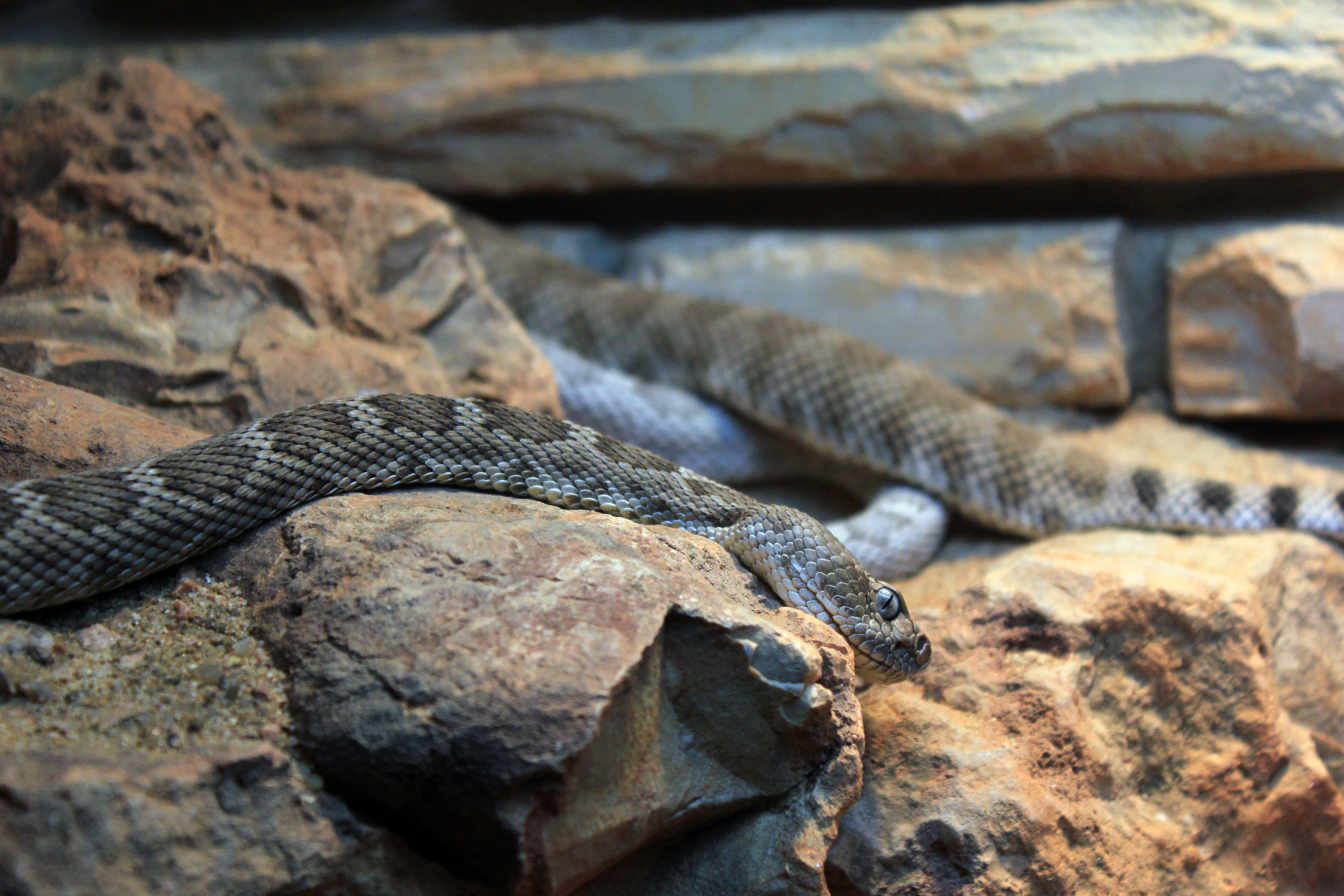
Crotalus catalinensis

Isla Catalana has 10 species of reptiles, including the following seven endemic species.

- Aspidoscelis catalinensis (Isla Santa Catalina whiptail)
- Crotalus catalinensis (Santa Catalina Island rattlesnake)
- Dipsosaurus catalinensis (Isla Santa Catalina desert iguana)
- Lampropeltis catalinensis (Isla Santa Catalina kingsnake)
- Phyllodactylus bugastrolepis (Santa Catalina Island leaf-toed gecko)
- Sceloporus lineatulus (Isla Santa Catalina spiny lizard)
- Uta squamata (Isla Santa Catalina side-blotched lizard)

== See also ==
- Nicolás de Cardona
- Tomás de Cardona
