= Isla del Carmen (Baja California) =

Island in Mexico

Isla Carmen
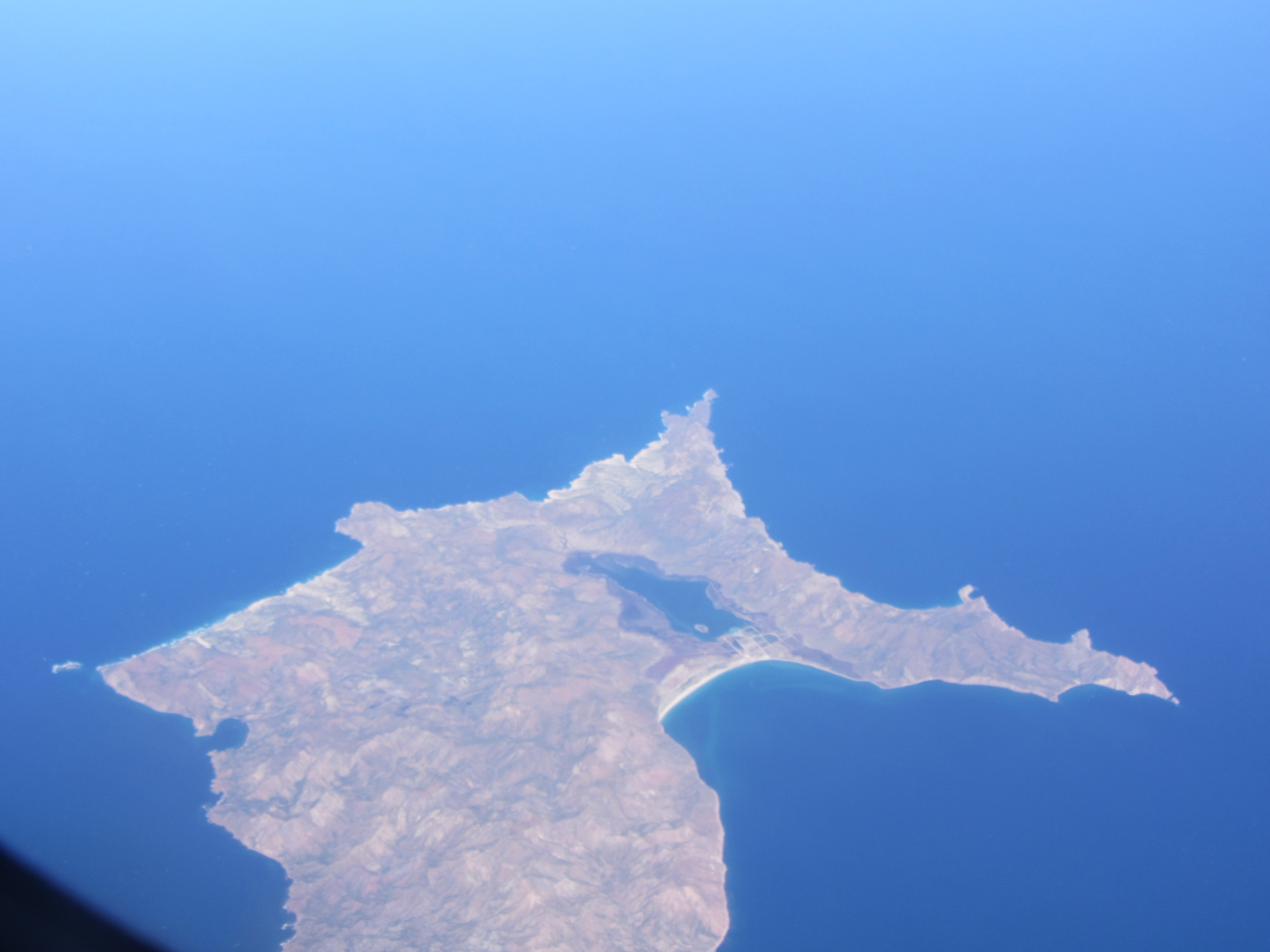
- Aerial view of part of Isla del Carmen

- Location within Mexico

Geography
- Location: Gulf of California; Loreto Municipality
- Coordinates: 25°58′39.2″N 111°09′14.23″W

Administration
- Mexico
- State: Baja California Sur

Demographics
- Population: Uninhabited

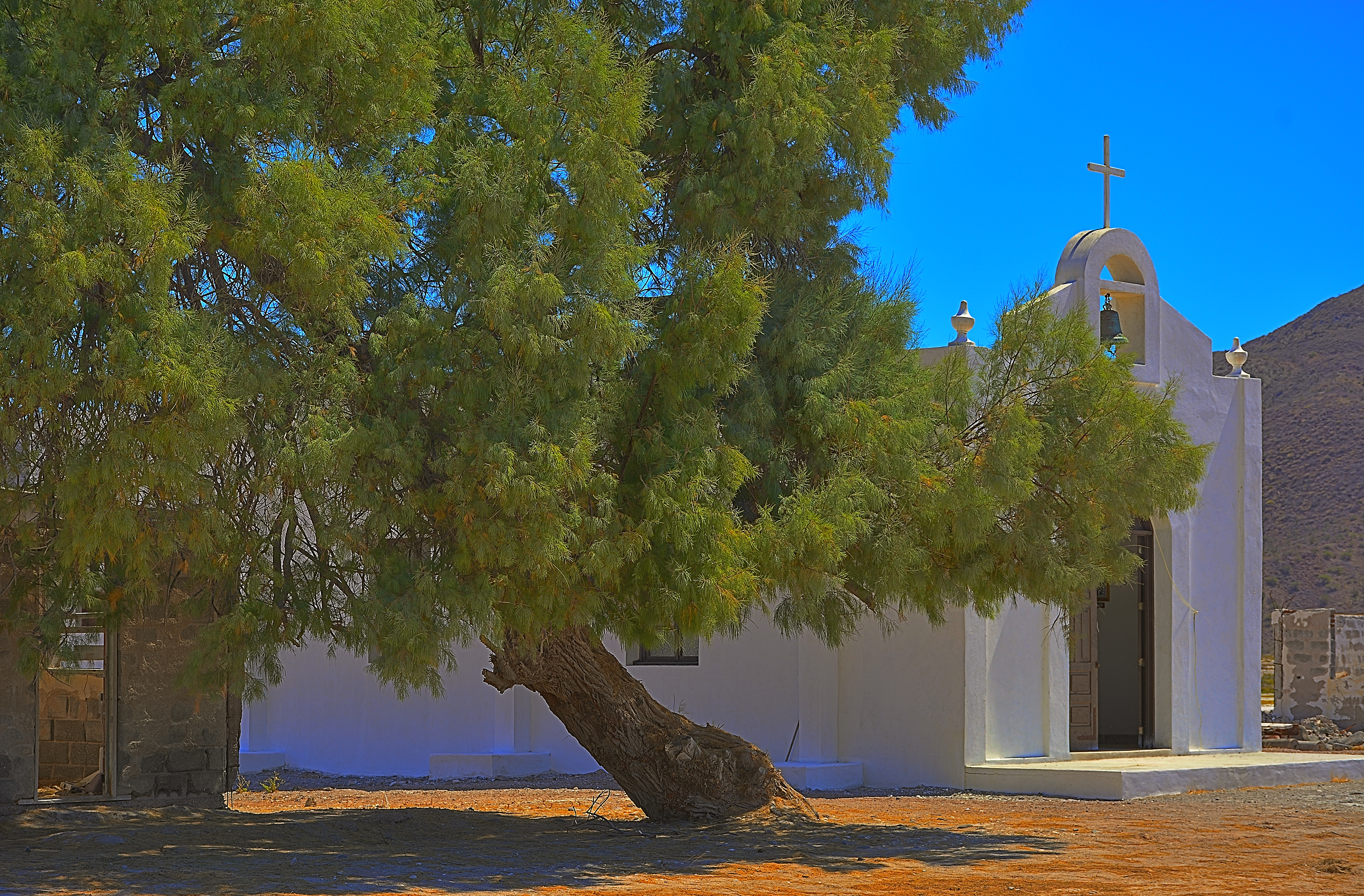
Isla del Carmen chapel

Isla del Carmen is an island of 15,000 hectares (37,000 acres), located in the Gulf of California, in Loreto Municipality in the eastern portion of the state of Baja California Sur, Mexico. The island is protected within Loreto Bay National Park which is within the UNESCO "Islands and Protected Areas of the Gulf of California" Mexican World Heritage Site.

== History ==
The tidal bay on the north east end of the island was the site of a salt mining facility run by the company Salinas del Pacifico SA de CV. The submerged remnants of a loading dock are still present off shore of the bay. The island became part of the newly created Bahía de Loreto National Park in the 1970s.

== Environment ==
=== Climate ===
The island has a desert climate similar to that of the Sonoran desert.

=== Conservation ===
Efforts to protect the island began in 1996 when the Vida Silvestre Organization, AC and Salinas del Pacifico SA de CV began a partnership to protect the native flora and fauna. Isla del Carmen supports many bird species, such as the brown pelican (Pelecanus occidentalis), the scissor-tailed flycatcher, magnificent frigatebird (Fregata magnificent) and the blue-footed booby (Sula nebouxii) as well as various reptiles and rodent mammals. The island provides nesting sites for seabirds such as the yellow-footed gull (Larus livens), the osprey (Pandion haliaetus) and the American oystercatcher (Haematopus palliatus).

A program to reestablish the once native Big Horn Sheep population on the island began in 1995.
