= Tomás de Cardona =

17th-century Venetian business entrepreneur

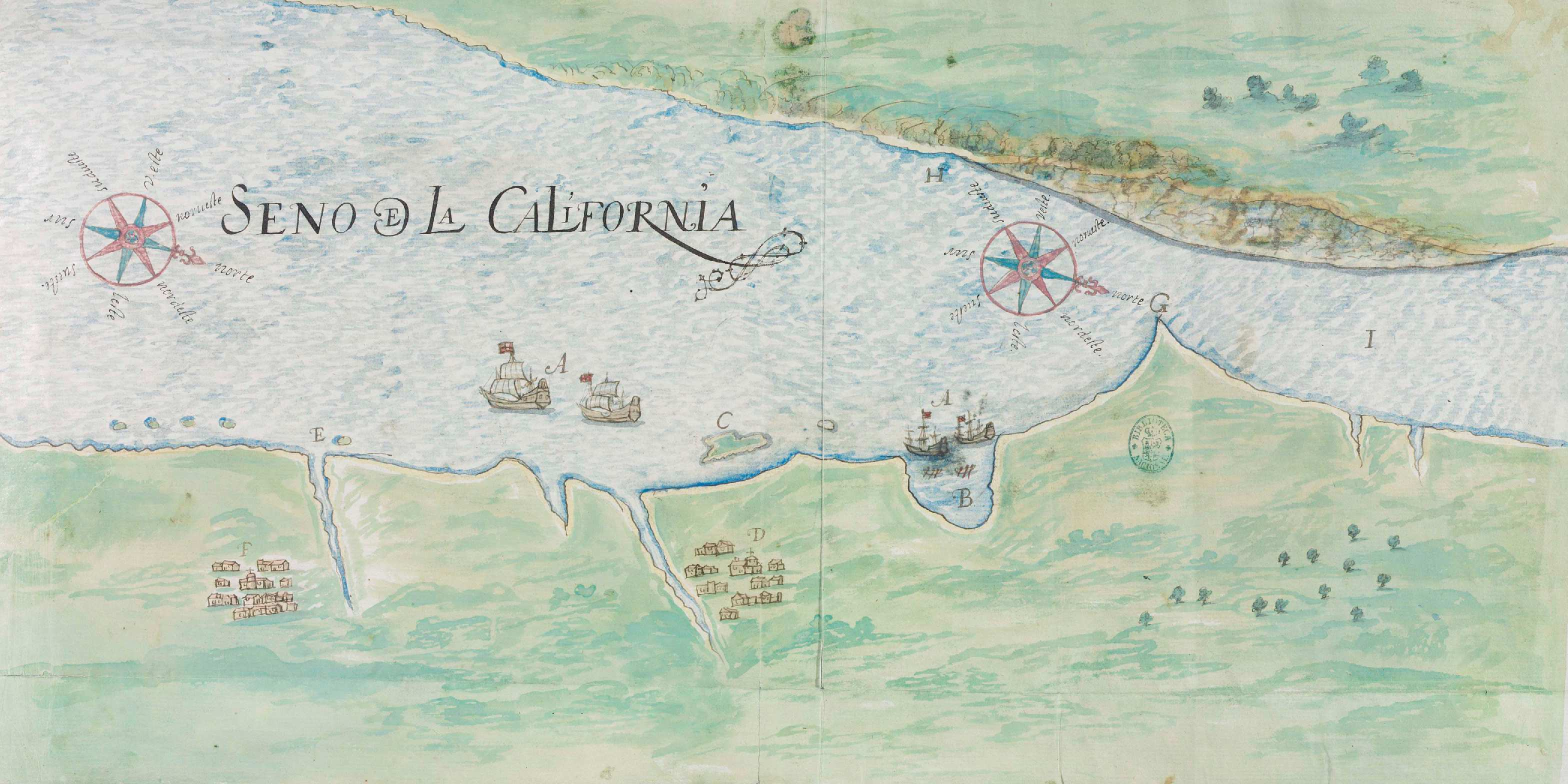
Map of the Gulf of California included by Nicolás de Cardona, 1632 nephew of Tomás de Cardona, in his report on the trip to the Kingdom of California.

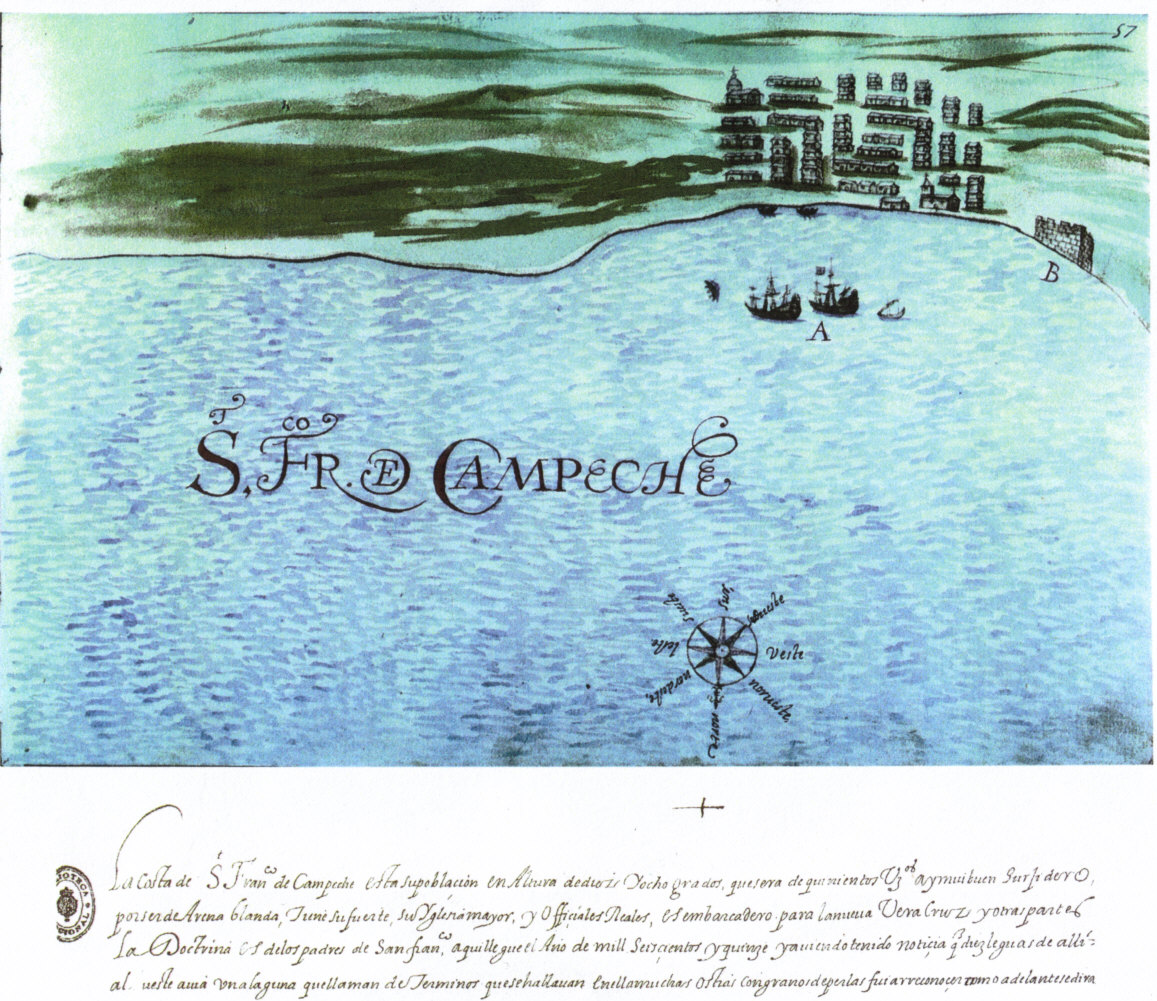
Original Chart of San Francisco de Campeche by Nicolás de Cardona, 17th century, towards 1620. From Archivo de Indias, Seville Spain.

Tomás de Cardona, a native of Venice who lived in Seville during the 17th century, was a business entrepreneur and a favorite at the Spanish royal court. With his partners Sancho de Meras and Francisco de la Paraya, he invested in a company formed to exploit the pearl fisheries in California.

== Exploration and enterprise ==
=== Encomienda from Phillip III for the enterprise ===
Cardona, Merás and Paraya, all of whom were residents of Seville, petitioned the Spanish Crown for permission to voyage to the pearl fisheries of California and harvest pearl oysters using their vessels and certain implements in their possession they claimed would enable them to collect pearl oysters from depths of twenty-five to fifty fathoms, i.e., 150–300 feet (46–91 m). In 1611 Tomás de Cardona was granted an "encomienda" from Philip III of Spain to create a company to exploit California's pearl fishery. In 1612 he signed an agreement with the viceroy to find pearl fisheries, look for General Luis Fernandez de Cordoba's lost galleons, and explore California.

=== Beginning of operations and crew ===
The Cardona company did not begin operations until 1613. Six vessels were built at Moguer, and outfitted at considerable expense. By the summer of 1613 they were ready to set sail for the New World. None of the three investors accompanied the expedition, which was commanded by Francisco Basilio. The second officer in command was Nicolás de Cardona, Tomás de Cardona's nephew. They set sail from Cádiz at the mouth of the Guadalquivir in July 1613, accompanying General Antonio de Oquendo's fleet.

=== Voyage ===
After their transatlantic crossing they sailed among the Caribbean islands, searching for placeres (oyster beds) of pearl oysters. According to historian Sanford A. Mosk, Basilio and Cardona apparently made this voyage among the Caribbean islands and along the "Pearl Coast" (eastern Venezuela and its offshore islands) to acquire Negro divers. A royal decree of 25 June 1585 had proscribed the employment of Amerindians in pearl fishing, and declared that black divers were to be employed in that occupation. The decree was not enforced, but blacks were considered to be better for that purpose. At Margarita, the entrepreneurs desired a contract with Basilio to use his vessels and instruments in exploiting the placeres under their control; their own divers were unable to descend more than twelve fathoms or 72 feet (22 m). Basilio refused their proposition, but the Spanish officials at Margarita ordered him to enter into the contract. Consequently the vessels went to the placeres, but the expedition yielded no pearls.

From Margarita the company sailed to Vera Cruz, arriving there some time during 1614; while plans were being made for operations in the Gulf of California, Basilio died. Nicolás de Cardona was appointed captain to replace him, with Juan de Iturbe and Pedro Alvarez de Rosales being given joint command with him. The same year, the company crossed New Spain by land and made their headquarters at Acapulco, where construction of three ships began immediately. By January 1615, three frigates, San Francisco, San Antonio, and San Diego were built and equipped for the voyage to California, at a cost of more than 45,000 pesos. Iturbe's company of men included a number of soldiers from Mexico City. Before he could set out, reports reached Acapulco that Dutch corsairs had entered the South Sea through the Straits of Magellan and were headed for New Spain after raiding the coast of Peru. The alcalde mayor ordered Iturbe to delay his departure, and impressed his company into service to ready the port for defending it against the corsairs, a task that took more than two months. Although engaged in a service for the Crown, Iturbe was forced to pay his men out of company funds during this period. The work was finished at the end of March and the three ships set sail for California with Iturbe in command.

=== A teacher in the court of Spain and accounting failure ===
Tomás de Cardona succeeded Francisco Velázquez Guillamas on 31 December 1622 as a teacher of chamber of the court. In 1633 Felipe IV of Spain issued a decree forcing treasurers of the houses of the king and queen to present its accounts to the Royal accountancy. In March 1634, the Royal accountancy demanded Tomás Cardona, chamber master and captain, to submit his accounts for the period 1629-1633. Cardona could not accomplish it until autumn of that year, being in a bad position until then.

== See also ==
- Bartolomé Ferrer
- Nicolás de Cardona
