= Sceloporus lineatulus =

Conservation status
- Least Concern (IUCN 3.1)

Scientific classification
- Domain: Eukaryota
- Kingdom: Animalia
- Phylum: Chordata
- Class: Reptilia
- Order: Squamata
- Suborder: Iguania
- Family: Phrynosomatidae
- Genus: Sceloporus
- Species: S. lineatulus

Binomial name
- Sceloporus lineatulus Dickerson, 1919

Species of lizard

Sceloporus lineatulus, the Santa Catalina spiny lizard, is a species of lizard in the family Phrynosomatidae. It is endemic to Isla Santa Catalina in Mexico.
