= Nicolás de Cardona =

Spanish entrepreneur and adventurer

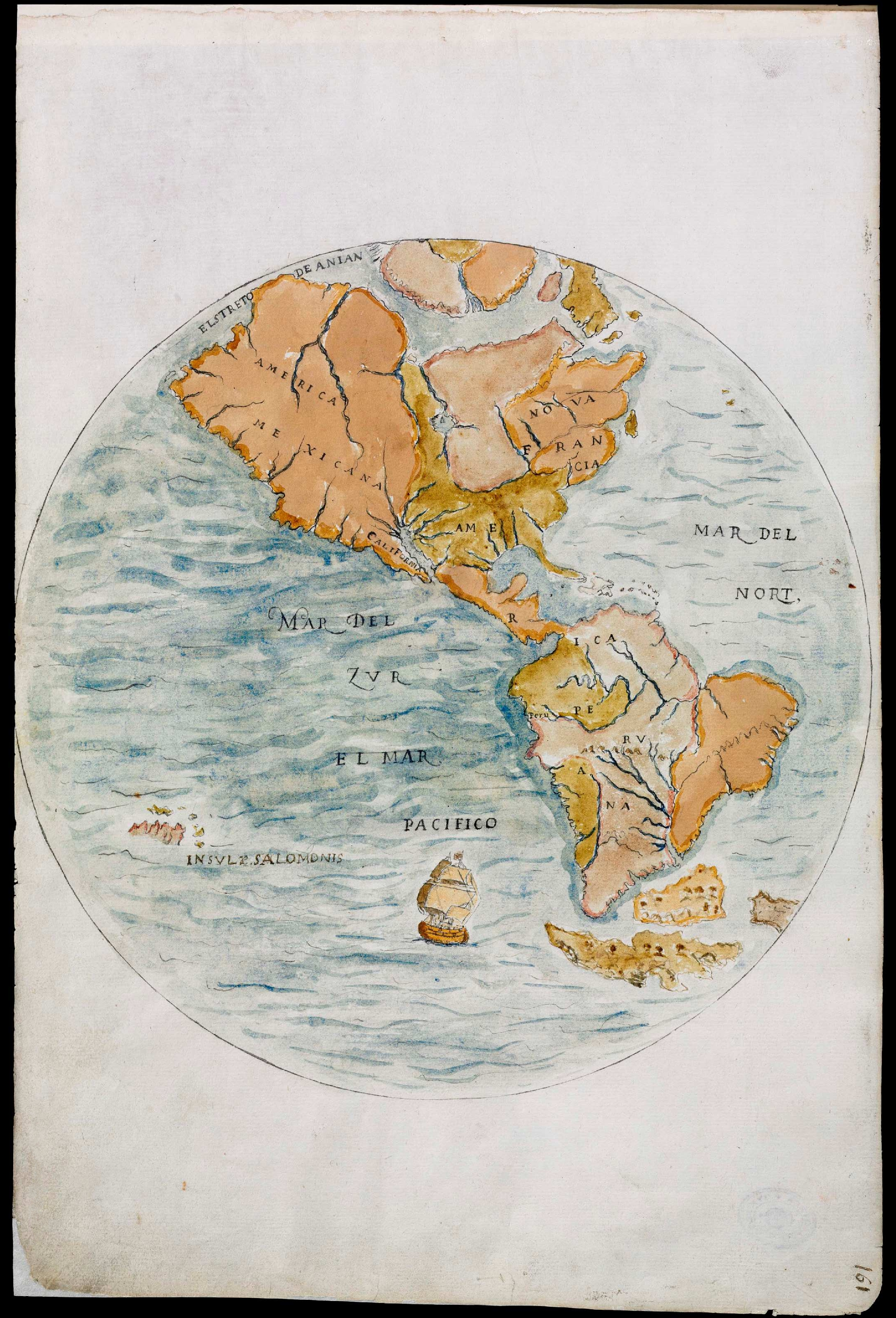
World map included by Nicolás de Cardona in his report about the trip to the Kingdom of California. It shows California as an island.

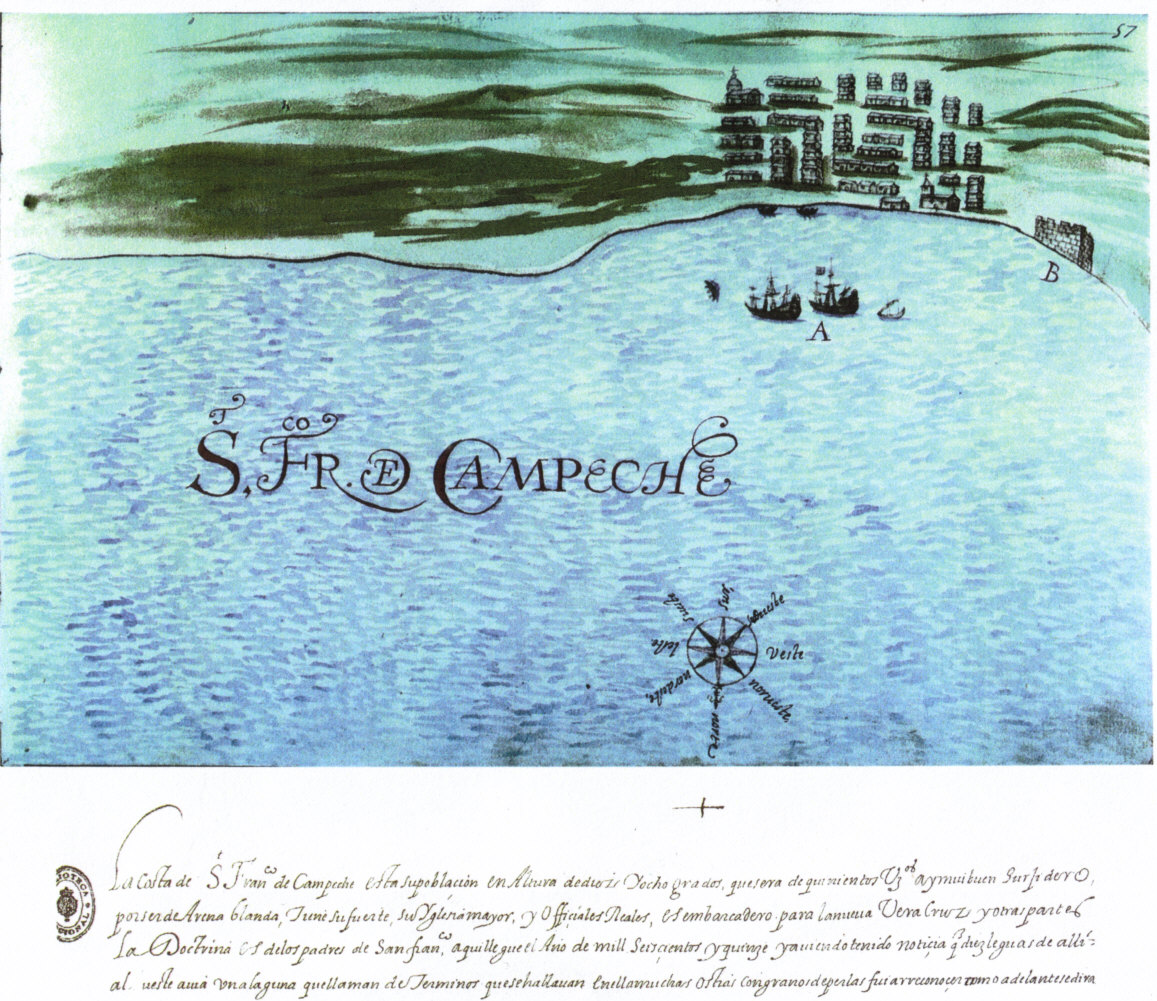
Original Chart of San Francisco de Campeche by Nicolás de Cardona, 17th century, towards 1620. From Archivo de Indias, Seville Spain.

Nicolás de Cardona was a Spanish entrepreneur and adventurer with residence in Seville, who was involved in the exploration of the Western coast of the North American continent.

== Biography ==
In 1610, Nicolas sailed from Spain to the Americas, as a captain in the fleet of General Juan Gutiérrez de Garibay. Nicolas commanded six ships together with Captain Francisco Basilio.

On 13 August 1611 a concession for the exploitation of pearl fishing along the California coast, previously held unsuccessfully by Sebastián Vizcaíno, was given to Tomás de Cardona (the uncle of Nicolás), Sancho de Merás, and Francisco de la Paraya, all Sevillans.

Nicolas was put in charge of the exploration. He went to Acapulco end of 1614 and built three frigates there, the San Antonio, San Francisco and San Diego.

During the following years, Nicolas attempted in vain to establish a pearl business, and fought against Dutch intrusions by Joris van Spilbergen.

Ruined, Nicolas went back to Spain to obtain more funds, and once again set to develop the pearling business, receiving Royal Orders in May 1618.

He finally returned to Spain in 1623, where he published in 1624 his Hydrographic and Geographic Descriptions of Many northern and Southern Lands and Seas in the Indies, Specifically of the Discovery of the Kingdom of California.

== See also ==
- Bartolomé Ferrer
- Tomás de Cardona
