= Isla Monserrate =

Island in the Gulf of California

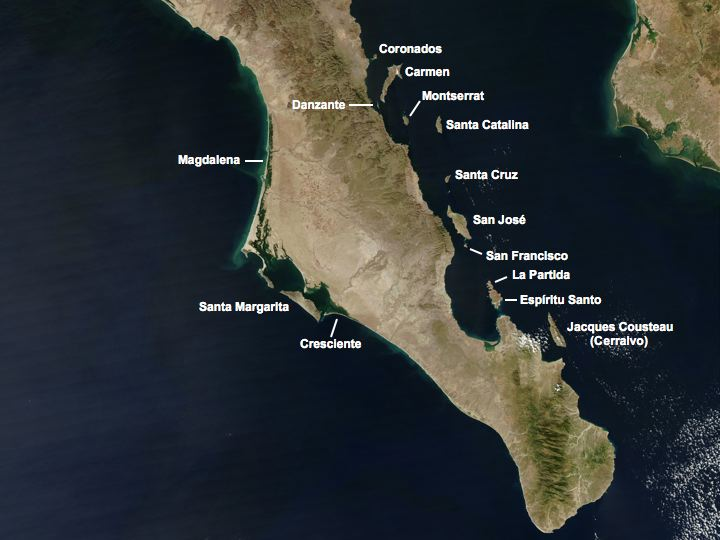
- Isla Monserrate (Montserrat, north-east)

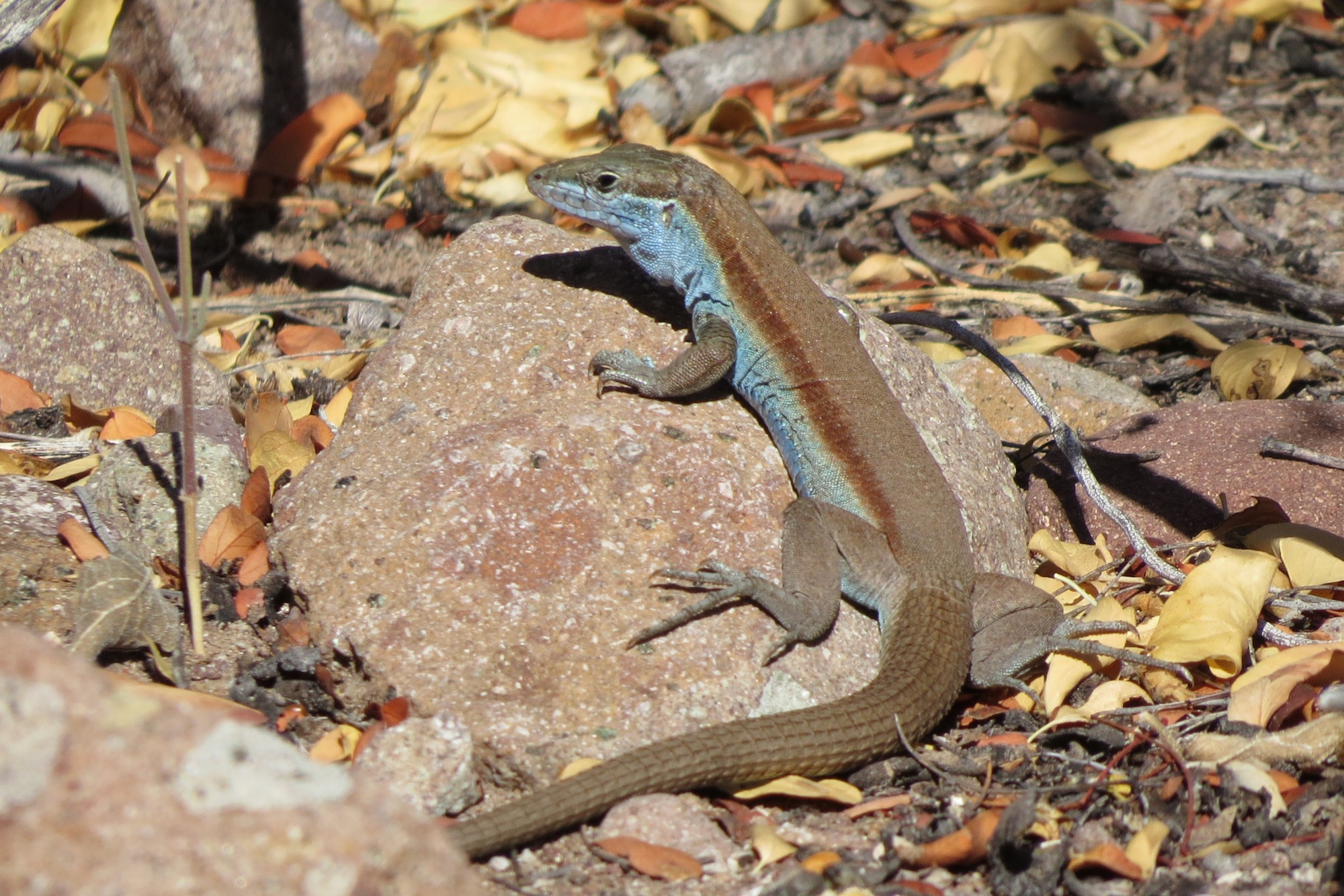
- Aspidoscelis pictus in Isla Monserrate

- Location within Mexico

Geography
- Location: Gulf of California
- Coordinates: 25°41′0.93″N 111°01′54.07″W
- Highest elevation: 200 m (700 ft)

Administration
- Mexico
- State: Baja California Sur

Demographics
- Population: Uninhabited

Isla Monserrate, is an island in the Gulf of California east of the Baja California Peninsula. The island is uninhabited and is part of the Loreto Municipality.

== Biology ==
Isla Monserrate has 13 species of reptiles, including the endemic Isla Monserrate whiptail (Aspidoscelis pictus).
