= Isla Santa Cruz (Baja California Sur) =

Island in the Gulf of California

- Location within Mexico

Geography
- Location: Gulf of California, Loreto Municipality
- Coordinates: 25°17′13.37″N 110°43′7.60″W
- Highest elevation: 494 m (1621 ft)

Administration
- Mexico
- State: Baja California Sur

Demographics
- Population: Uninhabited

Isla Santa Cruz, is an island in the Gulf of California, east of the Baja California Peninsula in Baja California Sur state.

The island is uninhabited and is within Loreto Municipality.

== Biology ==
Isla Santa Cruz has six species of reptiles: Crotalus atrox (western diamond-backed rattlesnake), Lampropeltis californiae (California kingsnake), Phyllodactylus nocticolus (peninsular leaf-toed gecko), Rena humilis (western threadsnake), Sauromalus ater (common chuckwalla), and Sceloporus angustus (Isla Santa Cruz sator).
