= Isla San Diego =

Island in the Gulf of California

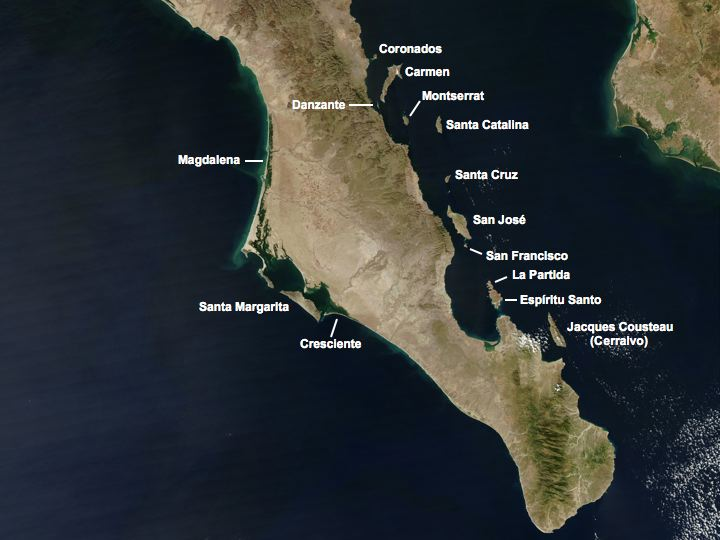
- Isla San Diego is north of Isla San José
- Interactive map of Isla San Diego

Geography
- Location: Baja California Sur
- Coordinates: 25°12′01″N 110°41′53″W
- Adjacent to: Gulf of California
- Area: 0.563 km^{2} (0.217 sq mi)
- Length: 1.5 km (0.93 mi)
- Width: 500 m (1600 ft)

Administration
- Mexico

Demographics
- Population: Uninhabited

Isla San Diego is a small island in Mexico in the southern Gulf of California. Administratively it belongs to the municipality of Comondú of the State of Baja California Sur and is very close to the small island called Isla La Habana.

It is barren and uninhabited, is located about 22 km (13.7 mi) east of the coast of Baja California, 9.5 km (5.9 mi) north of San Jose Island and 6 km (3.7 mi) south-southeast of the island of Santa Cruz. Isla San Diego is 1.5 km (0.93 mi) long, up to 500 m (546.8 yd) wide and has an area of 0.563 km^{2} (139.1 acres).

== See also ==
- Geography of Baja California Sur
