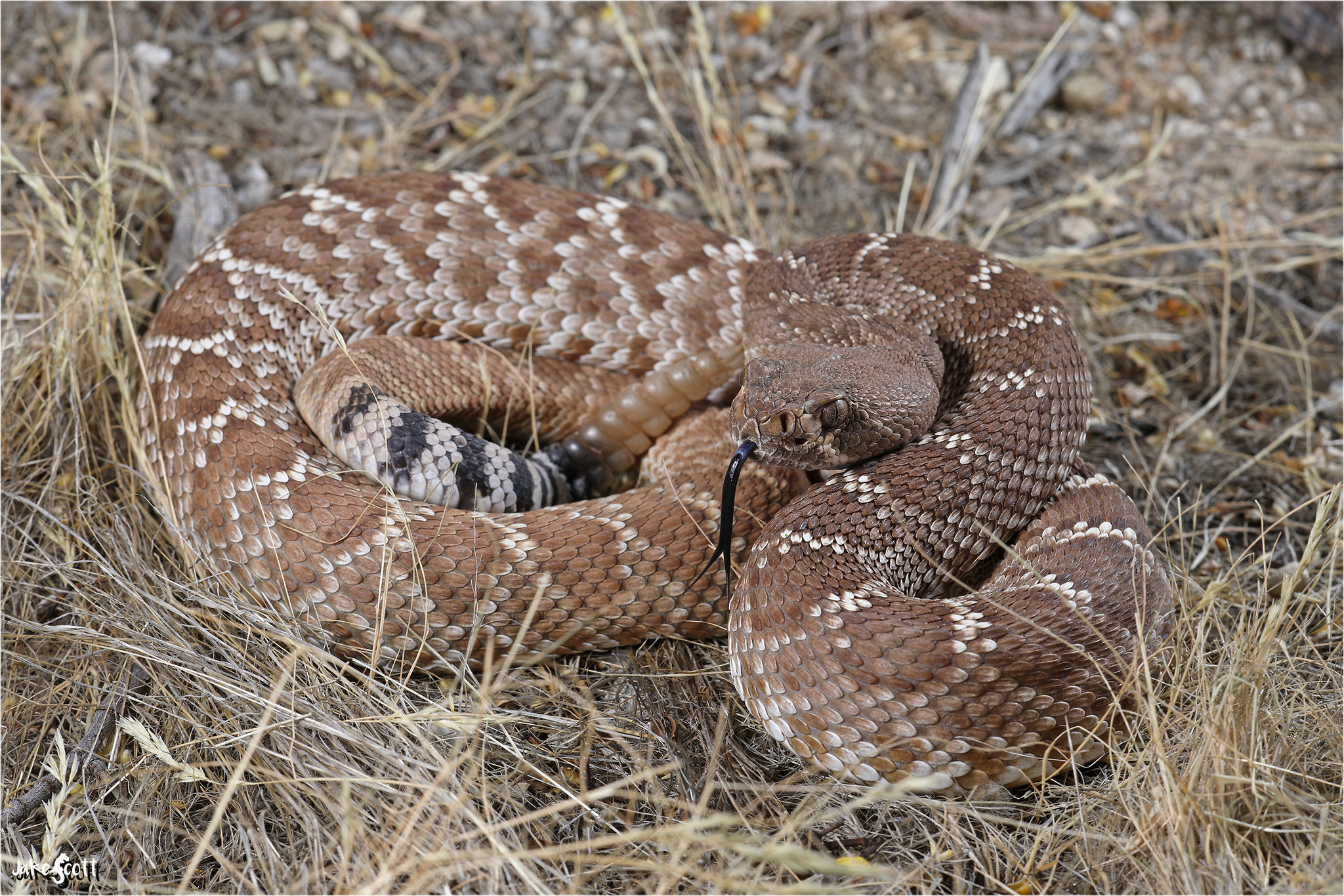

Conservation status
- Near Threatened (IUCN 3.1)

Scientific classification
- Kingdom: Animalia
- Phylum: Chordata
- Class: Reptilia
- Order: Squamata
- Suborder: Serpentes
- Family: Viperidae
- Genus: Crotalus
- Species: C. ruber

Binomial name
- Crotalus ruber Cope, 1892
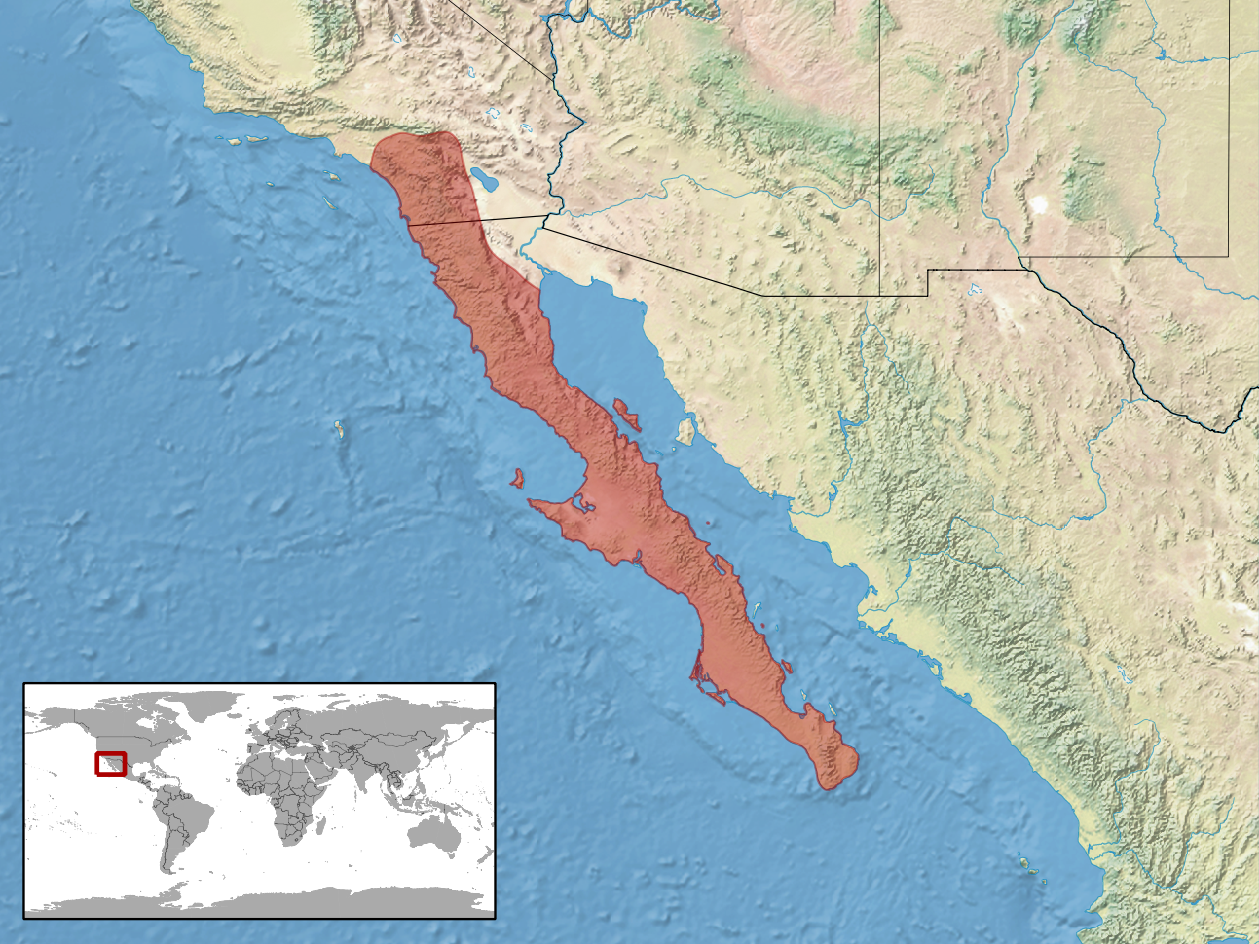

Synonyms
- List: Caudisona atrox sonoraensis - Kennicott, 1861; Crotalus adamanteus atrox - Cope, 1875; Crotalus exsul - Garman, 1884; Crotalus adamanteus ruber - Cope, 1892; Crotalus ruber - Van Denburgh, 1896; Crotalus atrox ruber - Stejneger, 1895; Crotalus exsul - Grinnell & Camp, 1917; Crotalus atrox elegans - Schmidt, 1922; Crotalus exul ruber - Kallert, 1927; Crotalus ruber ruber - Klauber, 1949; Crotalus ruber elegans - Harris & Simmons, 1978; Crotalus ruber monserratensis - Harris & Simmons, 1978; Crotalus exsul exsul - Grismer, McGuire & Hollingsworth, 1994

= Crotalus ruber =

Red diamond rattlesnake

Species of snake

Common names: red diamond rattlesnake, red rattlesnake, red diamond snake, more

Crotalus ruber is a venomous pit viper species found in southwestern California in the United States and Baja California in Mexico. Three subspecies are currently recognized, including the nominate subspecies described here.

== Common names ==
Common names include: red diamond rattlesnake, red rattlesnake, red diamond snake, red diamond-backed rattlesnake, red rattler, and western diamond rattlesnake. The form found on Cedros Island, previously described as C. exsul, was referred to as the Cedros Island diamond rattlesnake, or Cedros Island rattlesnake.

== Taxonomy ==
Not enough genetic and morphological diversity exists between C. exsul from Cedros Island and C. ruber from the mainland to warrant the recognition of both species. Since C. exsul Garman (1884) has priority over C. ruber Cope (1892), they suggested the island population be referred to as C. e. exsul and those from the mainland as C. e. ruber. In response, Smith et al. (1998) petitioned the ICZN to validate ruber over exsul in the interest of nomenclatural stability. In 2000, the ICZN published Opinion 1960 in which they ruled C. ruber should have precedence over C. exsul.

Hence, Crotalus ruber exsul, also known as the Cedros Island Rattlesnake, and native to Mexico is a subspecies of C. ruber.

== Subspecies ==
Subspecies	Taxon author	Common name	Geographic range
C. r. exsul	Garman, 1884	Cedros Island red diamond rattlesnake	Mexico, Cedros Island
C. r. lucasensis	Van Denburgh, 1920	San Lucan red diamond rattlesnake	Mexico, Cape region of lower Baja California
C. r. ruber	Cope, 1892	Red diamond rattlesnake	The United States in southwestern California, and Mexico in Baja California, except for the Cape region of lower Baja California

C. r. exsul is thought to have separated from the mainland sister subspecies of C. ruber 210 thousand years ago.

== Geographic range ==
Red diamond rattlesnakes are found in the United States in southwestern California and southward through the Baja California peninsula, although not in the desert east of the Sierra de Juárez in northeastern Baja California. It also inhabits a number of islands in the Gulf of California, including Angel de la Guarda, Pond, San Lorenzo del Sur, San Marcos, Danzante, Monserrate and San José. Off the west coast of Baja California, it is found on Isla de Santa Margarita, which is off Baja California Sur, and (as C. ruber exsul) on Isla de Cedros. Dwelling in brush covered hillsides, a favored habitat is the small caves and clefts of reddish sandstone mesas.

== Description ==
C. ruber

This moderately large species commonly exceeds 100 cm (39 in) on the mainland. Large males may exceed 140 cm (55 in), although specimens of over 150 cm (59 in) are quite rare. The largest specimen on record measured 162 cm (64 in) (Klauber, 1937).

Crotalus ruber is very similar in pattern to C. atrox, but it is distinguished by its reddish color, to which the specific name, ruber, refers. Also, the first lower labial scale on each side is transversely divided to form a pair of anterior chin shields.

The dorsal scales are usually arranged in 29 rows, but may vary from 25 to 31 rows. Ventrals range from 185 to 206.

Snakes found in coastal regions are longer on average than those found in desert regions.

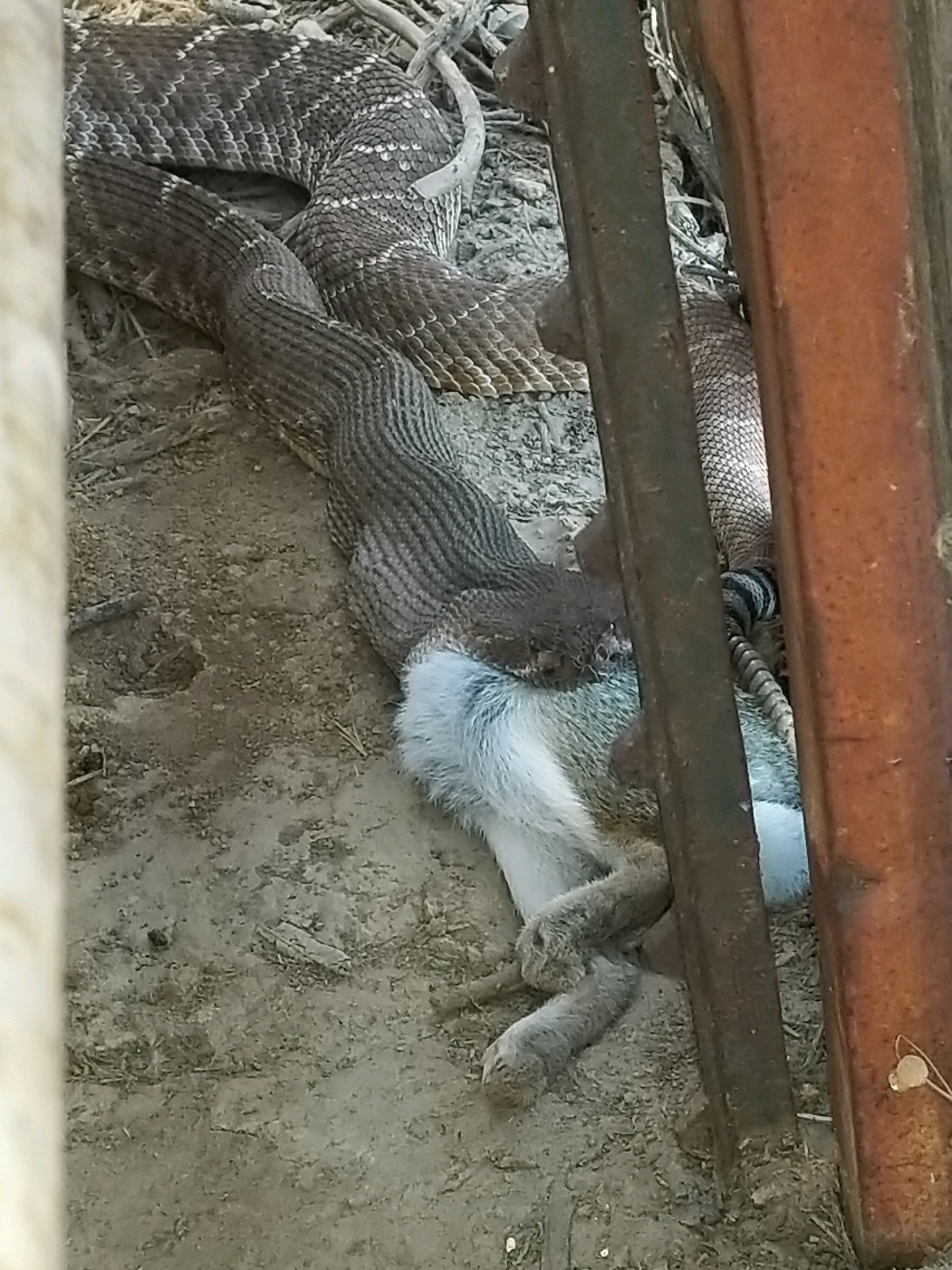
Eating a cottontail rabbit

== Habitat ==
C. ruber inhabits the cooler coastal zone, over the mountains, and into the desert beyond. It prefers the dense chaparral country of the foothills, cactus patches, and boulders covered with brush, from sea level to 1,500 m in altitude.

== Diet ==
This species preys on rabbits, ground squirrels, birds, lizards, and other snakes. Snakes from coastal populations consume prey of larger body mass than snakes from desert populations.

== Reproduction ==
Mating occurs between February and April. C. ruber is known to be ovovivparous. Females give birth in August, to between three and 20 young. Neonates are 30 to 34 cm in length.

== Venom ==
C. ruber shaking its rattle

As with all rattlesnakes, it is venomous. This species is of a mild disposition and has one of the least potent rattlesnake venoms. Nonetheless, a bite from this species is still a medical emergency and can be fatal without prompt antivenom treatment.

Brown (1973) lists an average venom yield of 364 mg (dried) and LD_{50} values of 4.0, 3.7 mg/kg IV, 6.0, 7.0, 6.7 mg/kg IP and 21.2 mg/kg SC for toxicity.

However, Norris (2004) warned this species has a relatively large venom yield containing high levels of proteolytic enzymes, especially in the adults. A publication he mentions by Rael et al. (1986) showed it contains at least three proteolytic hemorrhagins that degrade fibrinogen and cause myonecrosis, but no Mojave toxin. On the other hand, three specimens from Mexico studied by Glen et al. (1983) did have Mojave toxin and lacked hemorrhagic activity.

Bite symptoms include massive tissue swelling, pain, ecchymosis, hemorrhagic blebs, and necrosis. Systemic symptoms may include nausea, vomiting, coagulopathy, clinical bleeding and hemolysis.

== Conservation status ==
This species is classified as Least Concern on the IUCN Red List of Threatened Species (v3.1, 2001). Species are listed as such due to their wide distribution, presumed large population, or because they are unlikely to be declining fast enough to qualify for listing in a more threatened category. The population trend was down when assessed in 2007.
