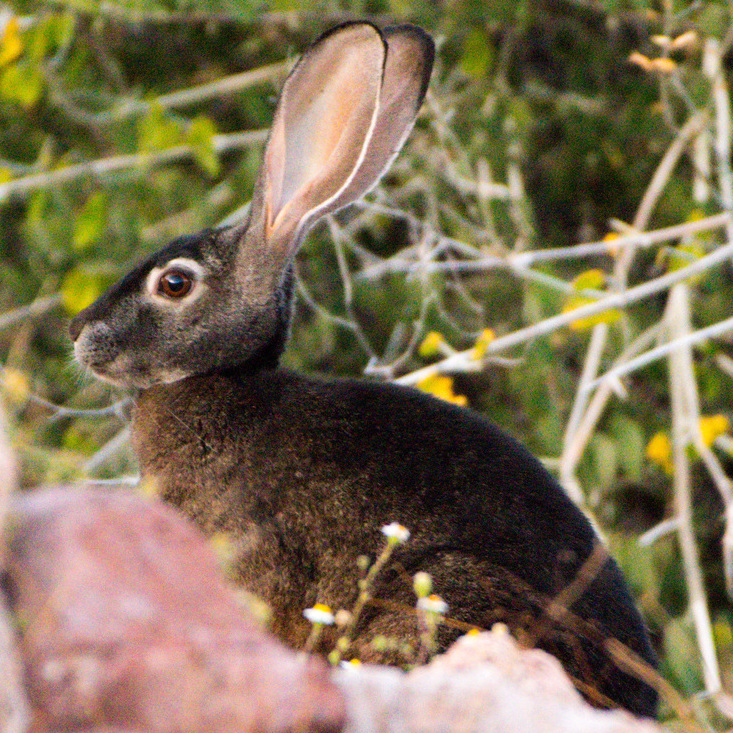

Conservation status
- Vulnerable (IUCN 3.1)

Scientific classification
- Kingdom: Animalia
- Phylum: Chordata
- Class: Mammalia
- Order: Lagomorpha
- Family: Leporidae
- Genus: Lepus
- Species: L. insularis

Binomial name
- Lepus insularis W. Bryant, 1891
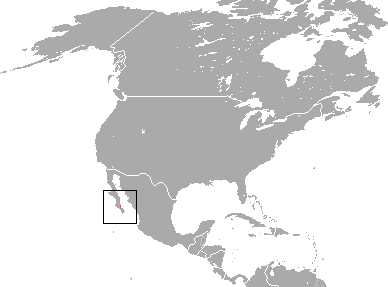
- Range of the black jackrabbit

Synonyms
- Lepus californicus insularis

= Black jackrabbit =

Species of mammal

The black jackrabbit (Lepus insularis) (Spanish: liebre negra), also known as the black hare or Espiritu Santo jackrabbit (Spanish: liebre de Espíritu Santo), is a species of hare native to Mexico. It is only known to live on the island of Espiritu Santo in the Gulf of California. The IUCN has listed the black jackrabbit as a vulnerable species because of its restricted range. It is regarded by some authorities as being a subspecies of the black-tailed jackrabbit (L. californicus), which is found on the mainland of Mexico.

== Taxonomy and etymology ==
The black jackrabbit was first described as a species in 1891 by the American naturalist Walter E. Bryant. He described the species based on two specimens retrieved from Isla Espíritu Santo in 1882 and brought to the National Museum of Natural History by the American ornithologist Lyman Belding. Bryant gave the black jackrabbit the scientific name Lepus insularis, and noted that it was similar in size to the black-tailed jackrabbit (L. californicus). Its genus name, Lepus, meant that it belonged to the hares, and its species name, insularis, is derived from the Latin word insula, meaning "pertaining to an island".

Genetic analysis performed in 2017 found that the black jackrabbit has little genetic variation when compared to the black-tailed jackrabbit. However, it can be differentiated based on karyotypes and G banding, traits that have been used to justify its status as a distinctive species. Black jackrabbits likely diverged from hare species present on the Baja California peninsula when the Isla Espíritu Santo split off from the mainland, around 11,000 years ago. Researchers have occasionally considered the black jackrabbit to be a melanistic form of the black-tailed jackrabbit. The American Society of Mammalogists considers it to be a subspecies of the black-tailed jackrabbit, while the International Union for Conservation of Nature describes it as a distinct species.

There are no known subspecies of the black jackrabbit.

== Description ==
The black jackrabbit grows to a length around 55 cm (22 in) including a tail of 9.5 cm (4 in). The top of the head, upper surface of the body, and upper side of the tail are glossy black sheened with brown. The sides of the head, body, and limbs are dark cinnamon or buffy-brown and the underparts and underside of the tail are usually some lighter shade of brown. The eyes are surrounded by a ring of grey and the insides of the ears are greyish-black and fringed with long, grey hairs.

== Habitat and ecology ==
The black jackrabbit is endemic to the Island of Espiritu Santo just off the coast of Baja California in Mexico. It is found on grassy and rocky slopes, plateaus, dunes, and valley bottoms, typically on bare slopes and among grasses, herbs, shrubs, and cacti.

The black jackrabbit is very conspicuous as its black colouring stands out against the browns, greys, and greens of its surroundings. It is closely related to the black-tailed jackrabbit on the Mexican mainland, but the latter species is exposed to terrestrial predators and does not display melanism. On the island, large predators are absent. The black jackrabbit shares its habitat with the Espíritu Santo antelope squirrel, spiny pocket mouse, cactus mouse, desert woodrat, and ring-tailed cat. Also present are several species of native lizards and snakes, as well as two predatory birds, the crested caracara and the American kestrel.

== Status ==
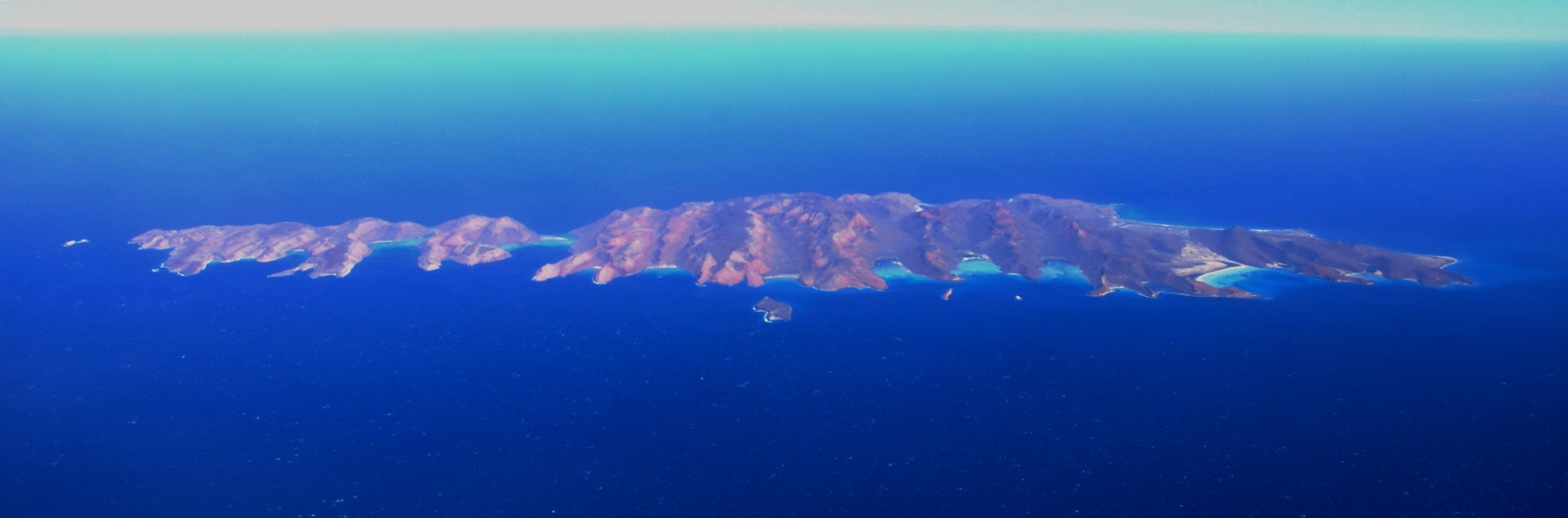
Isla Espiritu Santo and Isla Partida are connected by an isthmus.

Since the black jackrabbit is only found on the island of Espiritu Santo, its total range covers only 95 km^{2} (37 sq mi), the area of the island. However, it is common over much of the island and the population appears to be stable. The chief threats it faces are from the introduction of non-native species and the disturbance of its habitat by humans, and the IUCN has rated its conservation status as being "vulnerable". The island is uninhabited and is protected by the government of Mexico as part of the Área de Protección de Flora y Fauna: Islas del Golfo de California. It is a favoured ecotourism destination and in 1995 was declared to be part of a Biosphere Reserve, Islas del Golfo de California, by UNESCO.
