= Isla Cardonosa Este =

Island in Mexico

- Location within Baja California Location within Mexico

Geography
- Location: Gulf of California
- Coordinates: 28°53′12.60″N 113°01′44.16″W
- Highest elevation: 20 m (70 ft)

Administration
- Mexico
- State: Baja California

Demographics
- Population: uninhabited

Isla Cardonosa Este is an island in the Gulf of California east of the Baja California Peninsula. It is a satellite of Isla Partida.The island is uninhabited.

== Biology ==
Isla Cardonosa Este has three species of reptile, including Aspidoscelis tigris (Tiger Whiptail), Phyllodactylus partidus (Isla Partida Norte Leaf-Toed Gecko), and Uta stansburiana (Common Side-blotched Lizard).
