= Isla Partida (Baja California) =

- Location within Baja California Location within Mexico

Geography
- Location: Gulf of California
- Coordinates: 28°53′0″N 113°4′0″W

Administration
- Mexico
- State: Baja California

Demographics
- Population: uninhabited

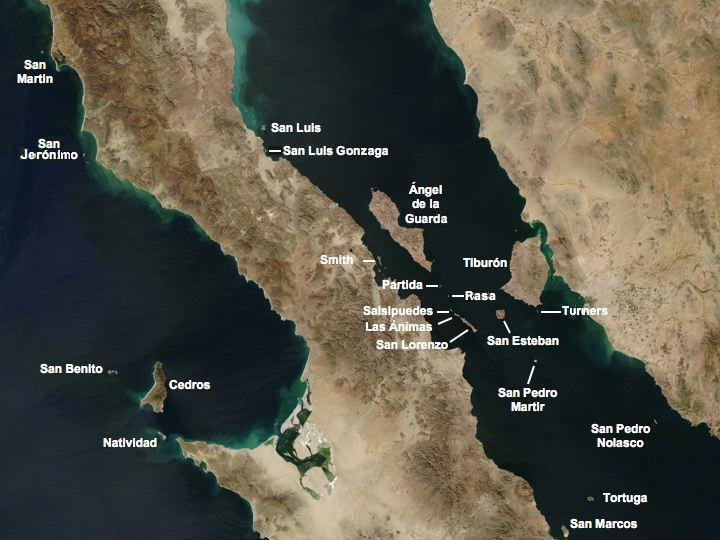
The various islands of Baja California

Isla Partida is a Mexican island of volcanic origin located in the north central part of the Gulf of California, and is a homonym of an island south of this same gulf, which is located next to Isla Espíritu Santo. It belongs to Baja California, specifically within the jurisdiction of municipality of Mexicali, although it is much closer to the coasts of the municipality of Ensenada.
