= Partida Norte leaf-toed gecko =

Conservation status
- Least Concern (IUCN 3.1)

Scientific classification
- Kingdom: Animalia
- Phylum: Chordata
- Order: Squamata
- Suborder: Gekkota
- Family: Phyllodactylidae
- Genus: Phyllodactylus
- Species: P. partidus

Binomial name
- Phyllodactylus partidus Dixon, 1966

Species of lizard

The Partida Norte leaf-toed gecko (Phyllodactylus partidus) is a species of gecko. It is endemic to Isla Partida and Isla Cardonosa Este in Mexico.
