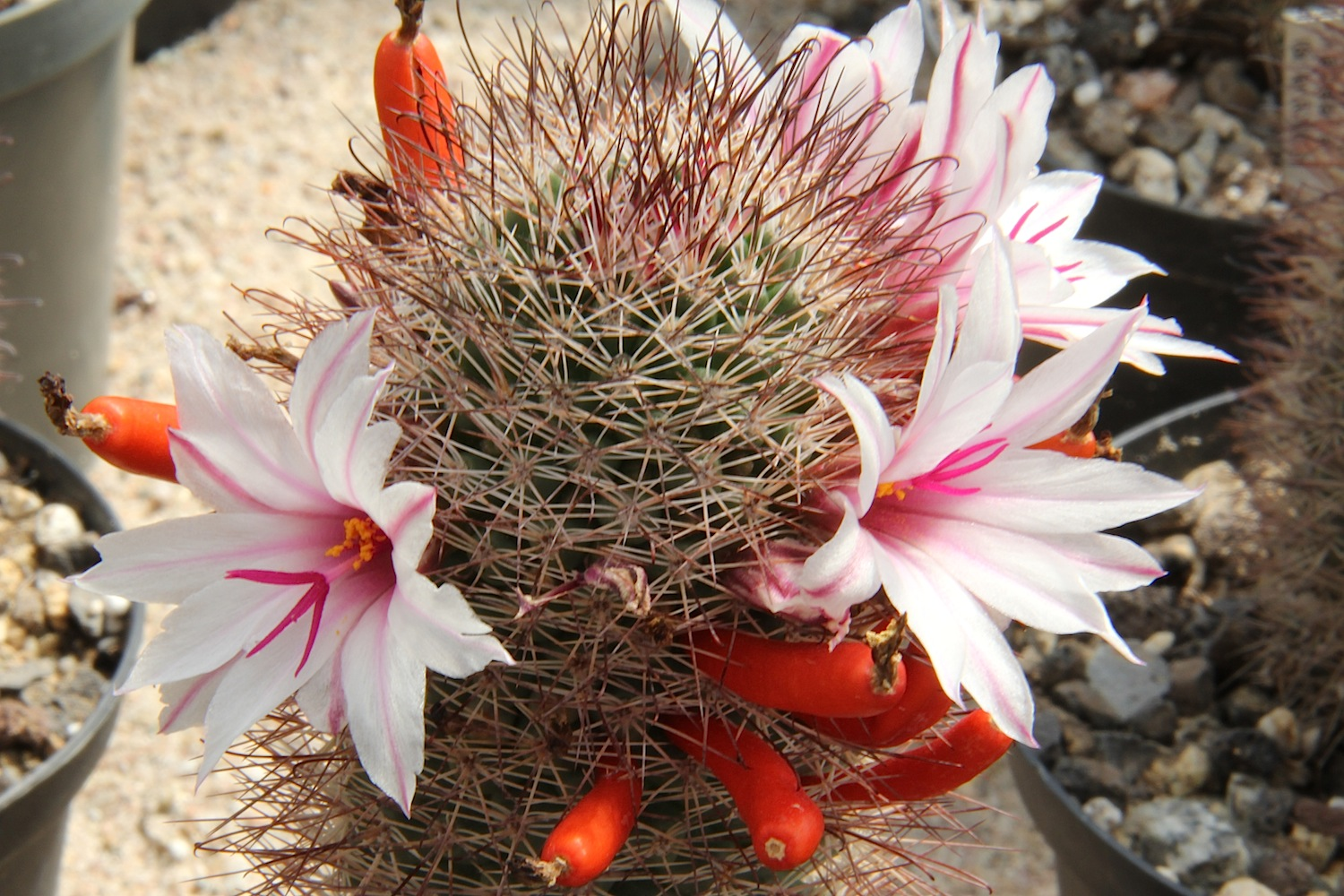
- A cultivated specimen in flower

Scientific classification
- Kingdom: Plantae
- Clade: Tracheophytes
- Clade: Angiosperms
- Clade: Eudicots
- Order: Caryophyllales
- Family: Cactaceae
- Subfamily: Cactoideae
- Genus: Cochemiea
- Species: C. fraileana

Binomial name
- Cochemiea fraileana (Britton & Rose) P.B.Breslin & Majure 2021

Synonyms
- Bartschella albicans subsp. fraileana (Britton & Rose) Doweld 2000; Chilita fraileana (Britton & Rose) Orcutt 1926; Ebnerella fraileana (Britton & Rose) Buxb. 1951; Mammillaria albicans subsp. fraileana (Britton & Rose) D.R.Hunt 1997; Mammillaria albicans f. fraileana (Britton & Rose) Lüthy 1992; Mammillaria fraileana (Britton & Rose) Boed. 1933; Neomammillaria fraileana Britton & Rose 1923

= Cochemiea fraileana =

Species of cactus

Cochemiea fraileana is a rare species of cactus in the genus Cochemiea commonly known as the Fraile nipple cactus. This species is endemic to the state of Baja California Sur in Mexico and can be found along the east coast of the southern part of the state in desert scrub communities. They tend to grow in non-calcareous dry granite-based soil but can also grow in rocky habitats, either in rock fissures or directly on top of the rock surface even without the presence of soil. Thus, the mineral composition of the rocks in their habitat directly influences their abundance. The habitat of Cochemiea fraileana is home to succulent flora and is particularly rich in local endemics. Currently, no major threats to the species are known to exist.

== Description ==
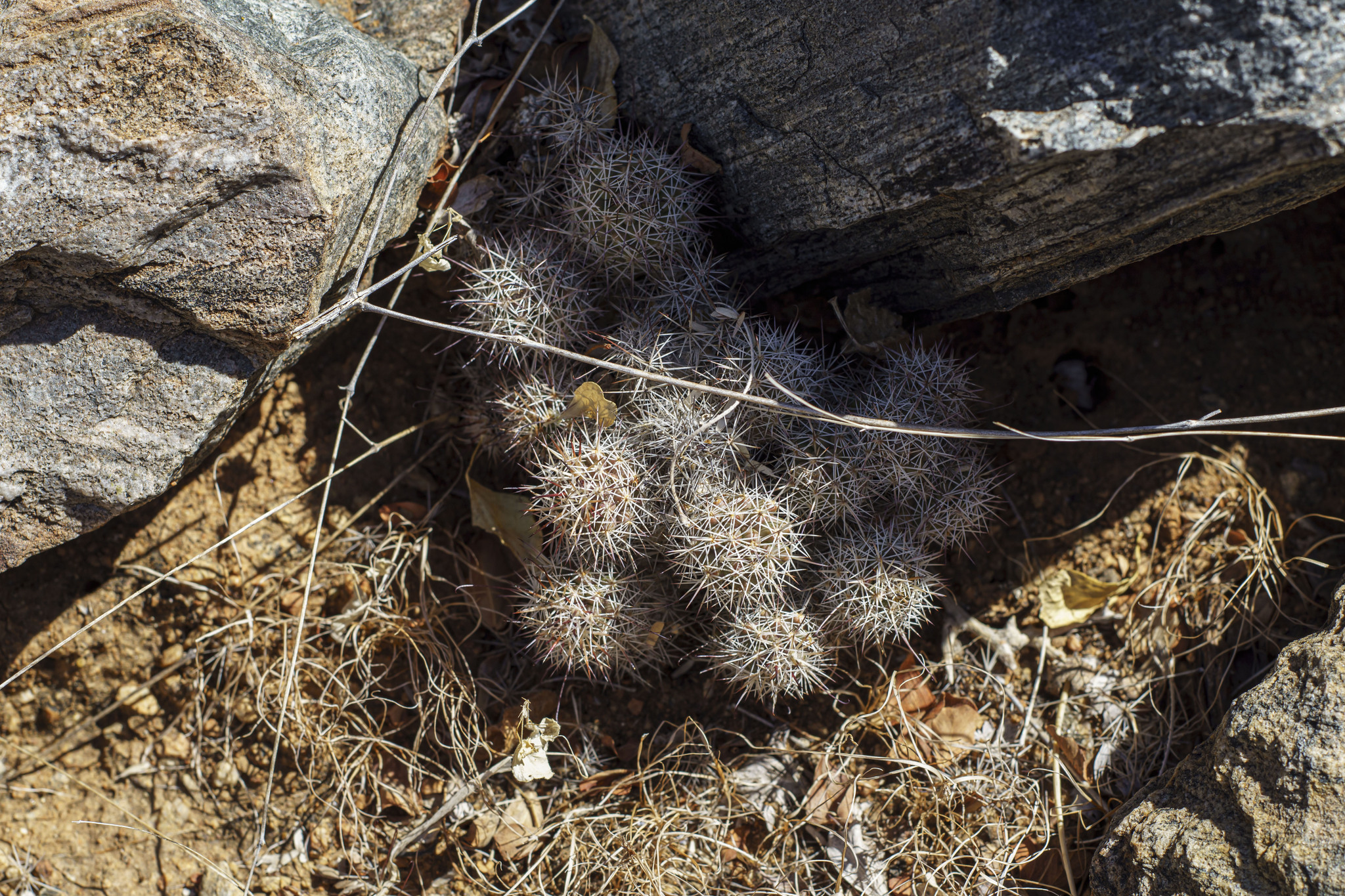
In habitat near Todos Santos

The apex bears the spine of the cactus, while the base bears flowers and fruits. Specifically, Cochemiea fraileana has its own traits. These cacti grow in slowly offsetting, irregularly forming clusters, large and small. They have cylindrical stems, usually 3–4 cm in diameter, in the clump near the base. Their body is green but can come off reddish if grown in full light. Tubercles are pyramidal without latex. Roots are fibrous. This cactus has 11 to 12 thin and white radial spines that range from 8 to 10 mm long. Their 3 to 4 central spines are dark brown and are commonly 10 mm long. Cochemiea fraileana grow light pink flowers with a darker pink median line. These flowers are 2.5 to 3 cm in diameter, and their stigma is bright pink. The fruit is red and contains small black seeds. Cochemiea fraileana commonly bloom from May to September.

== Distribution and habitat ==
Cochemiea fraileana is endemic to the state of Baja California Sur in Mexico, where it is primarily distributed throughout the coastal vicinity of La Paz and Pichilinque and on several of the islands of the Sea of Cortez, including Isla Espíritu Santo and Isla Partida.

=== Rock weathering ===
Studies have shown that Cochemiea fraileana is a pioneer cactus in rock-colonizing. These cacti grow in rocky habitats, many including rhyodacite rocks. Evidence has shown that rhyodacite is weathered to greater extents while in the presence of these cacti, which supports the argument that this species is directly associated with rock weathering and thus, the formation of soil. This small cactus does this through processes like nitrogen fixation that take place in the endophytic bacteria that lives in inside the cactus and on its roots. Studies have found large populations of culturable endophytic bacteria in stems and roots of many wild colonizing rock plants in the southern Sonoran Desert, but not in the seeds. However, there are more studies that are showing endophytic bacteria living in the fruits of some Sonoran Desert cacti.

== Cultivation ==
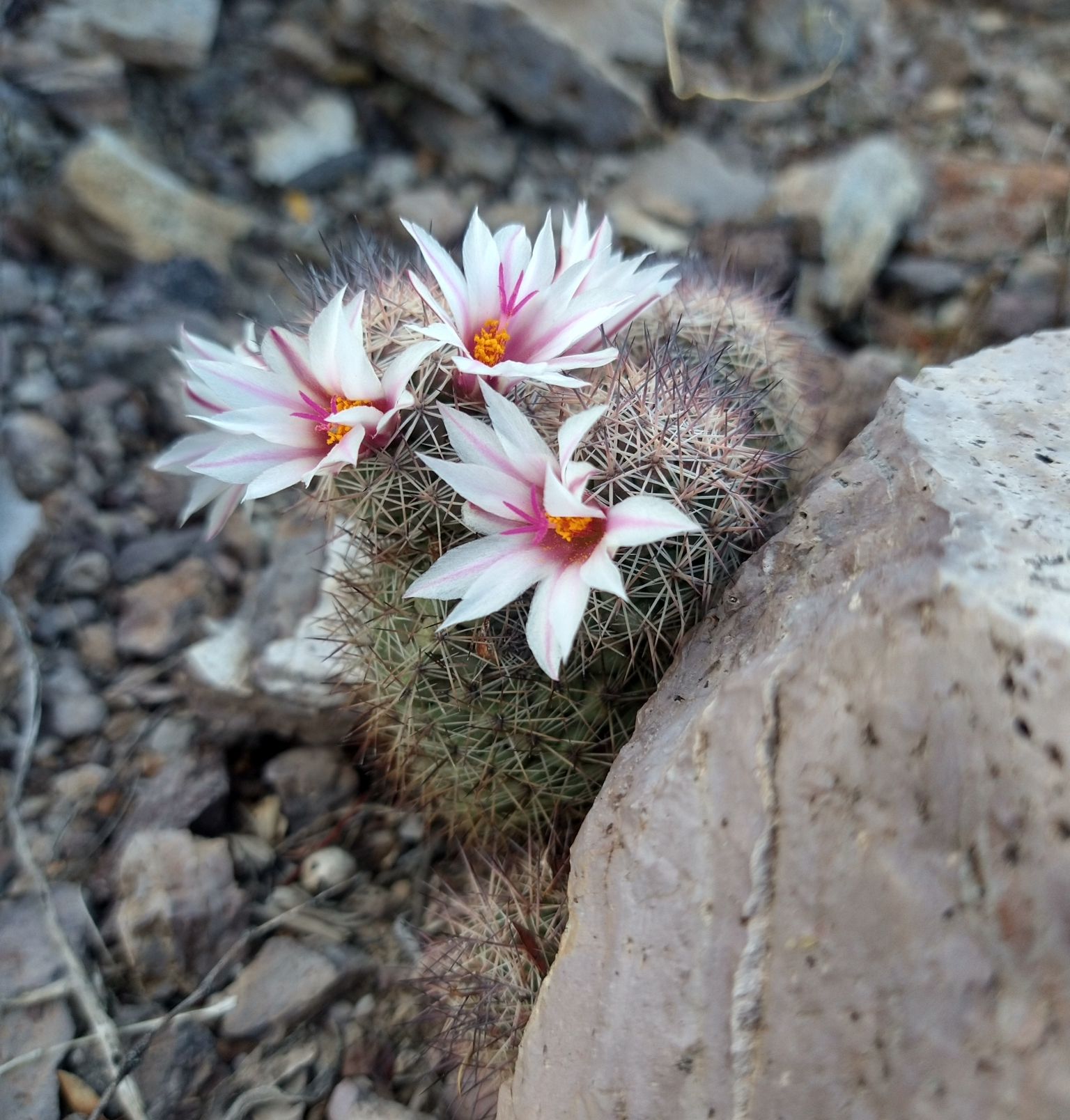
Flowering in habitat

Cochemiea fraileana is not known for being easy to cultivate, however in good conditions with ventilation it can grow easily. Since this species thrives in an arid climate, they are especially sensitive to overwatering and require open potting soil with sufficient air. The mix must be moderately acidic. Peat and other humus sources in the soil can be detrimental to growth, along with limestone. Cochemiea fraileana needs maximum sunlight to grow and achieve success in flowering, as they are used to warmer climates. Likewise, frost can harm the plant as well. Letting the plant rest in winter to shrivel, even losing up to 25% of its summer height, will help the flowering process.
