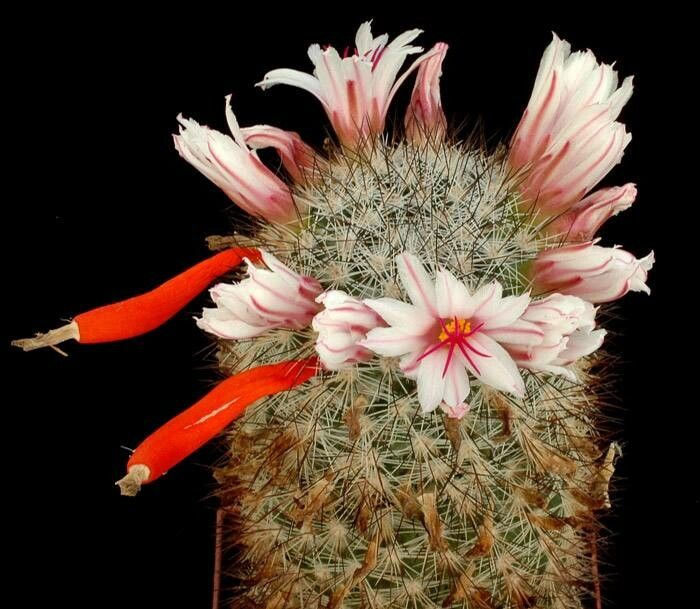

Conservation status
- Least Concern (IUCN 3.1)

Scientific classification
- Kingdom: Plantae
- Clade: Tracheophytes
- Clade: Angiosperms
- Clade: Eudicots
- Order: Caryophyllales
- Family: Cactaceae
- Subfamily: Cactoideae
- Genus: Cochemiea
- Species: C. albicans

Binomial name
- Cochemiea albicans (Britton & Rose) P.B.Breslin & Majure

Synonyms
- List: Bartschella albicans (Britton & Rose) Doweld 2000; Chilita albicans (Britton & Rose) Orcutt 1926; Mammillaria albicans (Britton & Rose) A.Berger 1929; Neomammillaria albicans Britton & Rose 1923; Chilita slevinii (Britton & Rose) Orcutt 1926; Mammillaria albicans f. dolorensis Lüthy 1992; Mammillaria albicans f. slevinii (Britton & Rose) Neutel. 1986; Mammillaria slevinii (Britton & Rose) Boed. 1933; Neomammillaria slevinii Britton & Rose 1923

= Cochemiea albicans =

Species of cactus

Cochemiea albicans is a species of Cochemiea found in Mexico.

== Description ==
Cochemiea albicans grows with basal branching and forms groups. The cylindrical, pale green plant bodies, almost entirely covered by thorns, can reach up to 20 centimeters in height and 6 centimeters in diameter. The broad, conical warts lack milky sap. The areoles are densely woolly with a few bristles. There are 4 to 8 straight central spines (sometimes one is hooked), which are 0.8 to 1 centimeter long, white with brown tips. The 14 to 21 white marginal spines are 0.5 to 0.8 centimeters long.

The broad, funnel-shaped flowers, about 2 centimeters in diameter, are white to light pink with pink central stripes. The styles, 10 to 12 millimeters long, have pink stigma lobes, and the stamens are pink with yolk-yellow anthers. The fruits are slender, club-shaped, orange to red, and 10 to 18 millimeters long. The seeds are black and balloon-shaped.

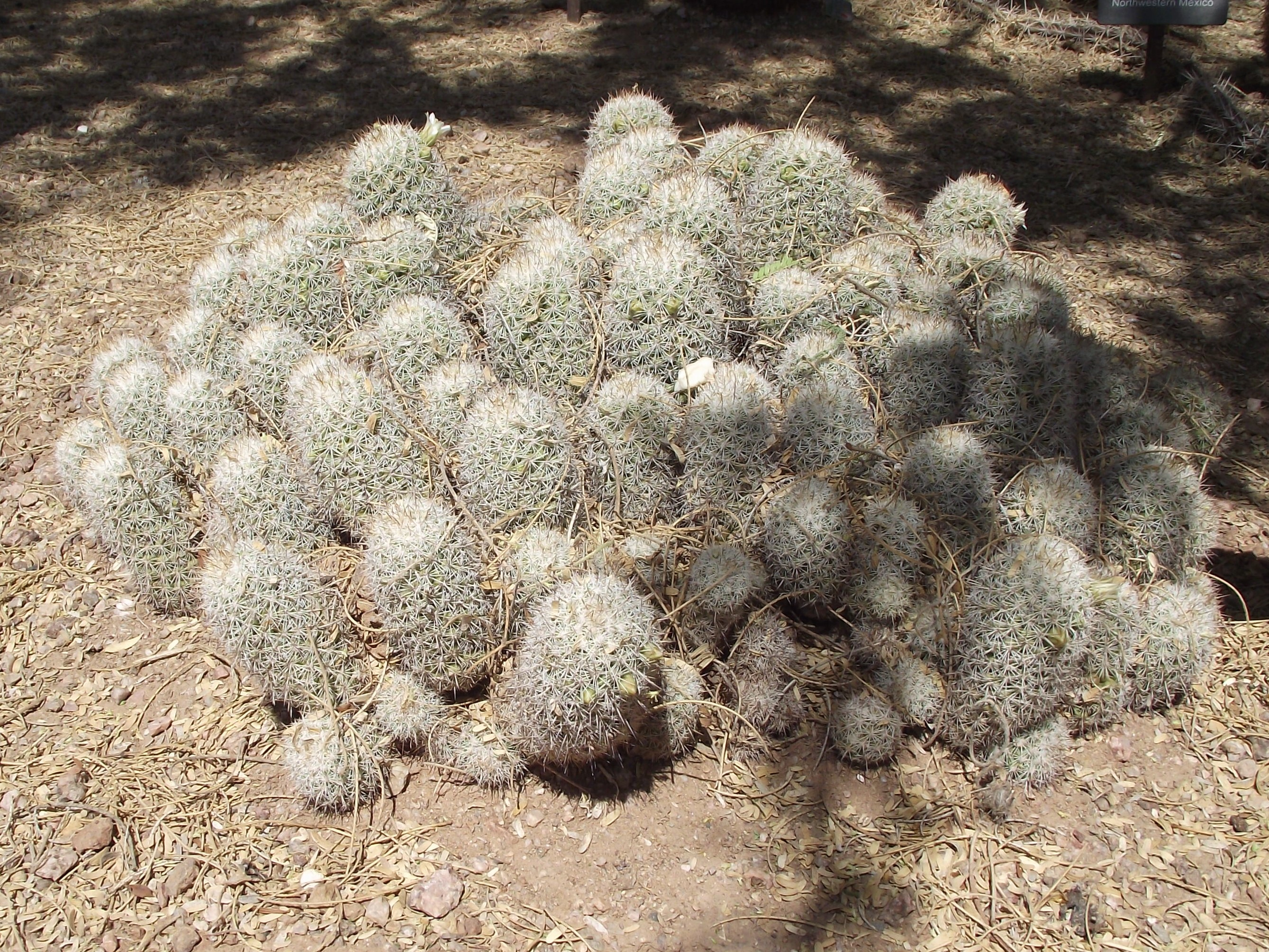
Mature plant growing in Desert Botanical Garden

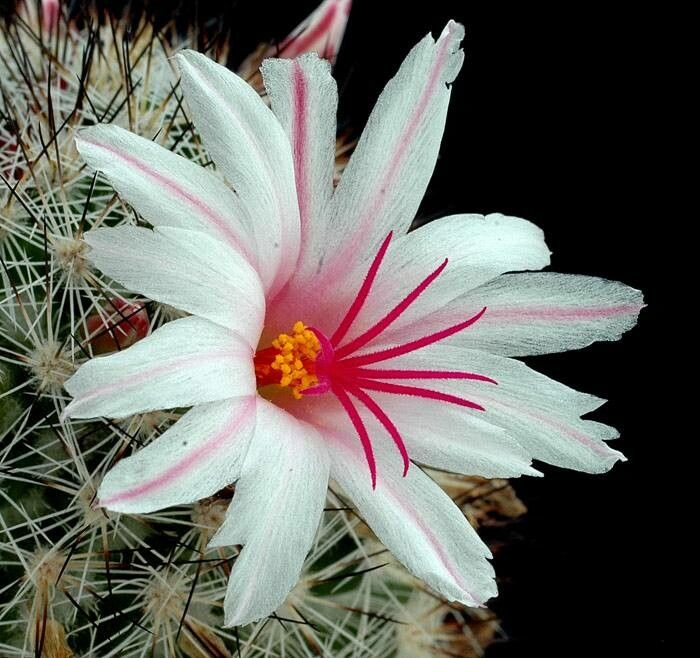
Flower

== Distribution ==
Cochemiea albicans is found in the Mexican states of Baja California and Baja California Sur, as well as on offshore islands, growing in calcareous soils and rocky hillsides at altitudes of 10 up to 200 meters. The plant grows in habitat along with Cochemiea dioica, Cochemiea fraileana, and Pachycereus pringlei.

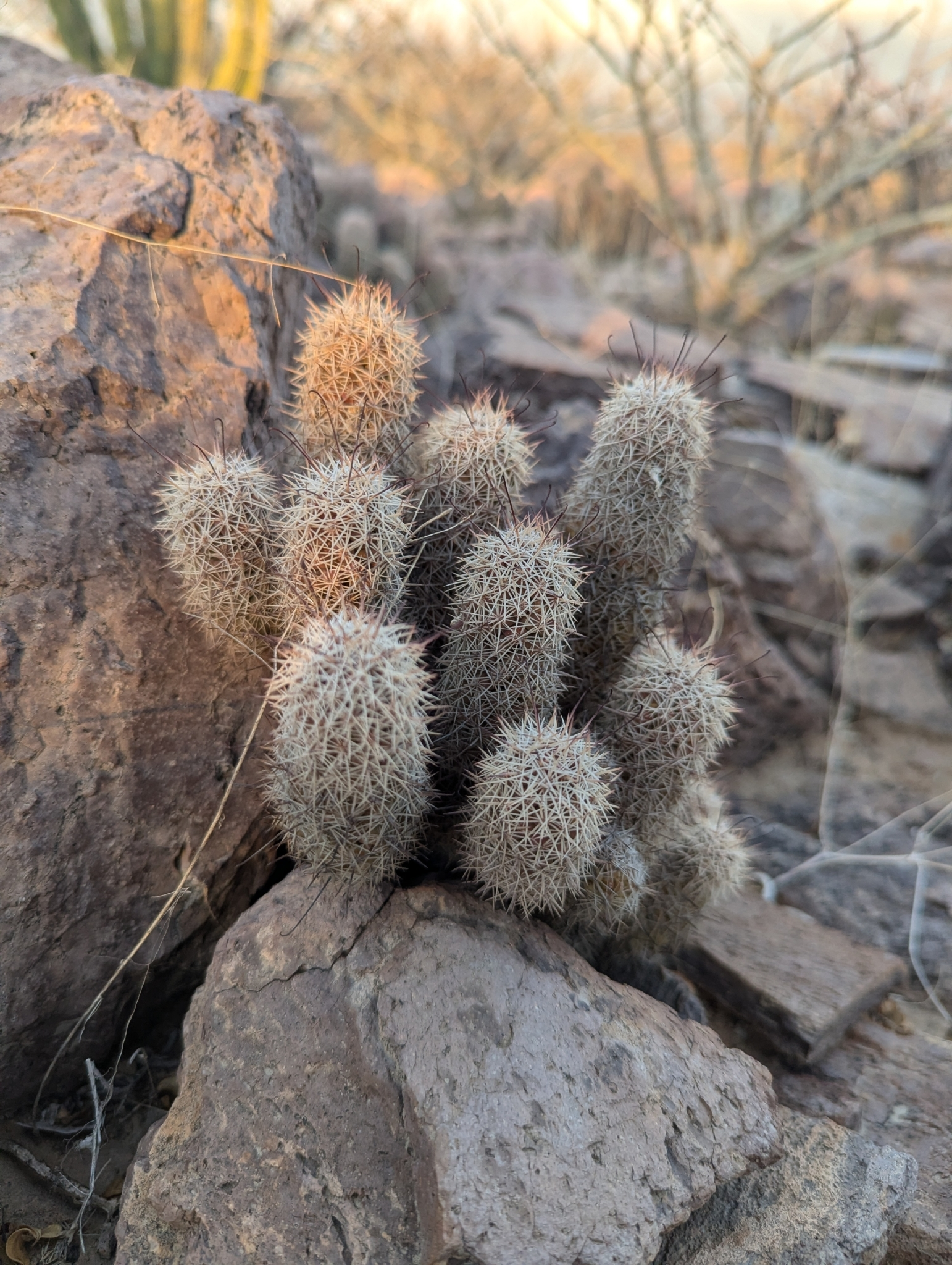
Plants growing in La Paz, Baja California Sur

== Taxonomy ==
Initially described as Neomammillaria albicans in 1923 by Nathaniel Lord Britton and Joseph Nelson Rose, the specific epithet albicans means 'whitish.' Peter B. Breslin and Lucas C. Majure reclassified the species to the genus Cochemiea in 2021.
