= Walter E. Bryant =

American zoologist (1861–1905)

Walter Pierce E. Bryant
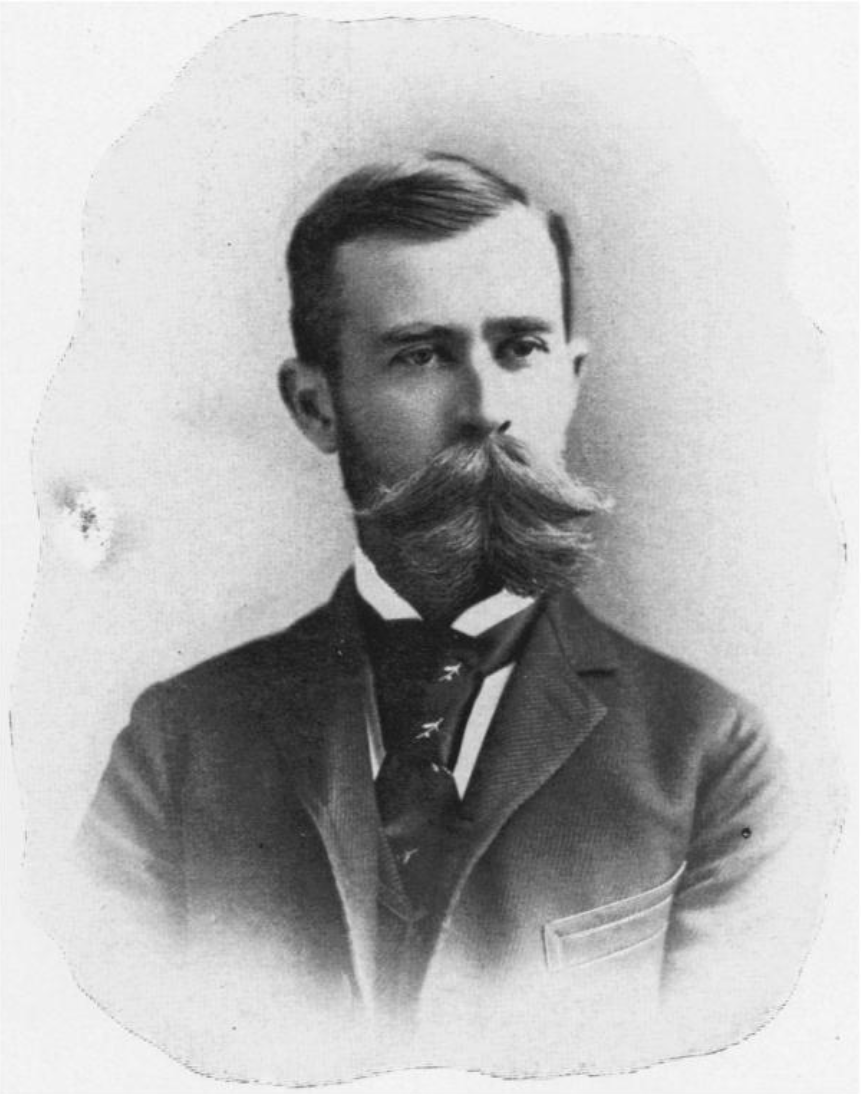
- Walter E. Bryant
- Born: January 14, 1861; Sonoma, California, United States
- Died: May 21, 1905 (aged 44); San Francisco, California, United States
- Known for: Studies of the bird and mammal fauna of the western United States
- Scientific career
- Fields: Ornithology, Mammalogy

Walter Pierce E. Bryant (January 14, 1861 – May 21, 1905) was an American ornithologist and mammalogist who focused primarily on the bird and mammal fauna of the western coast of North America.

== Biography ==
Walter E. Bryant was born in 1861 in Sonoma, Sonoma County, California, the son of Daniel Sharp Bryant and Susan H. Bryant. When he was four years old, he moved with his parents to Oakland, California, where he lived until 1896 before relocating to Santa Rosa. He attended a private school followed by public school in Oakland. From an early age, Bryant showed a strong interest in nature. At the age of seven, his father gave him a firearm and taught him how to use it. Bryant collected insects and bird eggs and began preparing birds through taxidermy. In 1884, he learned mammal preparation techniques from William Temple Hornaday and studied museum practices at the National Museum and the Museum of Comparative Zoology.

In 1886, Bryant became a curator at the California Academy of Sciences, a position he held until 1894. He undertook numerous collecting expeditions, including trips to Oregon in 1883; Guadalupe Island in 1894 and again in 1895–1896; across California and into Nevada in 1887–1888; to Baja California and Magdalena Bay in 1889; to the Gulf of Mexico region and again to Baja California in 1890; to Santa Rosa del Cabo in 1892; to Central America in 1901; to Alaska in 1902–1903; and to San Blas, Mexico, in 1904–1905. In 1888, Bryant became a member of the American Ornithologists’ Union. In 1889, he co-founded the California Ornithological Club and served as its first president. The organization later became the Cooper Ornithological Club, which named Bryant an honorary member in 1894.

== Research focus ==
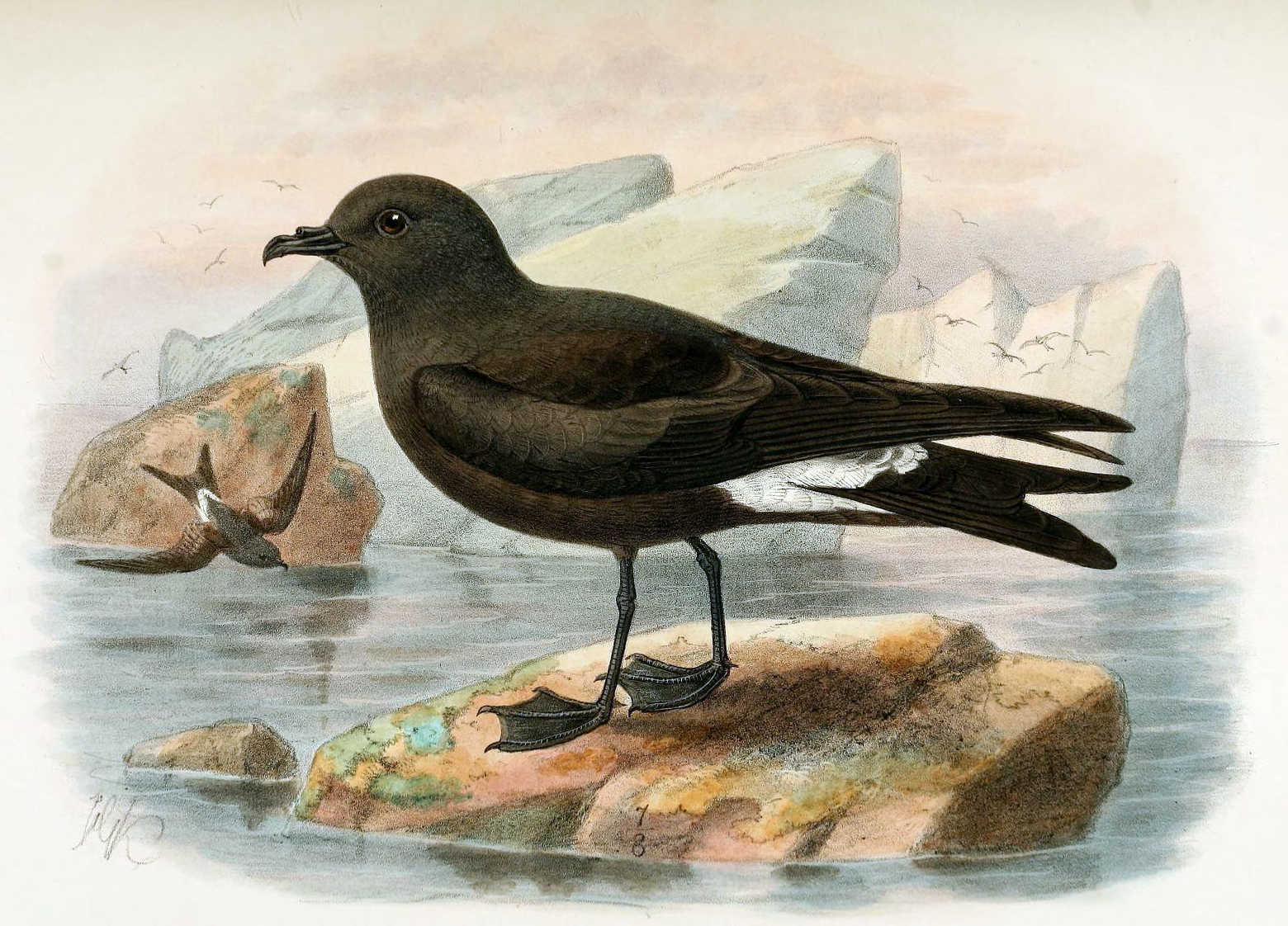
The Guadalupe storm petrel, first described by Bryant in 1887

Bryant published numerous scientific articles, particularly between 1887 and 1889 in the Proceedings of the California Academy of Sciences and between 1890 and 1893 in the journal Zoe. His research primarily addressed observations and studies of the bird and mammal fauna of western North America. Bryant described several new species, some of which are still considered valid today. Among mammals, these include the Baja California ground squirrel and the Espíritu Santo antelope squirrel, and among birds, the Guadalupe storm petrel.

== Selected publications ==
- Bryant, Walter E. (1888). "Description of a new subspecies of Song Sparrow from Lower California, Mexico". Proceedings of the California Academy of Sciences. Second Series. 1. California Academy of Sciences: 197–200.
