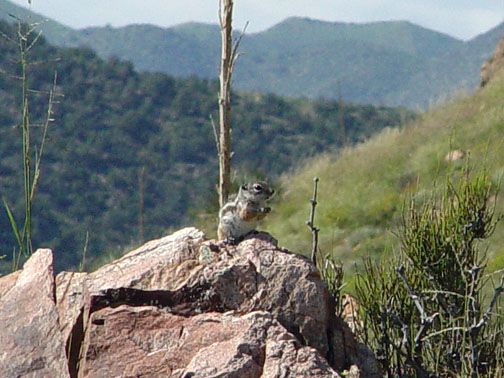

Conservation status
- Least Concern (IUCN 3.1)

Scientific classification
- Kingdom: Animalia
- Phylum: Chordata
- Class: Mammalia
- Order: Rodentia
- Family: Sciuridae
- Genus: Ammospermophilus
- Species: A. interpres

Binomial name
- Ammospermophilus interpres (Merriam, 1890)

= Texas antelope squirrel =

Species of rodent

The Texas antelope squirrel (Ammospermophilus interpres) is a species of rodent in the family Sciuridae. It is found in Mexico and in both Texas and New Mexico within the United States.

== Description ==
Adults can measure up to 220–235 millimetres (8.7–9.3 in) long, and weigh 99–112 grams (0.218–0.247 lb). They have a white stripe along the side of their torso, highlighted with black markings both above and below the stripe. The rest of the fur is grey with either black or brown markings, with the exception of the underside of the tail which is also white. They are active throughout the year and do not hibernate. They are thought to have evolved to their present state by the Clarendonian period (13.6 to 10.3 mya).

The breeding cycle begins in February, with one to two litters of between five and fourteen young raised each year. The young remain in the nest until they are about a quarter grown, which coincides with the move to solid food. Their diet includes insects, seeds and berries, including the fruit and seeds of a variety of cactus species. One adult found in 1905 had eaten the fruit of Opuntia engelmannii in sufficient quantities that its flesh was tinted purple.

== Habitat ==
A. interpres nests in burrows or in crevices amongst rocks, usually close to bushes or shrubs. Within the United States they are found in western Texas, and in parts of south central New Mexico. They are also found in northern Mexico, including in the Chihuahuan Desert. Because of the wide range of their habitat, they are listed as least concern by the IUCN Red List. While they are commonly found within pockets of the United States, they are common throughout their range within Mexico. Their main threat from humans comes from accidental trapping or poisoning within the United States, although they are eaten in some parts of Mexico.
