= Tim Means (environmentalist) =

American Mexican ecotourism pioneer and environmentalist (1944–2019)

Tim "Timoteo" Means
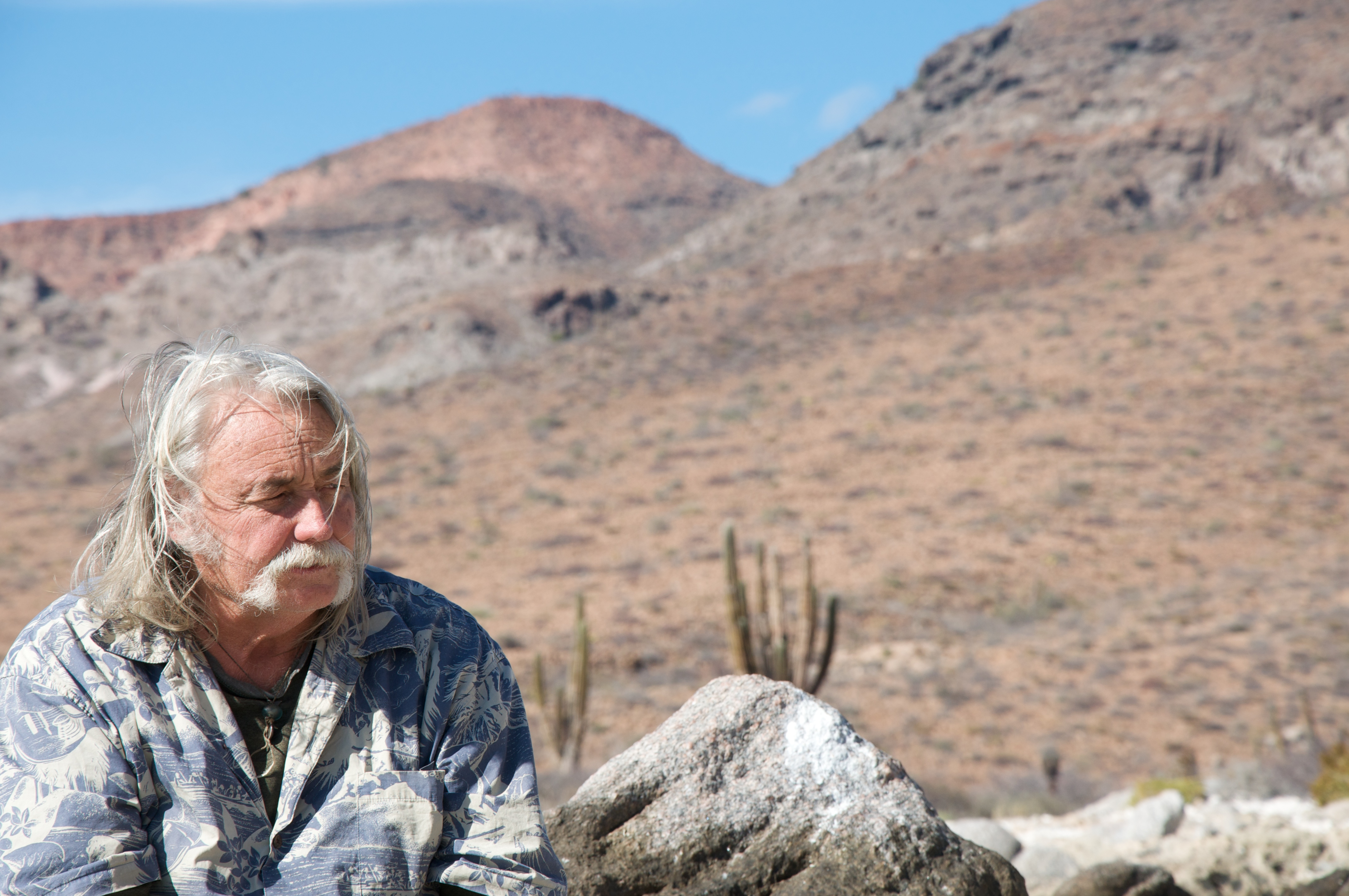
- Born: March 13, 1944; Beaver Falls, Pennsylvania, U.S.
- Died: August 13, 2019 (aged 75); San Diego, California, U.S.
- Burial place: Isla Espíritu Santo
- Occupation(s): Environmentalist; Entrepreneur
- Known for: Saving Isla Espíritu Santo Founding Baja Expeditions

Timothy "Timoteo" Irwin Means Heinemann (March 13, 1944 – August 13, 2019) was an American Mexican ecotourism pioneer and environmentalist, who advocated for the protection and preservation of the Baja California peninsula and its wildlife. He was a catalyst for the Federal government of Mexico's designation of Isla Espíritu Santo as an area of ecological significance and national protected area in 1994, declared subsequently part of a Biosphere Reserve and World Heritage Site by UNESCO. In 2007, Mexico named the Isla Espíritu Santo Archipelago a national park.

== Biography ==
Timothy Irwin Means was born on March 18, 1944, in Beaver Falls Pennsylvania to Melvin Wayne and Flora Agnes Heinemann. His father was an electrician, who worked as a lineman for an Arizona phone company and later at the Hoover Dam. His mother was a homemaker.

Means pioneered adventure trips to Baja California Sur in 1974, to help spur visitors into conviction and action.

With an emphasis on mindfulness, over the years he introduced thousands of visitors from around the world to the Baja wilderness through which he supported many research and education programs focused on marine and desert conservation. To further the preservation of the wild Baja desert and to promote sustainable fishing in the Gulf of California, in 1990 he became a founding member of the Natural History Society Niparajá A.C..

For 45 years Means worked with fishermen, filmmakers, scientists and politicians to draw attention to the depletion of sea life and loss of wild lands posed by overfishing and development, working with American and Mexican environmentalists and patrons to help preserve Isla Espíritu Santo.

Means became a Mexican citizen in 1993.

== Death ==
Tim Means died in San Diego on August 13, 2019, five months after his 75th birthday from diabetic ketoacidosis.

== See also ==
- Isla Espíritu Santo
