= Espíritu Santo antelope squirrel =

Scientific classification
- Kingdom: Animalia
- Phylum: Chordata
- Class: Mammalia
- Order: Rodentia
- Family: Sciuridae
- Genus: Ammospermophilus
- Species: A. insularis

Binomial name
- Ammospermophilus insularis (Nelson & Goldman, 1909)

Synonyms
- Ammospermophilus leucurus insularis; Citellus insularis

Species of rodent

The Espíritu Santo antelope squirrel (Ammospermophilus insularis) is a species of antelope squirrel in the family Sciuridae. It is endemic to Mexico, where it is known only from the island of Espíritu Santo in the Gulf of California. The species was originally described by Edward William Nelson and Edward Alphonso Goldman in 1909 as a subspecies of the white-tailed antelope squirrel (Ammospermophilus leucurus), a wide-ranging species in the southwestern U.S. and Mexico. In 1938, Arthur H. Howell elevated the subspecies to full species status, on the basis of slightly larger skull proportions and the absence or reduction of the third upper premolar. Studies of DNA and chromosomes have variously suggested close relationships with Harris's antelope squirrels (A. harrisii) or other subspecies of white-tailed antelope squirrel. A 2007 comparison of DNA and morphological traits suggested the differences between Espíritu Santo squirrels and those on the Baja California peninsula and other islands were not enough to warrant distinct species but rather a subspecies of white-tailed antelope squirrels. Since 2008 the IUCN has similarly recognized the Espíritu Santo antelope squirrel as a subspecies of white-tailed antelope squirrel.

== Description ==
Ammospermophilus insularis diverged from Ammospermophilus leucurus species (specific to southern Baja California peninsula) and display similar characteristics. Both species contain two defined black bands alternating with three white bands on the underside of the tail. There are, however, several unique traits that distinguish A. insularis from A. leucurus. A. insularis males and females are slightly larger and darker compared to A. leucurus and display missing or vestigial upper premolar. An upper premolar is generally variable among the family Sciuridae but is significantly different as seen in A. insularis compared to other Ammospermophilus species. A larger skull is also observed in A. insularis, specifically the zygomatic arches, nasals, and auditory bullae.

== Biogeography ==
A. insularis is distributed in specific location of Mexican state regions. It is found in the Nearctic sub region, Californian Dominion, Baja California Province, and Baja California Sur Mexican state. There are three major lineages of the Ammospermophilus including, A. nelsoni, A. leucurus, and A. harrisii. Geographic isolation of A. leucurus gave rise to the sub species A. insularis. A. insularis inhabits rocky desert environments in Baja California Sur, Mexico including Isla Espiritu Santo and Isla San Marcos. The elevation range is from sea level to about 600 meters above sea level and generally not seen in higher elevation coniferous forests.

== Phylogenetic History ==
A. insularis diverged from the southern Baja California lineage A. leucurus. Cytochrome B data analysis displays a divergence value of 2% indicating intraspecific variation. Haplotypes have also displayed an overlap and close resemblance between A. insularis and A. leucurus. Even though the A. insularis haplotypes are monophyletic, they are nested within the A. leucurus lineage. Glacial expansion and retreat during the Pleistocene resulted in isolation of the genus Ammospermophilus leading to divergence into its three general groups. Southern Baja California A. leucurus species diverged approximately 2.5 million years ago somewhere between the end of the Pliocene and beginning of Pleistocene era. A. insularis diverged from A. leucurus about 640,00 years ago during Pleistocene era.
