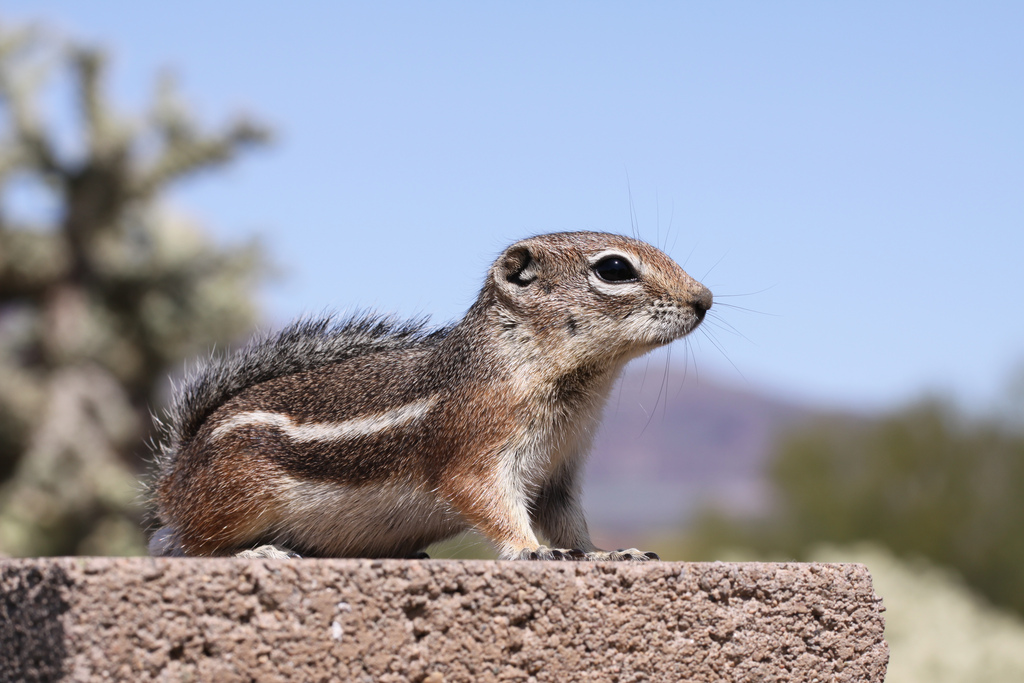

Conservation status
- Least Concern (IUCN 3.1)

Scientific classification
- Kingdom: Animalia
- Phylum: Chordata
- Class: Mammalia
- Order: Rodentia
- Family: Sciuridae
- Genus: Ammospermophilus
- Species: A. harrisii

Binomial name
- Ammospermophilus harrisii (Audubon & Bachman, 1854)
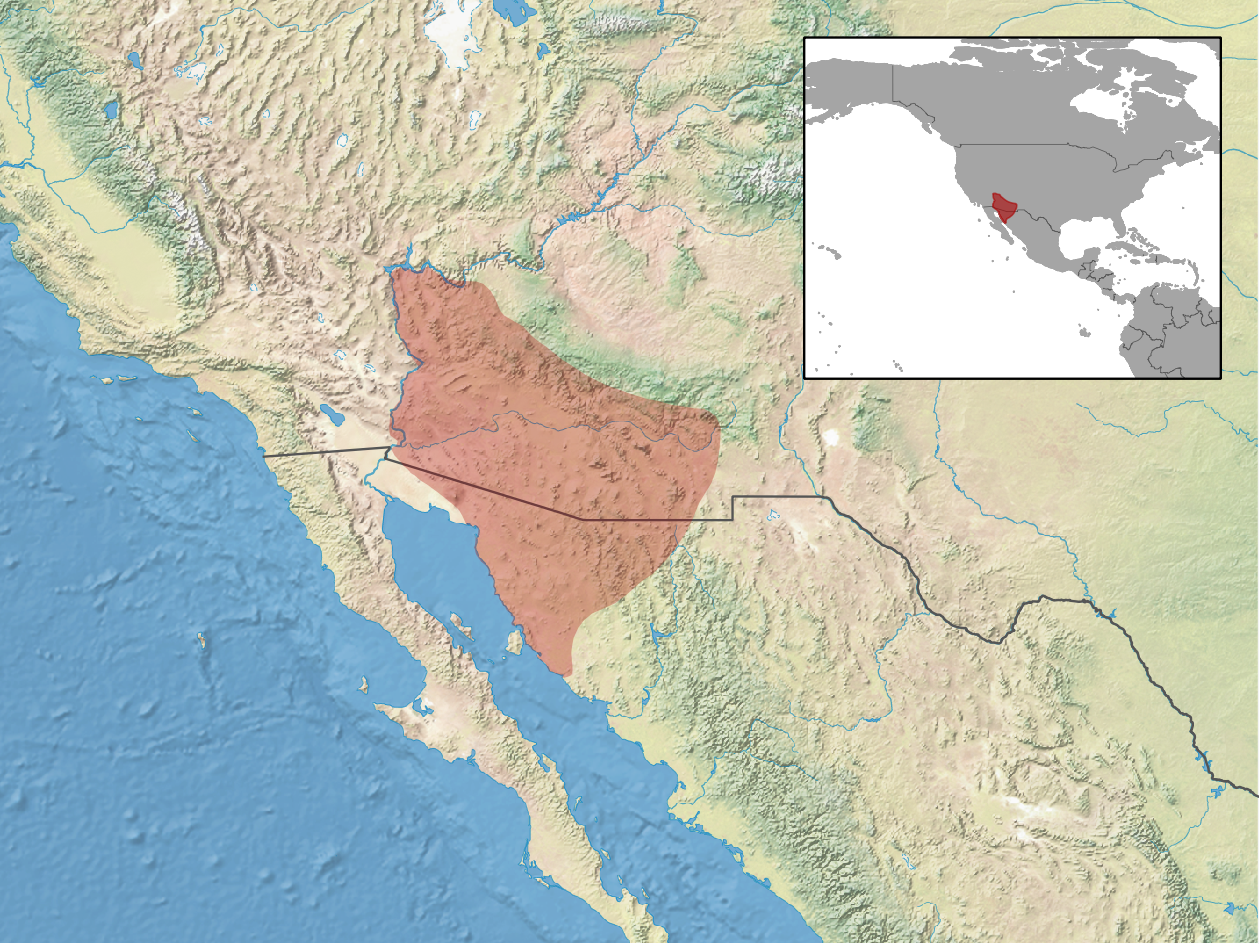

= Harris's antelope squirrel =

Species of rodent

Harris's antelope squirrel (Ammospermophilus harrisii) is a species of rodent in the family Sciuridae. It is found in Arizona and New Mexico in the United States, and in Sonora in Mexico. They are adapted to hot weather conditions including a technique called "heat dumping". They have a wide-ranging diet, including both vegetation, insects, small rodents and carrion.

== Taxonomy and description ==
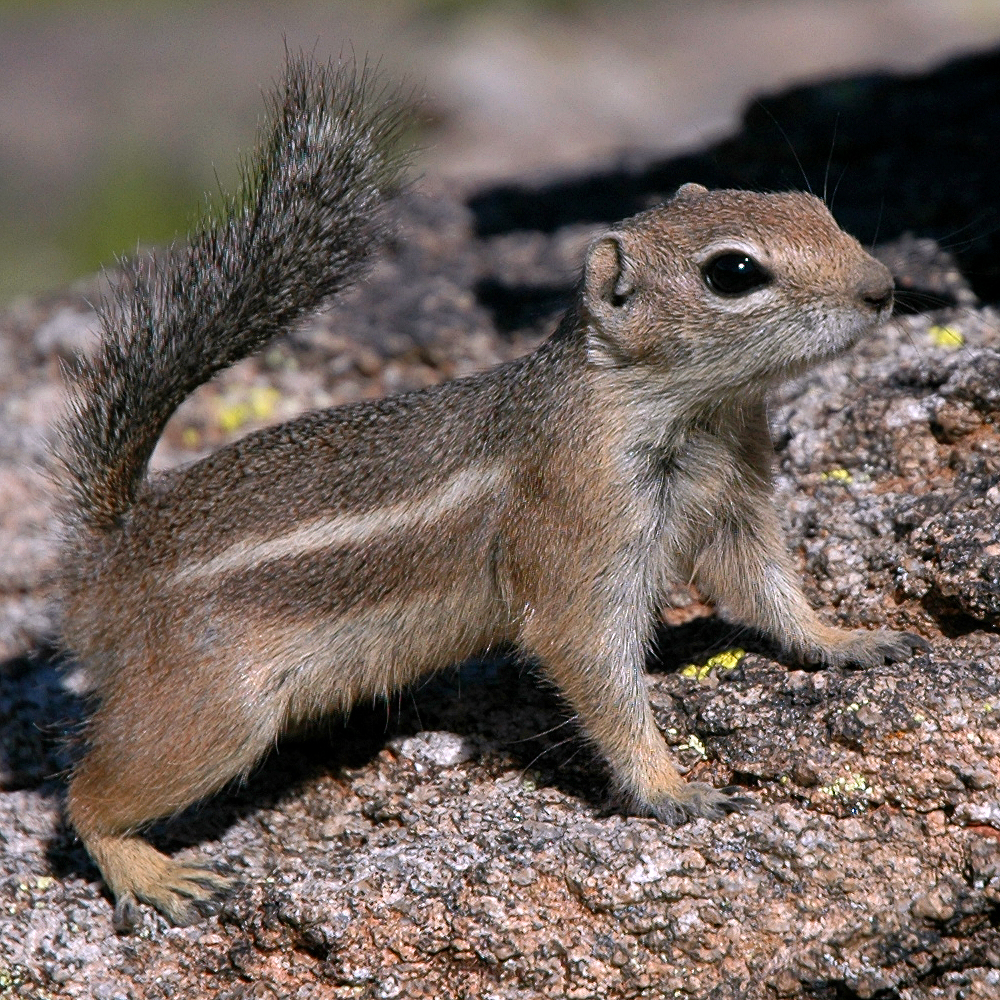
A. harrisii holding its tail over its back

The species is named after Edward Harris. Examples of A. harrisii have distinctive markings on their grey fur, with brown highlights on the sides and legs and a white strip down the side of the torso and encircling their eyes. Their fur grows longer in the winter than it does in the summer. Adults weigh around 4–5 ounces (110–140 g), and measure 8.5–10 inches (22–25 cm) minus their tail, which measures 3–4 inches (7.6–10.2 cm). They can be mistaken for chipmunks.

A. harrisii has a high body temperature of 97-107 degrees Fahrenheit (36.7 - 41.6 °C) In order to protect itself from the heat of the Sonoran Desert, A. harrisii carries their tails over their bodies in order to provide shade. A. harrisii also participates in a heat reduction method where individuals move into shaded positions and lie spread eagled against the ground. This is referred to as "heat dumping". They are active during the day, and do not sweat but otherwise reduce temperature by salivating.

The optimum reproductive period for A. harrisii is between February and March although mating can take place between December and June. Gestation lasts thirty days, and females usually have one litter per year with an average of 6.5 pups. Newborns grow to adult size at around 217 days after birth. Both males and females reach sexual maturity during the first year.

== Habitat ==
The habitat of A. harrisii ranges across the Southwestern United States, specifically in Arizona and the southwest of New Mexico. The range extends outside the US into Mexico into the northwest of the state of Sonora. They are designated as a non-game animal by the Arizona Game and Fish Department. While the species is not endangered, the range of its habitats is being reduced by human developments.

Their diet includes the fruit and seeds of local cactus plants, as well as beans of the mesquite plant. They do not only eat vegetation, and also consume insects, small rodents and carrion. They have a variety of predators including the bobcat, coyotes, as well as local snakes and domestic animals such as dogs and cats.
