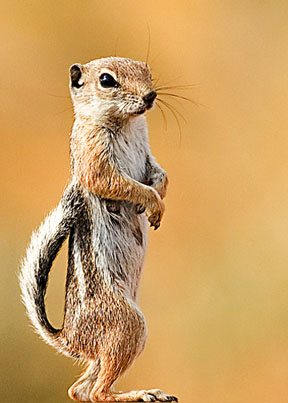
- In southern Utah

Conservation status
- Least Concern (IUCN 3.1)

Scientific classification
- Kingdom: Animalia
- Phylum: Chordata
- Class: Mammalia
- Order: Rodentia
- Family: Sciuridae
- Genus: Ammospermophilus
- Species: A. leucurus

Binomial name
- Ammospermophilus leucurus (Merriam, 1889)
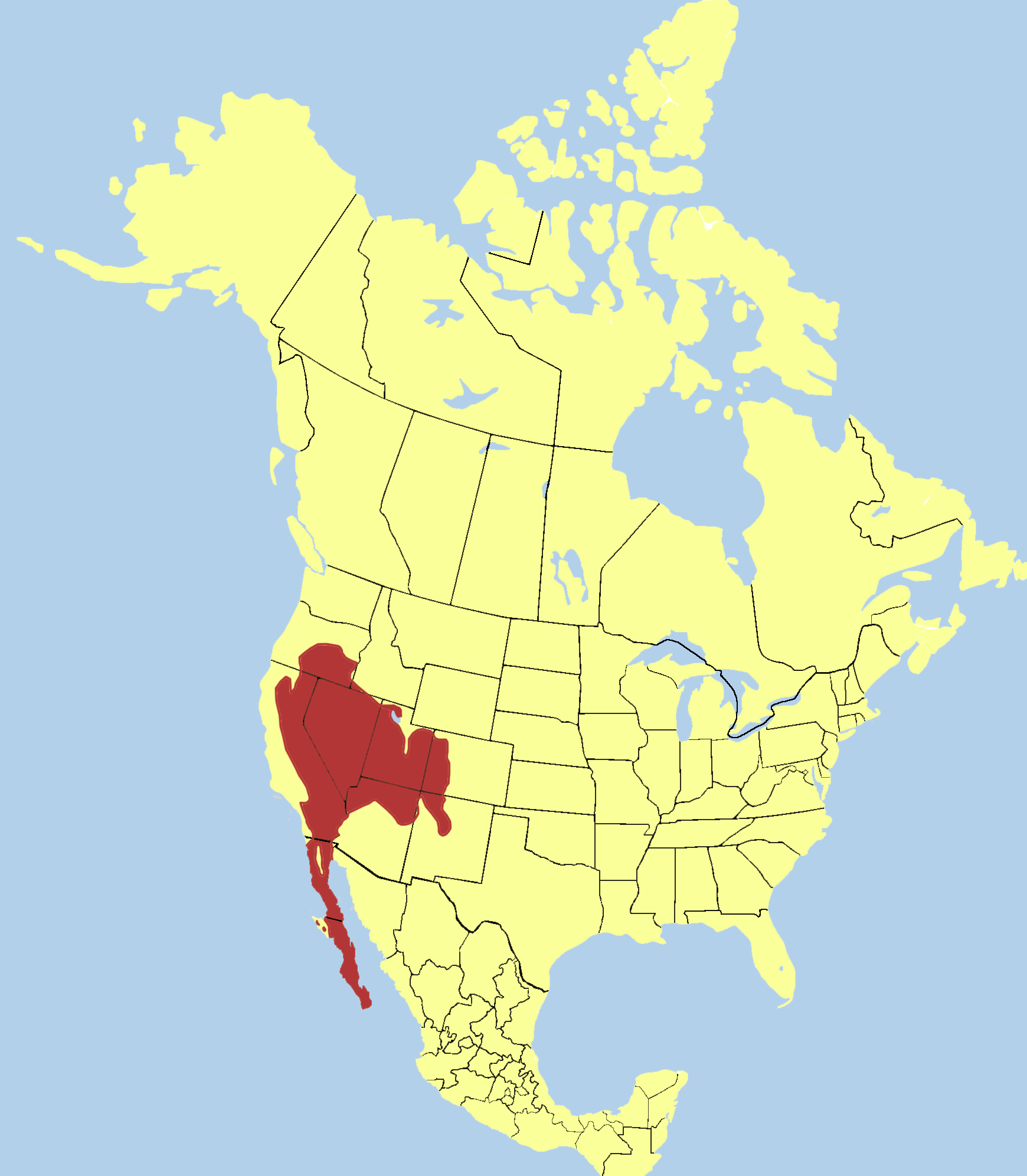
- Distribution map of the white-tailed antelope squirrel

= White-tailed antelope squirrel =

Species of rodent

The white-tailed antelope squirrel (Ammospermophilus leucurus) is a diurnal species of ground squirrel, scientifically classified in the order Rodentia and family Sciuridae, found in arid regions of the southwestern United States and the Baja California Peninsula of northwestern Mexico.

== Distribution ==
The white-tailed antelope squirrel's geographical range extends north to south from southwestern Oregon to New Mexico, and east to west from western Colorado to Baja California, Mexico.

== Home range and population density ==
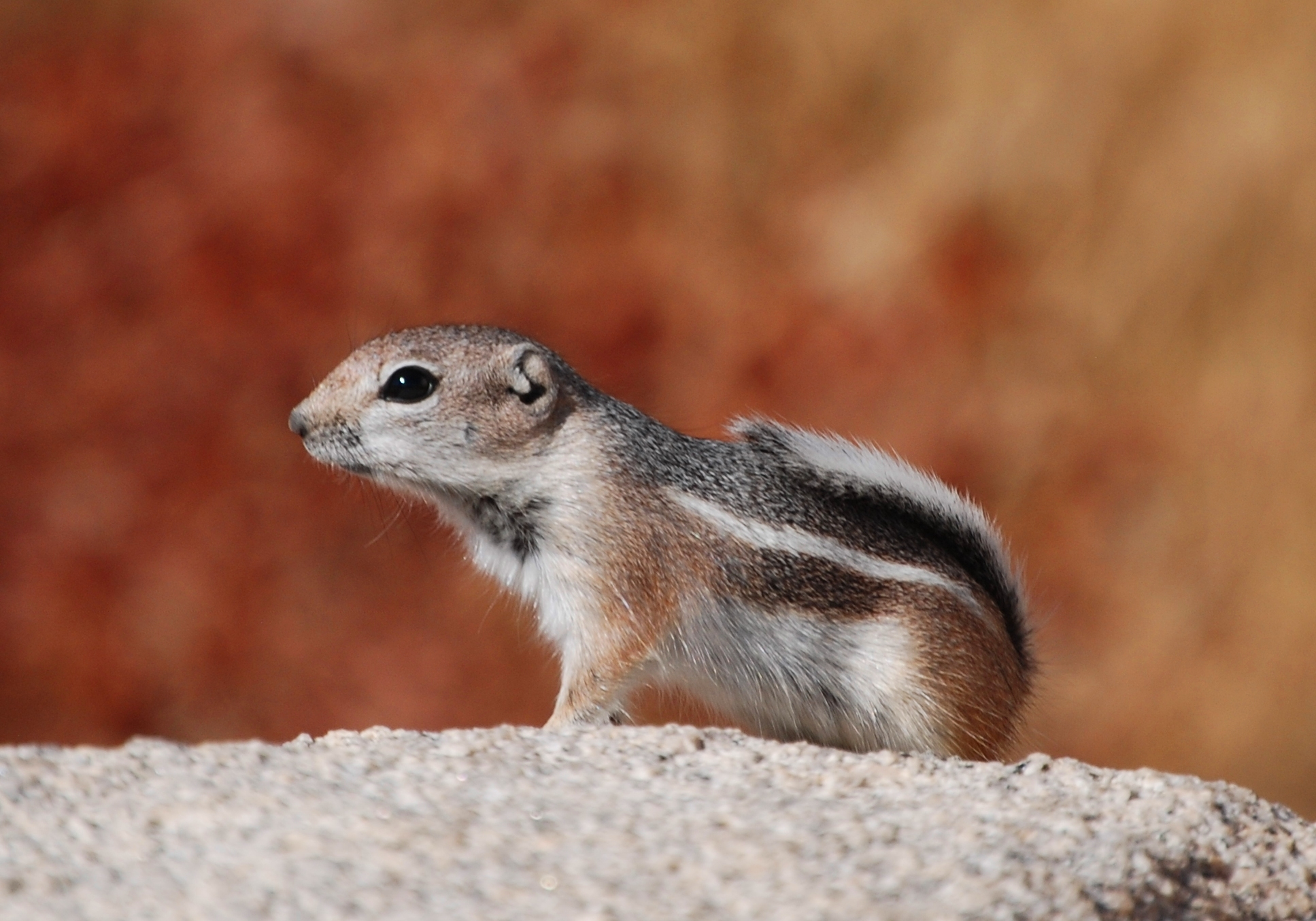
White-tailed antelope squirrel in Joshua Tree National Park, California.

This species of squirrel has an average home range of 14.9 acres (60,000 m^{2}), and utilizes approximately 4 acres (16,000 m^{2}) in its daily activities. Throughout much of the squirrel's range, especially in Utah, the population density fluctuates greatly, with periods of high density followed by periods of low density. Average population density also varies by season, with higher density in autumn relative to late spring.

== Ecology ==
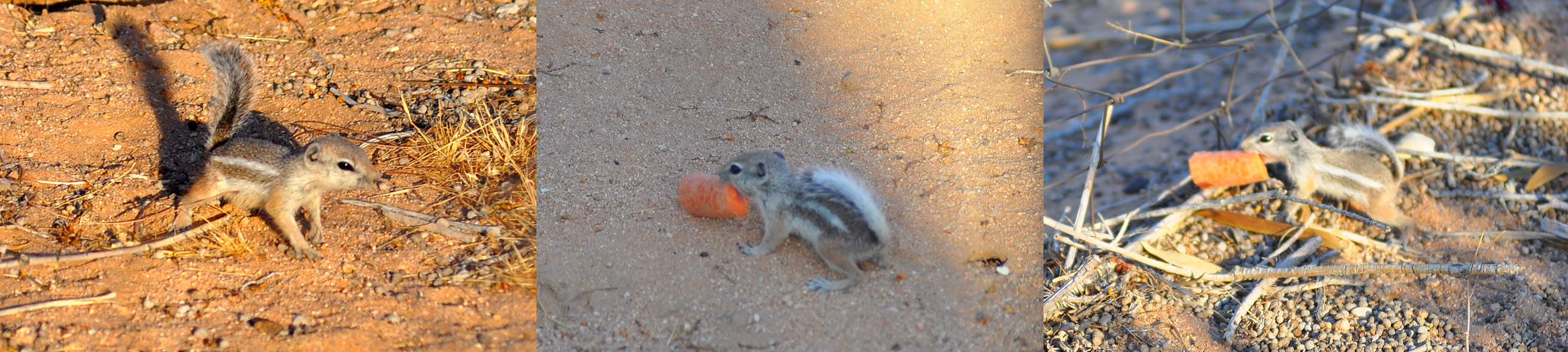
A juvenile white-tailed antelope squirrel enters a human's property and drags its carrot prize to safety

The white-tailed antelope squirrel is commonly spotted in arid habitats throughout the southwestern United States. Throughout this range, A. leucurus is omnivorous, feeding primarily on foliage (10%-60% of its diet), seeds (20%-50%), arthropods, and to a lesser extent, vertebrates (mainly lizards and rodents; predatory behavior by ground squirrels has been noted). In conjunction with being a predator, the white-tailed antelope squirrel is also prey to many larger animals, including raptors, various canids, and snakes. These squirrels are not only preyed upon by large predators, but they also fall victim to many diverse ectoparasites. These include various ticks, fleas, mites, lice, and a couple species of parasitic larvae.

== Behavior ==
Antelope squirrels are active most during the cooler parts of the daylight hours, avoiding midday as much as possible. Although these animals live in hot and arid climates, the white-tailed antelope squirrel is diurnal, meaning heat gain from metabolic activity could be a problem. However, compared to direct exposure of heat from the sun, metabolic heat gain contributes little to the overheating of this species. This diurnal activity pattern may be attributed to predation patterns. Selective pressures may have led to this species avoiding nighttime activity due to increased predation by nighttime predators. This behavior is controlled by the squirrels' natural circadian rhythms, and research has shown these rhythms to be highly important in keeping these diurnal activity patterns intact.

== Reproduction ==
=== Timing ===
White-tailed antelope squirrels' reproductive receptiveness in females and reproductive capability in males peaks in early spring. It only takes the squirrels one year to become sexually mature and begin reproducing; typically, antelope ground squirrels will produce one large litter per year.

=== Geographical variation ===
Geographical factors, and thus environmental factors, weigh heavily on this species' reproductive cycle length and average litter size. Specifically, this variation is seen best when comparing the northern and southern extents of the antelope ground squirrels' distribution. In Oregon, which is the northernmost extent of the squirrels' range, reproductive cycles are relatively short, and the average litter size is 9.3. However, in Baja California, the southernmost extent of the squirrels' range, reproductive cycles last half of the year, and the average litter size is 5.9.
