= Isla Partida =

Island in Baja California Sur, Mexico

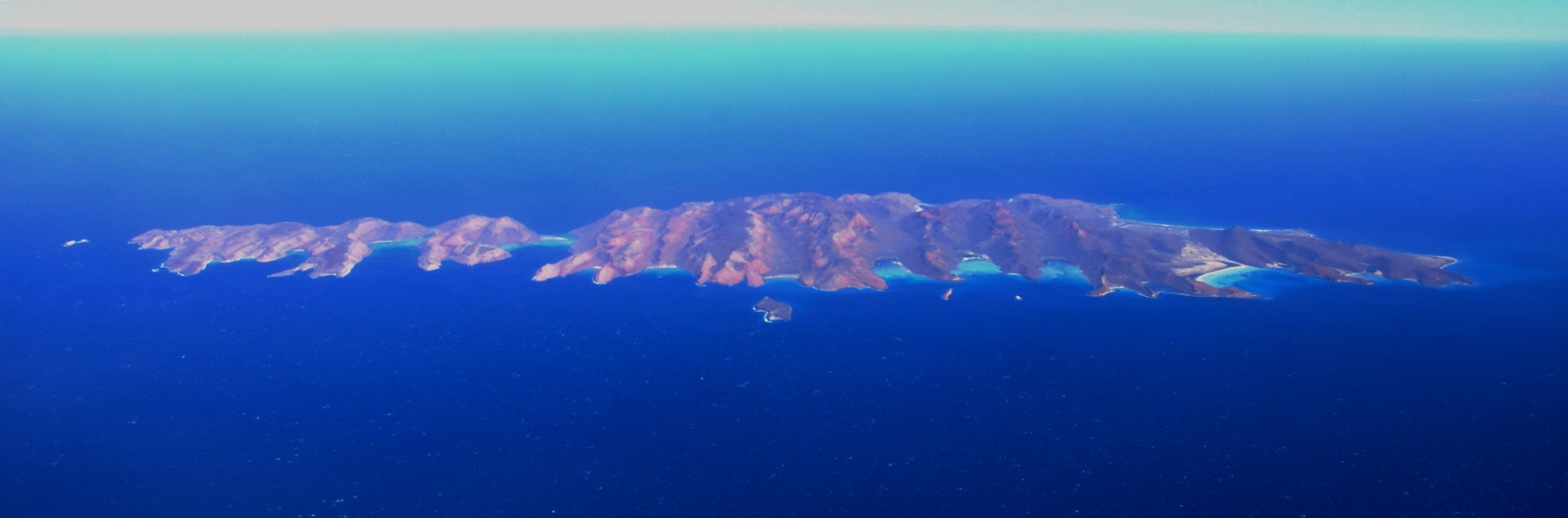
- Espiritu Santo and Partida Islands

- Location within Baja California Sur Location within Mexico

Geography
- Location: Gulf of California
- Coordinates: 24°33′45″N 110°22′42″W

Administration
- Mexico
- State: Baja California Sur

Demographics
- Population: uninhabited

Isla Partida is separated from Isla Espíritu Santo by a shallow, narrow channel. These two islands, in the Gulf of California, are protected by UNESCO as biospheres. They are located a short boat ride from La Paz, which lies on the Baja California Peninsula in Mexico. It has a land area of 15.495 km (9.628 mi) and is part of the Municipality of La Paz in Baja California Sur.

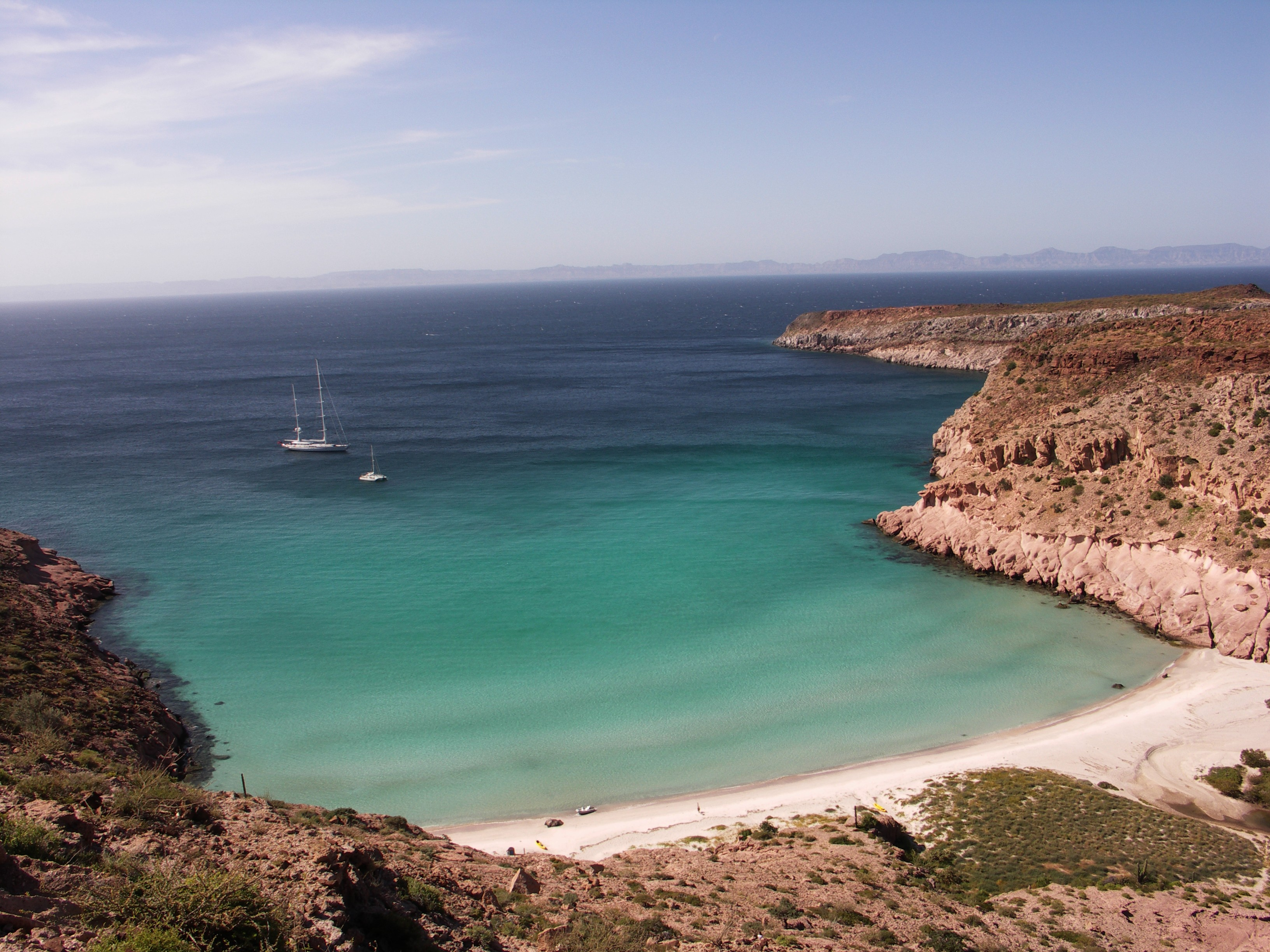
Ensenada Grande beach, Isla Partida, Baja California
