= Isla Espíritu Santo =

Island in Baja California Sur, Mexico

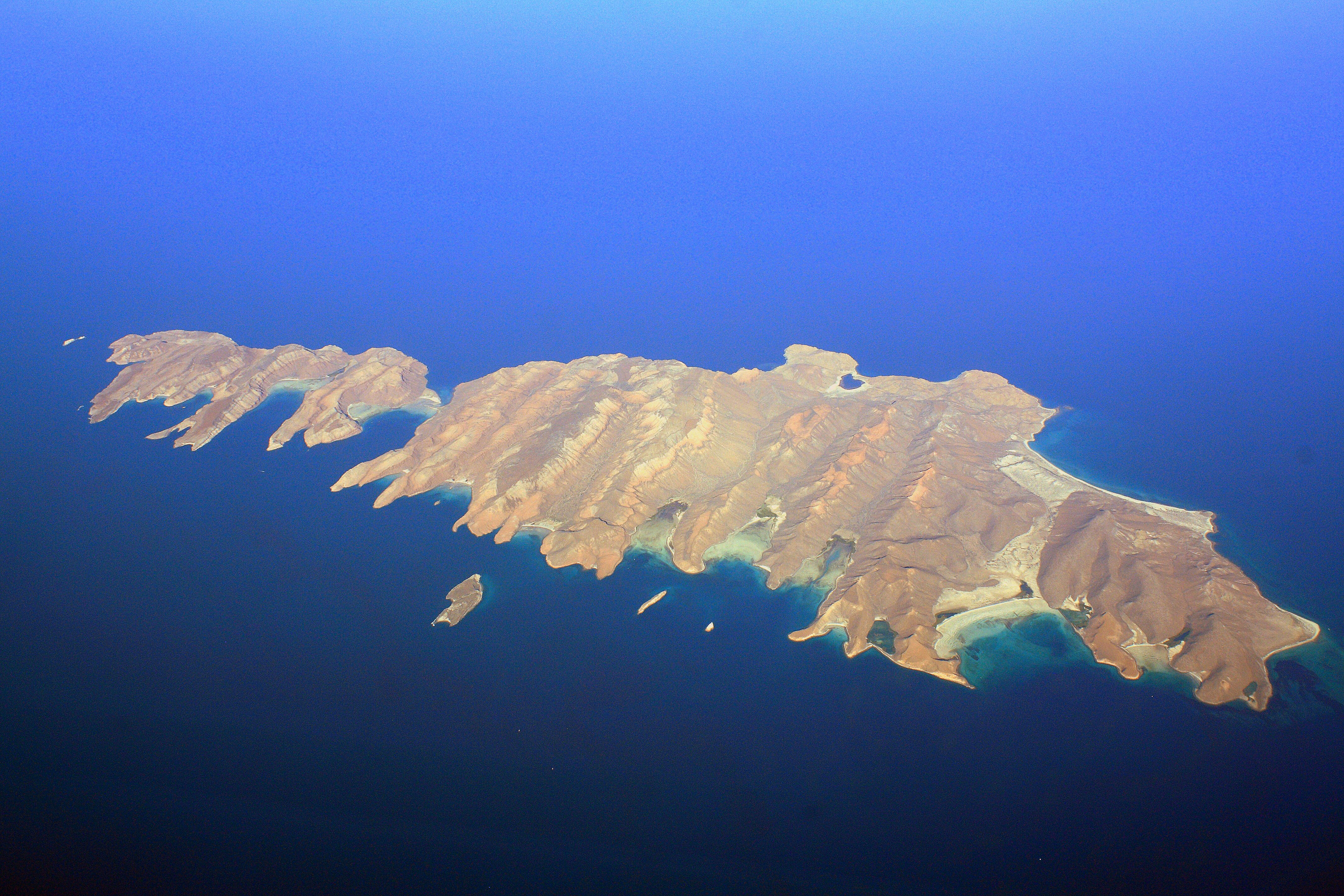
- Aerial view of Isla Espíritu Santo (right) and Isla Partida (left)

- Location within Baja California Sur

Geography
- Location: Gulf of California
- Coordinates: 24°28′17″N 110°19′57″W
- Adjacent to: Pacific Ocean
- Area: 80.763 km^{2} (31.183 sq mi)

Administration
- Mexico
- State: Baja California Sur
- Municipality: La Paz

Demographics
- Population: Uninhabited

Isla Espíritu Santo is an uninhabited island in the Gulf of California, off the Mexican state of Baja California Sur. It is separated from Isla Partida by a narrow canal.

Together, the islands are part of La Paz Municipality and are both a short boat trip from La Paz on the Baja California Peninsula.

The earliest evidence of human presence on the island dates to about 9,000 years ago.

== Geography and geology ==
Isla Espriritu Santo is located in the Sea of Cortez (Gulf of California), about 26 kilometres (16 mi) to its southern tip from the port city of La Paz, Mexico. Together with its sister island Isla Partida, the islands are a rock formation created by a series of violent earthquakes and volcanic activity. As such, volcanic ash and lava make up the majority of their geologic composition. With fairly straight high ridges and low valleys, the islands resemble a horizontal rainbow with earthy tones. Espiritu has a land area of 80.763 square kilometres (31.183 sq mi), and its highest elevation is 562 metres (1,844 ft). Partida has a land area of 15.495 kilometres (9.628 mi), and its highest elevation is 282 metres (925 ft) At its Northern edge, Espiritu is divided from Partida by a narrow strait. At certain times with the right tide, the strait is shallow enough to wade across. By itself, Espíritu is the twelfth largest island in Mexico. There are a number of smaller islets that accompany the two main islands, of which only four are named. They are Isla Lobos, Isla Ballena, Isla Gallo and Isla Gallina. The islands also contain a handful of beautiful white sandy beaches, complemented by pristine aquamarine waters and sheer bluffs.

== Ecology ==
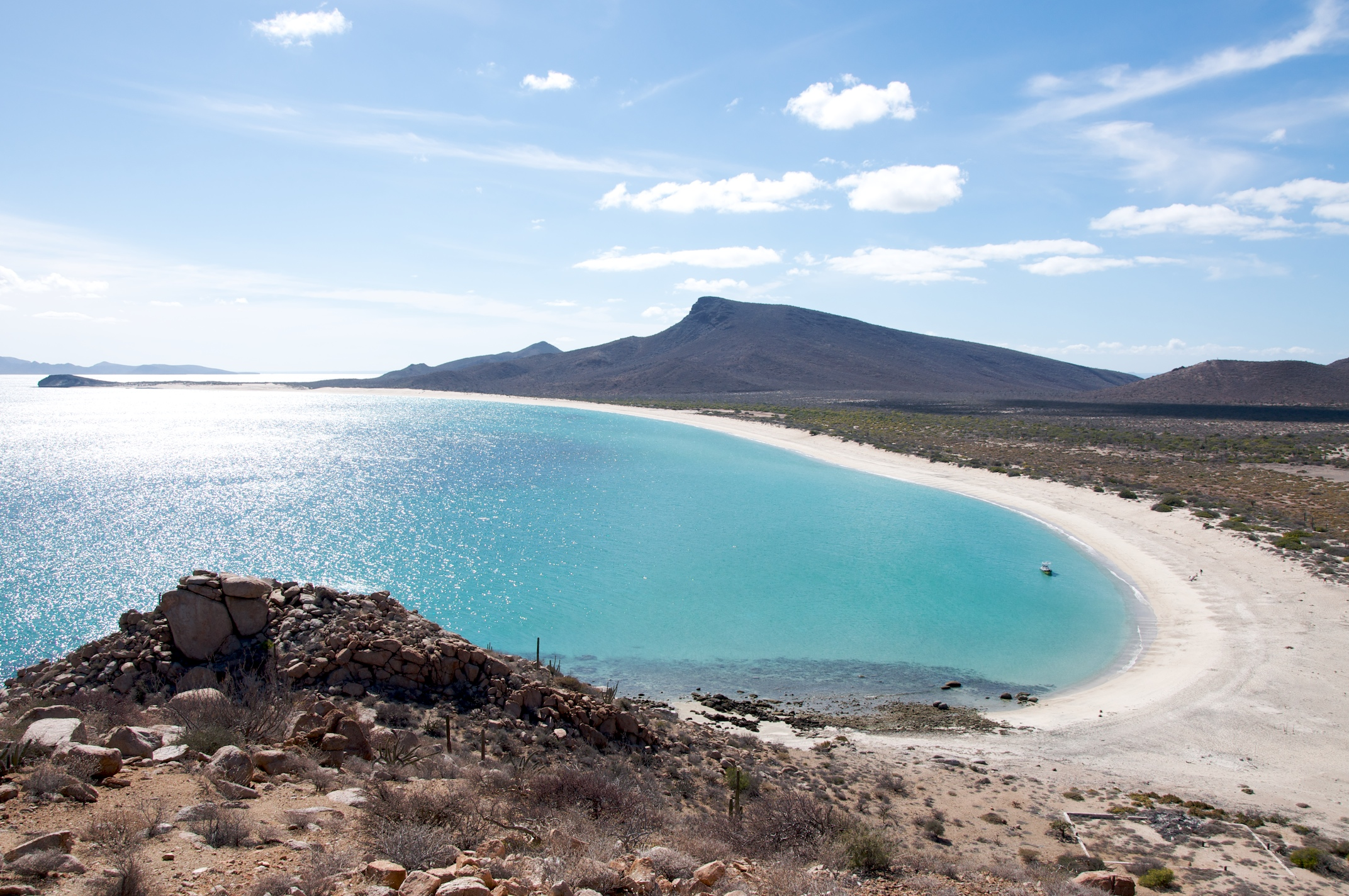
The beach on Espíritu Santo

Espíritu Santo, Partida, and the sea around them are in protected areas. The islands are part of the Islas del Golfo de California Flora and Fauna Protection Area (APFF-IGC), and is an important eco-tourism destination. It was declared part of a Biosphere Reserve by UNESCO in 1995. The islands are both uninhabited. Ensenada Grande beach, on Isla Partida, was voted the most beautiful beach in Mexico by The Travel Magazine and one of the top 12 beaches in the world. Sea kayaking is a popular activity around the island.

Espíritu Santo is the only known habitat of the black jackrabbit (Lepus insularis) and Espíritu Santo antelope squirrel (Ammospermophilus insularis).

The surrounding reefs are home to parrotfish, angelfish, trumpetfish, Moorish idols, and rainbow wrasse, while many other species pass nearby including sharks, rays, turtles, dolphins, and even whales. Birds include brown pelicans, great blue herons, snowy egrets, turkey vultures, and hummingbirds. A large sea lion colony resides on Los Islotes, off the north tip of the islands; snorkeling with the females and young is a highlight of many tours.

Conservation-minded eco-adventurers were not the only ones attracted to the island, and by the 1990s the pressure on Isla Espiritu Santo was intense: a real estate developer wanted to create a resort casino on the island. Tim Means, founder of Baja Expeditions, who since 1974 had been a leading conservationist based in La Paz, formed a coalition of activists who were able to purchase part of the island from the ejido that was selling it to the casino resort developer. One-third of the funds came from Mexican funders, another third from American funders via the Nature Conservancy, and the rest through an anonymous gift to the World Wildlife Fund. Their subsequent donation of Isla Espiritu Santo to the nation is commemorated by a famous sculpture of a dove on the boardwalk in La Paz.

In 1994, Espiritu Santo, Partida, and the other Gulf of California Islands were declared a Biosphere Reserve by UNESCO. The Mexican Government designated the Gulf of California Islands a flora and fauna protection area in 2000. UNESCO designated the Gulf of California Islands a World Heritage Site in 2005.

In 2007, the marine area around Espiritu Santo and Partida islands was declared a marine national park. Archipiélago Espíritu Santo National Park protects an area of 479.9 km^{2}.

== Archaeology ==
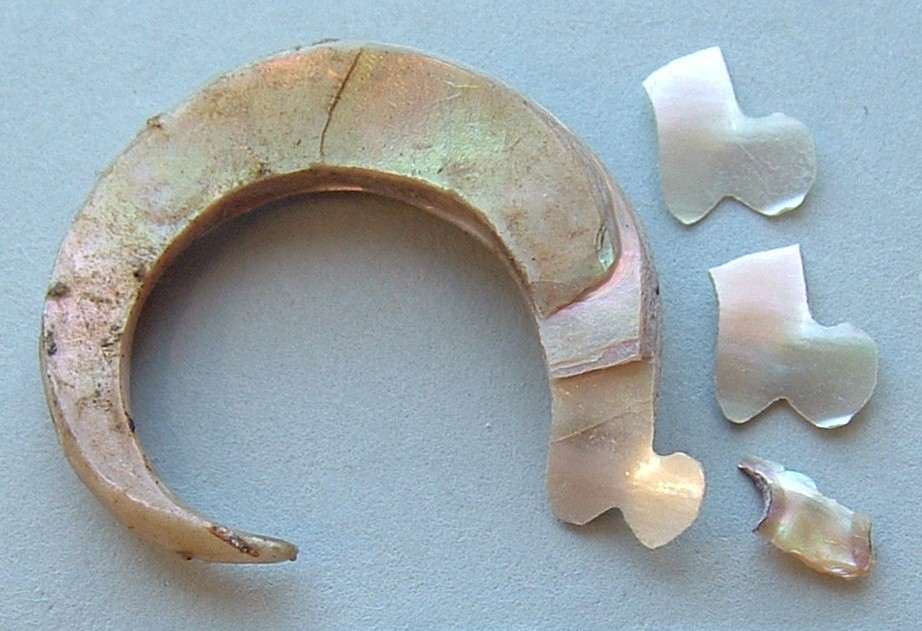
Native American shell fish hook from California. Auckland Museum

Early Holocene pearl oyster circular fishhooks, dating to 8750–8500 cal BP, have been discovered on Espíritu Santo Island. They've been found in Covacha Babisuri rock shelter on the island. This is one of the earliest known examples of shell fishhooks in the world.

"The pearl oyster fishhooks and some of the associated tools from Espíritu Santo Island, in the southern Gulf of California in Mexico, are similar to those found in Australia, along the Arabian Sea (Roth 1904, Allen 1996, Beech 2003, Méry et al. 2008), and in Valdivia (Meggers et al. 1965:147)."

Similar fishhooks have also been reported from Cedros Island, also in Baja California.

== See also ==
- Islas Marías
- Revillagigedo Islands
