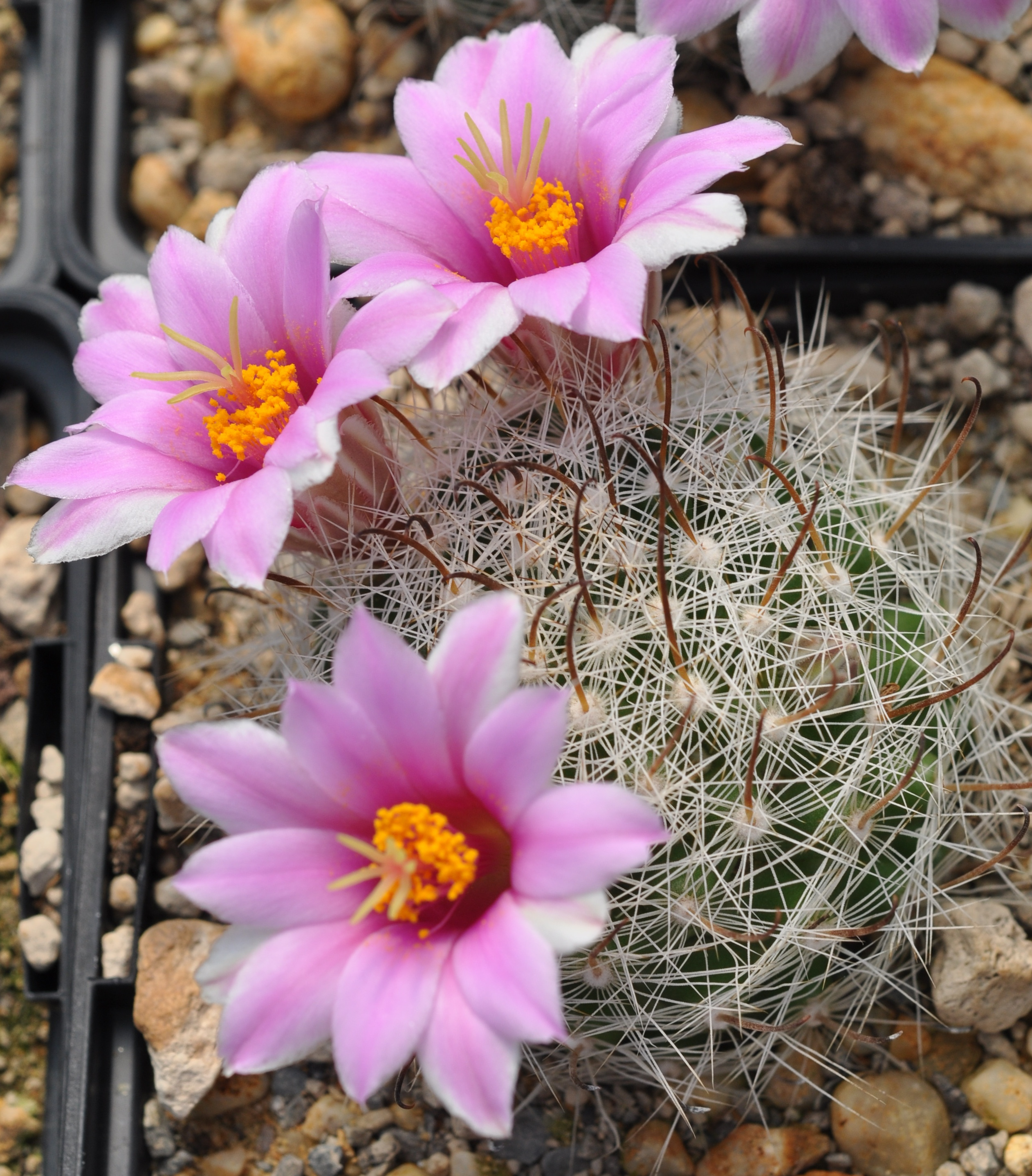

Conservation status
- Least Concern (IUCN 3.1)

Scientific classification
- Kingdom: Plantae
- Clade: Tracheophytes
- Clade: Angiosperms
- Clade: Eudicots
- Order: Caryophyllales
- Family: Cactaceae
- Subfamily: Cactoideae
- Genus: Cochemiea
- Species: C. insularis

Binomial name
- Cochemiea insularis (H.E.Gates) P.B.Breslin & Majure 2021

Synonyms
- Bartschella insularis (H.E.Gates) Doweld 2000; Chilita insularis (H.E.Gates) Buxb. 1954; Ebnerella insularis (H.E.Gates) Buxb. 1951; Mammillaria insularis H.E.Gates 1938; Neomammillaria insularis (H.E.Gates) Y.Itô 1981

= Cochemiea insularis =

Species of cactus

Cochemiea insularis is a rare species of cactus in the genus Cochemiea commonly known as the island nipple cactus. It is endemic to the vicinity of Bahía de los Ángeles and its neighboring islands in Baja California, Mexico.

== Description ==
Cochemiea insularis typically grows in groups, with flattened, mostly spherical blue-green bodies reaching up to 6 cm in height and 5 cm in diameter. The fleshy roots support conical warts without milky sap, while axillae may be bare or woolly with few bristles. It features a 1 cm long hooked central spine with a brown tip and 20 to 30 needle-like white marginal spines, each up to 0.5 cm long.

Its funnel-shaped flowers, 1.5 to 2.5 cm wide, are light pink, and its orange-red club-shaped fruits, up to 1 cm in size, contain black seeds.

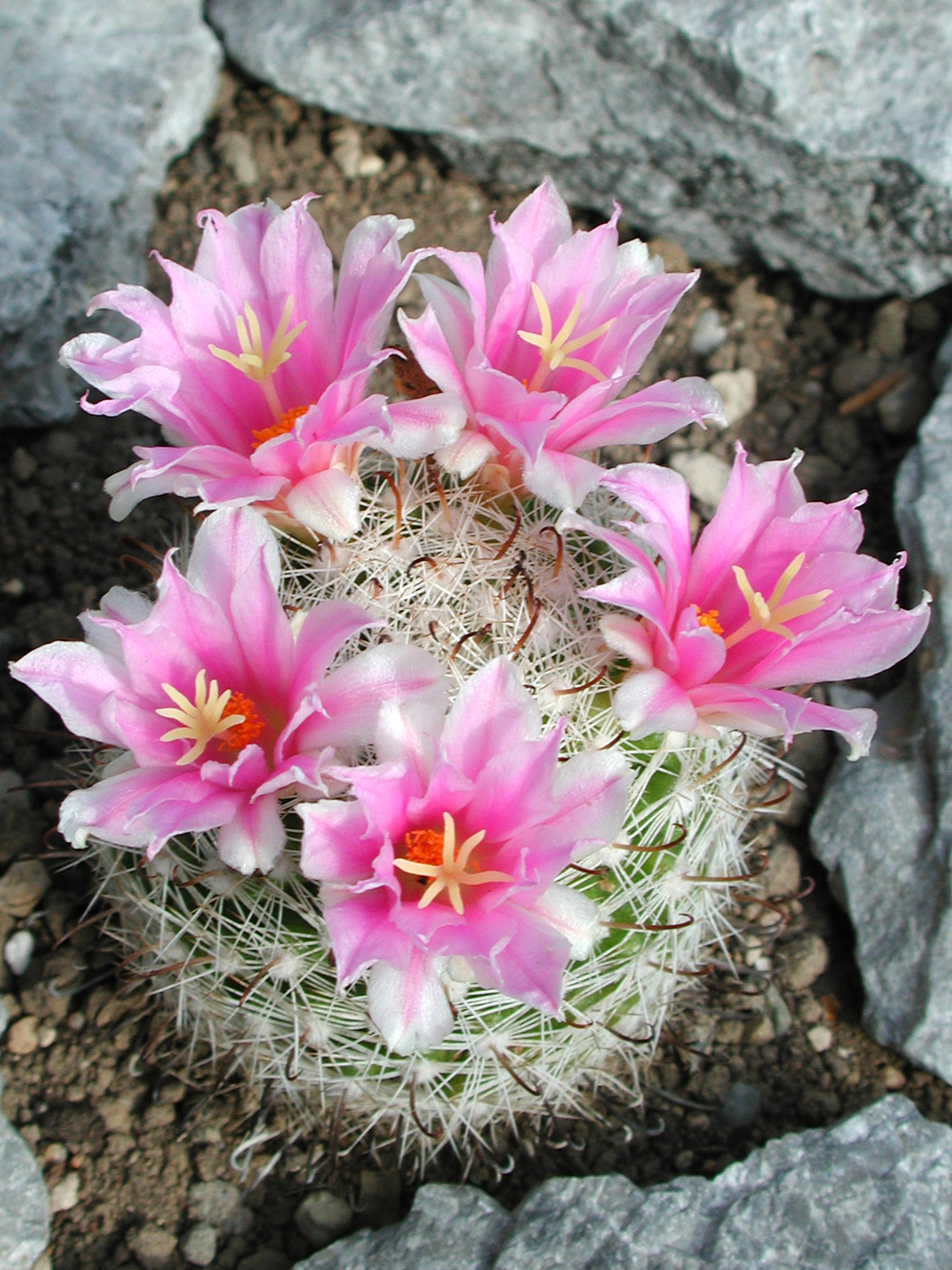
Flower

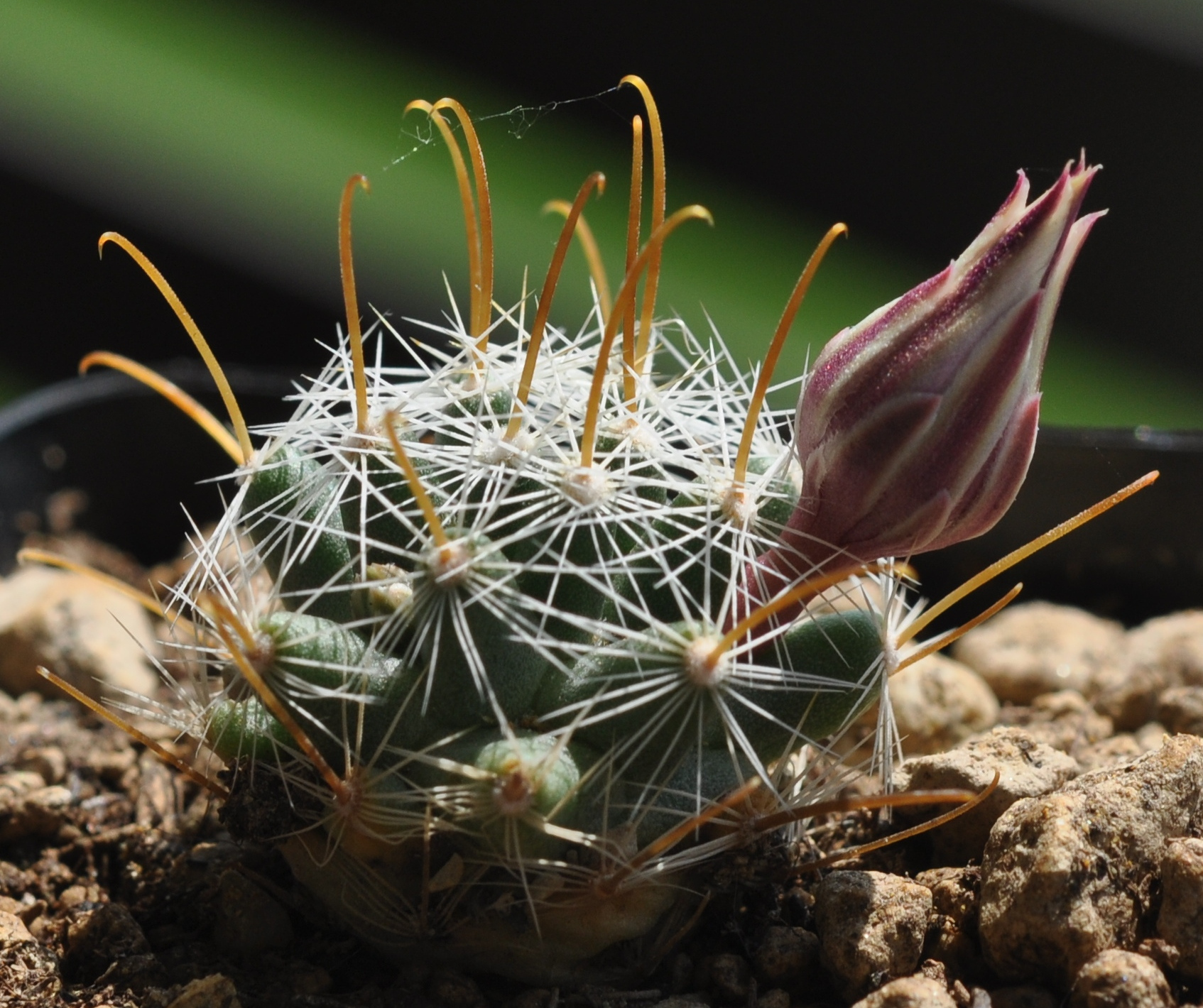
Bud

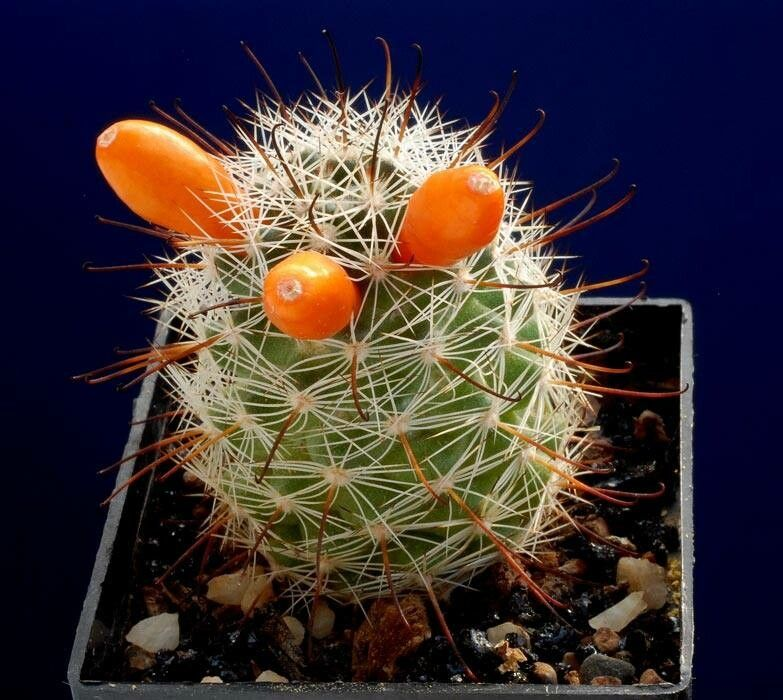
Fruits

== Distribution ==
This species is endemic to the Mexican state of Baja California, where it is found around the Bahía de los Ángeles and its neighboring islands such as Isla Angel de la Guarda, Isla de San Marcos, Isla Piojo, Isla Smith, and Isla La Ventana.

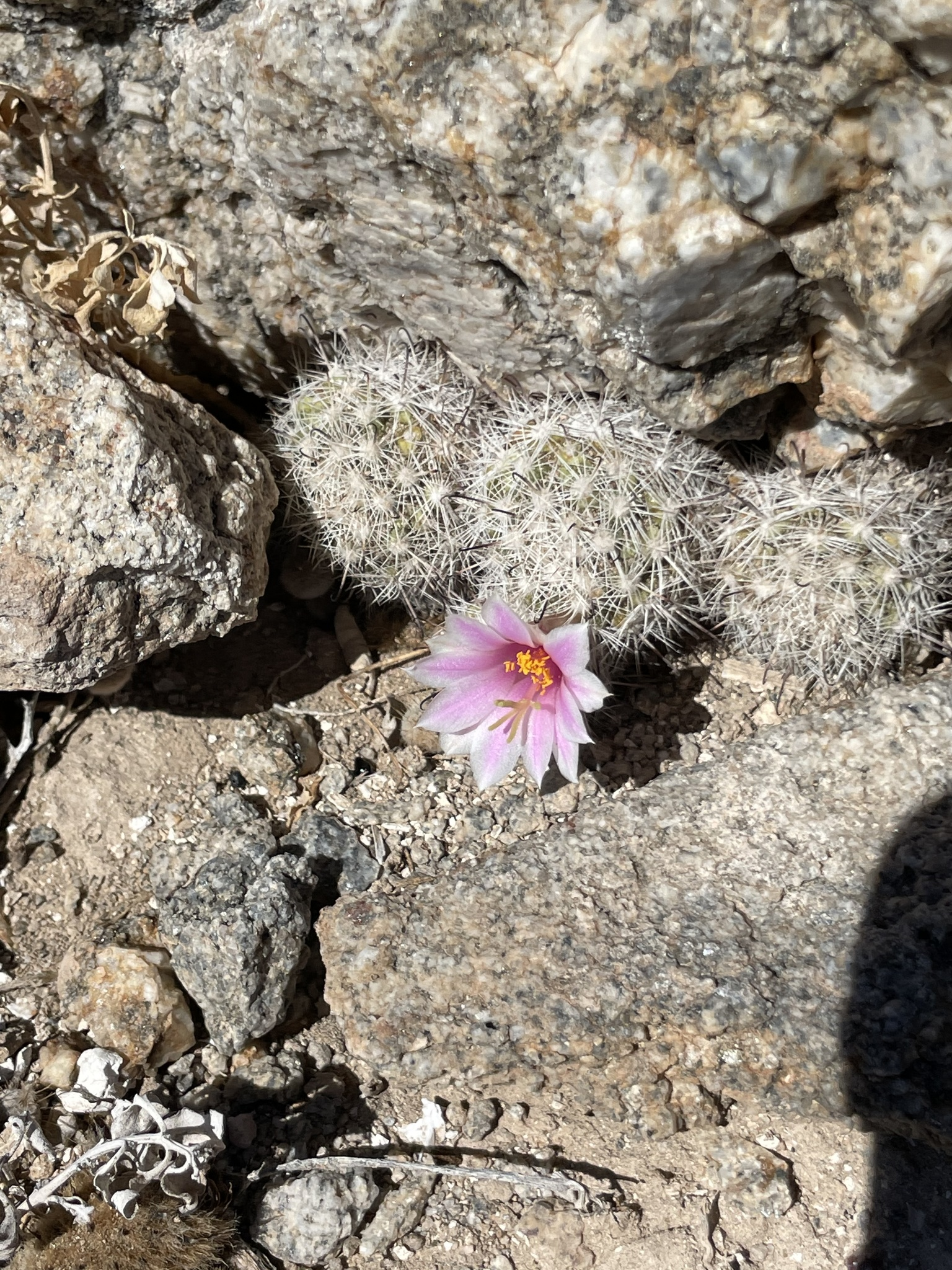
Habitat in El Pescador, Baja California, Mexico

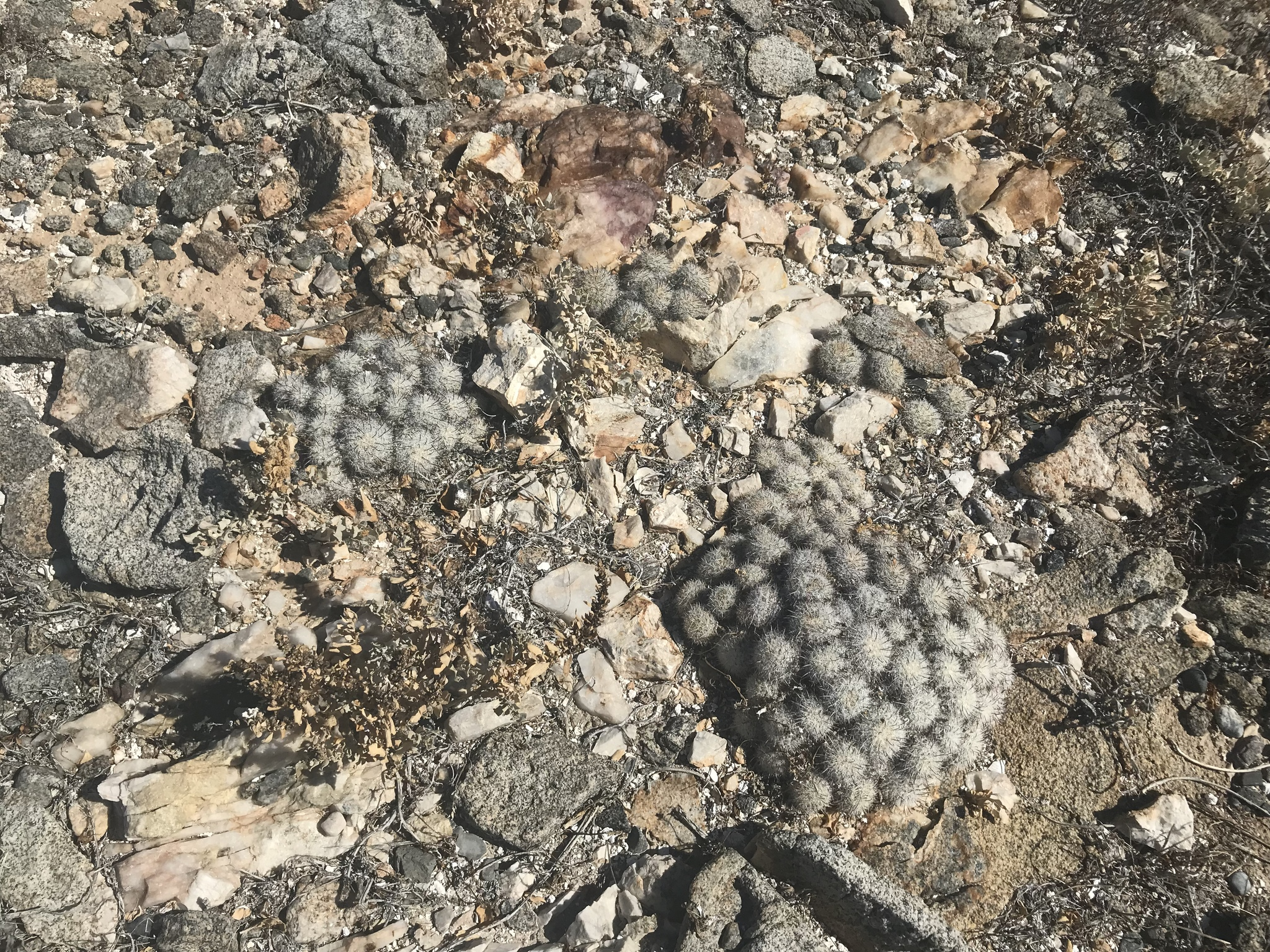
Habitat in Las Flores, Baja California, Mexico

== Taxonomy ==
Initially described as Mammillaria insularis in 1938 by Howard Elliott Gates, Cochemiea insularis was later reclassified into the genus Cochemiea by Peter B. Breslin and Lucas C. Majure in 2021.
