= White rattlesnake =

White rattlesnake may refer to:

- Crotalus mitchellii, a.k.a. the speckled rattlesnake, a venomous pitviper species found in the Southwestern United States, and in northern Mexico
- Crotalus lepidus, a.k.a. the rock rattlesnake, a venomous pitviper species found in the southwestern United States and northern central Mexico
