= Bahía de los Ángeles Airport =

Airport in Baja California, Mexico

- IATA: BHL; ICAO: MX12; LID: BAX

Summary
- Airport type: Public
- Serves: Bahía de los Ángeles, Baja California, Mexico
- Elevation AMSL: 34 ft / 10.3 m
- Coordinates: 28°58′38″N 113°33′38″W

Map

Runways
Direction	Length		Surface
Direction	m	ft	Surface
15/33	1,480	4,856	Asphalt

Bahía de los Ángeles Airport (IATA: BHL) is a paved airstrip located 2 miles North of Bahía de los Ángeles, Baja California, Mexico. It handles general aviation service for the town of Bahía de los Ángeles. There is a permanent military guard for the security of the facilities and the aircraft, although two aircraft were reported stolen from the airport, both in 2009.

== See also ==
- Bahía de los Ángeles
- Baja California
