= Isla Mitlan =

Island in Mexico

Isla Mitlán
- Location within Baja California Location within Mexico

Geography
- Location: Gulf of California
- Coordinates: 29°04′1.44″N 113°31′3.90″W
- Highest elevation: 30 m (100 ft)

Administration
- Mexico
- State: Baja California

Demographics
- Population: uninhabited

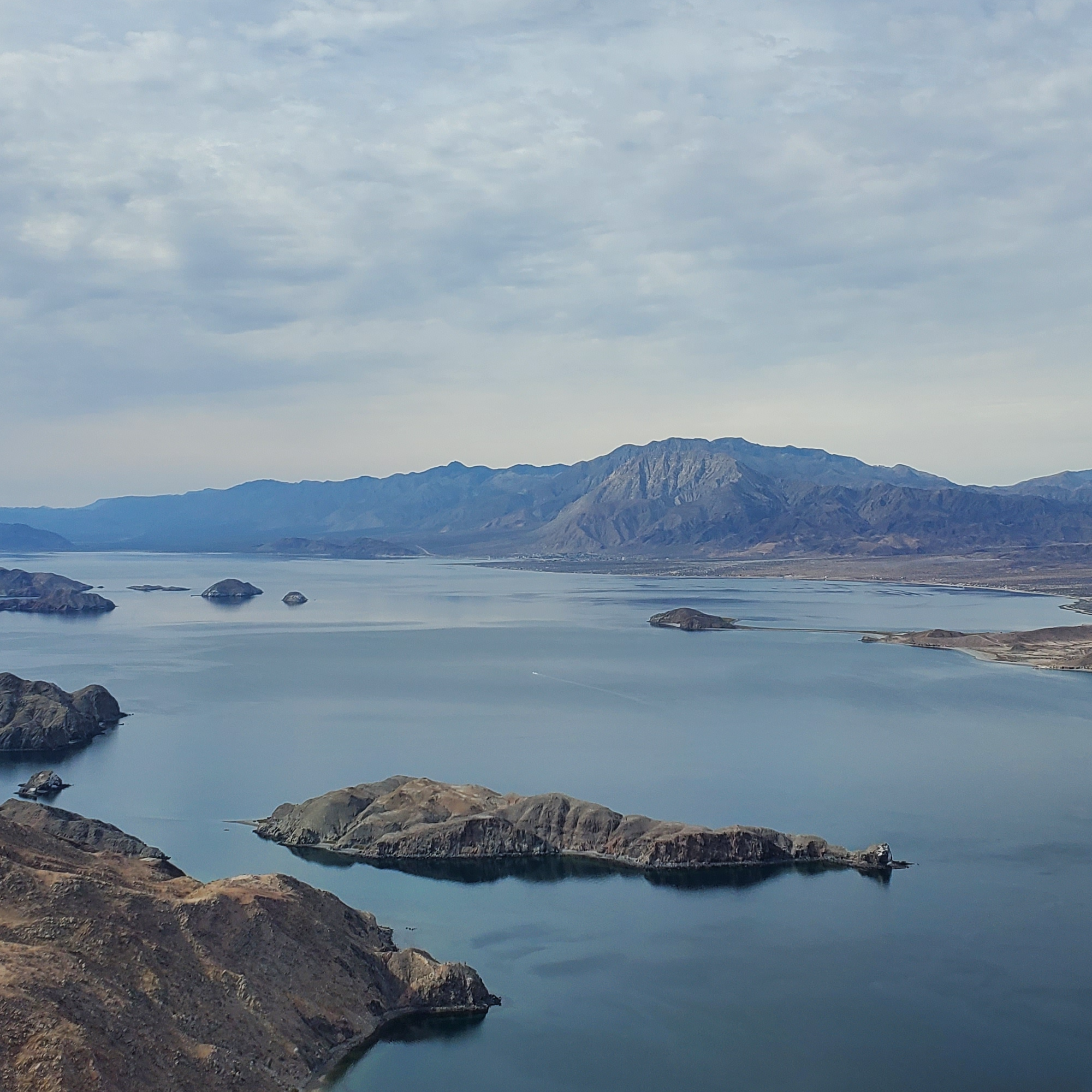
Isla Mitlán as viewed from the southern slope of Volcán Coronado. The island is in the foreground with Punta la Gringa and Bahía de los Ángeles behind.

Isla Mitlán, is an island in the Gulf of California, located within Bahía de los Ángeles east of the Baja California Peninsula. It is adjacent to the west coast of Isla Coronado.The island is uninhabited and is part of the Ensenada Municipality.

== Biology ==
Isla Mitlán has two species of reptile, including Sauromalus hispidus (Spiny Chuckwalla) and Uta stansburiana (Common Side-blotched Lizard).
