= Isla Cabeza de Caballo =

Island

- Location within Baja California Location within Mexico

Geography
- Location: Gulf of California
- Coordinates: 28°58′17.45″N 113°28′43.28″W
- State: Baja California

Demographics
- Population: uninhabited

Isla Cabeza de Caballo, or Head of the Horse, is an island in the Gulf of California, located within Bahía de los Ángeles east of the Baja California Peninsula. The island is uninhabited and is part of the municipality of San Quintín in Baja California. There is a lighthouse located on Isla Cabeza de Caballo along the channel into the harbor of Bahía de los Ángeles.

== Biology ==
Isla Cabeza de Caballo has four species of reptiles: Crotalus mitchellii (speckled rattlesnake), C. polisi (horsehead island rattlesnake) Sauromalus hispidus (spiny chuckwalla), and Uta stansburiana (common side-blotched lizard).
