= Isla Cerraja =

- Location within Baja California Location within Mexico

Geography
- Location: Gulf of California
- Coordinates: 28°59′48.33″N 113°31′9.10″W
- Highest elevation: 15 m (49 ft)

Administration
- Mexico
- State: Baja California

Demographics
- Population: uninhabited

Isla Cerraja, or the Lock, is an island in the Gulf of California, located within Bahía de los Angeles off of the Baja California Peninsula. The island is uninhabited and is part of the Ensenada Municipality.

== Biology ==
Isla Cerraja has only one species of reptile, the Common Side-blotched Lizard (Uta stansburiana).
