= Dead side-blotched lizard =

Conservation status
- Vulnerable (IUCN 3.1)

Scientific classification
- Kingdom: Animalia
- Phylum: Chordata
- Class: Reptilia
- Order: Squamata
- Suborder: Iguania
- Family: Phrynosomatidae
- Genus: Uta
- Species: U. lowei

Binomial name
- Uta lowei L. Grismer, 1994

Species of lizard

The dead side-blotched lizard (Uta lowei), also known commonly as the El Muerto side-blotched lizard and la mancha lateral muerta in Mexican Spanish, is a species of lizard in the subfamily Sceloporinae of the family Phrynosomatidae. The species is endemic to Isla El Muerto, an island in the Gulf of California, Mexico.

== Etymology ==
The specific name, lowei, is in honor of American herpetologist Charles Herbert Lowe.

== Description ==
Uta lowei has strongly keeled dorsal scales, and is light gray to off-white ventrally. Adult males have a dorsal pattern of offset paravertebral dark blotches, with a dense network of turquoise spots.

== Habitat ==
The preferred natural habitat of Uta lowei is rocky areas of the marine intertidal zone, but it has also been found in rocky areas of inland desert.

== Diet ==
Uta lowei preys predominately upon isopods.

== Reproduction ==
Uta lowei is oviparous.
