= Isla Bota =

Island in the Gulf of California

- Location within Baja California Location within Mexico

Geography
- Location: Gulf of California
- Coordinates: 29°00′38.69″N 113°30′51.92″W
- Highest elevation: 30 m (100 ft)

Administration
- Mexico
- State: Baja California

Demographics
- Population: uninhabited

Isla Bota, or the Boot, is an island in the Gulf of California, located within Bahía de los Ángeles east of the Baja California Peninsula. The island is uninhabited and part of the Ensenada Municipality.

== Biology ==
Isla Bota has only one species of reptile, Uta stansburiana (common side-blotched lizard).
