= Isla Flecha =

Island in the Gulf of California

- Location within Mexico

Geography
- Location: Gulf of California
- Coordinates: 29°00′18.78″N 113°31′20.28″W
- Highest elevation: 50 m (160 ft)

Administration
- Mexico
- State: Baja California

Demographics
- Population: uninhabited

Isla Flecha, or the Arrow, a.k.a. Isla El Borrego, is an island in the Gulf of California, located within Bahía de los Angeles east of the Baja California Peninsula. The island is uninhabited and is part of the Ensenada Municipality.

== Biology ==
Isla Flecha has two species of reptile, Sauromalus hispidus (Spiny Chuckwalla) and Uta stansburiana (Common Side-blotched Lizard).
