= Isla Pata =

Island in the Gulf of California

- Location within Baja California Location within Mexico

Geography
- Location: Gulf of California
- Coordinates: 29°00′51.64″N 113°30′50.85″W
- Highest elevation: 35 m (115 ft)

Administration
- Mexico
- State: Baja California

Demographics
- Population: uninhabited

Isla Pata, the paw or foot, is an island in the Gulf of California, located within Bahía de los Angeles off the coast of the Baja California Peninsula. The island is uninhabited and is part of the Ensenada Municipality.

== Biology ==
Isla Pata has only one species of reptile, the Common Side-blotched Lizard (Uta stansburiana).
