= Crotalus mitchellii muertensis =

Conservation status
- Least Concern (IUCN 3.1)

Scientific classification
- Kingdom: Animalia
- Phylum: Chordata
- Class: Reptilia
- Order: Squamata
- Suborder: Serpentes
- Family: Viperidae
- Genus: Crotalus
- Species: C. mitchellii
- Subspecies: C. m. muertensis

Trinomial name
- Crotalus mitchellii muertensis Klauber, 1949

Synonyms
- Crotalus mitchellii muertensis Klauber, 1949; Crotalus mitchelli [sic] muertensis – Klauber, 1949; Crotalus mitchellii muertensis – McCrystal & McCoid, 1986

Subspecies of snake

Common names: El Muerto Island speckled rattlesnake.

Crotalus mitchellii muertensis is a venomous pitviper subspecies endemic to El Muerto Island, Mexico. It is sometimes treated as a full species, Crotalus muertensis.

== Description ==
A dwarfed form, adults grow to a maximum length of 63.7 centimetres (25.1 in).

== Geographic range ==
Known only from the type locality, which is "El Muerto Island, Gulf of California, Mexico."

== Habitat ==
It is common in all habitats within the El Muerto Island: rocks and rubble of talus slopes, scrub, hill ridges, and the intertidal zone.

== Conservation status ==
This species is classified as Least Concern (LC) on the IUCN Red List of Threatened Species. Species are listed as such due to their wide distribution, presumed large population, or because it is unlikely to be declining fast enough to qualify for listing in a more threatened category.
