= Isla Coronado =

Island in Baja California, Mexico

- Location within Baja California Location within Mexico

Geography
- Location: Gulf of California
- Coordinates: 29°04′26.19″N 113°30′31.34″W
- Highest elevation: 431 m (1414 ft)

Administration
- Mexico
- State: Baja California Norte

Demographics
- Population: uninhabited

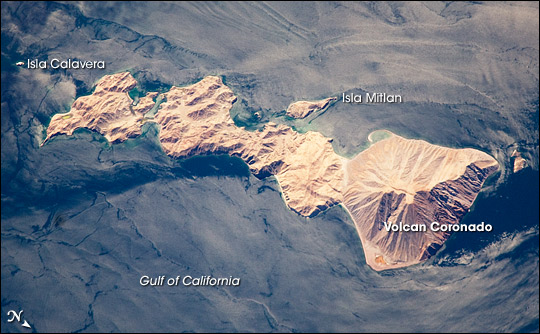
Coronado Island and the Gulf of California, Mexico

Isla Coronado, occasionally referred to as “Smith Island”, is just off the eastern shoreline of Mexico's Baja California Peninsula near Bahía de los Ángeles in the Gulf of California. The island is approximately 7 kilometers long and it is dominated by a volcano on its northern end. It is part of the Ensenada Municipality.

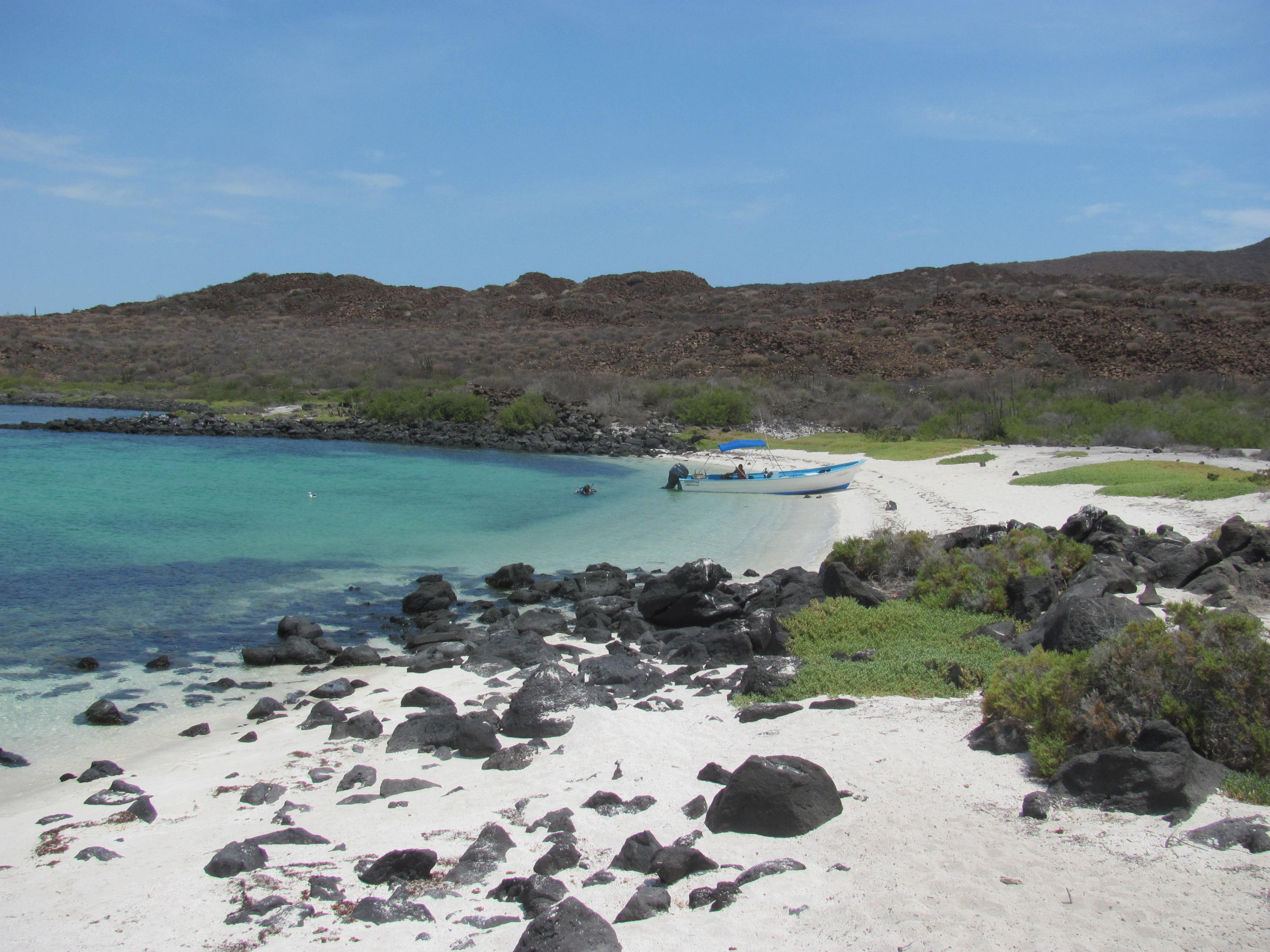
Isla Coronado in the Sea of Cortez

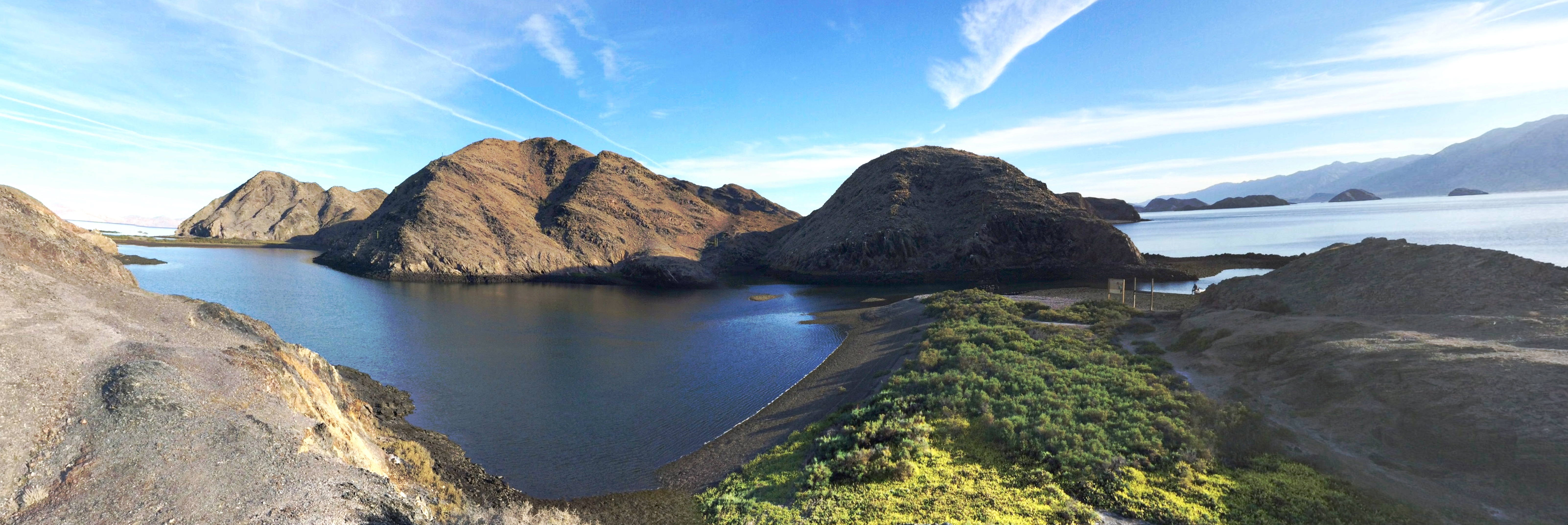
Tortuga Bay, Isla Coronado

== Environment ==
Isla Coronado — similar to nearby Isla Coronadito, Isla Mitlan and Isla Calavera - has an arid climate and is sparsely vegetated. Despite the harshness of the environment, sea lion colonies can be found on the island. Partly in response to increased environmental pressure on the islands from both fishing and tourism, local groups developed a management and conservation plan for the islands in the bay, with international support, in the late 1990s.

=== Volcano ===
Coronado (Spanish: Volcán Coronado) is a 1,554 ft (474 m) stratovolcano on the island. The date of the last eruption of the volcano is not known, but gas and steam activity was last recorded in 1539.

=== Biology ===
The island has seven species of reptiles: Aspidoscelis tigris (tiger whiptail), Callisaurus draconoides (zebra-tailed lizard), Crotalus mitchellii (speckled rattlesnake), Hypsiglena ochrorhyncha (coast night snake), Phyllodactylus nocticolus (peninsular leaf-toed gecko), Sauromalus hispidus (spiny chuckwalla), and Uta stansburiana (common side-blotched lizard).

=== Marine life ===
The island is an important piece of the ecology of the Gulf of California. In 1940, marine biologist Ed Ricketts, together with his friend, author John Steinbeck, conducted an expedition and collecting trip in the Gulf of California (sometimes known as the Sea of Cortez) to explore the rich ecology of the intertidal zone. Coronado Island and the Bahía de los Ángeles were part of that expedition. The resulting book by Steinbeck and Ricketts, The Log from the Sea of Cortez, remains a classic document of the natural history and ecology of the Gulf of California. Today, the uninhabited island is a refuge with a rich marine assemblage, especially when compared to other, unprotected parts of the Gulf. This image provides hints of the diverse marine environment around the island. Most of the coast is steep and rocky, but lighter blue lagoons, especially along the western coast, provide shallower, protected environments that are biologically robust. Offshore, internal waves and complex surface currents facilitate mixing of the water, important for nutrient delivery to the coastal environments. These water patterns are outlined by sunglint (light reflecting off of the water surface back towards the camera on board the International Space Station). The sunglint patterns are due to wind and currents, which roughen the water surface and enhance reflection, and surfactants that decrease the surface tension and roughness, resulting in regions of dark, smooth water.
