= Isla Calavera =

- Location within Baja California Location within Mexico

Geography
- Location: Gulf of California
- Coordinates: 29°01′39.60″N 113°29′55.50″W
- Highest elevation: 30 m (100 ft)

Administration
- Mexico
- State: Baja California

Demographics
- Population: uninhabited

Isla Calavera, or the Skull, is an island in the Gulf of California, located within Bahía de los Ángeles east of the Baja California Peninsula. The island is uninhabited and is part of the Ensenada Municipality. It is named skull due to a covering of Guano everywhere except three portions that, from some angles, give the appearance of eye and nose sockets. Sights and sounds from the island contribute to fisherman telling tales of "The Skull". Its northern shore is home to a sea lion colony.
