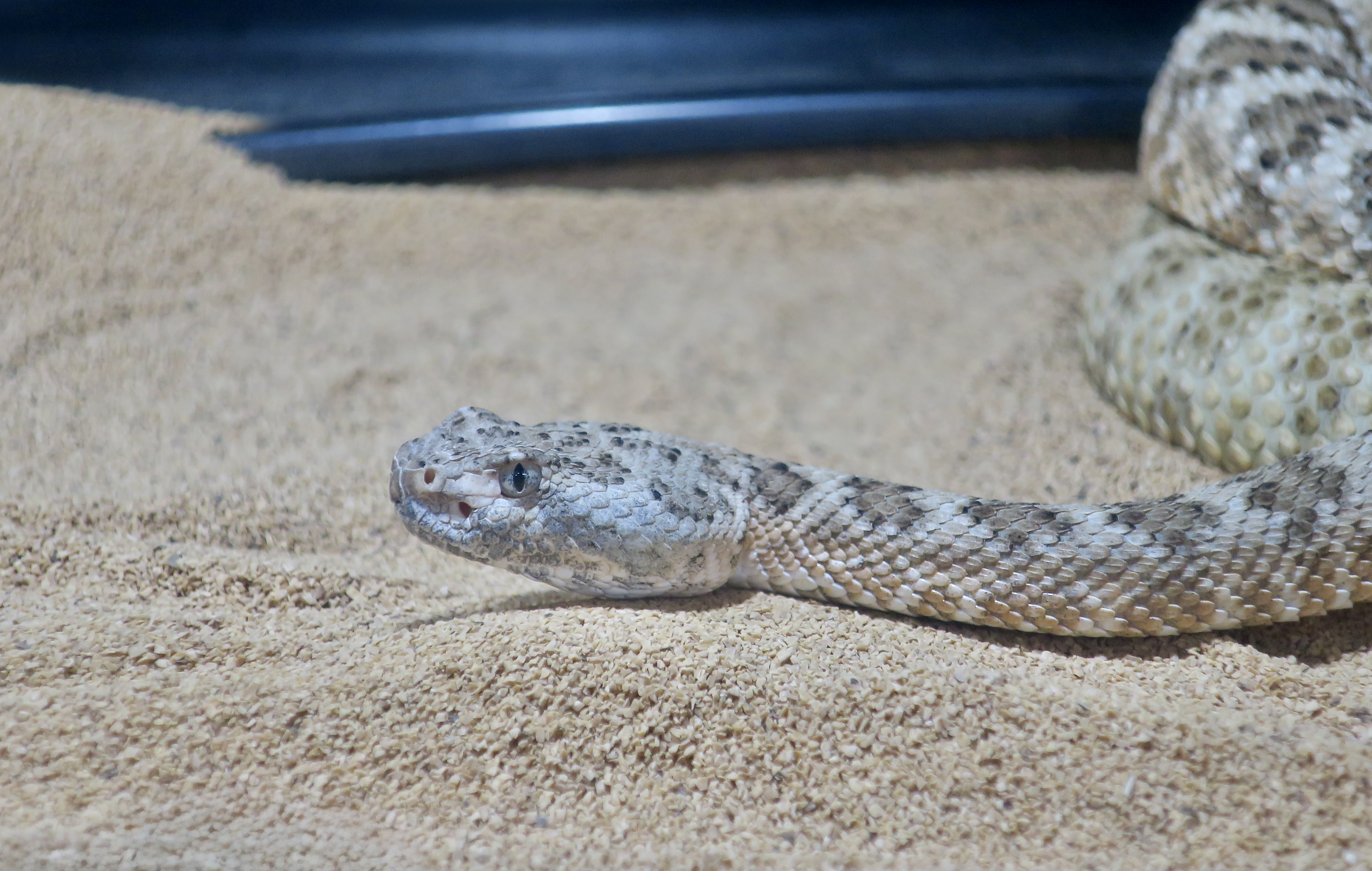

Conservation status
- Least Concern (IUCN 3.1)

Scientific classification
- Domain: Eukaryota
- Kingdom: Animalia
- Phylum: Chordata
- Class: Reptilia
- Order: Squamata
- Suborder: Serpentes
- Family: Viperidae
- Genus: Crotalus
- Species: C. angelensis

Binomial name
- Crotalus angelensis Klauber, 1963
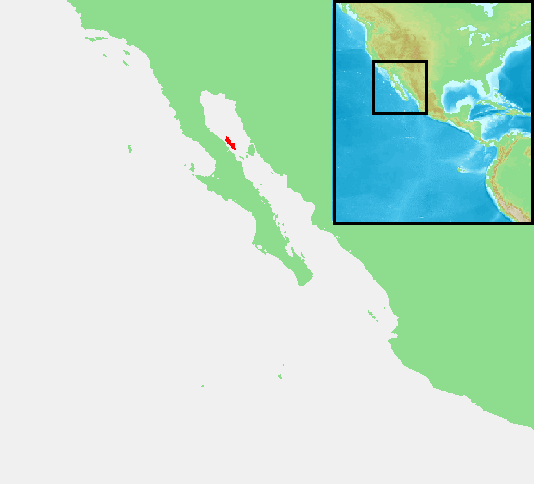
- Location of Ángel de la Guarda Island

Synonyms
- Crotalus angelensis Klauber, 1963; Crotalus mitchellii angelicus – Hoge, 1966; Crotalus mitchellii angelensis – Hoge & Romano-Hoge, 1981; Crotalus mitchellii angelensis – McCrystal & McCoid, 1986

= Crotalus angelensis =

Species of snake

Crotalus angelensis, or the Ángel de la Guarda Island speckled rattlesnake, is a pit viper species endemic to Isla Ángel de la Guarda in the Gulf of California, Mexico. Like all other pitvipers, it is venomous. It is sometimes treated as a subspecies of Crotalus mitchellii.

== Description ==
Grows to a maximum size of 137 centimetres (4 ft 6 in).

== Geographic range ==
Found only on Isla Ángel de la Guarda in the Gulf of California, Mexico. The type locality given is "about 4 miles [6 km] southeast of Refugio Bay, at 1,500 feet [460 m] elevation, Isla Ángel de la Guarda, Gulf of California, Mexico (near 29°29½'N, 113°33'W)".

== Habitat ==
Gravelly beaches along the shore; rocky arroyos, washes, and on the hillsides of the island's interior, from sea-level up to 500 m.

== Conservation status ==
This species is classified as "Least Concern" (LC) on the IUCN Red List of Threatened Species. It occurs in a protected area and is very abundant within its small range.
