= Bahía de los Ángeles =

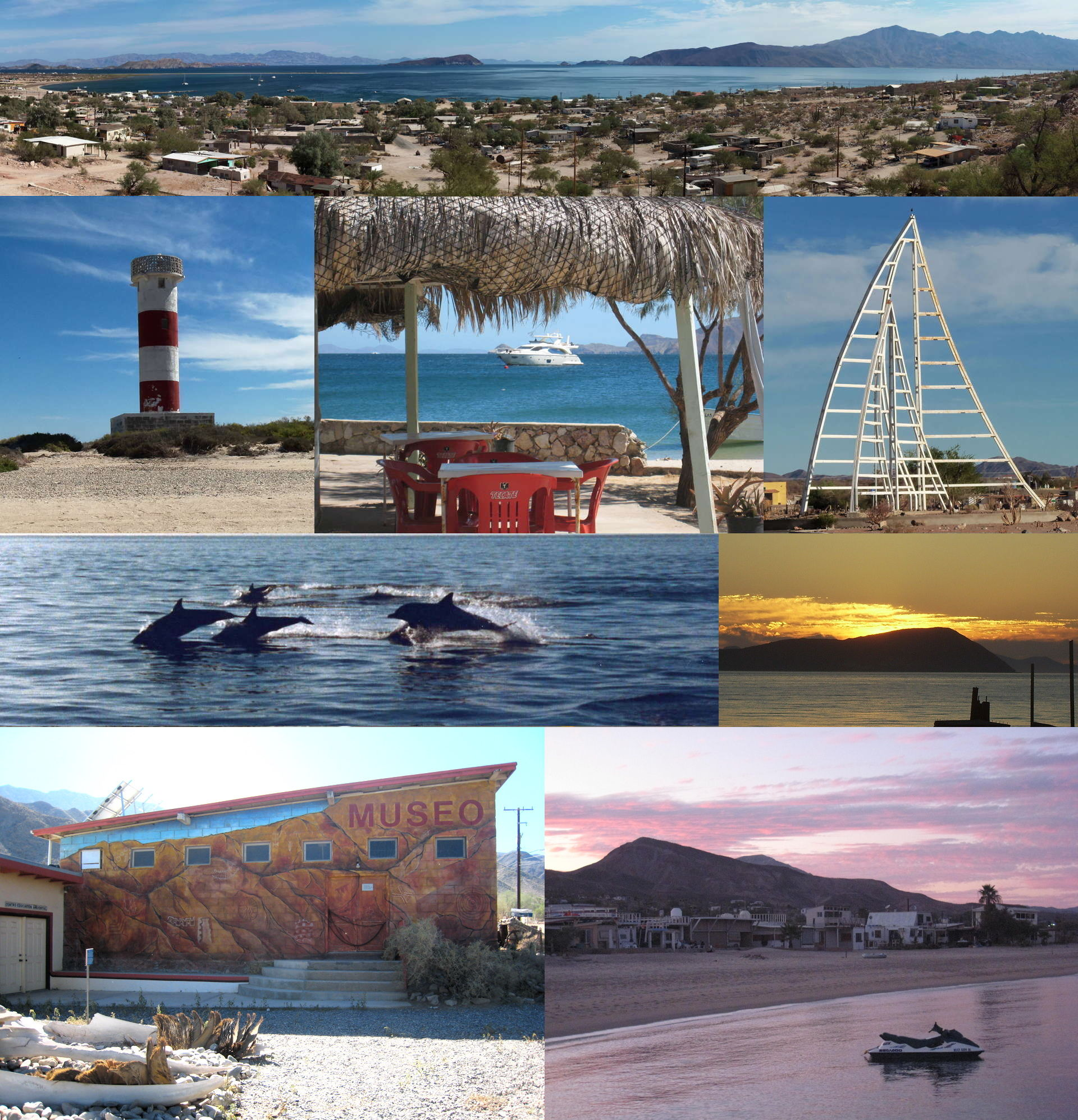
- From top down: panorama of the bahia, Punta Arenas Lighthouse, harbor view, Sail Sculpture, dolphins, sunrise over Cabeza de Caballo, Museo de Naturaleza y Cultura, sunset behind Sierra de San Borja
- Nicknames: Bay of L.A., L.A. Bay. BoLa
- Location in Mexico Bahía de los Ángeles (Mexico)
- Coordinates: 28°56′53″N 113°33′37.44″W
- Country: Mexico
- State: Baja California
- Municipality: San Quintín
- Established (Spain): 1746
- Elevation: 26 ft (8 m)

Population (2010)
  - City: 800
  - Urban: 590
- Time zone: UTC-8 (Northwest (US PST))
  - Summer (DST): UTC-7 (Northwest)
- Website: www.bahiadelosangeles.org

Bahía de los Ángeles (Spanish for 'Bay of the Angels') is a coastal bay on the Gulf of California, located along the eastern shore of the Baja California Peninsula in the state of Baja California, Mexico. The town of the same name is located at the east end of Federal Highway 12 about 42 miles (68 km) from the Parador Punta Prieta junction on Federal Highway 1. The area is part of the San Quintín Municipality.

According to the 2020 INEGI census, Bahía de los Ángeles had a population of 781.

Tourism, especially ecotourism and nature education, is very important to the community of Bahía de Los Ángeles. There is combined natural history museum and cultural history museum in the community. This small town is the headquarters for access to the many islands of this part of the northern Sea of Cortez and is noteworthy for the World Heritage Site designation by the United Nations.

== History ==
The area was known as Adac to the Cochimí people, the aboriginal inhabitants of the central part of the Baja California peninsula. In the early 1600s approximately 3000 Cochimi were inhabiting the area.

In 1539 Francisco de Ulloa was the first European to discover the Bay in what was the final expedition financed by Hernán Cortés. The area known then as the Bahía de Lobos (Bay of Sea Lions) was explored again in 1746 by the Jesuit missionary Fernando Consag during his attempt to investigate the disputed question involving the Island of California. Consag is credited with giving the area its current name. In 1752, a loading dock was built to explore Mission San Borja and the entire Baja California Peninsula.

After the departure of the Jesuits from the Baja Missions, the surrounding settlements, known at the time as visitas ("visiting chapels"), were gradually taken over by the locals, Bahia being one of them. By 1880, the interest in precious metals had spread to the Bahia region. In 1900, another loading dock was built to export gold and silver obtained from the mines of Sierra San Borja, San Juan, and Santa Martha. The San Juan silver mine at Las Flores became the largest producing mine in all of Baja. The mine was connected to the Bahia by an eight-mile narrow-gauge railroad (13 km), which allowed the ore to be transferred to the port there. The value of the silver produced by the mine was estimated (in 2002) to be 2 million U.S. dollars.

In the mid-20th century, only a handful of families were residing there. Among those were the Daggetts (the children and grandchildren of Englishman Dick Daggett Sr.), the family of Jose "Tilongo" Smith, the Ocañas, Navarros, and Corderos. Señor Antero "Papa" Diaz (1914–1989) was the leading citizen of the pueblo known as Bahía de los Ángeles. Diaz and his wife, Cruz Rosas Ortiz "Mama" Diaz, originated in Mexico City and came to the bahia to work the mine at Las Flores. Diaz became Delegado del Gobierno (Mayor) and built the first schoolhouse and the first church in Bahia. He was also instrumental in establishing the town as a sport fishing resort by building a hotel and an airstrip. This allowed fishermen to reach the bahia by air without making the 3 day drive from Ensenada. The original "Casa Diaz" hotel consisted of Mama's restaurant and 6 cabins with primitive showers.

In his book, The Log from the Sea of Cortez, author John Steinbeck wrote of his stay in Bahía de los Ángeles, the last stop on the peninsula before rounding Isla Ángel de la Guarda.

Bahia is also the home of the "Museo de Naturaleza y Cultura", established in 1988 by American Carolina Shepard and built by volunteers. It is a simple building decorated with reproductions of local cave paintings and located near the town square and municipal offices. It houses an eclectic collection of artifacts ranging from mining equipment and Indian artifacts to examples of local marine life and photographs of notable historical citizens. A 30-foot-long skeleton of a juvenile gray whale, assembled by students from Ensenada, hangs from the ceiling. Of the 600 species of shells in the Sea of Cortés, the museum's collection contains 500. There is even a photograph of Mama Diaz next to Charles Lindbergh. Lindbergh had stopped in 1965 during his flight to Laguna San Ignacio to see the gray whales.

== Environment ==
The area has a desert climate. At the bay's north end lies Punta la Gringa and Playa Rincon to the south. To the west is the Sierra de San Borja responsible for the occasional hot, dry winds known locally as "Westies" which can go from zero to over 50 knots in a matter of minutes. On the eastern horizon lies Isla Ángel de la Guarda separated from the other islands by the Canal de las Ballenas. There is an Archipelago of 16 islands off the coast and in the bay.

16 Islands in Bahia de los Angeles
Name	Location	Height	Size
Isla Coronado (aka. Smith Island)	29°04′26.19″N 113°30′31.34″W	1,554	1
Isla La Ventana – The Window	28°59′46.09″N 113°30′35.08″W	112	2
Isla Cabeza de Caballo – Head of the Horse	28°58′17.45″N 113°28′43.28″W	331	3
Isla Piojo – Louce	29°01′4.43″N 113°27′54.58″W	223	4
Isla Mitlan	29°04′1.44″N 113°31′3.90″W	tbd	5
Isla Coronadito – Volcano (diminutive)	29°05′54.30″N 113°31′43.10″W	tbd	6
Isla Flecha – The Arrow	29°00′18.78″N 113°31′20.28″W	203	7
Isla Pata – The Paw	29°00′51.64″N 113°30′50.85″W	tbd	8
Isla Bota – The Boot	29°00′38.69″N 113°30′51.92″W	100	9
Isla Jorobado – The Hunchback aka. El Borrego - The Sheep	29°00′43.90″N 113°31′27.50″W	tbd	10
Isla Cerraja – The Lock	28°59′48.33″N 113°31′9.10″W	49	11
Isla Llave – The Key	28°59′56.10″N 113°31′13.80″W	tbd	14
Isla Calavera – The Skull	29°01′39.60″N 113°29′55.50″W	100	12
Isla San Amemar aka Isla Rasita	29°00′52.30″N 113°30′19.40″W	tbd	13
Islas Twins aka Islas Los Gemelitos	28°57′20.10″N 113°28′43.70″W	49	15 & 16

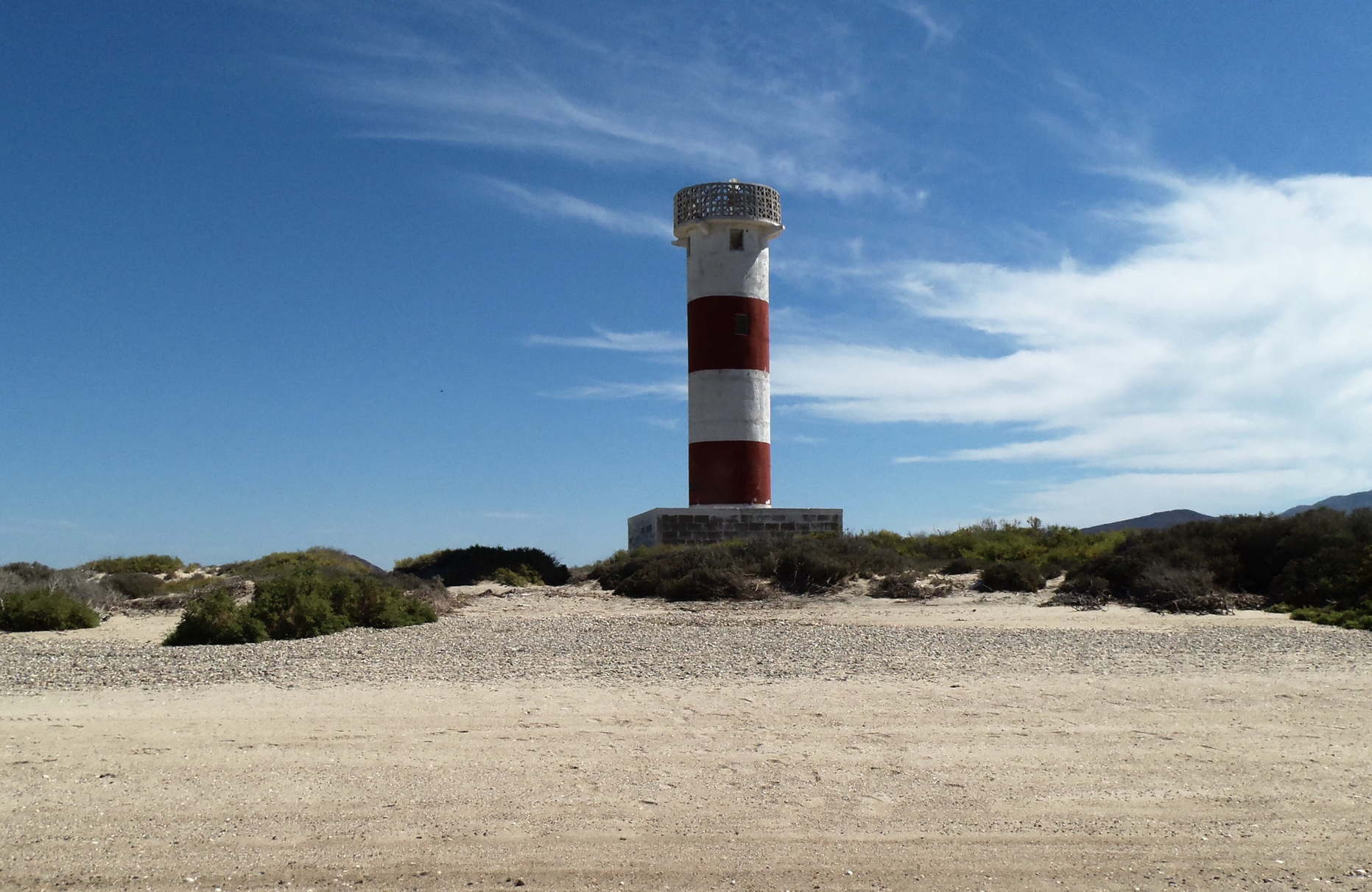
Faro Punta Arenas. 28.955906°N 113.452708°W

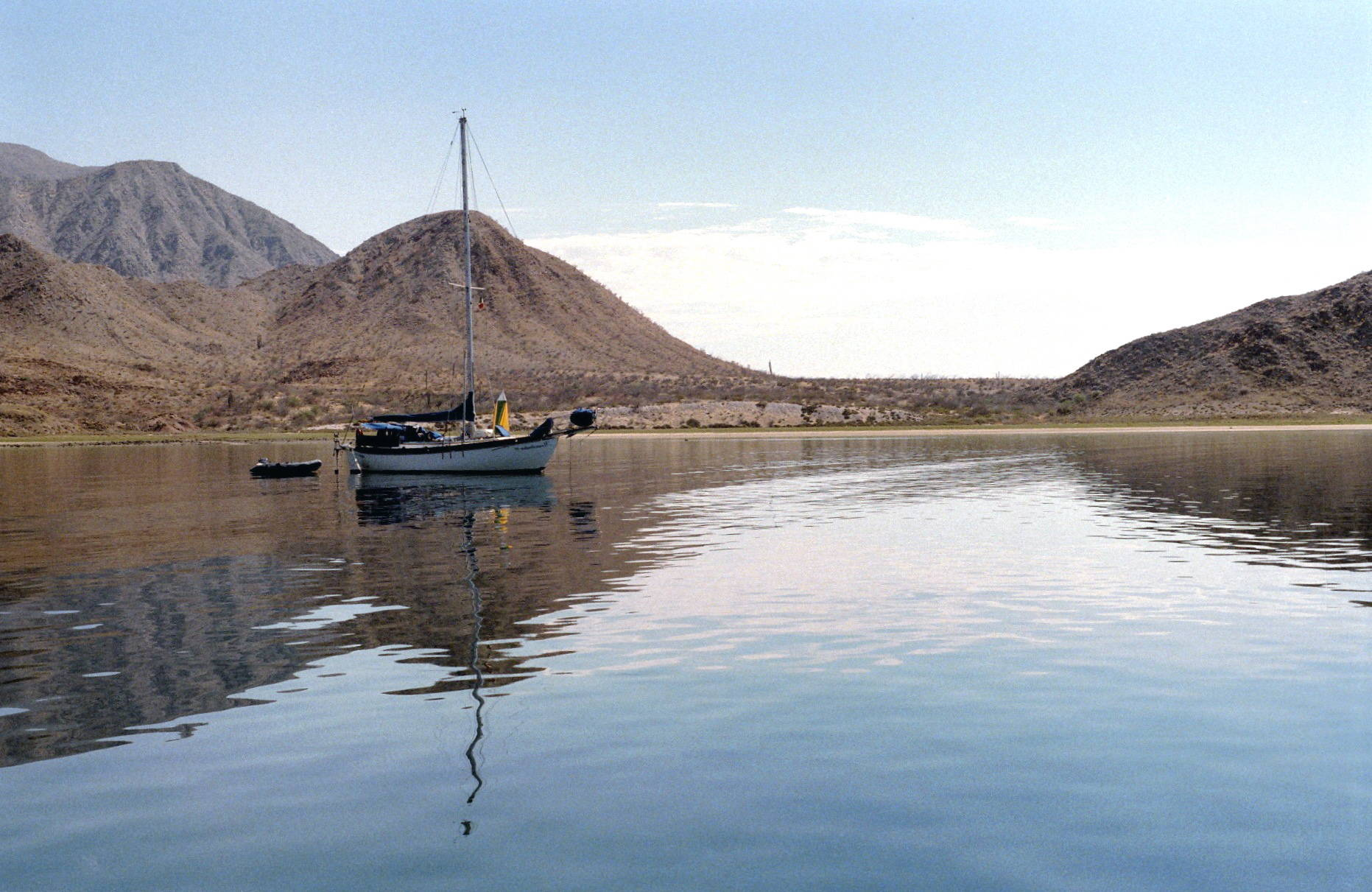
Puerto Don Juan: Safe harbor. 28.942740°N 113.451154°W

There is a lighthouse on Isla Cabeza de Caballo, an island in the center of the channel into the town. A second lighthouse is located at the entrance to the harbor on Punta Arenas, a sand spit partially sheltering the waterfront of Bahía.

Bahia is notable as an anchorage and safe harbor. The nearby Don Juan Cove is another ideal safe harbor.

=== Biosphere Reserve ===
In 2007, Mexican President Felipe Calderón, in cooperation with the nongovernmental organization Pronatura Noreste, Mexico’s National Commission for Protected Areas, the Global Conservation Fund (GCF), and others, established the Bahía de los Ángeles Biosphere Reserve to protect the unique ecology of the region. It covers an area of almost 1500 square miles (387,956 hectares) and includes a portion of the Baja coastline, all 16 islands, numerous smaller islands and islets and the Canal de Salsipuedes and Canal de las Ballenas. The reserve protects a diverse marine population including many endangered species including whale sharks, fin whales, California sea lions and five species of sea turtle. The reserve is within the UNESCO "Islands and Protected Areas of the Gulf of California" Mexican World Heritage Site.

=== Climate ===
Climate data for Bahia de los Angeles (1991–2020)
Month	Jan	Feb	Mar	Apr	May	Jun	Jul	Aug	Sep	Oct	Nov	Dec	Year
Record high °C (°F)	32 (90)	35 (95)	38 (100)	40 (104)	42 (108)	44 (111)	49 (120)	44 (111)	44 (111)	44 (111)	39 (102)	34 (93)	49 (120)
Mean daily maximum °C (°F)	21.0 (69.8)	21.9 (71.4)	24.6 (76.3)	27.6 (81.7)	31.3 (88.3)	34.8 (94.6)	36.7 (98.1)	36.3 (97.3)	35.0 (95.0)	30.9 (87.6)	25.6 (78.1)	21.3 (70.3)	28.9 (84.0)
Daily mean °C (°F)	15.3 (59.5)	16.1 (61.0)	18.3 (64.9)	20.9 (69.6)	24.2 (75.6)	27.7 (81.9)	30.8 (87.4)	30.9 (87.6)	29.5 (85.1)	24.9 (76.8)	20.2 (68.4)	16.1 (61.0)	22.9 (73.2)
Mean daily minimum °C (°F)	9.6 (49.3)	10.4 (50.7)	11.9 (53.4)	14.1 (57.4)	17.1 (62.8)	20.7 (69.3)	24.9 (76.8)	25.5 (77.9)	23.9 (75.0)	18.9 (66.0)	14.8 (58.6)	10.9 (51.6)	16.9 (62.4)
Record low °C (°F)	1 (34)	3 (37)	0 (32)	5 (41)	8 (46)	7 (45)	10 (50)	14 (57)	8 (46)	8 (46)	2 (36)	4 (39)	0 (32)
Average precipitation mm (inches)	8.8 (0.35)	8.5 (0.33)	5.6 (0.22)	1.2 (0.05)	0.0 (0.0)	1.4 (0.06)	1.7 (0.07)	3.5 (0.14)	12.1 (0.48)	7.9 (0.31)	6.0 (0.24)	11.5 (0.45)	68.2 (2.7)
Average rainy days	2.4	2.2	1.4	0.6	0.0	0.2	1.1	1.3	1.7	1.2	1.4	2.1	15.6
Source 1: SERVICIO METEOROLÓGICO NACIONAL
Source 2: SERVICIO METEOROLÓGICO NACIONAL

== Economy ==
Overfishing of the region has made it increasingly difficult for residents to support themselves. The local economy is shifting from commercial fishing to guided sports fishing and other forms of tourism. Bahia is home to perhaps a dozen pangueros (panga operators) who specialize in sport fishing. Before the highway into the area was paved, the town was known as a drug transit point on the way to the United States. In 2007, power lines from Guerrero Negro were completed, ending reliance on diesel generators. There is internet access via satellite. The Baja 1000 passes through town every other year. The Bahía de los Ángeles Airport is just north of the town.

=== Tourism ===
Bay of LA is popular for activities such as kayaking, windsurfing, and tourism, in addition to being a sports fisherman's paradise, famous for its fabulous fishing. The most common game fish is yellowtail (jurel), a type of sport fish that lives off the shore of California and Mexico. Yellowtail from this region can grow up to 5 feet long and weigh up to 100 pounds. Other sport fish from this region include sea bass (cabrilla), snapper (pargo), grouper, sierra, bonito and the occasional mahi-mahi (dorado). Non-sport fish like triggerfish, barracuda and others exist in abundance. There are two colonies of the California sea lion population, one on Isla Calavera near Isla Coronado known locally as "Smith Island", and Isla El Racito, within Ensenada El Alacran. The bay is also famous for its whale sharks (Tiburón Ballena) with 20 to 30 visiting the area each summer.

About 15 – 20 miles west of town are the prehistoric rock paintings of Montevideo, part of the Great Mural region considered to be one of the most important archaeological sites in Baja California. Known officially as Pinturas Rupestres de Valle Montevideo they are estimated by some to be 10,000 years old.

=== Conservation ===
Marine biologist Antonio Resendiz (RIP) ran a sea turtle research facility, known as Campo Archelon, north of town. The area around Bahia de los Angeles provides nesting grounds for many species of sea turtles. Beginning in 1979 the officially named "Centro Regional de Investigacion Pesquera (CRIP)" had conducted sea turtle research and conservation. Antonio, who studied marine biology at the University of Ensenada, established the research station first with the help of the Mexican Institute of Fishing and later through the help of American biochemist Dr. Grant Bartlett. Antonio made news in 1995 when one of his turtles, a 213-pound loggerhead named Adelita, was discovered off the coast of Japan by local fishermen. The discovery established the migration path of loggerheads for the first time.

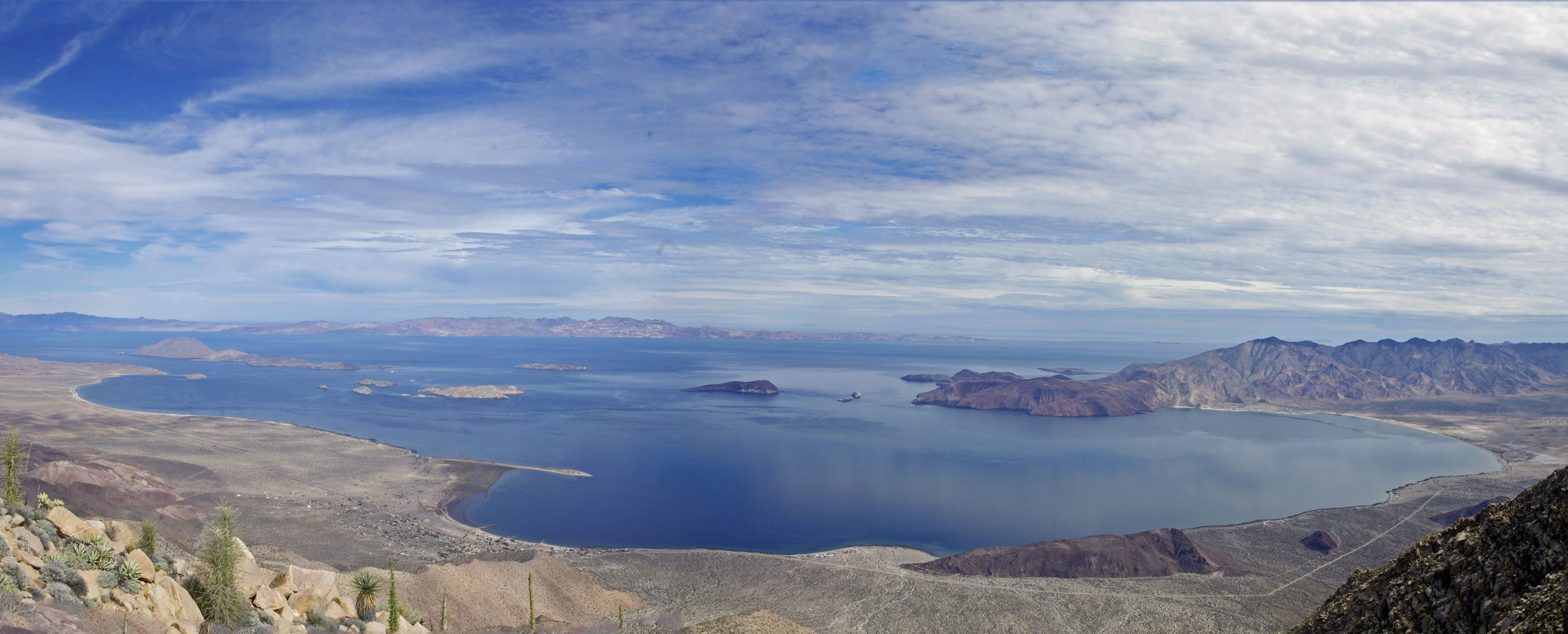
View of Bahía de los Ángeles from atop Mikes Mountain to the west of the town. 28.922951°N 113.586812°W
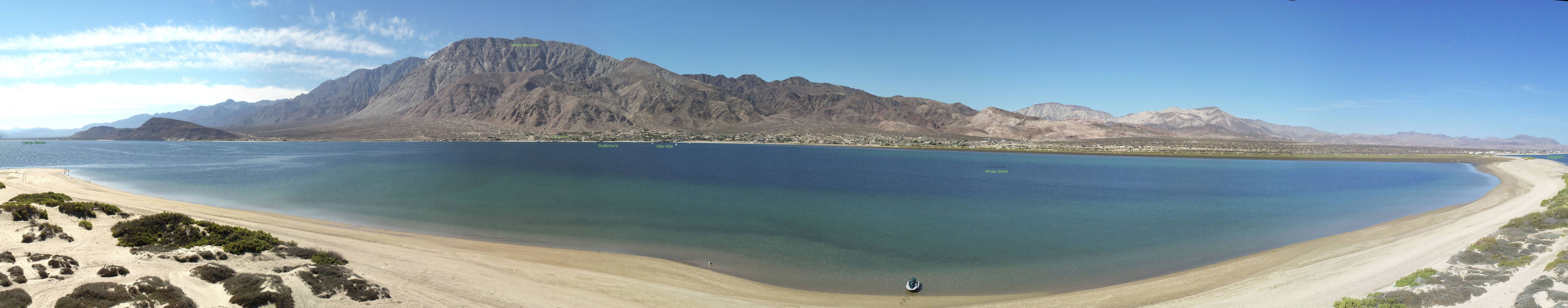
Panoramic view of Bahía de los Ángeles from Punta Arenas Lighthouse with Mikes Mountains in the background. 28.955900°N 113.542709°W
