= Isla La Ventana =

Island in the Gulf of California

- Location within Baja California Location within Mexico

Geography
- Location: Gulf of California
- Coordinates: 28°59′46.09″N 113°30′35.08″W
- Area: 1.3 km^{2} (0.50 sq mi)
- Highest elevation: 87 m (285 ft)

Administration
- Mexico
- State: Baja California

Demographics
- Population: uninhabited

Isla La Ventana, or the Window, is an island in the Gulf of California, located within Bahía de los Ángeles east of the Baja California Peninsula. The island is uninhabited and is part of the Ensenada Municipality.

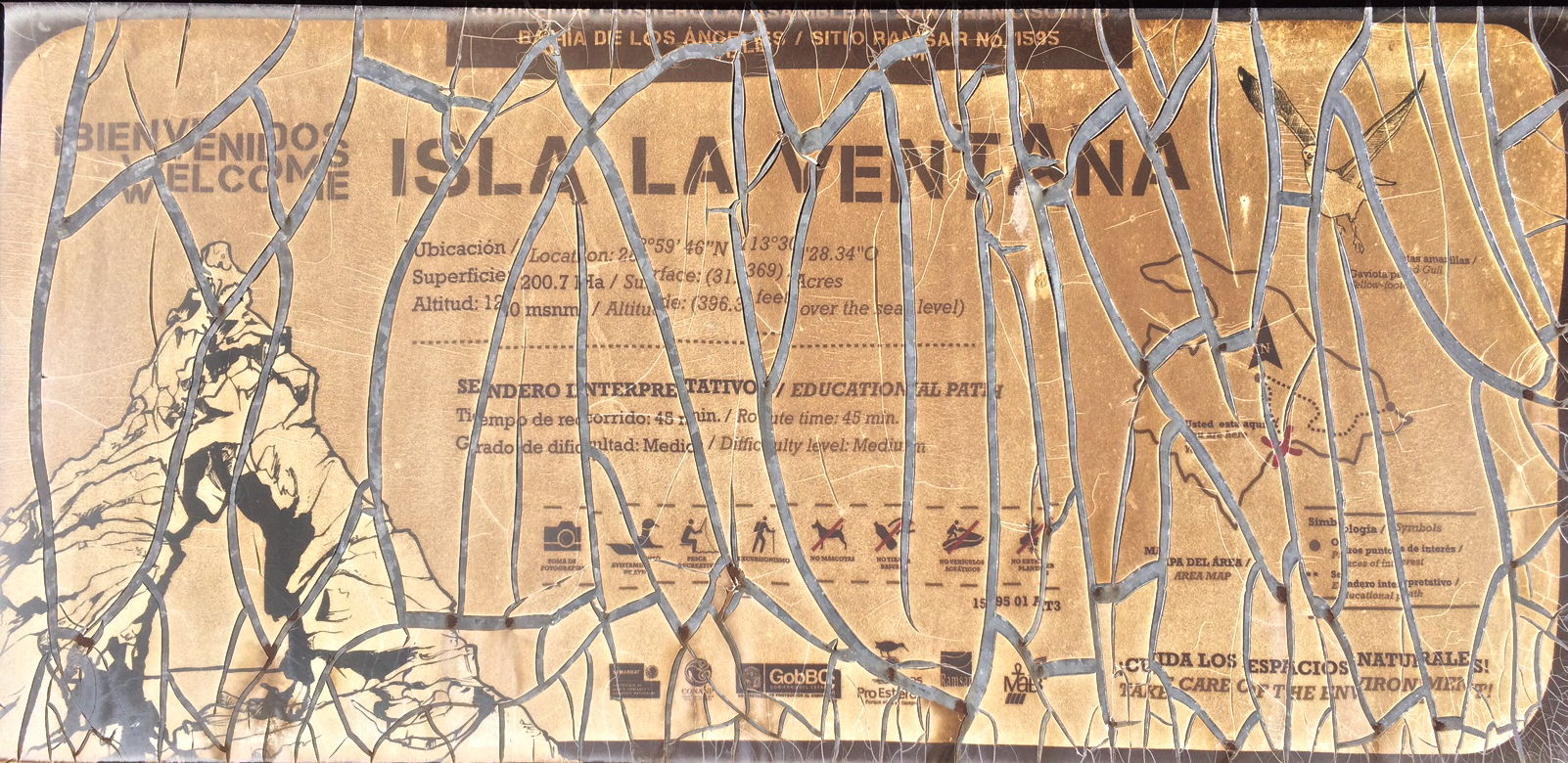

== Biology ==
Isla La Ventana has three species of reptile: Phyllodactylus nocticolus (Peninsular Leaf-toed Gecko), Sauromalus hispidus (Spiny Chuckwalla), and Uta stansburiana (Common Side-blotched Lizard).
