= Isla El Muerto =

Island in the Gulf of California

- Location within Baja California Location within Mexico

Geography
- Location: Gulf of California
- Coordinates: 30°05′21.61″N 114°32′27.97″W
- Highest elevation: 150 m (490 ft)

Administration
- Mexico
- State: Baja California

Demographics
- Population: uninhabited

Isla El Muerto is an island in the Gulf of California east of the Baja California Peninsula. The island is uninhabited and is part of San Felipe Municipality.

== Biology ==
Isla El Muerto has eight species of reptile, including two endemic species/subspecies, Crotalus muertensis (Isla El Muerto rattlesnake) and Uta lowei (dead side-blotched lizard). There are no amphibians.
