= Isla Piojo =

- Location within Mexico

Geography
- Location: Gulf of California
- Coordinates: 29°01′4.43″N 113°27′54.58″W
- Highest elevation: 65 m (213 ft)

Administration
- Mexico
- State: Baja California

Demographics
- Population: uninhabited

Isla Piojo, or Lice Island, is an island in the Gulf of California, located within Bahía de los Ángeles east of the Baja California Peninsula. The island is uninhabited and is part of the Ensenada Municipality.

== Biology ==
Isla Piojo has four species of reptiles: Crotalus mitchellii (speckled rattlesnake), Phyllodactylus nocticolus (peninsular leaf-toed gecko), Sauromalus hispidus (spiny chuckwalla), and Uta stansburiana (common side-blotched lizard).
