= Isla Ángel de la Guarda =

Island in Baja California, Mexico

Native name: Spanish: Isla Ángel de la Guarda; Seri: Xazl Iimt
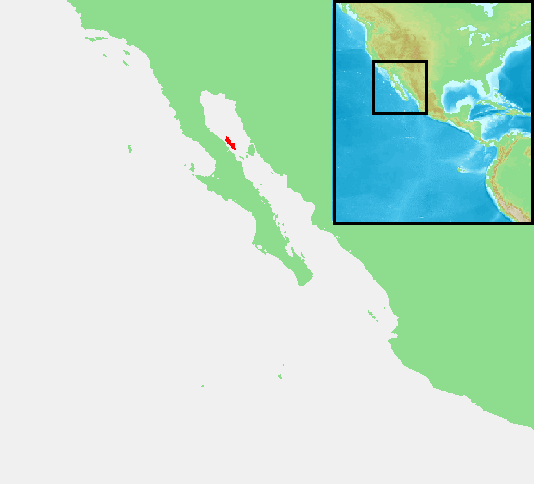
- Isla Ángel de la Guarda

- Location within Baja California Location within Sonora Location within Mexico

Geography
- Location: Gulf of California
- Coordinates: 29°15′36″N 113°22′13″W
- Total islands: 5
- Major islands: 1
- Area: 931 km^{2} (359 sq mi)
- Highest elevation: 1,305 m (4281 ft)
- Highest point: Unnamed peak

Administration
- Mexico
- State: Baja California

Demographics
- Population: 0

Isla Ángel de la Guarda, (Guardian Angel Island) also called Archangel Island, is a large uninhabited island in the Gulf of California (Sea of Cortez) east of Bahía de los Ángeles in northwestern Mexico, separated from the Baja California peninsula by the Canal de Ballenas (Whales Channel). It is the second largest of the eleven Midriff Islands or Islas Grandes. It is part of the state of Baja California, located northwest of Tiburón Island. It is a biological reserve called Isla Angel de la Guarda National Park. The island is part of the San Quintín municipality.

The geologically active Ballenas Fault runs along the seabed of the linear Canal de Ballenas. A 6.9 magnitude earthquake occurred on this fault in 2009.

== Geography ==
The island is extremely dry, with no sources of fresh water other than washes following rainfall. It has an area of 931 square kilometers (359 sq mi) and a chain of mountains runs along its 69 km (43 mi) length, reaching a maximum of 1,305 m (4,281 ft) above sea level. It runs northwest to southeast. The west coast is roughly straight in that direction, but the east coast runs inward near the middle before heading outward until it reaches the island's widest point. The coast then runs south for a while before finally returning to its southeasterly direction.

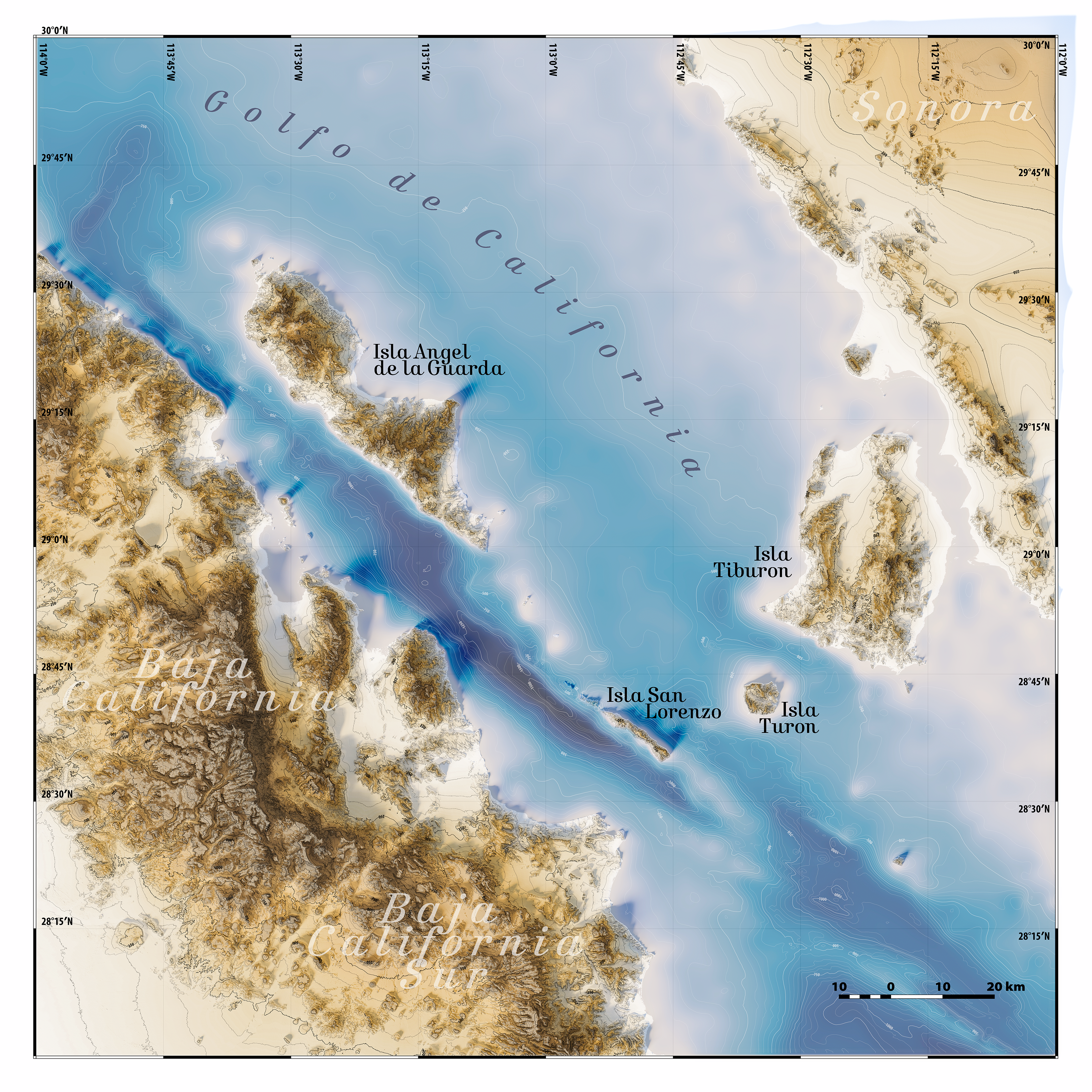
Topographic map of the area around Isla Ángel de la Guarda

Much of the island is inaccessible due to mountains at or near the shore, especially on the west coast. There are a few flat areas on the coast at the outlets of washes that were created by sediment. These alluvial fans are mostly on the east coast, but a large one is found on the west coast where the island narrows in the middle. Much of the island's geology is made up of volcanic and alluvial sand deposits.

== Biology ==
Despite its extreme dryness, the island is relatively diverse in plant and animal life. There are many types of birds and reptiles, especially lizards. The Angel Island chuckwalla, Angel Island speckled rattlesnake (Crotalus angelensis), Angel Island mouse (Peromyscus guardia) and Angel de la Guarda woodrat (Neotoma insularis) occur only on the island. The only mammals are bats, rodents, and introduced feral cats. Plants include elephant trees, cacti, grasses, shrubs, succulents, and boojum trees.

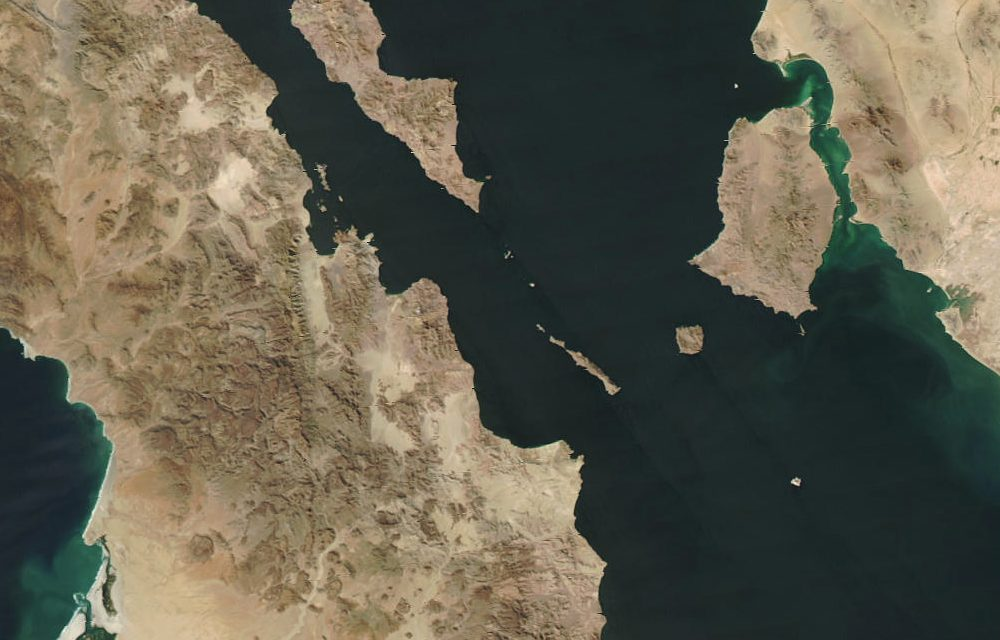
Middle and southern section of Isla Ángel de la Guarda.

== History ==
In May 1995, two Californian tourists named Mark Sorensen and Rob Rusnack survived being shipwrecked on the island. Their story was later featured on a 2005 episode of the television series I Shouldn't Be Alive. In October 2000, another group of Californian tourists got shipwrecked on the island. Two survived, while a third, Lorenzo Madrid, died on the island. The story of these three men was featured on a separate episode of I Shouldn't Be Alive.

== See also ==
- History of the west coast of North America
