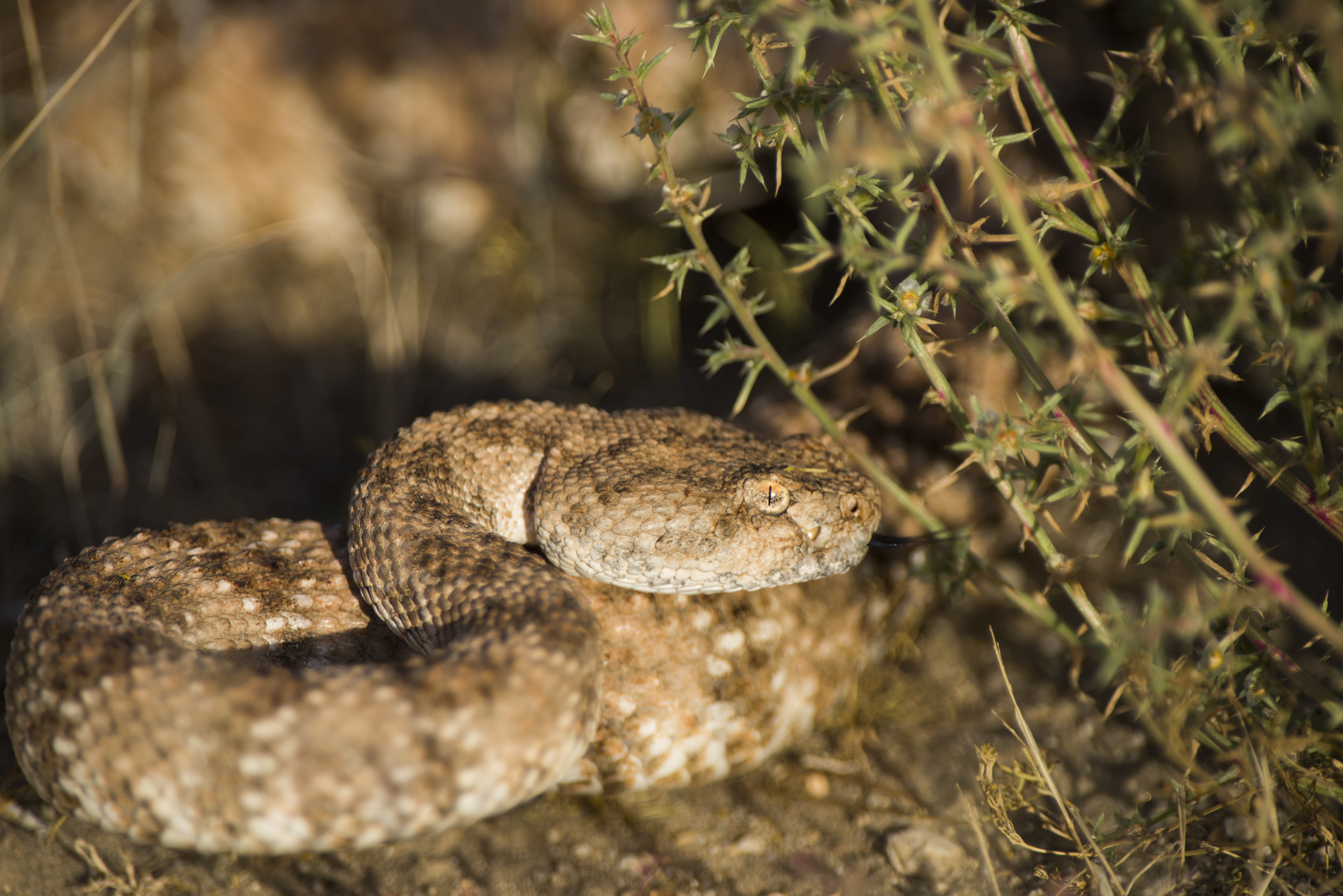

Conservation status
- Least Concern (IUCN 3.1)

Scientific classification
- Kingdom: Animalia
- Phylum: Chordata
- Class: Reptilia
- Order: Squamata
- Suborder: Serpentes
- Family: Viperidae
- Genus: Crotalus
- Species: C. mitchellii

Binomial name
- Crotalus mitchellii (Cope, 1861)
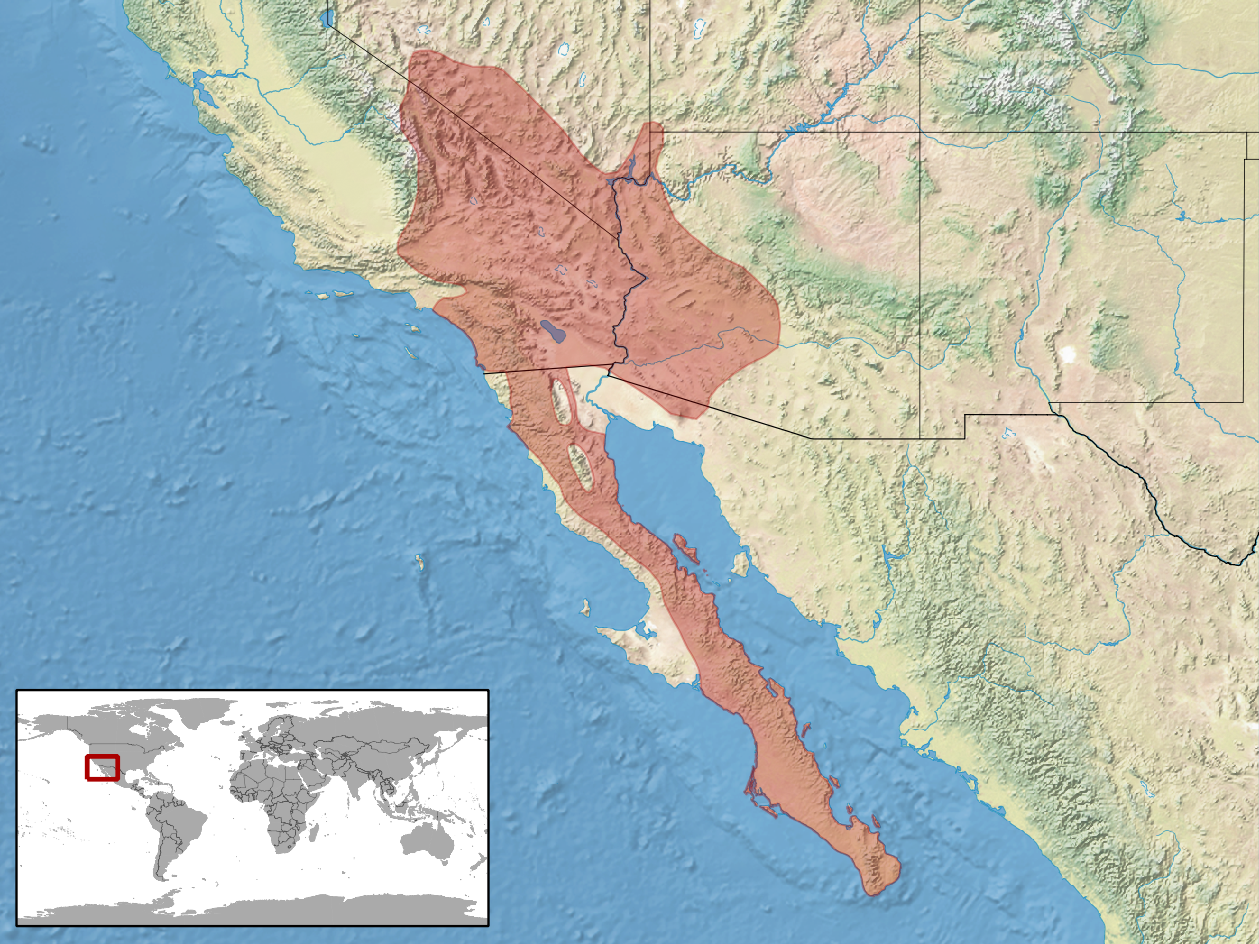

Synonyms
- Caudisona mitchellii Cope, 1861; C[rotalus]. mitchellii — Cope In Yarrow In Wheeler, 1875; [Crotalus oreganus] Var. mitchellii — Garman, 1884; Crotalus mitcheli [sic] Belding, 1887 (ex errore); Crotalus Mitchellii [mitchellii ] — Stejneger, 1895; Crotalus mitchelli — Boulenger, 1896; Crotalus aureus Kallert, 1927; Crotalus tigris mitchellii — Amaral, 1929; Crotalus confluentus mitchelli — Klauber, 1930; Crotalus mitchelli mitchelli — Klauber, 1952; Crotalus mitchellii mitchellii — McCrystal & McCoid, 1986

= Crotalus mitchellii =

Species of snake

Common names: speckled rattlesnake, Mitchell's rattlesnake, white rattlesnake

Crotalus mitchellii is a venomous pit viper species in the family Viperidae. The species is native to the Southwestern United States and adjacent northern Mexico. The species was named in honor of Silas Weir Mitchell (1829–1914), an American medical doctor who also studied rattlesnake venoms. Two subspecies are recognized as being valid, including the nominate subspecies described here.

== Description ==
Generally, Crotalus mitchellii does not exceed 100 cm (39 in) in total length (tail included), with large males measuring between 90 and 100 cm (35 and 39 in). The race on Isla Ángel de la Guarda is known to become larger, the maximum recorded length for a specimen there being 136.7 cm (53.8 in). In contrast, the population on El Muerto Island only reaches a maximum of 63.7 cm (25.1 in) in length. On the back are about thirty sometimes vague markings often in the form of crossbars. The speckled rattlesnake is sometimes erroneously called the tiger rattlesnake because of these markings. Other times the markings are clearly defined geometric shapes – diamonds, hexagons, hourglasses – which vary in color from snake to snake but are always darker than the ground color. Normally there is a community coloration based on the snakes' specific rock setting. The whole effect: an individual snake looks like it had been formed from granite, a protective coloration it uses with great effect, and that is also quite beautiful when examined, as one might a work of art, against a contrasting background.

== Geographic distribution ==
Crotalus mitchellii is found in the southwestern United States and in northwestern Mexico. In the US, its range includes east-central and southern California, southwestern Nevada, extreme southwestern Utah, and western Arizona. In Mexico, it is native in northwestern Sonora and most of Baja California, including Baja California Sur. It also inhabits a number of islands in the Gulf of California, including Angel de la Guarda Island, Carmen, Cerralvo, El Muerto, Espíritu Santo, Monserrate, Piojo, Salsipuedes, and San José, as well as on Santa Margarita Island off the Pacific coast of Baja California Sur.

The type locality is listed as "Cape St. Lucas, Lower California" (Cabo San Lucas, Baja California Sur, Mexico).

== Habitat ==
The preferred natural habitat of Crotalus mitchellii is rocky desert and shrubland.

== Behavior ==
Crotalus mitchellii is terrestrial, but will sometimes climb into low vegetation.

== Reproduction ==
Crotalus mitchellii is ovoviviparous.

== Subspecies and taxonomy ==
Subspecies	Taxon author	Common name	Geographic range
C. m. mitchellii	(Cope, 1861)	San Lucan speckled rattlesnake	Mexico, in Baja California Sur and on the islands of Santa Margarita, Cerralvo, Espíritu Santo, San José, Monserrate, and Carmen
C. m. muertensis	Klauber, 1949	El Muerto Island speckled rattlesnake	Mexico, on the island of Isla El Muerto

Grismer (1999) argued that C. m. angelensis and C. m. muertensis should be given species status, mainly due to differences in body size. More recently, Douglas et al. (2007) recognised C.m. stephensi as a full species, and Meik et al. (2015) elevated both the southwestern and the Angel de la Guarda speckled rattlesnakes to the state of full species, C. pyrrhus and C. angelensis, whereas the El Muerto Island speckled rattlesnake was considered part of C. pyrrhus

== Conservation status ==
The nominate subspecies (Crotalus mitchellii mitchellii) is classified as "Least Concern" on the IUCN Red List of Threatened Species. The population trend was stable when assessed in 2007. Species are listed as such due to their wide distribution, presumed large population, or because they are unlikely to be declining fast enough to qualify for listing in a more threatened category.
